= Administrative divisions of Hyderabad =

Hyderabad Corporation zones, circles and wards are divided by the Greater Hyderabad Municipal Corporation (GHMC) for its planning and development in Hyderabad, India. The city of Hyderabad is divided into six zones: Charminar, L. B. Nagar, Serilingampally, Kukatpally, Secunderabad and Khairatabad. Each zone is further divided into circles, thirty in total. The circles are subdivided into 150 wards, each with around 36,000 people in 2007; which later increased to 40,000 - 50,000 people in 2020. After the 2025 delimitation, the number of wards were increased to 300.

== History ==
On April 16, 2007 , the Municipal Corporation of Hyderabad was expanded into GHMC by merging 12 municipalities and eight grama panchayats surrounding the city. The number of wards then had gone up from 100 to 150. The number of zones increased to 6, number of circles expanded to 30.

=== 2007 List of wards ===
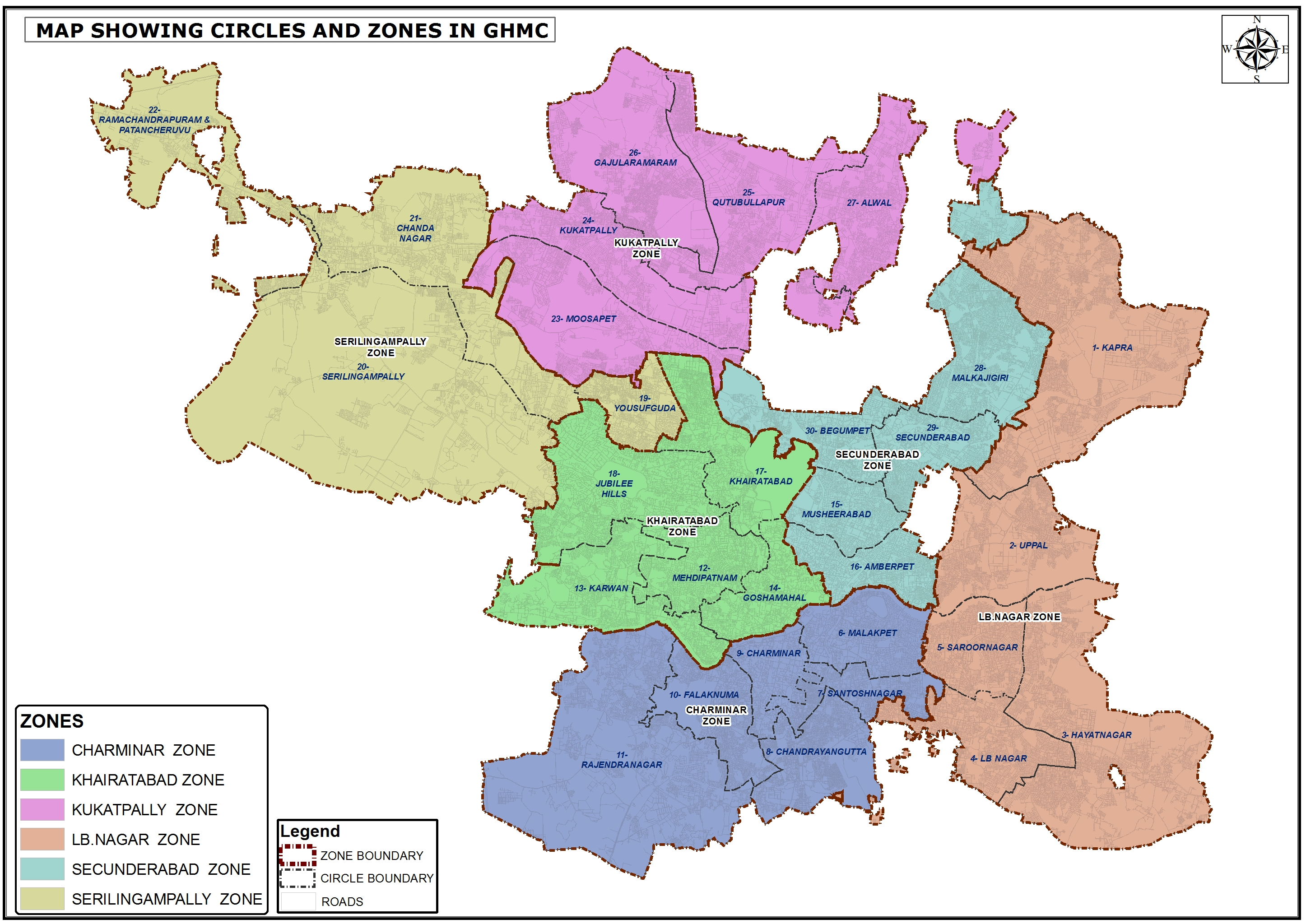
The old GHMC is divided into six municipal zones

The five old zones are divided into 30 circles

The 150 old wards of the Greater Hyderabad Municipal Corporation

Zone	Circle		Ward
Zone	#	Name	Ward
L. B. Nagar	1	Kapra	1. Kapra
L. B. Nagar	1	Kapra	2. Dr AS Rao Nagar
L. B. Nagar	1	Kapra	3. Cherlapally
L. B. Nagar	1	Kapra	4. Meerpet HB Colony
L. B. Nagar	1	Kapra	5. Mallapur
L. B. Nagar	1	Kapra	6. Nacharam
L. B. Nagar	2	Uppal	7. Chilukanagar
L. B. Nagar	2	Uppal	8. Habsiguda
L. B. Nagar	2	Uppal	9. Ramanthapur
L. B. Nagar	2	Uppal	10. Uppal
L. B. Nagar	3	Hayathnagar	11. Nagole
L. B. Nagar	3	Hayathnagar	12. Mansoorabad
L. B. Nagar	3	Hayathnagar	13. Hayaat nagar
L. B. Nagar	3	Hayathnagar	14. BN Reddy Nagar
L. B. Nagar	4	LB Nagar	15. Vanasthalipuram
L. B. Nagar	4	LB Nagar	16. Hastinapuram
L. B. Nagar	4	LB Nagar	17. Champapet
L. B. Nagar	4	LB Nagar	18. Lingojiguda
L. B. Nagar	5	Saroornagar	19. Saroornagar
L. B. Nagar	5	Saroornagar	20. Rama Krishna Puram
L. B. Nagar	5	Saroornagar	21. Kothapet
L. B. Nagar	5	Saroornagar	22. Chaitanyapuri
L. B. Nagar	5	Saroornagar	23. Gaddiannaram
L. B. Nagar	–	Dammaiguda	–
L. B. Nagar	–	Ghatkesar	–
L. B. Nagar	–	Meerpet–Jillelguda	–
L. B. Nagar	–	Pedda Amberpet	–
L. B. Nagar	–	Peerzadiguda	–
L. B. Nagar	–	Pocharam	–
L. B. Nagar	–	Tukkuguda	–
Charminar	6	Malakpet	24. Saidabad
Charminar	6	Malakpet	25. Moosrambagh
Charminar	6	Malakpet	26. Old Malakpet
Charminar	6	Malakpet	27. Akberbagh
Charminar	6	Malakpet	28. Azampura
Charminar	6	Malakpet	29. Chawani
Charminar	6	Malakpet	30. Dabeerpura
Charminar	7	Santoshnagar	31. Rein Bazar
Charminar	7	Santoshnagar	34. Talabchanchalam
Charminar	7	Santoshnagar	35. Gowlipura
Charminar	7	Santoshnagar	37. Kurmaguda
Charminar	7	Santoshnagar	38. IS SADAN
Charminar	7	Santoshnagar	39. Santosh Nagar
Charminar	8	Chandrayangutta	36. Lalithbagh
Charminar	8	Chandrayangutta	40. Riyasath Nagar
Charminar	8	Chandrayangutta	41. Kanchanbagh
Charminar	8	Chandrayangutta	42. Barkas
Charminar	8	Chandrayangutta	43. Chandrayangutta
Charminar	8	Chandrayangutta	44. Uppuguda
Charminar	8	Chandrayangutta	45. Jangammet
Charminar	9	Charminar	32. Pathergatti
Charminar	9	Charminar	33. Moghalpura
Charminar	9	Charminar	48. Shalibanda
Charminar	9	Charminar	49. Ghansi Bazar
Charminar	9	Charminar	52. Puranapul
Charminar	10	Falaknuma	46. Falaknuma
Charminar	10	Falaknuma	47. Nawab Saheb Kunta
Charminar	10	Falaknuma	53. Doodbowli
Charminar	10	Falaknuma	54. Jahanuma
Charminar	10	Falaknuma	55. Ramnaspura
Charminar	10	Falaknuma	56. Kishanbagh
Charminar	11	Rajendra Nagar	60. Rajendra Nagar
Charminar	11	Rajendra Nagar	61. Attapur
Charminar	11	Rajendra Nagar	57. Suleman Nagar
Charminar	11	Rajendra Nagar	58. Shastri puram
Charminar	11	Rajendra Nagar	59. Mylardevpally
Charminar	–	Adibatla	–
Charminar	–	Badangpet	–
Charminar	–	Jalpally	–
Charminar	–	Shamshabad	–
Charminar	–	Turkayamjal	–
Khairatabad	12	Mehdipatnam	70. Mehdipatnam
Khairatabad	12	Mehdipatnam	71. Gudimalkapur
Khairatabad	12	Mehdipatnam	72. Asif Nagar
Khairatabad	12	Mehdipatnam	73. Vijayanagar Colony
Khairatabad	12	Mehdipatnam	74. Ahmed Nagar
Khairatabad	12	Mehdipatnam	75. Red Hills
Khairatabad	12	Mehdipatnam	76. Mallepally
Khairatabad	13	Karwan	62. Ziaguda
Khairatabad	13	Karwan	65. Karwan
Khairatabad	13	Karwan	66. Langer House
Khairatabad	13	Karwan	67. Golconda
Khairatabad	13	Karwan	68. Tolichowki
Khairatabad	13	Karwan	69. Nanalnagar
Khairatabad	14	Goshamahal	50. Begum Bazar
Khairatabad	14	Goshamahal	51. Gosha Mahal
Khairatabad	14	Goshamahal	63. Manghalhat
Khairatabad	14	Goshamahal	64. Dattathreyanagar
Khairatabad	14	Goshamahal	77. Jambagh(Nampally)
Khairatabad	14	Goshamahal	78. Gunfoundry
Khairatabad	17	Khairatabad	91. Khairtabad
Khairatabad	17	Khairatabad	97. Somajiguda
Khairatabad	17	Khairatabad	98. Ameerpet
Khairatabad	17	Khairatabad	100. Sanathnagar
Khairatabad	18	Jubilee Hills	92. Venkateshwara Colony
Khairatabad	18	Jubilee Hills	93. Banjara Hills
Khairatabad	18	Jubilee Hills	94. Shaikpet
Khairatabad	18	Jubilee Hills	95. Jubilee Hills
Secunderabad	16	Amberpet	79. Himayathnagar
Secunderabad	16	Amberpet	80. Kachiguda Barkatpura
Secunderabad	16	Amberpet	81. Nallakunta
Secunderabad	16	Amberpet	82. Golnaka
Secunderabad	16	Amberpet	83. Amberpet
Secunderabad	16	Amberpet	84. Bagh Amberpet
Secunderabad	15	Musheerabad	85. Adikmet
Secunderabad	15	Musheerabad	86. Musheerabad
Secunderabad	15	Musheerabad	87. Ramnagar
Secunderabad	15	Musheerabad	88. Bholakpur
Secunderabad	15	Musheerabad	89. Gandhinagar
Secunderabad	15	Musheerabad	90. Kavadiguda
Secunderabad	28	Malkajgiri	136 - Neredmet
Secunderabad	28	Malkajgiri	137 - Vinayak Nagar
Secunderabad	28	Malkajgiri	138 - Moula-Ali
Secunderabad	28	Malkajgiri	139 - East Anandbagh
Secunderabad	28	Malkajgiri	140 - Malkajgiri
Secunderabad	28	Malkajgiri	141 - Gautham Nagar
Secunderabad	29	Secunderabad	142. Addagutta
Secunderabad	29	Secunderabad	143. Tarnaka
Secunderabad	29	Secunderabad	144. Mettuguda
Secunderabad	29	Secunderabad	145. Sitaphalmandi
Secunderabad	29	Secunderabad	146. Boudha Nagar
Secunderabad	30	Begumpet	147. Bansilalpet
Secunderabad	30	Begumpet	148 - Ramgopal Pet
Secunderabad	30	Begumpet	149 - Begumpet
Secunderabad	30	Begumpet	150 - Monda Market
Secunderabad	–	Boduppal	–
Secunderabad	–	Jawaharnagar	–
Secunderabad	–	Nagaram	–
Secunderabad	–	Thumkunta	–
Serilingampally	19	Yousufguda	96. Yousufguda
Serilingampally	19	Yousufguda	99. Vengalrao Nagar
Serilingampally	19	Yousufguda	101. Erragadda
Serilingampally	19	Yousufguda	102. Rahamath Nagar
Serilingampally	19	Yousufguda	103. Borabanda
Serilingampally	20	Serilingampally	104. Kondapur
Serilingampally	20	Serilingampally	105. Gachibowli
Serilingampally	20	Serilingampally	106. Serilingampally
Serilingampally	20	Serilingampally	111(P). Bharathinagar(P)
Serilingampally	21	Chandanagar	107. Madhapur
Serilingampally	21	Chandanagar	108. Miyapur
Serilingampally	21	Chandanagar	109. Hafeezpet
Serilingampally	21	Chandanagar	110. Chanda Nagar
Serilingampally	22	Ramachandrapuram / Patancheruvu	111(P). Bharathinagar(P)
Serilingampally	22	Ramachandrapuram / Patancheruvu	112. Ramachandrapuram
Serilingampally	22	Ramachandrapuram / Patancheruvu	113. Patancheruvu
Serilingampally	–	Ameenpur	–
Serilingampally	–	Bandlaguda Jagir	–
Serilingampally	–	Manikonda	–
Serilingampally	–	Narsingi	–
Serilingampally	–	Tellapur	–
Kukatpally	23	Moosapet	114. KPHB Colony
Kukatpally	23	Moosapet	115. Balaji Nagar
Kukatpally	23	Moosapet	116. Allapur
Kukatpally	23	Moosapet	117. Moosapet
Kukatpally	23	Moosapet	118. Fathe Nagar
Kukatpally	24	Kukatpally	119. Old Bowenpally
Kukatpally	24	Kukatpally	120. Balanagar
Kukatpally	24	Kukatpally	121. Kukatpally
Kukatpally	24	Kukatpally	122. Vivekananda Nagar Colony
Kukatpally	24	Kukatpally	123. Hydernagar
Kukatpally	24	Kukatpally	124. Allwyn Colony
Kukatpally	25	Quthbullapur	127. Rangareddy nagar
Kukatpally	25	Quthbullapur	130. Subhashnagar
Kukatpally	25	Quthbullapur	131. Qutbullapur
Kukatpally	25	Quthbullapur	132. Jeedimetla
Kukatpally	26	Gajula Ramaram	125. Gajula Ramaram
Kukatpally	26	Gajula Ramaram	126. Jagadgirigutta
Kukatpally	26	Gajula Ramaram	128. Chintal
Kukatpally	26	Gajula Ramaram	129. Suraram
Kukatpally	27	Alwal	133. Macha Bollaram
Kukatpally	27	Alwal	134. Alwal
Kukatpally	27	Alwal	135. Venkatapuram
Kukatpally	–	Bolarum	–
Kukatpally	–	Dundigal	–
Kukatpally	–	Gundlapochampally	–
Kukatpally	–	Kompally	–
Kukatpally	–	Medchal	–
Kukatpally	–	Nizampet	–

=== 2025 Delimitation ===
The number of wards in GHMC increased from 150 to 300 as part of restructuring notified in December 2025. The increase was result of merger of 27 surrounding urban local bodies, including 20 municipalities and seven corporations, into GHMC. In November 2025, it was announced that the 27 adjoining urban local bodies (7 municipal corporations: Badangpet, Bandlaguda Jagir, Meerpet–Jillelguda, Boduppal, Peerzadiguda, Jawaharnagar, Nizampet and 20 municipalities: Pedda Amberpet, Jalpally, Shamshabad, Turkayamjal, Manikonda, Narsingi, Adibatla, Tukkuguda, Medchal, Dammaiguda, Nagaram, Pocharam, Ghatkesar, Gundlapochampally, Thumkunta, Kompally, Dundigal, Bolarum, Tellapur, Ameenpur) will be merged into GHMC.

In the Old City, delimitation has resulted in 70 to 80 wards, while in the outer areas — where populations touch 70,000 — GHMC has created just one ward. With this proposed delimitation, GHMC's jurisdiction has expanded from 650 sq km to 2,053 sq km, making it the largest municipal corporation in the country in terms of both area and population. The ward boundaries had to be finalised by 31 December 2025, ahead of the 2026–27 Census — the first census since 2011. 2027 census of India requires "frozen" boundaries for accurate data collection, freezing changes to districts, towns, and villages before the 1 April 2026, start of the House Listing phase. On 25 December 2025, GHMC announced the finalization of delimitation of 300 wards. GHMC reorganization restructures Hyderabad into 12 zones and 60 circles.

For GHMC, reservations were notified for all 300 wards in January 2026. Of these, 5 divisions have been reserved for STs, 23 for SCs, 122 for BCs, 76 for General Women and 74 have been kept unreserved under the General category.

=== GHMC split (2026-present) ===
On 11 February 2026, The Greater Hyderabad Municipal Corporation (GHMC) was divided into three corporations: GHMC, MMC, and CMC. Following the end of the local body term on 9 February 2026, the Government of Telangana appointed special commissioners until the next local body elections are held. All the three corporations are governed by the Core Urban Region (Integrated Governance) Act, 2026. The reorganised GHMC covers approximately 689 km^{2}.

Old Corporation	Present Corporation	Area of Jurisdiction (in km^{2})	Zone	Wards	Total	Special Commissioners	Special Chief Secretary
GHMC	MMC - Malkajgiri Municipal Corporation	727	Uppal	24	74	T. Vinay Krishna Reddy	Jayesh Ranjan
GHMC	MMC - Malkajgiri Municipal Corporation	727	L. B. Nagar	24	74	T. Vinay Krishna Reddy	Jayesh Ranjan
GHMC	MMC - Malkajgiri Municipal Corporation	727	Malkajgiri	26	74	T. Vinay Krishna Reddy	Jayesh Ranjan
GHMC	CMC - Cyberabad Municipal Corporation	637	Kukatpally	23	76	G. Srijana	Jayesh Ranjan
GHMC	CMC - Cyberabad Municipal Corporation	637	Quthbullapur	27	76	G. Srijana	Jayesh Ranjan
GHMC	CMC - Cyberabad Municipal Corporation	637	Serilingampally	26	76	G. Srijana	Jayesh Ranjan
GHMC	GHMC - Greater Hyderabad Municipal Corporation	689	Secunderabad	28	150	R.V. Karnan	Jayesh Ranjan
GHMC	GHMC - Greater Hyderabad Municipal Corporation	689	Khairatabad	25	150	R.V. Karnan	Jayesh Ranjan
GHMC	GHMC - Greater Hyderabad Municipal Corporation	689	Golconda	26	150	R.V. Karnan	Jayesh Ranjan
GHMC	GHMC - Greater Hyderabad Municipal Corporation	689	Charminar	25	150	R.V. Karnan	Jayesh Ranjan
GHMC	GHMC - Greater Hyderabad Municipal Corporation	689	Rajendranagar	29	150	R.V. Karnan	Jayesh Ranjan
GHMC	GHMC - Greater Hyderabad Municipal Corporation	689	Shamshabad	17	150	R.V. Karnan	Jayesh Ranjan
Total		2053	—	300	300	—	—

== List of wards in CURE zone ==
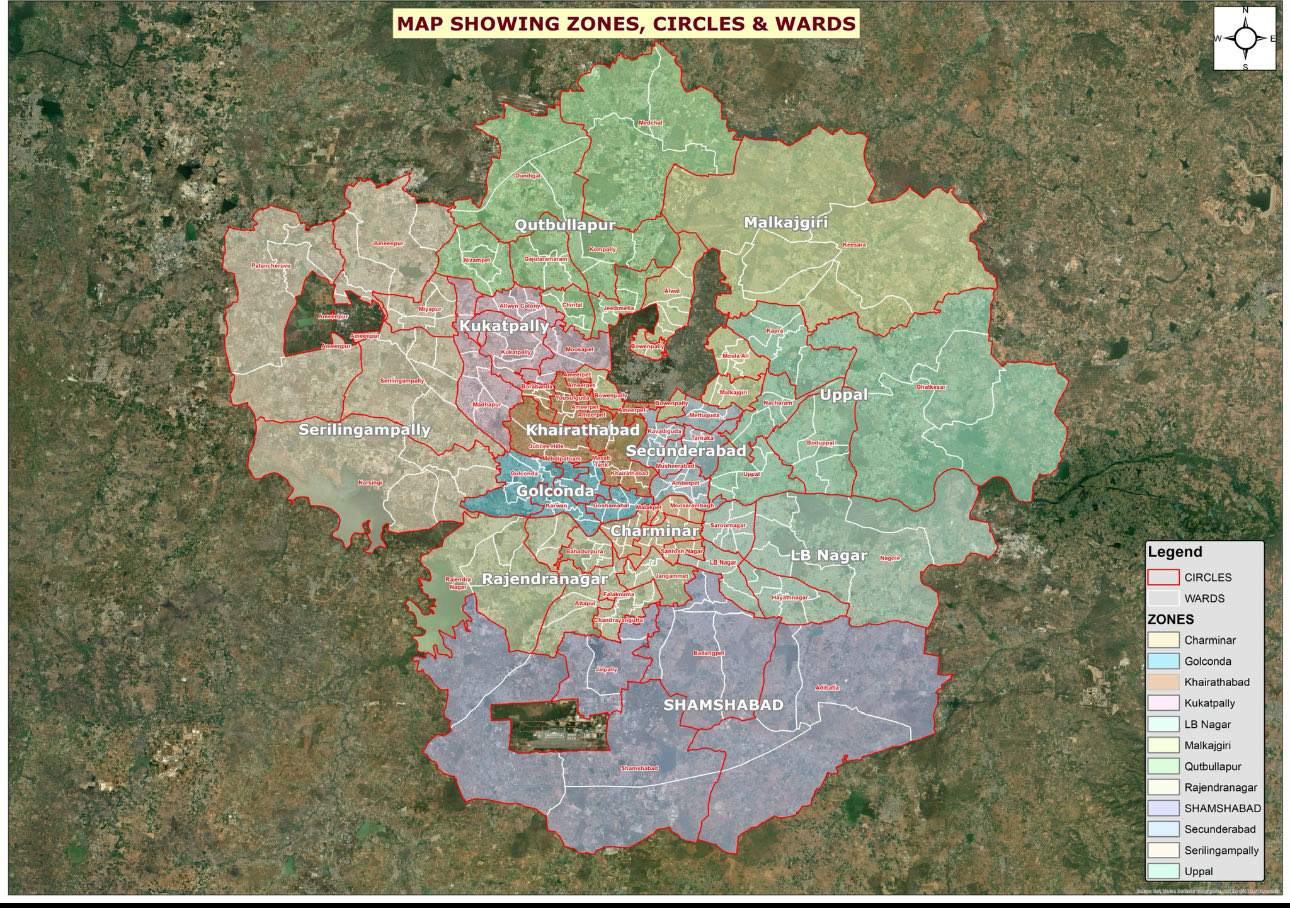
The CURE zone is divided into 12 municipal zones

There a total of 12 zones which are divided into 60 circles, which are further divided into 300 wards in Core Urban Region Economy (CURE) zone.

Zone	Circle		Ward	
Zone	#	Name	#	Name
Malkajgiri	1	Keesara	1	Keesara
Malkajgiri	1	Keesara	2	Chandrapuri Colony
Malkajgiri	1	Keesara	3	Jawaharnagar
Malkajgiri	1	Keesara	4	Dammaiguda
Malkajgiri	1	Keesara	189	Yapral
Malkajgiri	1	Keesara	300	Shamirpet
Malkajgiri	2	Alwal	190	Turakapally
Malkajgiri	2	Alwal	191	Macha Bollaram
Malkajgiri	2	Alwal	192	Alwal
Malkajgiri	2	Alwal	193	Venkatapuram
Malkajgiri	2	Alwal	194	Bhudevi Nagar
Malkajgiri	2	Alwal	195	Kanajiguda
Malkajgiri	3	Bowenpally	196	Monda Market
Malkajgiri	3	Bowenpally	260	Fateh Nagar
Malkajgiri	3	Bowenpally	261	Prakash Nagar
Malkajgiri	3	Bowenpally	262	Old Bowenpally
Malkajgiri	3	Bowenpally	264	Hasmathpet
Malkajgiri	4	Moula Ali	184	Balram Nagar
Malkajgiri	4	Moula Ali	185	Vinayak Nagar
Malkajgiri	4	Moula Ali	186	Moula Ali
Malkajgiri	4	Moula Ali	187	Kakatiya Nagar
Malkajgiri	4	Moula Ali	188	Neredmet
Malkajgiri	5	Malkajgiri	180	East Anandbagh
Malkajgiri	5	Malkajgiri	181	Mirjalguda
Malkajgiri	5	Malkajgiri	182	Gautham Nagar
Malkajgiri	5	Malkajgiri	183	Malkajgiri
Uppal	6	Ghatkesar	5	Nagaram
Uppal	6	Ghatkesar	6	Ghatkesar
Uppal	6	Ghatkesar	7	Edulabad
Uppal	6	Ghatkesar	8	Pocharam
Uppal	7	Kapra	13	Vampuguda
Uppal	7	Kapra	14	Kapra
Uppal	7	Kapra	15	A. S. Rao Nagar
Uppal	7	Kapra	16	Kushaiguda
Uppal	7	Kapra	17	Cherlapally
Uppal	8	Nacharam	18	Shakthi Sai Nagar
Uppal	8	Nacharam	19	H. B. Colony
Uppal	8	Nacharam	20	Mallapur
Uppal	8	Nacharam	21	Nacharam
Uppal	8	Nacharam	22	HMT Nagar
Uppal	9	Uppal	23	Chilkanagar
Uppal	9	Uppal	24	Beerappagadda
Uppal	9	Uppal	25	Habsiguda
Uppal	9	Uppal	26	Ramanthapur
Uppal	9	Uppal	27	Venkat Reddy Nagar
Uppal	9	Uppal	28	Uppal
Uppal	10	Boduppal	9	Medipally
Uppal	10	Boduppal	10	Peerzadiguda
Uppal	10	Boduppal	11	Boduppal
Uppal	10	Boduppal	12	Chengicherla
L. B. Nagar	11	Nagole	29	Nagole
L. B. Nagar	11	Nagole	45	Mansoorabad
L. B. Nagar	11	Nagole	46	Geological Survey of India
L. B. Nagar	11	Nagole	47	Lecturers Colony
L. B. Nagar	11	Nagole	51	Kuntloor
L. B. Nagar	11	Nagole	52	Pedda Amberpet
L. B. Nagar	12	Saroornagar	30	Kothapet
L. B. Nagar	12	Saroornagar	31	Chaitanyapuri
L. B. Nagar	12	Saroornagar	32	Gaddiannaram
L. B. Nagar	12	Saroornagar	33	Saroornagar
L. B. Nagar	12	Saroornagar	34	Doctors Colony
L. B. Nagar	12	Saroornagar	35	Rama Krishna Puram
L. B. Nagar	12	Saroornagar	36	NTR Nagar
L. B. Nagar	13	L. B. Nagar	37	Lingojiguda
L. B. Nagar	13	L. B. Nagar	38	Champapet
L. B. Nagar	13	L. B. Nagar	39	Karmanghat
L. B. Nagar	13	L. B. Nagar	40	Bairamalguda
L. B. Nagar	13	L. B. Nagar	41	Hastinapuram
L. B. Nagar	14	Hayathnagar	42	BN Reddy Nagar
L. B. Nagar	14	Hayathnagar	43	Vanasthalipuram
L. B. Nagar	14	Hayathnagar	44	Chintalakunta
L. B. Nagar	14	Hayathnagar	48	High Court Colony
L. B. Nagar	14	Hayathnagar	49	Sahebnagar
L. B. Nagar	14	Hayathnagar	50	Hayathnagar
Shamshabad	15	Adibatla	53	Thorrur
Shamshabad	15	Adibatla	54	Kongara Kalan
Shamshabad	15	Adibatla	55	Adibatla
Shamshabad	15	Adibatla	56	Turkayamjal
Shamshabad	16	Badangpet	57	Nadergul
Shamshabad	16	Badangpet	58	Prasanthi Hills
Shamshabad	16	Badangpet	59	Jillelguda
Shamshabad	16	Badangpet	60	Meerpet
Shamshabad	16	Badangpet	61	Badangpet
Shamshabad	16	Badangpet	62	Balapur
Shamshabad	17	Jalpally	63	Shaheen Nagar
Shamshabad	17	Jalpally	64	Pahari Sharif
Shamshabad	17	Jalpally	65	Jalpally
Shamshabad	18	Shamshabad	66	Tukkuguda
Shamshabad	18	Shamshabad	67	Mankhal
Shamshabad	18	Shamshabad	118	Shamshabad
Shamshabad	18	Shamshabad	119	Kothwalguda
Rajendranagar	19	Rajendranagar	120	Rajendranagar
Rajendranagar	19	Rajendranagar	121	Bandlaguda Jagir
Rajendranagar	19	Rajendranagar	122	Kismatpur
Rajendranagar	19	Rajendranagar	123	Hydershahkote
Rajendranagar	20	Attapur	112	Attapur
Rajendranagar	20	Attapur	113	Hyderguda
Rajendranagar	20	Attapur	114	Suleman Nagar
Rajendranagar	20	Attapur	115	Shastripuram
Rajendranagar	20	Attapur	116	Katedan
Rajendranagar	20	Attapur	117	Mailardevpally
Rajendranagar	21	Bahadurpura	103	Doodh Bowli
Rajendranagar	21	Bahadurpura	108	Teegal Kunta
Rajendranagar	21	Bahadurpura	109	Chandu Lal Baradari
Rajendranagar	21	Bahadurpura	110	Ramnasthpura
Rajendranagar	21	Bahadurpura	111	Kishanbagh
Rajendranagar	22	Falaknuma	104	Shah-Ali-Banda
Rajendranagar	22	Falaknuma	105	Falaknuma
Rajendranagar	22	Falaknuma	106	Jahanuma
Rajendranagar	22	Falaknuma	107	Nawab Saheb Kunta
Rajendranagar	23	Chandrayan Gutta	68	Bandlaguda
Rajendranagar	23	Chandrayan Gutta	69	Noori Nagar
Rajendranagar	23	Chandrayan Gutta	70	Barkas
Rajendranagar	23	Chandrayan Gutta	71	Kanchanbagh
Rajendranagar	23	Chandrayan Gutta	72	Chandrayan Gutta
Rajendranagar	24	Jangammet	73	Riyasat Nagar
Rajendranagar	24	Jangammet	74	Lalitha Bagh
Rajendranagar	24	Jangammet	75	Jangammet
Rajendranagar	24	Jangammet	76	Phool Bagh
Rajendranagar	24	Jangammet	77	Quadri Chaman
Charminar	25	Santoshnagar	84	Bhanu Nagar
Charminar	25	Santoshnagar	85	Santoshnagar
Charminar	25	Santoshnagar	86	IS SADAN
Charminar	25	Santoshnagar	87	Saraswathi Nagar
Charminar	26	Yakutpura	78	Gowlipura
Charminar	26	Yakutpura	79	Talab Chanchalam
Charminar	26	Yakutpura	80	Yakutpura
Charminar	26	Yakutpura	81	Dabirpura
Charminar	26	Yakutpura	82	Rein Bazar
Charminar	26	Yakutpura	83	Madannapet
Charminar	27	Malakpet	88	Saidabad
Charminar	27	Malakpet	89	Asmangadh
Charminar	27	Malakpet	93	Akberbagh
Charminar	27	Malakpet	94	Chawani
Charminar	28	Charminar	97	Purani Haveli
Charminar	28	Charminar	98	Pathargatti
Charminar	28	Charminar	99	Hari Bowli
Charminar	28	Charminar	100	Qazipura
Charminar	28	Charminar	101	Ghansi Bazar
Charminar	28	Charminar	102	Purana Pul
Charminar	29	Moosarambagh	90	Moosarambagh
Charminar	29	Moosarambagh	91	Old Malakpet
Charminar	29	Moosarambagh	92	MCH Colony
Charminar	29	Moosarambagh	95	Kala Dera
Charminar	29	Moosarambagh	96	Azampura
Golconda	30	Goshamahal	148	Dattatreya Nagar
Golconda	30	Goshamahal	149	Manghalhat
Golconda	30	Goshamahal	150	Goshamahal
Golconda	30	Goshamahal	151	Begum Bazaar
Golconda	30	Goshamahal	152	Jambagh
Golconda	30	Goshamahal	153	Exhibition Grounds
Golconda	31	Karwan	134	Langar Houz
Golconda	31	Karwan	135	Gudimalkapur
Golconda	31	Karwan	136	Karwan
Golconda	31	Karwan	137	Tappachabutra
Golconda	31	Karwan	138	Jiyaguda
Golconda	32	Golconda	129	Nizam Colony
Golconda	32	Golconda	130	Nanalnagar
Golconda	32	Golconda	131	Tolichowki
Golconda	32	Golconda	132	Golconda
Golconda	32	Golconda	133	Ibrahimbagh
Golconda	32	Golconda	223	Shaikpet
Golconda	32	Golconda	224	OU Colony
Golconda	33	Mehdipatnam	139	Asif Nagar
Golconda	33	Mehdipatnam	140	Padmanabha Nagar
Golconda	33	Mehdipatnam	141	Mehdipatnam
Golconda	33	Mehdipatnam	142	Syed Nagar
Golconda	34	Masab Tank	143	Vijayanagar Colony
Golconda	34	Masab Tank	144	Ahmed Nagar
Golconda	34	Masab Tank	145	Shanthi Nagar
Golconda	34	Masab Tank	147	Mallepally
Khairatabad	35	Khairatabad	146	Red Hills
Khairatabad	35	Khairatabad	154	Gunfoundry
Khairatabad	35	Khairatabad	217	Irrum Manzil
Khairatabad	35	Khairatabad	218	Somajiguda
Khairatabad	35	Khairatabad	219	Khairatabad
Khairatabad	35	Khairatabad	220	Himayatnagar
Khairatabad	36	Jubilee Hills	215	Jubilee Hills
Khairatabad	36	Jubilee Hills	216	Venkateswara Colony
Khairatabad	36	Jubilee Hills	221	Banjara Hills
Khairatabad	36	Jubilee Hills	222	Film Nagar
Khairatabad	37	Borabanda	210	Krishna Nagar
Khairatabad	37	Borabanda	211	Rahmath Nagar
Khairatabad	37	Borabanda	212	Karmika Nagar
Khairatabad	37	Borabanda	213	Rajeev Nagar
Khairatabad	37	Borabanda	214	Borabanda
Khairatabad	38	Yousufguda	205	Erragadda
Khairatabad	38	Yousufguda	206	Vengal Rao Nagar
Khairatabad	38	Yousufguda	207	Srinagar Colony
Khairatabad	38	Yousufguda	208	Yousufguda
Khairatabad	38	Yousufguda	209	AG Colony
Khairatabad	39	Ameerpet	200	Begumpet
Khairatabad	39	Ameerpet	201	Ameerpet
Khairatabad	39	Ameerpet	202	S. R. Nagar
Khairatabad	39	Ameerpet	203	BK Guda
Khairatabad	39	Ameerpet	204	Sanathnagar
Secunderabad	40	Kavadiguda	165	Gandhi Nagar
Secunderabad	40	Kavadiguda	166	Kavadiguda
Secunderabad	40	Kavadiguda	167	Bakaram
Secunderabad	40	Kavadiguda	168	Bholakpur
Secunderabad	40	Kavadiguda	197	Padmarao Nagar
Secunderabad	40	Kavadiguda	198	Bansilalpet
Secunderabad	40	Kavadiguda	199	Ramgopalpet
Secunderabad	41	Musheerabad	163	Adikmet
Secunderabad	41	Musheerabad	164	Bagh Lingampally
Secunderabad	41	Musheerabad	169	Musheerabad
Secunderabad	41	Musheerabad	170	Ramnagar
Secunderabad	41	Musheerabad	171	Bapuji Nagar
Secunderabad	42	Amberpet	155	Barkatpura
Secunderabad	42	Amberpet	156	Kachiguda
Secunderabad	42	Amberpet	157	Golnaka
Secunderabad	42	Amberpet	158	Patel Nagar
Secunderabad	42	Amberpet	159	Amberpet
Secunderabad	42	Amberpet	160	Bagh Amberpet
Secunderabad	42	Amberpet	161	Tilak Nagar
Secunderabad	42	Amberpet	162	Nallakunta
Secunderabad	43	Tarnaka	172	Boudha Nagar
Secunderabad	43	Tarnaka	173	Tarnaka
Secunderabad	43	Tarnaka	174	Sitaphalmandi
Secunderabad	43	Tarnaka	175	Chilkalguda
Secunderabad	44	Mettuguda	176	Mettuguda
Secunderabad	44	Mettuguda	177	Lalapet
Secunderabad	44	Mettuguda	178	North Lallaguda
Secunderabad	44	Mettuguda	179	Addagutta
Serilingampally	45	Narsingi	124	Narsingi
Serilingampally	45	Narsingi	125	Kokapet
Serilingampally	45	Narsingi	126	Gandipet
Serilingampally	45	Narsingi	127	Manikonda
Serilingampally	45	Narsingi	128	Neknampur
Serilingampally	46	Patancheruvu	263	Tellapur
Serilingampally	46	Patancheruvu	265	Muthangi
Serilingampally	46	Patancheruvu	266	Patancheruvu
Serilingampally	46	Patancheruvu	267	JP Colony
Serilingampally	47	Ameenpur	268	Ramachandrapuram
Serilingampally	47	Ameenpur	269	Bharathi Nagar
Serilingampally	47	Ameenpur	270	Beeramguda
Serilingampally	47	Ameenpur	271	Ameenpur
Serilingampally	47	Ameenpur	272	IDA Bollaram
Serilingampally	48	Miyapur	236	Hafeezpet
Serilingampally	48	Miyapur	237	Madeenaguda
Serilingampally	48	Miyapur	238	Chanda Nagar
Serilingampally	48	Miyapur	239	Deepthisri Nagar
Serilingampally	48	Miyapur	240	Miyapur
Serilingampally	48	Miyapur	241	Maktha Mahabubpet
Serilingampally	49	Serilingampally	225	Gachibowli
Serilingampally	49	Serilingampally	226	Nallagandla
Serilingampally	49	Serilingampally	227	Serilingampally
Serilingampally	49	Serilingampally	228	Masjid Banda
Serilingampally	49	Serilingampally	229	Sri Ram Nagar
Serilingampally	49	Serilingampally	234	Kondapur
Kukatpally	50	Madhapur	230	Anjaiah Nagar
Kukatpally	50	Madhapur	231	HITEC City
Kukatpally	50	Madhapur	232	Madhapur
Kukatpally	50	Madhapur	233	Izzat Nagar
Kukatpally	50	Madhapur	235	Matrusri Nagar
Kukatpally	50	Madhapur	242	Mayuri Nagar
Kukatpally	51	Allwyn Colony	243	Hyder Nagar
Kukatpally	51	Allwyn Colony	244	Bhagya Nagar Colony
Kukatpally	51	Allwyn Colony	245	Shamshiguda
Kukatpally	51	Allwyn Colony	246	Allwyn Colony
Kukatpally	51	Allwyn Colony	247	Vivekananda Nagar Colony
Kukatpally	51	Allwyn Colony	248	Venkateswara Nagar
Kukatpally	52	Kukatpally	249	Kukatpally
Kukatpally	52	Kukatpally	250	Balaji Nagar
Kukatpally	52	Kukatpally	251	Vasanth Nagar
Kukatpally	52	Kukatpally	252	KPHB Colony
Kukatpally	52	Kukatpally	253	Kaithalapur
Kukatpally	52	Kukatpally	254	Gayatri Nagar
Kukatpally	53	Moosapet	255	Allapur
Kukatpally	53	Moosapet	256	Moti Nagar
Kukatpally	53	Moosapet	257	Moosapet
Kukatpally	53	Moosapet	258	Prashanth Nagar
Kukatpally	53	Moosapet	259	Balanagar
Quthbullapur	54	Chintal	279	Rodamestri Nagar
Quthbullapur	54	Chintal	280	Jagathgiri Gutta
Quthbullapur	54	Chintal	281	Ranga Reddy Nagar
Quthbullapur	54	Chintal	282	Chintal
Quthbullapur	54	Chintal	283	Giri Nagar
Quthbullapur	55	Jeedimetla	284	Ganesh Nagar
Quthbullapur	55	Jeedimetla	285	Padma Nagar
Quthbullapur	55	Jeedimetla	286	Quthbullapur
Quthbullapur	55	Jeedimetla	287	Pet Basheerabad
Quthbullapur	56	Kompally	288	Kompally
Quthbullapur	56	Kompally	289	Dulapally
Quthbullapur	56	Kompally	290	Subhash Nagar
Quthbullapur	56	Kompally	292	Saibaba Nagar
Quthbullapur	57	Gajularamaram	277	Mahadevpuram
Quthbullapur	57	Gajularamaram	278	Gajularamaram
Quthbullapur	57	Gajularamaram	291	Shapur Nagar
Quthbullapur	57	Gajularamaram	293	Suraram
Quthbullapur	58	Nizampet	273	Nizampet
Quthbullapur	58	Nizampet	274	Bachupally
Quthbullapur	58	Nizampet	275	Bandari Layout
Quthbullapur	58	Nizampet	276	Pragathi Nagar
Quthbullapur	59	Dundigal	294	Bahadurpally
Quthbullapur	59	Dundigal	295	Bowrampet
Quthbullapur	59	Dundigal	296	Dundigal
Quthbullapur	60	Medchal	297	Medchal
Quthbullapur	60	Medchal	298	Pudur–Kistapur
Quthbullapur	60	Medchal	299	Gundlapochampally
