= Nadergul =

- city
- Location in Telangana, India Nadergul (Telangana) Nadergul (India)
- Coordinates: 17.293965°N 78.534874°E
- Country: India
- State: Telangana

Population (2011)
  - Total: 24,861

Languages
  - Official: Telugu
- Time zone: UTC+5:30 (IST)
- PIN: 501510
- Telephone code: 08415
- Vehicle registration: TS 07
- Sex ratio: 1:1(approx) ♂/♀

Nadergul is a part of Bandangpet Nagar Panchayath in Rangareddy district of Telangana state, India. It hosts Nadirgul Airfield.

The jurisdiction of Hyderabad Airport Development Authority (HADA) is about 458 km^{2} and covers 70 Revenue villages and 19 hamlets all falling in Ranga Reddy District, in this Nadergul village also included.

== Village population ==
- Total males:-12947
- Total females:-11914
- Total:-24861

Nadergul population
Village	Males	Females	Total	Notes
Nadergul	12947	11914	24861	Source : Population Census - 2001. Note : As Collected and Compiled by Director of Census Operations
Total	12947	11914	24861

=== Assembly Constituency ===
- Maheswaram and Kandukur Mandals, Saroornagar Mandal (Part), Medbowli, Almasguda, Badangpet, Chintalakunta, Jalpally, Mamidipally, Kurmalguda and Nadargul (Rural) Mandals. Hyderabad (OG) (Part). Balapur (OG) - Ward No.36, Kothapet (OG) - Ward No.37, Venkatapur (OG) - Ward No.39, Mallapur (OG) - Ward No.40, Lal Bahadur Nagar (M+OG) (Part), Lal Bahadur Nagar (M) - Ward No.11, Nadargul (OG) (Part) - Ward No.12, Jillelguda (OG) - Ward No.15, Meerpet (CT).

=== Colleges ===
1. MRR College of Pharmacy
2. MVSR Engineering College
3. Spoorthy Engineering College
4. Noble PG College of MBA
5. Noble College of Engineering Technology for Women (NETW)
6. Einstein Institute of Teacher Training, Nadergul
7. Einstein College of Education, Nadergul
8. Einstein PG College, Nadergul
9. bhavani decorators nadergul
10. vishwa bharathi College of Engineering&sciences {VBTS}

=== Transport ===
203 - Woman's college - Nadergul 203l/d - Dilsukhnagar - Nadergul 102B/203 - Nadergul -Secunderabad 203A - Women's college Koti - Nadergul
