= Chanda Nagar =

Chandanagar
- Neighbourhood
- Chanda Nagar, Greater Hyderabad, Telangana, India. Chanda Nagar చందా నగర్ (India)
- Coordinates: 17°29′48″N 78°21′41″E
- Country: India
- State: Telangana
- District: Ranga Reddy (RR), previously 'Hyderabad (Rural)'
- Revenue Division: Chevella
- Revenue Mandal: Serilingampally (Mandal Code #6)
- Lok Sabha Constituency: Chevella (Constituency #10) Member of Parliament = G. Ranjith Reddy
- Vidhan Sabha Constituency: Serilingampally (Constituency #52)

Government
  - Type: Municipal Corporation
  - Body: Greater Hyderabad Municipal Corporation (GHMC)
- Elevation: 536 m (1,759 ft)
- Time zone: UTC+5.30 (IST)
- Postal Index Number (PIN): 500050
- +Country Code-Area Code: +91-40

Chanda Nagar is a suburb of Hyderabad and is located close to Lingampally and Miyapur. It is administered as Ward No. 110 of Greater Hyderabad Municipal Corporation.

It has a mixture of commercial and residential properties with shopping malls and housing colonies. Power equipment manufacturer Bharat Heavy Electricals Limited (BHEL) is about 4 kilometres (2.5 mi) and the International Crops Research Institute for the Semi-Arid Tropics (ICRISAT)- is about (8 km) from Chandanagar.

It has undergone a drastic change in recent years especially due to its proximity to major IT companies like CA, Microsoft, Wipro, TCS, Infosys, Capgemini, Polaris, CMC, Honeywell, CTS and Infotech, and Hi-Tech city. Many IT professionals choose to stay at Chandanagar for the all-around facilities provided and the peaceful environment. Major educational institutes such as Indian School of Business (ISB), International Institute of Information Technology (IIIT), and Hyderabad Central University are within 10 km and it is also the nearest major suburb to the newly established Indian Institute of Technology (IIT).

The area has become a multi-community living area. In the recent GHMC elections, Mrs. Manjula Raghunath Reddy won the corporate seat.

== Commercial area ==
There are many shopping malls and supermarkets located in this area.

Large malls (Clothing) like Chennai Shopping Mall, RS Brothers, KLM Fashion Mall, and leading brand stores like Reebok, Adidas, BATA, Raymonds, Peter England, Pepe, Otto, etc., are part of this area. Among many supermarkets, Vijetha, Ratnadeep, and Heritage are the most famous. Big Bazaar is also planning an outlet just opposite Chennai Shopping Mall; the work is already underway. Furniture stores such as Anu Furniture, RNR's Furniture Square, Damro, and Visree Traders Furniture Store are present from the inception. Leading Electronic Stores like Bajaj Electronics, TATA Croma, YES Mart, and Reliance Digital are in this area. Healthcare places like - Apollo Clinic, Vishnu's Paramitha Children and Women Hospital, and American Laser Eye Hospital Pranam Hospital are also situated in this area.

Bigbazar is under renovation to Chandanagar.

Sridevi theatre, Srilatha Theatre, Asian Jyothi Theatre, Inox (GSM Mall), Miraj (Geeta Cinemas), and the upcoming JP Cinemas (Tapadia's Maruti Infinity Mall) are surrounded by Chandanagar with 19 screens. (adding JP Cinemas)

Chandanagar also has many educational institutions like Sri Chaitanya Jr. college, Narayana Jr. college, etc., and schools like Bhavans, and Sancta Maria in the vicinity. Mytri super specialty hospital and Tesla diagnostics are located here with many other clinics and general hospitals.

Gangaram Hanuman temple and Venkateshwara Swamy temple are the most prominent temples in the area. Hyderabad St. Thomas Marthoma Church is also located in Chandanagar.

== Public transport ==
The state-owned TGSRTC runs the city bus service, connecting Chandanagar to all the major centers of the city and IT Parks. Chandanagar is on the Hyderabad-Mumbai NH road which was widened to six lanes

It is serviced by Hyderabad's local train MMTS Train service.

The proposed road from My home Jewel on NH65 to Navayuga SEZ on Old Mumbai road as per the master plan may be laid as early as possible.

== Nearby Areas ==
Multiple major areas of Hyderabad and Secunderabad are in close range of Chandanagar.

Jubilee Hills - 12.1 km
Banjara Hills - 17.1 km
Gachibowli - 8.3 km
Madhapur - 9.2 km
Kukatpally Village - 7.0 km
Kukatpally Housing Board Colony(KPHB)- 4.9 km
Raidurg - 9.0 km
Narsingi - 15.0 km
Nallagandla - 7.7 km
Ameerpet - 12.9 km
Secunderabad - 18.1 km
Golconda - 16.6 km
Charminar Zone - 24.0 km
Punjagutta - 14.5 km
Manikonda Jagir - 13.9 km
Somajiguda - 15.2 km
A.S Rao Nagar - 24.1 km
Lingampally - 6.0 km
Miyapur - 3.7 km
Hafeezpet - 2.8 km
Madinaguda - 2.5 km
Patancheru - 11.6 km
Ramachandrapuram (BHEL Township) - 9.3 km
Ameenpur Village - 7.7 km
Beeramguda Village - 9.1 km
Rajendranagar - 24.8 km
Kokapet - 15.6 km
Dundigal - 21.7 km
Jeedimetla - 13.6 km
Alwal - 21.1 km
Old Alwal - 22.6 km
Amberpet - 23.6 km
Chaitanyapuri - 27.8 km
L.B. Nagar - 34.9 km
S.R.Nagar - 12.1 km
Himayathnagar - 19.2 km
Chanchalguda - 23.5 km
Shamshabad - 32.9 km
Chilakalaguda - 21.0 km

Distances are calculated using Google Maps as of Mar 5, 2023.
