= Suraram, Hyderabad =

Suraram
- Locality
- Location in Telangana, India Suraram (Telangana) Suraram (India)
- Coordinates: 17.541395°N 78.433766°E
- Country: India
- State: Telangana State
- District: Medchal-Malkajgiri district
- Quthubullapur Mandal: Hyderabad
- Talukas: Quthbullapur

Languages
  - Official: Telugu
- Time zone: UTC+5:30 (IST)
- PIN: 500 055
- Lok Sabha constituency: Malkajgiri
- Vidhan Sabha constituency: Quthbullapur
- Planning agency: HMDA
- Civic agency: GHMC

Suraram is a locality in Qutbullapur suburb of Hyderabad, India. It falls under Medchal-Malkajgiri district of Telangana. It is administered as Ward No. 130 of Greater Hyderabad Municipal Corporation.

== Transport ==
Suraram is well connected by TSRTC buses, they are

- /283c suraram To Secunderabad via suchitra & Dairyfarm
- 283 C suraram To Secunderabad via Balanagar, Bowenpally
- 283 D suraram To CBS via Balanagar & Punjagutta
- 283 I suraram To MGBS via Balanagar & Ameerpet
- 29B/283 N suraram to Secundrabad via Saibaba nagar Balanagar, Bowenpally
- 289 M to Mehdipatnam
- 283 v\s suraram To Secunderabad via Balanagar, Bowenpally
- 230 [All extensions goes up to dundigal] via suraram X road
- 272 [All extensions goes up to GandiMaisamma] via suraram X road
- 498 from Jinnaram to Sec-bad via suraram X road
- 511 from Narsapur to Balanagar
- Medak, Bhansuvada, Boddhan district services are also pass through this way
