= Champapet =

- Neighbourhood
- Location in Telangana, India Champapet (Telangana) Champapet (India)
- Coordinates: 17.348426°N 78.550959°E
- Country: India
- State: Telangana
- District: Ranga Reddy
- Metro: Hyderabad

Government
  - Body: GHMC

Population (2011)
  - Total: 33,516

Languages
  - Official: Telugu, Urdu
- Time zone: UTC+5:30 (IST)
- PIN: 500079
- Lok Sabha constituency: Malkajgiri
- Vidhan Sabha constituency: LB Nagar
- Planning agency: GHMC
- Civic agency: GHMC

Champapet is a residential and commercial suburb of Hyderabad, India. It is known for its many function halls. It is administered as Ward No. 17 of Greater Hyderabad Municipal Corporation.

== Transport ==
Champapet is connected by buses run by TSRTC. The following bus routes 104A,102C,104S,277 and many other buses heading towards Ibrahimpatnam will pass through champapet
