= Gagilapur =

Coordinates: 17°36′N 78°24′E

- neighbourhood
- Interactive map of Gagilapur
- Country: India
- State: Telangana
- District: Ranga Reddy
- Metro: Hyderabad

Government
  - Body: GHMC

Languages
  - Official: Telugu
- Time zone: UTC+5:30 (IST)
- Lok Sabha constituency: Secunderabad
- Vidhan Sabha constituency: Quthbullapur
- Planning agency: GHMC

Gagilapur is a village located in Ranga Reddy district. It falls under Quthbullapur mandal.

== Transport ==
The buses run by TSRTC connect it to different parts of the city.
