= Polkampally =

- Village
- Country: India
- State: Telangana
- District: Medchal-Malkajgiri

Languagesm
  - Official: Telugu
- Time zone: UTC+5:30 (IST)
- Pincode: 509382
- Telephone code: 08542
- Vehicle registration: TS06
- Website: telangana.gov.in

Polkampally is a village in Medchal-Malkajgiri district in the Indian state of Telangana. It falls under Moosapet mandal.
