= Obulakkapalli =

Village in Andhra Pradesh, India

Coordinates: 15°54′14″N 79°18′56″E

Obulakkapalli is a village in Peddaraveedu mandal, Prakasam district, Andhra Pradesh state, India. The village is named after its patron god Bodireddy.

Agriculture is the prime industry of the village. Citrus was once a major source of income for the village: farmers would export hundreds of trucks of citrus crops to Gaddiannaram Fruit Market every year, but due to the severe drought of 2002–04, most farmland became sterile from lack of ground water. Currently, the local water table exists at 500 – 600' depth. A large pond located nearby has also run dry, further hampering crop production.

The population of the village is around 600, divided 49% male / 51% female. The literacy rate is about 80%, and villagers are primarily Hindu.
