= Satharam =

Coordinates: 18°54′N 78°45′E

Satharam Sathavaram
- village
- Interactive map of Satharam
- Country: India
- State: Telamgana
- District: Karimnagar

Area
  - Total: 10 km^{2} (3.9 sq mi)

Languages
- Time zone: UTC+5:30 (IST)
- PIN: 505331
- Telephone code: 08725xxxxxxx
- Nearest city: Karim nagar
- Sex ratio: 1:2 ♂/♀
- Literacy: 90%
- Lok Sabha constituency: Nizamabad
- Vidhan Sabha constituency: Korutla

Satharam, also known as Sataram, is a small village located in Mallapur mandal of Karimnagar District of the Indian state of Telangana. Satharam has a population of about 3000 people.
