= Dulapally =

- neighbourhood
- Country: India
- State: Telangana
- District: medchal
- Metro: Hyderabad

Government
  - Body: CMC

Population (2025)
  - Total: 15,035

Languages
  - Official: Telugu
- Time zone: UTC+5:30 (IST)
- PIN: 500100
- Vehicle registration: TS
- Lok Sabha constituency: Malkajgiri
- Vidhan Sabha constituency: Quthbullapur
- Planning agency: CMC

Dulapally is a village located in Medchal-Malkajgiri district. It falls under Dundigal-Gandimaisamma mandal. Now doolapally merged with Kompally municipality under the Quthbullapur constituency

== Transport ==
The buses run by TGSRTC connect it to different parts of the city. 227 Bus from Secunderabad to Bahadurpally.
