= Jagathgirigutta =

- Neighbourhood
- Location in Telangana, India Jagathgirigutta (Telangana) Jagathgirigutta (India)
- Coordinates: 17.5020422°N 78.4260203°E
- Country: India
- State: Telangana
- District: Medchal-Malkajgiri
- City: Hyderabad

Government
  - Body: GHMC

Area
  - Total: 14.5 km^{2} (5.6 sq mi)
- Elevation: 540 m (1,770 ft)

Languages
  - Official: Telugu
- Time zone: UTC+5:30 (IST)
- PIN Code: 500 037
- Vehicle registration: TS-08
- Lok Sabha constituency: Malkajgiri
- Vidhan Sabha constituency: Qutbullapur
- Planning agency: HMDA

Jagathgirigutta is a residential neighbourhood in Hyderabad, Telangana, India. It falls under Qutbullapur mandal of Medchal-Malkajgiri district. It is administered as Ward No. 126 of Greater Hyderabad Municipal Corporation.

Jagathgirigutta literally means "Universal Hill" in Telugu and a famous Lord Venkateshwara Temple located on the hillock where an annual carnival is held.
