= Adikmet =

- neighbourhood
- Location in Telangana, India Adikmet (Telangana) Adikmet (India)
- Coordinates: 17.40698°N 78.51284°E
- Country: India
- State: Telangana
- District: Hyderabad
- Metro: Hyderabad

Government
  - Body: GHMC

Languages
  - Official: Telugu
- Time zone: UTC+5:30 (IST)
- PIN: 500 044
- Vehicle registration: TG
- Lok Sabha constituency: Secunderabad
- Vidhan Sabha constituency: Musheerabad
- Planning agency: GHMC
- Website: telangana.gov.in

Adikmet is an urban locality in Hyderabad, India. Mainly a residential area, it is very close to Osmania University's campus. The neighbourhood has a Hanuman temple and is located near the road from Nallakunta to Tarnaka.

== History ==
As per some historical accounts, Adikmet which means "Supreme Heights" was once a Jagir which the Second Nizam Mir Ahmed Ali Khan had granted to Mah Laqa Bai. The erstwhile Jagir of Adikmet totalling an area of about one thousand six hundred acres (6.5 km^{2}) today houses the Osmania University campus.

== Transport ==
TSRTC buses connects Adikmet with all parts of the city. The closest MMTS Train station is at Jamia Osmania.
