= Allwyn Colony =

- Neighbourhood
- Location in Telangana, India Allwyn Colony (Telangana) Allwyn Colony (India)
- Coordinates: 17°29′N 78°25′E
- Country: India
- State: Telangana
- District: Medchal
- Metro: Hyderabad

Government
  - Body: GHMC

Languages
  - Official: Telugu
- Time zone: UTC+5:30 (IST)
- PIN: 500 072
- Vehicle registration: TG
- Lok Sabha constituency: Chevella
- Vidhan Sabha constituency: Serilingampally
- Planning agency: GHMC
- Civic agency: GHMC
- Website: telangana.gov.in

Allwyn Colony is a residential colony in Hyderabad, Telangana, India. It is located on the northwest fringe of Hyderabad city and is near to Kukatpally. Allwyn Colony is divided into two phases called first and second phases. The colony was constructed in 1980s by Hyderabad Allwyn for its employees.

== History ==
Allwyn Colony is developed by the Allwyn Housing Development Society. The Colony was developed to solve the housing problems of the employees in Allwyn Company. So Independent houses have been constructed with different quarters like A-Type, B-Type, C-Type. A-Type has 120 yards of land while B-Type & C-Type quarters have 96 yards (the difference between B and C-Type being the number of rooms). All Quarters have been allotted based on the lottery system. After the Construction, the Society carved out 600 plots, in phase-1 which were allotted to the members in 1987 by draw of lots. The Society then developed the area by providing all basic amenities like Manjeera water, electricity, transportation, temples, commercial complex, Kalayana Mandapam in 2011. Now Allwyn Colony contains more than 1000 independent houses.

== Public Transportation ==
Allwyn colony is well connected to the rest of the city by state-owned bus service,(TSRTC). Following are some of the Bus numbers and the corresponding routes in service:

- 10A/S : goes to Secunderabad Railway Station (via Erragadda)
- 185S : goes to Koti, CBS (via Erragadda)
- 30A : goes to Secunderabad (via Jagatgiri Gutta, Balanagar)
- 19K/A : goes to Mehidipatnam (via Kukatpally, Ameerpet, Banjara Hills)
- 10K/J : starts at JagathgiriGutta goes to Secunderabad Railway Station (via Allwyn colony, Erragadda),

Shared autos are available on a regular basis from Kukatpally and KPHB bus stops to the colony.

== Education ==
Allwyn Colony has a good number of educational institutions such as Bhashyam School, Nagarjuna High School, SSD Grammar High School, Akshara Techno School, Tagore Public School, Vasara Vidyalaya, Jeevan Jyothi Public School, Montessori High School, Siddhartha High School

== Neighboring colonies ==
Vivekananda Nagar Colony, Venkatpapiah Nagar, Sai Nagar, Kamalaprasanna Nagar, Madhavaram Nagar, Tulasi Nagar, Bhagyanagar colony, Jagathgiri Gutta, Yallama Banda, Venkateshwara Nagar, KPHB.

== GHMC Wards ==
2015 GHMC General election Allwyn Colony Became New Corporation wards under Kukatpally Zone which comes under West Zone. Dodla Venkatesh Goud is a Present GHMC Corporator.
