= Macha Bollaram =

Macha Bolarum Machabollaram
- Locality
- Location in Telangana, India Macha Bolarum (Telangana) Macha Bolarum (India)
- Coordinates: 17°30′52″N 78°30′49″E
- Country: India
- State: Telangana
- District: Medchal-Malkajgiri district

Area
  - Total: 8.36 km^{2} (3.23 sq mi)

Population (2011)
  - Total: 19,385
  - Density: 2,320/km^{2} (6,010/sq mi)

Languages
  - Official: Telugu, Urdu
- Time zone: UTC+5:30 (IST)
- PIN: 500 010
- Parliament constituency: Malkajgiri (Lok Sabha constituency)
- Assembly constituency: Malkajgiri (Assembly constituency)

Macha Bolarum or Machabollarum or Macha Bollaram is a major locality in Alwal circle of Secunderabad zone of Hyderabad, India. It comes under Alwal Mandal of Medchal-Malkajgiri district. It is 5 km far from Kompally, 2 km from Alwal, 10 km from Secunderabad railway station, 11km from Begumpet airport and 42 km from Rajiv Gandhi International Airport. It is administered as Ward No. 133 of Greater Hyderabad Municipal Corporation.

== Transport ==
Macha Bolaram is 9 km away from Secunderabad Railway station and 12 km away from Begumpet Airport and almost 43 km from Rajiv Gandhi International Airport.

Public transport include, city buses operated by TSRTC and MMTS rail services from Bolaram Bazar railway station.
