= Kapra =

- Suburb, Mandal, GHMC Circle
- Location in Telangana, India Kapra (Telangana) Kapra (India)
- Coordinates: 17°29′18.6″N 78°34′05.5″E
- Country: India
- State: Telangana
- District: Medchal-Malkajgiri
- City: Hyderabad
- Elevation: 565 m (1,854 ft)

Population (2011)
  - Total: 32,108

Languages
  - Official: Telugu
- Time zone: UTC+5:30 (IST)
- Telephone code: 040
- Vehicle registration: TS-08

Kapra is a neighbourhood of Hyderabad city. It falls under Medchal-Malkajgiri district of the Indian state of Telangana and serves as the mandal headquarters of Kapra mandal in Keesara revenue division. It is administered as Circle No. 1 of Greater Hyderabad Municipal Corporation. There are six wards under this circle i.e., Kapra (1), Dr AS Rao Nagar (2), Cherlapally (3), Meerpet HB Colony (4), Mallapur (5) and Nacharam (6).

== Geography ==
Kapra is located at 17.49°N 78.57°E.

== Revenue villages ==
Kapra mandal has three Revenue villages which are:-

- Cherlapally
- Jawaharnagar
- Kapra
