= Boduppal =

- Village
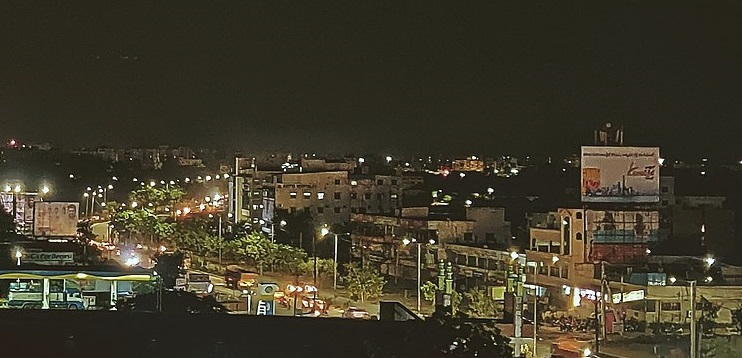
- Village of Boduppal by night

- Location in Telangana State, India Boduppal (Telangana) Boduppal (India)
- Coordinates: 17.4139°N 78.5783°E
- Country: India
- State: Telangana
- District: Medchal-Malkajgiri
- Mandal: Medipally, Telangana
- Metro: Hyderabad
- Established: 2016

Government
  - Type: Municipal Corporation
  - Body: Boduppal Municipal Corporation

Area
  - Total: 20.53 km^{2} (7.93 sq mi)

Population (Census 2011)
  - Total: 48,225
  - Estimate (2020): 135,000
  - Density: 2,349/km^{2} (6,084/sq mi)

Languages
  - Official: Telugu
- Time zone: UTC+5:30 (IST)
- PIN Code: 500092
- Telephone code: 040
- Vehicle registration: TS 08
- Lok Sabha constituency: Malkajgiri
- Vidhan Sabha constituency: Medchal
- Website: boduppalmunicipality.telangana.gov.in

Boduppal is a village near Hyderabad and a municipal corporation in Medchal–Malkajgiri District of Telangana, India. It is administered by Boduppal Municipal Corporation. Located at the eastern end of Hyderabad City, it is spread between Nacharam-Mallapur Road and Warangal Highway NH 163. Due to its proximity to Secunderabad and Eastern IT/SEZ of Pocharam, it is emerging as a major residential location in Hyderabad.

== Demographics ==
Telugu is the Local Language here. Total population of Boduppal (CT) is 43,692 according to census 2011. Among them Males are 22,255 and Females are 21,437 living in 2,666 Houses. Children's below 6 years are 5,163, Among them literate people are 32,038. All the numbers are according to 2011 census.

== Boduppal Municipal Corporation ==
Boduppal is a city in Medchal – Malkajgiri district of the Indian state of Telangana. The Boduppal Municipality (Merging of Boduppal and Chengicherla Gram panchayats of Rangareddy) was formed in the year 2016 and was upgraded to Municipal Corporation on 23.07.2019 vide G.O. Ms. No. 211. The city spreads over an area of 20.53 Sq Km. Boduppal has been developing at a high growth rate due to its locational advantage with developments happening in and around like Pochram IT Park, proposed Rail Terminal at Cherlapally. Spiritual place like Yadagirigutta (Telangana Tirupati) which is located at distance of 51 km. Boduppal city is located at the intersection of longitude of 17.6297°, 78.4814° at a distance of 14 Km from Hyderabad MGBS Terminal and adjoining to Uppal Circle of GHMC limits. It is located in North East direction to State Capital of Telangana and at a distance of 14 km, 25 km from the Ghatkesar mandal headquarter and District headquarter located at Keesara respectively.

== Transport ==
The Area is well connected by TSRTC to the rest of the City, having Bus Depo at Chengicherla and Uppal Depo at Boduppal Kaman. Nearest Railway station is Moula Ali, The other Railway station nearby is Cherlapally and Nearest Major Secunderabad Junction railway station. There is a proposal to upgrade Cherlapalli Railway Station, as a Major Terminus to decongest traffic in Secunderabad Railway Station. A Fly-over is under construction across Boduppal, to handle the heavy traffic.

== Government ==
Boduppal Municipal Corporation

Type
- Type: Municipal Corporation

Leadership
- Mayor: Samala Buchi Reddy
- Deputy mayor: Kotha Lakshmi Ravi Goud

Structure
- Seats: 28
- Political groups: TRS (14); INC (7); BJP (2)

Meeting place
- BMC Building

Boduppal Municipal Corporation administers the city of Boduppal. On 11 April 2016, the gram panchayats of Boduppal, Chengicherla were merged to form Boduppal Municipality. Boduppal Municipality is upgraded as Boduppal Municipal Corporation vide G.O.Ms.No.211, dt: 13.07.2019. Thotakura Ajay Yadav is Mayor. Kotha Sravanthi Kishore Goud is Deputy Mayor.
