= Gautham Nagar =

- Locality
- Location in the state of Telangana, India Gautham Nagar (Telangana) Gautham Nagar (India)
- Coordinates: 17°26′54″N 78°31′45″E
- Country: India
- State: Telangana
- District: Medchal–Malkajgiri
- City: Hyderabad

Government
  - Body: GHMC

Languages
  - Official: Telugu
- Time zone: UTC+5:30 (IST)
- PIN Code Postal Area and Head Office: 500056
- Vehicle registration: TS-08
- Lok Sabha constituency: Malkajgiri
- Vidhan Sabha constituency: Malkajgiri
- Planning agency: Hyderabad Metropolitan Development Authority

Gautham Nagar is a locality and a ward in Malkajgiri suburb of Hyderabad city. It falls under Malkajgiri mandal of Medchal-Malkajgiri district of Indian State of Telangana. It is administered as Ward No. 141 of Greater Hyderabad Municipal Corporation.

== Transportation ==
Gautham Nagar is well connected by TSRTC city bus services with Secunderabad. Nearest railway station is Malkajgiri railway station and nearest metro is Mettuguda metro station.
