= Yousufguda =

- Neighbourhood
- Location within Hyderabad Location within Telangana Location within India
- Coordinates: 17°26′07″N 78°25′38.5″E
- Country: India
- State: Telangana
- District: Hyderabad district

Government
  - Body: GHMC

Languages
  - Official: Telugu, Urdu
- Time zone: UTC+5:30 (IST)
- PIN: 500 045
- Vehicle registration: TG
- Lok Sabha constituency: Secunderabad
- Vidhan Sabha constituency: Jubilee Hills
- Planning agency: GHMC
- Website: telangana.gov.in

Yousufguda is a neighbourhood in Hyderabad, Telangana, India. It is a major residential suburb.

Due to its proximity to the IT hub near Madhapur, it has become a more affordable alternative to other areas in the vicinity such as Jubilee Hills, Gachibowli, and Sri Nagar Colony.

The Andhra Pradesh Special Police, First Battalion campus is located here.

== Commercial area ==
There are many shops which cater to all budgets. It has many shopping malls like Reliance Fresh, Ratnadeep, Heritage Fresh, ValueMart and More.

The neighbourhood has an eSeva Centre, a service provided for paying bills and other government services.

There are many banks which have their branches here such as State Bank of India, State Bank of Hyderabad, HDFC Bank, ICICI, Allahabad Bank, and Canara Bank.

== Transport ==
TSRTC connects Yousufguda to all parts of the city.

The closest MMTS Train station is at Begumpet, Borabanda or HITEC City.

== Sports ==
It also has indoor stadium named Kotla Vijay Bhaskar Reddy Indoor Stadium and Krishna Kanth Park. Yousufguda Lake (historically part of Krishna Kanth Park, also known as Sunnam Kunta or Yousufguda Cheruvu) is currently undergoing a massive structural overhaul under HYDRAA.
