= Hastinapuram =

Hasthinapuram
- Neighbourhood
- Location in Telangana, India Hasthinapuram (Telangana) Hasthinapuram (India)
- Coordinates: 17.326516°N 78.550243°E
- Country: India
- State: Telangana
- District: Ranga Reddy
- City: Hyderabad

Languages
  - Official: Telugu
- Time zone: UTC+5:30 (IST)
- Vehicle registration: TS

Hastinapuram is a neighbourhood of Hyderabad. It is located towards Nagarjuna Sagar highway road. Its neighbouring areas are B.N. Reddy Nagar, Vanasthali Puram and LB Nagar. Also NGO colony, Christian colony. The area is divided into four parts, East Hastinapuram, West Hastinapuram, South Hastinapuram and Central Hastinapuram. LB Nagar will be the nearest station of Hyderabad Metro Train. Tourism destinations like Ramoji Film City, and Mount Opera are located within 10–15 km. The distance to Hyderabad Airport is 25 km.
