= Matrusri Nagar, Miyapur, Hyderabad =

Matrusri Nagar M S Nagar
- Location in Telangana, India Matrusri Nagar (Telangana) Matrusri Nagar (India)
- Coordinates: 17.49°N 78.36°E
- Country: India
- State: Telangana
- District: Ranga Reddy
- Mandal: Serilingampally

Government
  - MLA: Arekapudi Gandhi, Indian National Congress

Population (2001)
  - Total: 146,139

Languages
  - Official: Telugu, Hindi
- Time zone: UTC+5:30 (IST)
- PIN: 500049
- Lok Sabha constituency: Chevella Lok Sabha constituency
- Vidhan Sabha constituency: Serilingampally Assembly constituency

Matrusri Nagar is a residential area near Miyapur cross Road. It is located 20.9 kilometres (12.9 mi) northwest of Hyderabad, is part of Greater Hyderabad and administered by GHMC and developed by HMDA. Transportation is managed by UMTA. Telugu is the local language.

== Transportation ==
Hafeezpet railway station and Chandanagar railway station are the nearby railway stations to Matrusri Nagar. Hyderabad Deccan railway station is the major railway station which is about 16 km near to Matrusri Nagar.

Hafeezpet Bus Station, Miyapur Bus Station, Miyapur cross Roads Bus Station, Kondapur Bus Station, and Deepthisree Bus Station are the nearby bus stations. Buses run to a number of places.

Miyapur Metro station is also located beside Matrusri nagar bus stand, providing even better and faster connectivity to various areas in the city.

== Administration ==
Matrusri Nagar is a part of Serilingampally Mandal. It was formerly part of Manchal Mandal. Matrusri Nagar is a part of Serilingampally (52) Assembly constituency. Matrusri Nagar is a part of Chevella Lok Sabha constituency.

== Society ==
Matrusri Nagar Residents Welfare Association takes care of this area.(MRWA) President Anil kavuri

== See also ==
- Telangana Legislative Assembly
- Ranga Reddy district
- Miyapur
- Hafeezpet
