= Shaikpet =

Shaikpet Shaikpet Mandal
- Mandal
- Hazrat Syed Hussain Shah Wali Dargah, Shaikpet

- Location in Telangana, India Shaikpet (Telangana) Shaikpet (India)
- Coordinates: 17.4034882°N 78.3989032°E
- Country: India
- State: Telangana
- District: Hyderabad
- Mandal: Shaikpet

Government
  - Body: GHMC

Languages
  - Official: Telugu, Urdu
- Time zone: UTC+5:30 (IST)
- PIN: 500008

Shaikpet is located near Tolichowki in Hyderabad, India. It is a mandal in Hyderabad District and one of the oldest suburbs of Hyderabad. There was a legislative assembly seat in its name; now after delimitation this area comes in Jubilee Hills seat. It is administered as Ward No. 94 of Greater Hyderabad Municipal Corporation. The councillor of Shaikpet Division is Mohammed Rashed Farazuddin.

== Revenue Villages of Shaikpet ==
Mandals and villages of Hyderabad District include

- Shaikpet
- Hakeempet
- Bakhtawarguda

== Prominent Residential Gated Communities at Shaikpet ==
Shaikpet is home to several prominent residential communities. Among them, Aparna One is the tallest high-rise building in Shaikpet and is also one of the tallest buildings in Hyderabad.

- Aditya Empress Towers
- Aditya Empress Park
- Aditya Empress Heights
- Aparna One
- Aparna Aura
- Sri Aditya Le Grandiose
- Sri Aditya Athena
- Western Plaza
- Harsha Sky High

== Prominent Commercial Establishments at Shaikpet ==
- D Mart
- RP Business Park
- Bajaj Electronics

== Prominent Educational Institutes at Shaikpet ==
- G Narayanamma Institute of Information technology
- International School
- Oasis School
- Aakash Institute
