= Kompally =

Residential suburb in Medchal-Malkajgiri, Telangana

- Suburb
- Location in Hyderabad, India Kompally (India)
- Coordinates: 17.499313°N 78.458261°E
- Country: India
- State: Telangana
- District: Medchal
- Metro: Hyderabad Metropolitan Region

Government
  - Type: Mayor-Council
  - Body: Komapally Municipality

Area
  - Total: 10.78 km^{2} (4.16 sq mi)

Population
  - Total: 15,575
  - Density: 1,445/km^{2} (3,742/sq mi)

Languages
  - Official: Telugu
- Time zone: UTC+5:30 (IST)
- PIN: 500100
- Vehicle registration: TG
- Lok Sabha constituency: Malkajgiri
- Vidhan Sabha constituency: Qutubullapur
- Planning agency: HMDA
- Civic agency: Komapally Municipality
- Website: https://kompallymunicipality.telangana.gov.in

Kompally is a residential suburb in the Medchal-Malkajgiri district. It comes under the Dundigal mandal in the same district. It is one of the fastest growing residential areas around Hyderabad, and has many large residential layouts filled with ample greenery.

== History ==
According to locals, Kompally was named after Kohanuddin, who was the Jagirdhar of the village during the Nizam’s rule. During the course of time, Kohanuddin became popularly known as "KhomPally".

Before the formation of the Greater Hyderabad Municipal Corporation, it was a small village on the outskirts of Hyderabad with grape gardens, farm houses, horticulture and was flooded with poultry farms. Chekuri Suryanarayana Raju and late Byrraju Satyanarayana Raju started the Grape Gardens in the 1960s. Satyanarayana was the father of Ramalinga Raju, the founder chairman of Satyam Group of Companies. The family and their related entities reportedly bought over 1,100 acres in four villages including Kompally as a part of the Satyam scandal.

Mooga Manasulu, a 1964 Telugu film with Akkineni Nageswara Rao and Savithri as protagonists, was shot in a haunted building adjacent to the Fox Sagar Lake here. The building has been replaced by the Shiva Shivani institute now.

Previously, National Highway 7 used to run by it, before it was merged with six other national highways to form the largest national highway in India, NH 44.

== Geography and Travel ==
Kompally is located adjacent to the National Highway 44 (NH 44), which is the longest national highway in India and connects Srinagar to Kanyakumari. Therefore, it is very well connected to Nizamabad, Kurnool, Bangalore and Kanyakumari in South India, as well as Delhi, Nagpur, Srinagar and other places up north.

Kompally is located 10 kilometers (km) from Paradise Junction in Secunderabad. The Secunderabad Junction railway station is 15 kilometer away by road. To travel to the Rajiv Gandhi International Airport, residents either take the Outer Ring Road (80 km taking about 1.25 hours), which is 3 km away at Kandakoya, or travel through the city (50 km in about 1.5 hours).

Kompally is currently not accessibly by city's metro system. This is a major disadvantage for locals.

== Places and Attractions ==
Places of interest include the cinema hall Asian Cineplanet Multiplex, Raichandani Mall, etc. The famous Basara Saraswathi temple is a four-and-a-half hour drive from here. ISKON Medchal is just half an hour away.

The Fox Sagar Lake is just a few minutes away in Jeedimetla.

Several schools and hospitals are located in Kompally.
