= Nagole =

- Residential neighbourhood
- Location in Telangana, India Nagole (Telangana) Nagole (India)
- Coordinates: 17.373576°N 78.568726°E
- Country: India
- State: Telangana
- District of Telangana: Medchal
- Metro: Hyderabad

Government
  - Body: GHMC

Languages
  - Official: Telugu
- Time zone: UTC+5:30 (IST)
- PIN: 500068
- Vehicle registration: TS
- Lok Sabha constituency: Malkajgiri, India
- Vidhan Sabha constituency: L B Nagar
- Planning agency: GHMC
- Website: telangana.gov.in
- The locality falls within the municipal jurisdiction of the Greater Hyderabad Municipal Corporation and under the Revenue Jurisdiction of the Medchal District. The names Medchal District and Hyderabad be used interchangeably for postal purposes.

Nagole is a residential and commercial locality in Uppal mandal mostly owned by Koduri family, Medchal district, Telangana, India.

== Locality ==
The locality is contiguous with the arterial Inner Ring Road of Hyderabad. The locality witnessed growth in the early nineties as a housing destination for the middle class. By the late 2000s, this locality's real estate grew further in value with the announcement of Hyderabad Metro in its proximity and growing infrastructure.

== Transport ==
Nagole is connected to several parts of the city through Telangana State Road Transport Corporation City Buses.

An elevated Metro Rail station for Nagole opened on 28 November 2017. The Metro Rail corridor terminates at Nagole and falls under the Blue Line Corridor of the transport system.
