= Jagathgiri Gutta =

- Colony
- Country: India
- Municipal Corporation: Greater Hyderabad
- State: Telangana
- Time zone: +5:30 Hours IST
- Postal code: 500037
- Area code: 040
- ISO 3166 code: +91

Jagathgiri Gutta is a Colony and a Municipal Division (Division 125) in Quthbullapur assembly Constituency in Hyderabad in Telangana state of India. The neighborhood has been marred by criminal activity in recent years, including illegal dumping of stolen rental bikes, a police investigation of food poisoning at a New Year's Eve party that killed one person and hospitalised 20 other people, and harassment of women in "dark spots".
