= Tukkuguda =

Thukkuguda
- Municipality
- Location in Hyderabad Telangana Location in India
- Coordinates: 17°12′33″N 78°28′35″E
- Country: India
- State: TELANGANA
- District: Ranga Reddy
- Mandal: Maheswaram
- Time zone: UTC+5:30 (IST)
- Country Code-Area Code: +91-40
- ISO 3166 code: IN-TG

Tukkuguda is a suburb located in the southern part of Hyderabad in Rangareddy district, Telangana, India. It falls under Maheswaram mandal.

It is 27 kilometers away from Koti, the Hyderabad city centre. The Outer Ring Road, Hyderabad has a major junction passing through this area. Rajiv Gandhi International Airport is 7 kilometers away. The Ayyappa temple is located in this area. Around 50000 to 100000 people live here as per 2023 census.
