= Nacharam =

- Neighbourhood
- Location in Telangana, India Nacharam (Telangana) Nacharam (India)
- Coordinates: 17.4307558°N 78.5595826°E
- Country: India
- State: Telangana
- District: Medchal–Malkajgiri

Languages
  - Official: Telugu
- Time zone: UTC+5:30 (IST)
- PIN: 500 076
- Vehicle registration: TG
- Lok Sabha constituency: Malkajgiri
- Vidhan Sabha constituency: Uppal

Nacharam is a neighbourhood of Hyderabad in the Indian state of Telangana. It falls under Uppal Mandal. It forms Ward No. 6 of Greater Hyderabad Municipal Corporation.

== Demographics of Nacharam ==
Telugu is the local language. Hindi and English are also spoken and understood by most people.

== Transportation ==
=== Rail ===
Moula Ali Railway Station and Malkajgiri Junction Railway Station are the nearby railway stations to Nacharam. Secunderabad Junction Railway station is at a distance of 8.5 km which connects to all major cities in India. Sithaphalmandi station is the closest station connecting to the MMTS service.

=== Local bus ===
Nacharam Bus Station, Nacharam Industrial Area Bus Station, Mallapur Noma and H.M.T Nagar Bus Station are the four bus stations that are served by TSRTC buses of series 3HN, 3N, 3KN,6HN, 250, 49M/250, 250C, 250S, and 17HN.

=== Metro ===
The closest Metro station is the Habsiguda Metro Station of the Corridor 3 of the Hyderabad Metro Rail which is 1 km away.

=== Auto-rickshaw ===
Several auto-rickshaws serve the area. Share-autos run from Habsiguda to Mallapur via Nacharam and Habsiguda to Chilka Nagar via Nacharam.

== Areas of Nacharam ==
Nacharam old village, Ram Reddy Nagar, Ambedkar nagar Bapuji Nagar, H.M.T Nagar, Baba Nagar, Annapurna Colony, Snehapuri Colony, Raghavendra Nagar, Karthikeya Nagar, Durga Nagar, New Raghavendra Nagar, Industrial Development Area, Sri Sai Nagar, Hema Nagar, and several other colonies.

== Economy ==
Nacharam is famous for its shoe factories and numerous shoe retailers along the Nacharam Main Road. TSIIC Nacharam Industrial Development Area houses numerous small scale industries working on fabrication, clothing exports, tyres, rubber material, and furniture.

After the advent of the IT industry in the city, and from 2000 the area has undergone some commercial development along the Main road which otherwise had mostly the footwear outlets. More recently, SPAR has opened its outlet in Paradise Mall near H.M.T Nagar. Reliance Digital, Heritage Fresh, Bajaj Electronics, Vijaya Sales, Value Zone Hyper Market is opened recently while others have all opened their showrooms in the last decade. Preowned Car Sales, Domino's Pizza corner, well known eateries and Restaurants are located on main road.

Nacharam being area with industrial buzz has several banks having branches to facilitate operation. S.B.I (3 branches), Andhra Bank, H.D.F.C Bank, Laxmi Vilas Bank, Syndicate Bank, Axis Bank, Bank of India, Oriental Bank of Commerce, Indian Overseas Bank, D.C.B Bank, Bank of Baroda, Indian Bank, Cosmos Bank, Canara Bank, Vijaya Bank. Other banks like I.D.B.I bank, Punjab National Bank, Corporation Bank, Telangana State Co-operative Bank, Central Bank of India have branches within 2 km from Nacharam.

== Religious places ==
Religious places include H.M.T Nagar Sri Venkateshwara Swamy temple, Sri Anjaneya Swamy Temple, Goddess Kali Temple, Mahakali Temple, Sai Baba Temple, St Pius X Church, and several other temples. The oldest mosques include Jamia Masjid, Masjid E Noor, Masjid-e-Bilal, and Masjid E Muneerunnisa and several more mosques. The temples serve many religious faiths such as Islam and Catholicism.

== Entertainment ==
Vyjayanthi Cinema has served the area for the past decade. SPI Cinemas S2 Cinemas have recently opened their presence in Hyderabad by opening Noma Talkies with four screens in Mallapur, a sub-locality in Nacharam. UK Cineplex which is beside Vyjayanthi Cinema is operating with 3 large screens in Nacharam is opened recently.

== Hospitals ==
Chandamama Multispeciality Hospital, Bapuji Hospital, Shree Pooja Hospital Prasads Hospital, E.S.I.C Hospital, Laxmi Nursing Home, Prasad Hospital and several other small hospitals serve the area. Several medical shops are present in the area with many serving 24x7.

== Schools and colleges ==
St. Mathews High School, Prathibha High School, Johnson Grammar School (CBSE, ICSE, SSC), Delhi Public School, St. Peters Model High School. Suprabhat High School, Kamala Memorial School, S.R. Digi School, Noble School are some major schools. St. Piou's Degree College for women and Many other smaller schools are present throughout the area.

=== Polling stations/booths near Nacharam ===
- Pratibha High School Nacharam
- M P C P S New Building Boys Uppal Kalan
- Kalyanpuri Community Hall
- St. Theresa High School Arul Nagar Kapra
- St.angels High School Babanagar Nacharam
- Kamala Memorial High School Nacharam
- St.Peters High School Nacharam
- Kamala Memorial High School Nacharam
- Kartikeya Nagar Reading Room
- Indira School, KartikeyaNagar, Nacharam
