= Jawaharnagar, Telangana =

Jawaharnagar
- City
- Interactive map of Jawaharnagar
- Country: India
- State: Telangana
- District: Medchal-Malkajgiri district
- Metro: Hyderabad

Government
  - Type: Municipal Corporation
  - Body: Jawahar Nagar Municipal Corporation

Area
  - Total: 24.18 km^{2} (9.34 sq mi)

Population
  - Total: 48,216
  - Density: 1,994/km^{2} (5,165/sq mi)

Languages
  - Telugu Official: Telugu
- Time zone: UTC+5:30 (IST)
- PIN: 500087
- Vehicle registration: TS 08
- Website: jawaharnagarcorporation.telangana.gov.in

Jawaharnagar is a city of, and a municipal corporation located in, Medchal-Malkajgiri district in the Indian state of Telangana. It was upgraded to Municipal corporation in 2019. Previously, it was a part of Shamirpet mandal but now falls under the newly formed Kapra mandal.

== GHMC dumpsite ==
The Greater Hyderabad Municipal Corporation (GHMC) dumpsite is located in this village over an area of approximately 350 acres and about 3,500 metric tons of waste generated in the city of Hyderabad daily is disposed off here. New facilities for resource recovery from waste such as compost, recyclables, RDF (Refuse Derived Fuel) are being created under PPP (Public Private Partnership) through reclamation and remediation of dumpsite area.

== Locality ==
It covers an area of 15,000 acres and is home to premier educational institutions like BITS Pilani Hyderabad Campus, Bio-Tech Park, Meditech Valley are all located here. XLRI is setting up its campus here on a 75-acre plot. Jawahar nagar starts from ″Ambedkar Nagar″ ends at "Balaji Nagar".
