= Mankhal =

- Country: India
- State: Telangana
- District: Ranga Reddy
- Metro: Rangareddy district

Government
  - Body: Mandal Office

Languages
  - Official: Telugu
- Time zone: UTC+5:30 (IST)
- Planning agency: Panchayat
- Civic agency: Mandal Office

Mankhal is a revenue village and panchayat in Ranga Reddy district, TS, India. It falls under Maheswaram mandal.

Rajiv Gandhi International Airport is 8 kilometres away from this village.

Name of the village is taken from the goddess name Mahankali. Mahankali temple is famous here which is there for centuries and it has been reconstructed recently.
