= Pedda Amberpet =

- Town
- Interactive map of Pedda Amberpet
- Country: India
- State: telangana
- District: Ranga Reddy
- Metro: Rangareddy district
- Established: 2013

Government
  - Type: Govt of telangana
  - Body: Municipal Administration & Urban Development Department

Area
  - Total: 57.32 km^{2} (22.13 sq mi)

Population (Census 2011)
  - Total: 27,813
  - Density: 485.2/km^{2} (1,257/sq mi)

Languages
  - Official: Telugu
- Time zone: UTC+5:30 (IST)
- Postal code: 501505
- Lok Sabha constituency: Bhongir
- Vidhan Sabha constituency: Ibrahimpatnam
- Planning agency: HMDA (erstwhile HUDA)
- Civic agency: Mandal Office
- Website: https://peddaamberpetmunicipality.telangana.gov.in/

Pedda Amberpet is a Municipality in Rangareddy district, Telangana, India. It comes under Abdullapurmet mandal.

== Location ==
According to the TRS party GO in 2018, Pedda Amberpet Nagar Panchayath was upgraded to Municipality. Prior to this, Pedda Amberpet Nagar Panchayath was constituted on 22 March 2013 by merging Pedda Amberpet Gram Panchayat and three other surrounding gram panchayats: Kuntloor, Pasumamula and Tatti Annaram in Ranga Reddy District. The Nagar Panchayat is near the GHMC and very near to Greater Hyderabad city i.e. about 10 km distance to the East. NH.65 pass through the Nagar Panchayat headquarters and the entire area of the Nagar Panchayat lies inside the Outer Ring Road.

It is 10 kilometers away from Hyderabad city. The Outer Ring Road, Hyderabad has a major junction at the village. Rajiv Gandhi International Airport is 34 kilometers away.

Pedda Amberpet lies close to densely populated middle class areas like Vanasthali Puram and Hayathnagar, and is along NH9. The national highway, along with the newly formed ORR junction (the biggest of all ORR junctions) provides excellent connectivity for Pedda Amberpet to all parts of Hyderabad. It is also around 8 km from the proposed metro station at Nagole.

The closest attractions to Pedda Amberpet are Ramoji film city (5 km) and Sanghi village and Temple (10 km). These two places attract a high number of tourists throughout the year.

== Schools ==
- Discoveri Oaks international School (IGCSE & CBSE)
- Challuri TharaDevi Memorial ZPHS (SSC Telugu and English Medium)
- Rama Devi Public School is located here.(ICSC Standards)
- Candor Shrine i School (CBSE)
- Rajasree Vidya Mandir (SSC)
- Douglas Memorial High School (SSC)
- Vyas Model School (nursery to SSC, play School, English Medium)
- On kuntloor - pedda Amberpet Road
- Satyam school (SSC)

== Transport ==
The state owned TSRTC connects to Hyderabad and surrounding villages.
