= Nawab Saheb Kunta =

District of Hyderabad, India

Nawab Saheb Kunta is a neighbourhood of Hyderabad, India. The neighbourhood is located in a low-lying area of the Old City and has been developed since 1978, fully developed locality with all shops, schools, and hospitals. The area is prone to waterlogging and flooding, which sometimes leads to problems with the supply of drinking water. As it is a majority Muslim population the municipality does not do much as compared to Raghuvendra colony which is nearby

Nawab Saheb Kunta is a municipal corporation in Hyderabad district, as it is one of the oldest neighbourhoods of Hyderabad. Most of the people live here are Muslims. It has its own GHMC corporator, Shireen Fatima.

The medical system of Nawab Saheb Kunta is poor. Regularly, people who live there are diagnosed with different diseases which are rare in more well-to-do areas, like dengue, malaria, and chikungunya.

Unrepaired and Tarmacless roads and scarcity of water continues to affect vast areas of the Old City. The residents of Vettapally, Fatima Nagar, Nawab Sahab kunta, Tigal kunta and Mustafa Nagar of Bhadurpura constituency, alleged that local administration has ignored these areas which lack basic amenities.

The All India Majlis-e-Ittehadul Muslimeen party is strong in this area.

The oldest mosques in this area are Masjid-e-Omer Farooq, Masjid-e-Bilal, and Masjid-e-Bibi Fatima.
