= Lalapet =

- neighbourhood
- Location in Hyderabad, India Lalapet (India)
- Coordinates: 17.4397°N 78.542377°E
- Country: India
- State: Telangana
- District: Hyderabad District
- Metro: Hyderabad Metropolitan Region

Government
  - Body: GHMC

Languages
  - Official: Telugu, Urdu
- Time zone: UTC+5:30 (IST)
- PIN: 500017
- Vehicle registration: TG
- Lok Sabha constituency: Secunderabad
- Vidhan Sabha constituency: Secunderabad
- Planning agency: GHMC
- Website: telangana.gov.in

Lalapet is a very old suburb located in Hyderabad. The suburb is located at about 5.5 kilometres (3.4 mi) from Secunderabad. Earlier when Lalapet was still a village, the entire locality was enclosed in a protective wall. The wall was built during the regime of Qutb Shahi. It is also claimed by locals that Asaf Jahi rulers would stop at Lalapet while travelling to the shrine at Moula Ali. The wall constructed using stones and masonry was reportedly almost 15 feet (4.6 m) high and had four darwazas (gateway). The walls and the gateways are being gradually demolished and as of today only two gateways are left.

Vijaya Dairy, one of the oldest dairies at Hyderabad was established in 1967 at Lalapet.
