= Bahadurpally =

- neighbourhood
- Country: India
- State: Telangana
- District: Medchal
- Metro: Hyderabad

Government
  - Body: GHMC

Languages
  - Official: Telugu
- Time zone: UTC+5:30 (IST)
- PIN: 500 043
- Vehicle registration: TG
- Lok Sabha constituency: Malkajgiri
- Vidhan Sabha constituency: Medchal
- Planning agency: GHMC
- Website: telangana.gov.in

Bahadurpally is one of the fastest-growing residential hubs in Hyderabad, located within the Medchal–Malkajgiri district. Situated along National Highway 765D and near Outer Ring Road (ORR) Exit 5 Gandimaisamma, the area features upscale residential layouts surrounded by abundant greenery. It hosts the sprawling Tech Mahindra SEZ Campus and Mahindra University, known for their eco-friendly, low-pollution campuses. Frequently regarded as a major educational corridor, Bahadurpally and its immediate surroundings are home to dozens of prominent engineering colleges.

== Commercial area ==
There are numerous grocery stores and factory outlets in Bahadurpally. The IT Giant 'Tech Mahindra Training Center' is located here.

== Education ==
Mahindra École Centrale and Mallareddy University is a private engineering institute in Tech Mahindra Campus located at Bahadurpally.

== Transport ==
The buses run by TGSRTC connect it to different parts of the city.

From Secunderabad, bus no 227, 272I, 24S/273, 227D, 227K and 224G/219 is available to Bahadurpally Village and Bahadurpally X Roads, where as no 272, 272G, 9M/X, 29B/272G, 189M/272G, 219/272G, 83J/272G, 9X/272G, 9K/230P and 230 are available till Bahadurpally X Roads.
