= Jamia Osmania =

- Neighbourhood
- Location in Telangana, India Jamia Osmania (Telangana) Jamia Osmania (India)
- Coordinates: 17.3935°N 78.5205°E
- Country: India
- State: Telangana
- District: Hyderabad
- Metro: Hyderabad

Government
  - Body: GHMC

Languages
  - Official: Telugu
- Time zone: UTC+5:30 (IST)
- PIN: 500 007
- Vehicle registration: TG
- Lok Sabha constituency: Secunderabad
- Vidhan Sabha constituency: Secunderabad
- Planning agency: GHMC
- Website: telangana.gov.in

Jamia Osmania (often misspelled as Jamai Osmania) is a suburb of Hyderabad, India. It was located in the Hyderabad District, On Telangana, India.

== Education ==
=== Schools ===
- Johnson Grammar School.
- Netaji Public School.
