= Cherlapally =

- Neighbourhood
- Location in Telangana, India Cherlapally (Telangana) Cherlapally (India)
- Coordinates: 17.469902°N 78.59620°E
- Country: India
- State: Telangana
- District: Medchal
- Zone: East
- Circle: Kapra
- Ward: 3
- Elevation: 17.0700 m (56.004 ft)

Languages
  - Official: Telugu
- Time zone: UTC+5:30 (IST)
- PIN: 500051&501302
- Telephone code: 0402726
- Vehicle registration: TG 08

Cherlapally is a neighbourhood of Hyderabad in the Indian state of Telangana. As per the delimitation of election wards by the GHMC, it falls under ward no. 3 of Kapra circle & Kapra Mandal in the East zone. Cherlapally is home to a vast variety of industrial establishments and is well-known for its small scale and manufacturing industry.

Electronics Corporation of India Limited at Cherlapally is being built to manufacture products such as, VVPAT units.

Cherlapally is one among big industrial areas.

== Transport ==
The Area is well connected by TSRTC to the rest of the City, having Bus Depot at Chengicherla. The nearest Railway station is Charlapalli and Nearest Major Terminus is Secunderabad. There is a proposal to upgrade Charlapalli railway station, as a Major Terminus to decongest traffic in Secunderabad Railway Station.

== See also ==
- Cherlapally Central Jail
