= Jahanuma =

- neighbourhood
- Location in Hyderabad Jahanuma (India)
- Coordinates: 17.3386564°N 78.4637332°E
- Country: India
- State: Telangana
- District: Hyderabad

Government
  - Body: GHMC

Languages
  - Official: Urdu
- Time zone: UTC+5:30 (IST)
- PIN: 500053
- Vehicle registration: TG
- Lok Sabha constituency: Hyderabad
- Vidhan Sabha constituency: Bahadurpura
- Planning agency: GHMC
- Website: telangana.gov.in

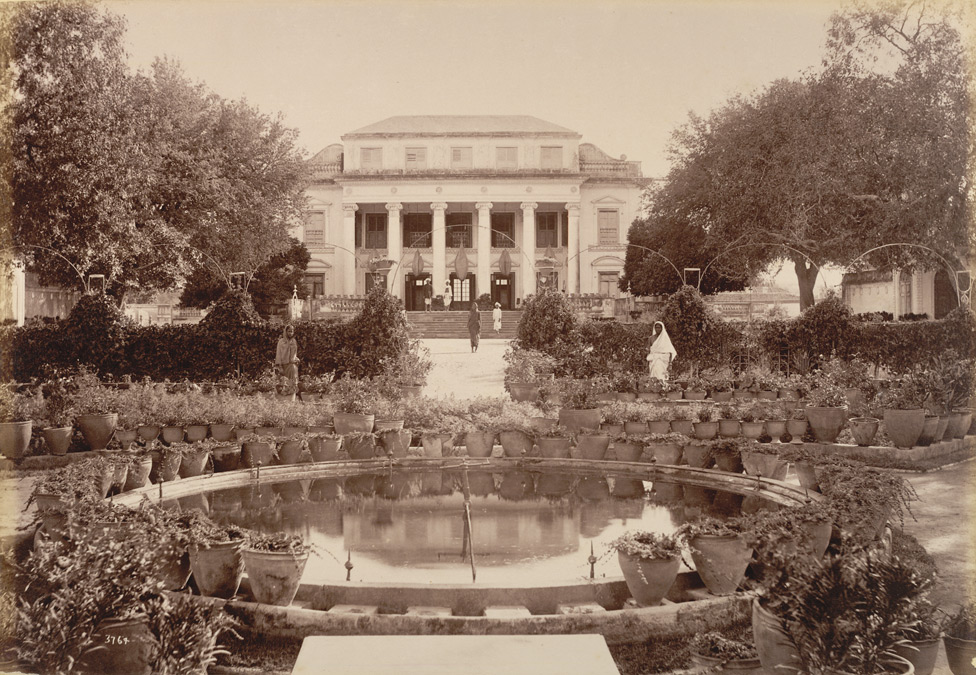
Jahanuma Palace

Jahanuma is a neighbourhood in Hyderabad, Telangana. A light cavalry unit of the Paigahs known as Jahanuma Lancers were once located here. Jahanuma Palace, the residence of Nawab Shams-ul-Umra, one of many palaces owned by the Paigah family was also located here. The palace was demolished after integration of Hyderabad with India and converted into a residential colony. Three gates served as the entry and exit points and still have the original big guard rooms, and are still standing in the Jahanuma locality. These were damaged due to unauthorised constructions coming up in the area.

The Falaknuma Palace, Falaknuma Railway Station and Falaknuma Bus Depot are located in this area.
