= Thumkunta =

- Municipality
- Location in Hyderabad Telangana Location in India
- Coordinates: 17.559428°N 78.55764°E
- Country: India
- State: Telangana

Languages
  - Official: Telugu
- Time zone: UTC+5:30 (IST)
- PIN: 500 078
- Telephone code: 040
- Vehicle registration: TS 07 x XXXX
- Sex ratio: 1:1(approx) ♂/♀

Thumkunta is a municipality in Medchal district in Telangana, India. It is located in the north outskirts of Hyderabad.

It is home to BITS Pilani - Hyderabad Campus and famous recreation clubs such as Aalankrita 4 Star Resort, Summer Green Resort and Domus Resorts. Shri Ramachandra Mission have one of its Spiritual training centres in this village.

The Outer Ring Road (ORR) is connected via Shamirpet.

Thumkunta is 18 km away from Secunderabad railway station and 15 km away from Jubilee Bus Station.
