= Krishna Nagar, Hyderabad =

Sri Krishna Nagar
- neighbourhood
- Location in Telangana, India Sri Krishna Nagar (Telangana) Sri Krishna Nagar (India)
- Coordinates: 17.416471°N 78.438247°E
- Country: India
- State: Telangana
- District: Hyderabad

Government
  - Body: GHMC

Languages
  - Official: Telugu
- Time zone: UTC+5:30 (IST)
- PIN: 500 045
- Lok Sabha constituency: Secunderabad
- Vidhan Sabha constituency: Jubilee Hills
- Planning agency: GHMC

Sri Krishna Nagar is an important commercial & residential area in the west zone of Hyderabad, India. It is adjacent to Jubilee Hills Rd #2 and is well connected to all parts of the city.

This is now a bustling suburb, especially for people working in the Telugu film industry, and also to software professionals. Many cine artists live here. Annapurna studios, a famous landmark, is located nearer to the Krishna Nagar. Also, KBR park, LV Prasad Hospital are just a stone's throw away from Sri Krishna Nagar.

== Commercial area ==
There are many supermarkets and multispeciality hospitals located in this suburb.

== Transport ==
The buses run by TSRTC connect Krishna nagar to all parts of the city. Bus numbers 9c,9y etc. run through this neighbourhood. There is also a mini-bus service called as Setwin service.

The closest MMTS Train station is at Begumpet.
