= Meerpet–Jillelguda =

Meerpet–Jillelaguda Mirpet
- City
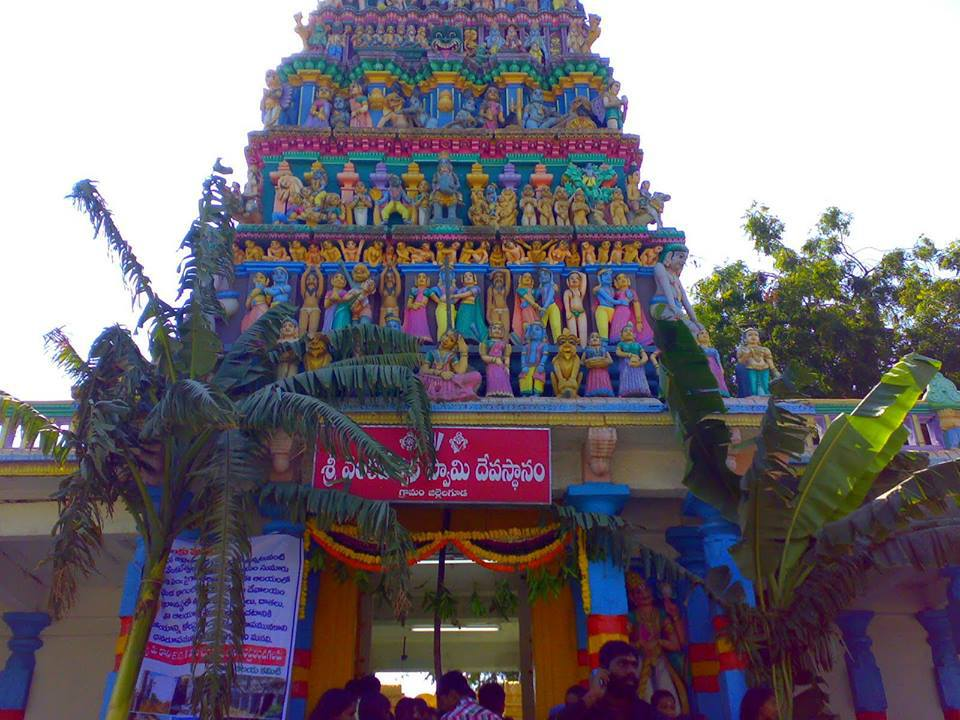
- Jillelguda Venkateswara Temple

- Location in Telangana, India Meerpet–Jillelaguda (Telangana) Meerpet–Jillelaguda (India)
- Coordinates: 17.32°N 78.52°E
- Country: India
- State: Telangana
- District: Rangareddy
- Metro: Hyderabad

Government
  - Type: Greater Hyderabad Municipal Corporation - GHMC
  - Body: Circle-16 Badangpet, Shamshabad Zone

Area
  - Total: 4.2 km^{2} (1.6 sq mi)

Population (2011)
  - Total: 66,982
  - Density: 16,000/km^{2} (41,000/sq mi)

Languages
  - Official: Telugu
- Time zone: UTC+5:30 (IST)
- PIN: 500097 (Meerpet); 500079 (Jillelguda)
- Telephone code: 040
- Vehicle registration: TG
- Parliament constituency: Chevella
- Assembly constituency: Maheshwaram
- Planning agency: Hyderabad Metropolitan Development Authority
- Website: www.ghmc.gov.in

Meerpet–Jillelguda was a satellite city of Hyderabad and is now part of Greater Hyderabad Municipal Corporation and is in Rangareddy district of the Indian state of Telangana.

== Etymology ==
Meerpet got its name due to the presence of Mir Momin masjid constructed by Mir Mu'min Astarabadi– the prime minister of Muhammad Quli Qutb Shah the Fifth king of Qutb Shahi dynasty.

== Demographics ==
As of 2001 India census, Meerpet had a population of 12,940. Males constitute 51% of the population and females 49%. Meerpet has an average literacy rate of 63%, higher than the national average of 59.5%: male literacy is 71%, and female literacy is 54%. In Meerpet, 12% of the population is under 6 years of age.

As per 2011 census, Meerpet–Jillelaguda has a population of 66,982. It had a male and female population of 34,009 and 32,973 receptively. Total number of households were about 18,000.

== Administration ==
As of February 2026, Meerpet Municipality which included meerpet and Jillelguda were merged into GHMC (Greater Hyderabad Municipal Corporation - Core GHMC, which Covers central and southern zones Charminar, Golconda, Khairatabad, Secunderabad, Rajendranagar, Shamshabad) under circle 16 - Badangpet of Shamshabad Zone. Earlier both Meerpet and Jillelguda were formed as Meerpet Municipal Corporation in 2019 by upgrading respective gram panchayats. The municipal corporation was formed after merging gram panchayats of Meerpet and Jillelguda. Before that Meerpet Gram panchayat and Jillelguda Gram panchayat were separate administrations.

== Transport ==
Meerpet–Jillelaguda is connected to other places within Hyderabad via the TSRTC, with buses available from the DSNR and Midani bus depots. The nearest MMTS station is at Malakpet.The nearest airport is Hyderabad's Rajiv Gandhi International Airport. The nearest Metro station is at LB Nagar.

== Landmarks ==
A 500-year-old Venkateswara temple, known as Matsya Avatara Kalyana Venkateswara Swamy Temple has its presence in this town.

Three of its lakes (Pedda Cheruvu, Mantrala Cheruvu and Chandana Cheruvu ) were developed by previous administration and now they have become landmarks of the area with walking tracks around the lake and kid play areas.

== Hospitals & clinics ==
Sri Health Plus Children's & Family Clinic, R.N.Reddy Nagar, Meerpet.
