= Neknampur =

Coordinates: 28°30′N 77°40′E

- Village
- Interactive map of Neknampur
- Country: India
- State: Telangana
- District: Ranga Reddy
- Metro: Rangareddy district

Government
  - Body: Mandal Office

Languages
  - Official: Telugu
- Time zone: UTC+5:30 (IST)
- Planning agency: Panchayat
- Civic agency: Mandal Office

Neknampur is a village and panchayat in Ranga Reddy district, Telangana, India. It falls under Puppalaguda.
