= Chintalakunta =

- Neighbourhood
- Location in Telangana Chintalakunta (India)
- Coordinates: 17.348426°N 78.550959°E
- Country: India
- State: Telangana
- District: Ranga Reddy
- Metro: Hyderabad

Government
  - Body: GHMC

Languages
  - Official: Telugu
- Time zone: UTC+5:30 (IST)
- Vehicle registration: TG
- Lok Sabha constituency: Hyderabad
- Vidhan Sabha constituency: L.B. Nagar
- Planning agency: GHMC

Chintalakunta is a residential neighbourhood in L. B. Nagar suburb of Hyderabad, Telangana, India. In the 1980s it was a sleepy village on the outskirts of Hyderadbad. There is a checkpost here which is quite popular as a landmark.
