= Kuntloor =

- Village
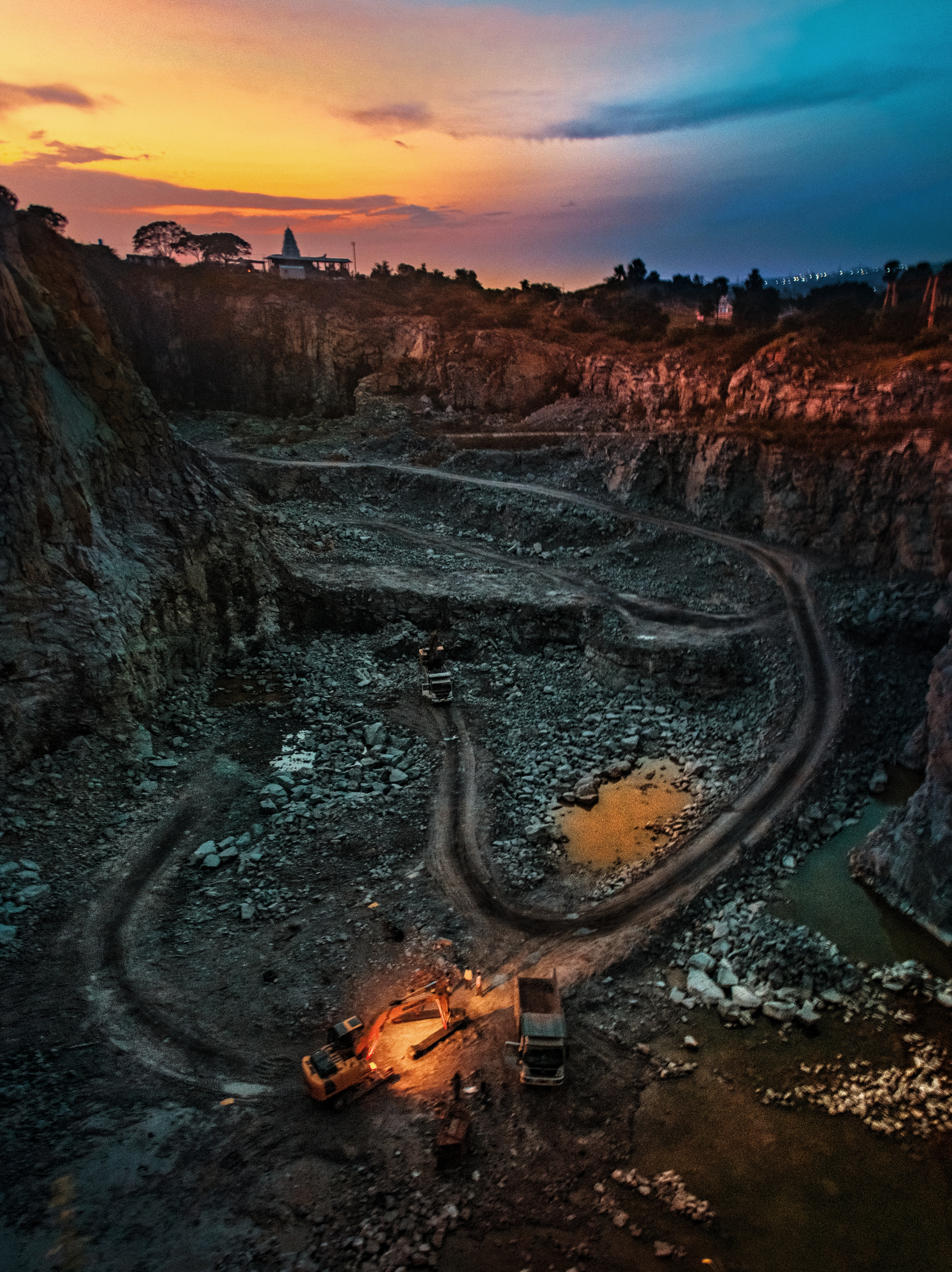
- Quarry near Kuntloor
- Country: India

Languages
  - Official: Telugu
- Time zone: UTC+5:30 (IST)
- Telephone code: 040
- Vehicle registration: AP-29 X XXXX

Kuntloor is a village in Rangareddy district in Telangana, India. It falls under Abdullapurmet mandal. It is 3 km from the Outer Ring Road, Hyderabad. Kuntloor (Nagarapanchaithi under Pedda Amberpet)

Kashi Bugga Ramalayam is the famous place, this is a temple constructed before the 16th century. Every year sri Ramanavami is celebrated very grandly for 10 days.

Kuntloor Village 7 km From Inner Ring Road LB Nagar and Adj.to Mother Dairy, nearby Hayth Nagar N.H-9 Kuntloor is historical village.

Sri Vedavyasa Pathashala is one of the popular places in Navodaya Enclave in Kuntloor.
