= Moosapet =

- Neighbourhood
- Location in Telangana, India Moosapet (Telangana) Moosapet (India)
- Coordinates: 17°29′N 78°25′E
- Country: India
- State: Telangana
- District: Medchal-Malkajgiri district
- Metro: Hyderabad Metropolitan Region

Government
  - Body: GHMC

Languages
  - Official: Telugu
- Time zone: UTC+5:30 (IST)
- PIN: 500 018
- Vehicle registration: TG
- Lok Sabha constituency: Malkajgiri
- Vidhan Sabha constituency: Kukatpally
- Planning agency: GHMC
- Civic agency: GHMC

Moosapet is a neighbourhood in Hyderabad, India, And also a part of Greater Hyderabad. The suburb is 3 km (1.9 mi) from KPHB Colony and 5 km (3.1 mi) from Madhapur. Kukatpally Y junction is located in this area. It is administered as Ward No. 117 of the Greater Hyderabad Municipal Corporation. Kamuni Cheruvu is an important lake in Moosapet.

== Commercial area ==
Laxmi Narasimha Swamy temple, Patidar building, an auditorium, is an old landmark in this suburb.

The German retail giant, Metro Cash & Carry is located here.

== Transport ==
Moosapet is well connected by TSRTC buses and is home to its Kukatpally Bus depot.
