= Gundlapochampally =

Gundlapochampally గుండ్లపోచంపల్లి
- Neighbourhood
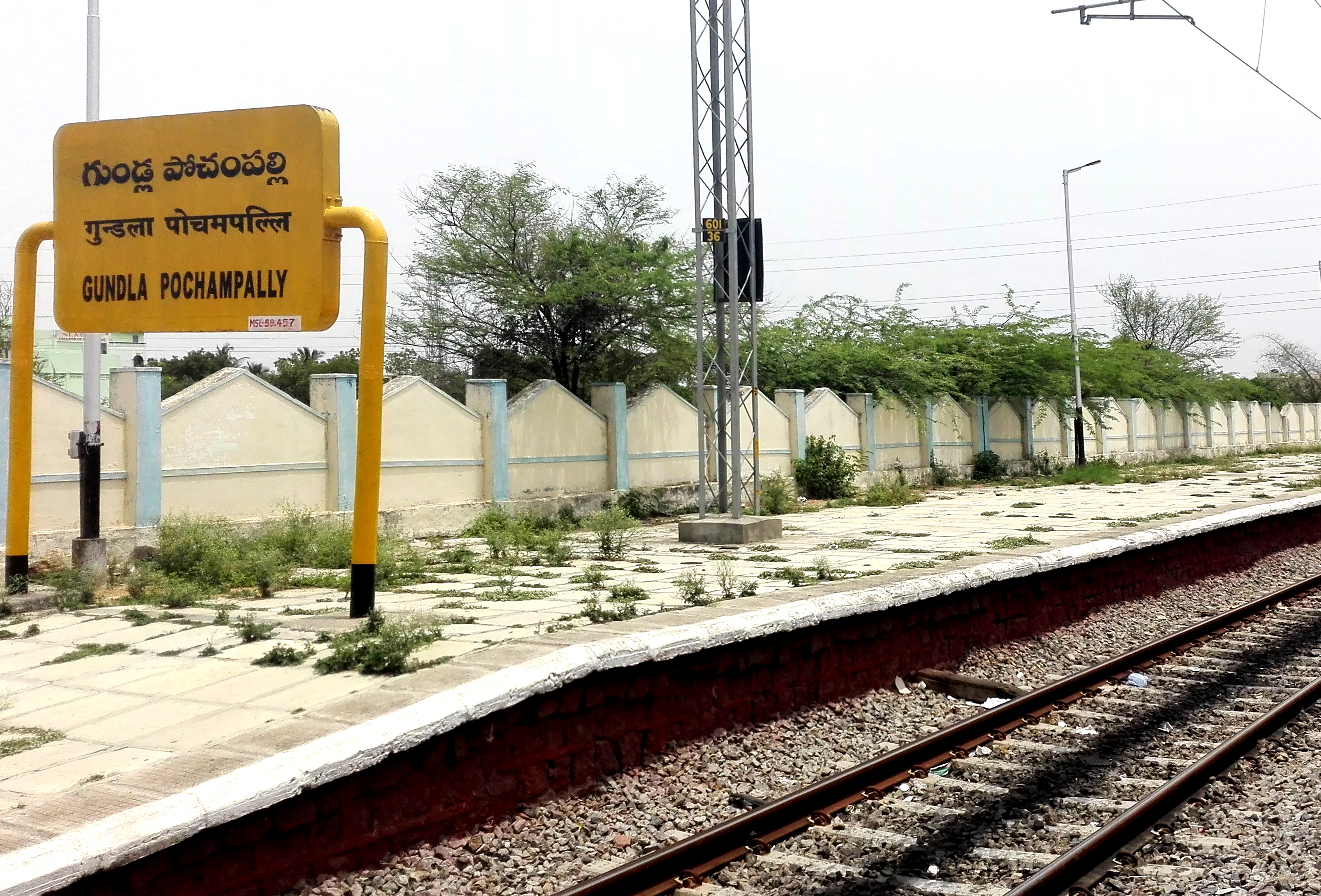

- Location in Telangana, India Gundlapochampally (India)
- Coordinates: 17.56706°N 78.47732°E
- Country: India
- State: Telangana
- District: Medchal–Malkajgiri district
- Mandal: Medchal
- Metropolitan area: Hyderabad

Government
  - Type: Municipal Corporation
  - Body: Cyberabad Municipal Corporation
- Time zone: UTC+5:30 (IST)
- PIN code: 500100
- Vehicle registration: TG-08

Gundlapochampally is a neighbourhood in the northern part of Hyderabad in Medchal–Malkajgiri district, Telangana, India. It is located in Medchal Mandal and forms part of the Hyderabad Metropolitan Region. The locality is served by Gundlapochampally railway station and is located near National Highway 44 and Outer Ring Road

Gundlapochampally was constituted as a municipality on 2 August 2018 by the Government of Telangana through the merger of Gundlapochampally, Kandlakoya, Baseregadi, Gnanapur and Arkelaguda gram panchayats.

Following the reorganisation of urban local bodies in Telangana, Gundlapochampally became part of the Cyberabad Municipal Corporation.

== Geography ==
Gundlapochampally is located in Medchal mandal of Medchal–Malkajgiri district. It lies in the northern suburbs of Hyderabad and forms part of the Hyderabad metropolitan region.

== History ==
=== Formation Of Municipality ===
Gundlapochampally Municipality was constituted on 2 August 2018 by the Government of Telangana. The municipality was formed by merging the gram panchayats of Gundlapochampally, Kandlakoya, Baseregadi, Gnanapur and Arkelaguda.

=== Urban Administrative Reorganisation ===
In December 2025, the Government of Telangana reorganised the Greater Hyderabad Municipal Corporation (GHMC) area into 12 zones and 60 circles and approved delimitation into 300 wards through G.O.Ms.No.291 and G.O.Ms.No.292 dated 24 December 2025.

In February 2026, the Government of Telangana reorganised the expanded GHMC area into three municipal corporations — the Greater Hyderabad Municipal Corporation, Cyberabad Municipal Corporation and Malkajgiri Municipal Corporation.

== Administration ==
Gundlapochampally is administered by the Cyberabad Municipal Corporation (CMC). It falls under the Quthbullapur Zone and Medchal Circle of the corporation.

According to G.O.Ms.No.292 dated 24 December 2025, Gundlapochampally is designated as **Ward No. 299** under Circle 60 – Medchal, Quthbullapur Zone.

== Transport ==
Gundlapochampally is connected by road through National Highway 44. The locality is served by Gundlapochampally railway station, providing suburban rail connectivity towards Hyderabad and Secunderabad.

The locality is situated near the Hyderabad Outer Ring Road.

== Economy ==
Gundlapochampally is part of the northern urban corridor of Hyderabad and has residential and industrial activity associated with the wider Medchal–Malkajgiri region.

== See also ==
- Cyberabad Municipal Corporation
- Medchal–Malkajgiri district
- Hyderabad
