= Borabanda =

- neighbourhood
- Location in Hyderabad, India Borabanda (India)
- Coordinates: 17°27′N 78°24′E
- Country: India
- State: Telangana
- District: Hyderabad
- Metro: Hyderabad

Government
  - Body: GHMC

Languages
  - Official: Telugu, Urdu, English, Hindi
- Time zone: UTC+5:30 (IST)
- PIN: 500 018
- Vehicle registration: TG
- Lok Sabha constituency: Secunderabad
- Vidhan Sabha constituency: Jubilee Hills
- Planning agency: GHMC
- Website: telangana.gov.in

Borabanda is a residential area in Hyderabad, Telangana, India. It is close to Erragadda, Kukatpally, Jubilee Hills and Madhapur. It is administered as Ward No. 103 of Greater Hyderabad Municipal Corporation.

Borabanda is divided into many sub-areas like Moti Nagar, Kalyan Nagar, Tulasi Nagar, Parvat Nagar, and Rana Pratap Nagar.

The place is known for the Bonalu Festival, the state festival of Telangana.

== Places of worship ==
- Methodist church-Srt Nagar, Borabanda
- Sai baba temple at bus stop
- Masjid-e-Tawheed Ahle Hadees, site-3, Borabanda
- St Francis Xavier, Peeli Dargah
- Noor Masjid. Borabanda
- Nalla pochamma temple, Parvatnagar
- Sri Sri Sri Katta Maisamma temple, Sunam Cheruvu

== Transportation ==
Borabanda railway station of the Hyderabad Multi-Modal Transport System provides railway transport towards Falaknuma, Lingampally and Nampally.

TGSRTC also provides bus connectivity to the neighbourhood.

From Kukatpally or JNTU one can reach Borabanda via the Khaitalapur bridge.
