= Jalpally =

- Town
- Location in Hyderabad, India Jalpally (Telangana) Jalpally (India)
- Coordinates: 17.281169°N 78.45056°E
- Country: India
- State: Telangana

Languages
  - Official: URDU,Telugu
- Time zone: UTC+5:30 (IST)
- Telephone code: 040
- Vehicle registration: TS-26 X XXXX
- Sex ratio: 1:1(approx) ♂/♀
- Website: telangana.gov.in

Jalpally is a satellite town of Hyderabad in Rangareddy district of the Indian state of Telangana.

== Government ==
Jalpally municipality is the civic body of the town. On 11 April 2016, the gram panchayats of Jalpally Kothapet, Pahari Sharif and Balapur were merged to form Jalpally Municipality.

== Jalpally lake ==
Jalpally lake was used for the construction of Charminar and Mecca Masjid.
