= Kothapet, Hyderabad =

Kothapet
- suburb
- Location in Telangana, India Kothapet (Telangana) Kothapet (India)
- Coordinates: 17.376197°N 78.546053°E
- Country: India
- State: Telangana
- District: Ranga Reddy
- Zone: East
- Circle: L.B.Nagar/Gaddiannaram
- Ward: 8

Government
  - Body: GHMC

Population (2011)
  - Total: 33,684

Languages
  - Official: Telugu
- Time zone: UTC+5:30 (IST)
- PIN: 500 035
- Vehicle registration: TS
- Lok Sabha constituency: Malkajgiri
- Vidhan Sabha constituency: Maheshwaram
- Planning agency: GHMC

Kothapet is a major commercial and residential suburb of Hyderabad, in Telangana state of India located around a strip of NH65. It belongs to Maheshwaram constituency of Ranga Reddy district.

== History ==
Kothapet village was a gram panchayat until the passage of Government Order by the erstwhile Andhra Pradesh government wherein it was absorbed into the Hyderabad Metropolitan Development Authority region thereby subsuming the municipality into the municipal corporation. The merger of the village into the municipality was challenged subsequently in a petition to the Telangana High Court, but the challenge was quashed due to lack of merit.

== Economy ==
Kothapet houses one of largest fruit markets in the state of Telangana, and is an upcoming real estate destination. Owing to the congestion due to local businesses, it was proposed that the market in Gaddiannaram be shifted to Koheda.

== Transport ==
The locality is served by TSRTC bus stops and Chaitanyapuri Metro Station of the Hyderabad Metro Rail Red Line Corridor.

== Institutes ==
- Hamstech Institute of Fashion & Interior Design is located here.
