= Badangpet =

- City
- Location in Telangana State, India Badangpet (Telangana) Badangpet (India)
- Coordinates: 17.3047°N 78.515°E
- Country: India
- State: Telangana

Government
  - Body: Badangpet Municipal Corporation

Languages
  - Official: Telugu
- Time zone: UTC+5:30 (Indian Standard Time)
- Postal code: 500058
- Telephone code: 08415
- Vehicle registration: TS 08

Badangpet is a satellite city of Hyderabad located in Rangareddy district of Telangana, India. It is one of the 13 Municipal Corporations in Telangana. It is newly constituted as Municipal Corporation from Nagar Panchayat, which was formed on 26 March 2013. It was formed by merging (8) erstwhile villages i.e. 1. Badangpet 2. Almasguda 3. Nadergul 4. Kurmalguda 5. Gurramguda 6. Balapur (part) 7. Venkatapur and 8. Mamidipally. The area of the ULB is 74.56 Sq. km. Population as per 2011 Census is 64579 and presently it is estimated to be at 100000.

== Greater Hyderabad Municipal Corporation (GHMC) ==
Badangpet is located in the vicinity of the office of Greater Hyderabad Municipal Corporation (GHMC). Hyderabad city is also the capital city of Telangana State. Initially developed as a residential hub, it has a very fast increase in population.

== History ==
The name Badangpet came from a ruler named Badangi who ruled this area in the Deccan sultanate period. The old village has beautiful historical monuments such as button Gutta [ Watchtower ] Fort walls and ancient shiva-Vishnu temple named Kasi Bugga.
