= Pahari Sharif =

Village in Hyderabad, India

Pahadi Shareef is a village located in the suburbs of Hyderabad, India. This village is famous for the Dargah of Syed Shah Baba Sharfuddin Sohrawardi.
