= Nallakunta =

- Neighbourhood
- Location in Hyderabad, India Nallakunta (India)
- Coordinates: 17.398558°N 78.508043°E
- Country: India
- State: Telangana
- District: Hyderabad
- Metro: Hyderabad

Languages
  - Official: Telugu
- Time zone: UTC+5:30 (IST)
- PIN: 500 044
- Vehicle registration: TG
- Lok Sabha constituency: Secunderabad
- Vidhan Sabha constituency: Amberpet
- Planning agency: GHMC
- Website: telangana.gov.in

Nallakunta is a neighbourhood in Hyderabad, in the state of Telangana, India.

== Administration ==
Amrutha Y is the (BJP) GHMC Corporator of Nallakunta Division.

== Transport ==
The TSRTC connects Nallakunta to other parts of the city. The closest MMTS Train station is at Vidyanagar near Durgabai Deshmukh Hospital.

== Education ==
Nallakunta is a major educational hub.

Many IIT-JEE Coaching Institutes are located in Nallakunta. Students from across India come to these institutes to prepare for IIT-JEE.

== Culture ==
The Sringeri Shankar Math is the oldest of the branch maths in Hyderabad. The Pratishtha kumbhabhishekam of the temples was performed by the 35th Jagadguru Shankaracharya Sri Sri Abhinava Vidyatirtha Mahaswamiji on the day of Akshaya Tritiya in 1960. Navaratri is celebrated here with rituals and cultural programs.
