= Hafeezpet =

- Neighbourhood
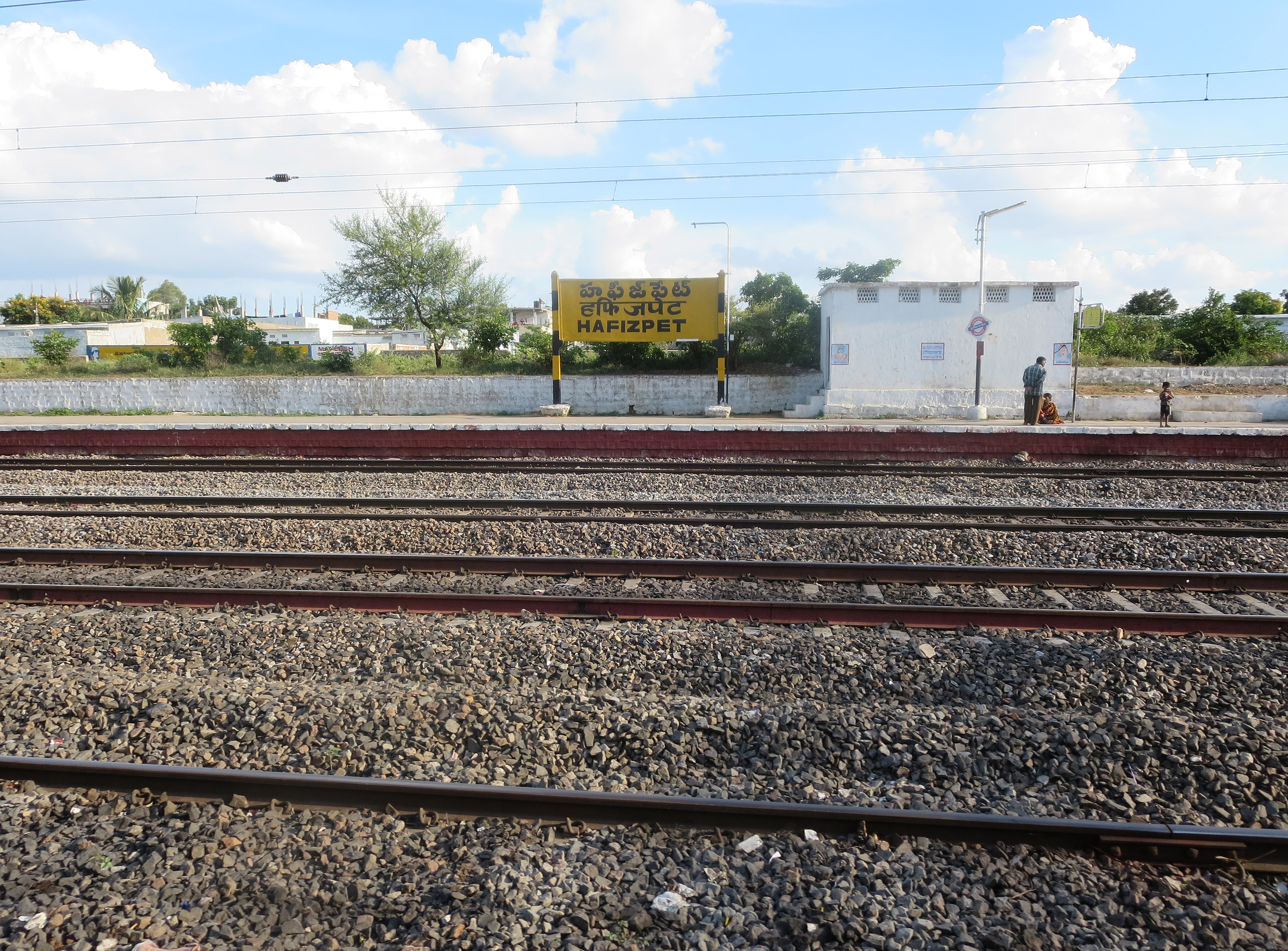
- Hafeezpet MMTS station
- Interactive map of Hafeezpet
- Coordinates: 17.48633°N 78.36415°E
- Country: India
- State: Telangana State
- District: RANGAREDDY
- Metro: Hyderabad

Government
  - Body: GHMC

Languages
  - Official: Telugu, Urdu
- Time zone: UTC+5:30 (IST)
- PIN: 500 049
- Vehicle registration: TG 07
- Lok Sabha constituency: Chevella
- Vidhan Sabha constituency: Serilingampally
- Planning agency: GHMC
- Website: telangana.gov.in

Hafeezpet is a neighborhood in Hyderabad, India. It is close to Kukatpally, Madhapur and Miyapur. This is further divided into two parts, Old Hafeezpet and New Hafeezpet. It is administered as Ward No. 109 of Greater Hyderabad Municipal Corporation.

== Public transport ==
Hafeezpet is only 4 to 5 km (2.5 to 3.1 mi) away from Madhapur HiTech City. It has MMTS Railway Station and the TSRTC Bus Number for Hafeezpet are 222 (Koti-Lingampally-Patanchoru), 10H (Allwayn Colony - Secundrabad), 216 K/L (Lingampally - Mehdipatnam).

As it is located within the city it has all mode of transport. The zip/pin code for Hafeezpet is 500049 Miyapur PO.
