= Balanagar, Medchal district =

Balanagar
- Neighbourhood
- Location in Telangana, India Balanagar (Telangana) Balanagar (India)
- Coordinates: 17.478725°N 78.446792°E
- Country: India
- State: Telangana
- District: Medchal–Malkajgiri

Area
  - Total: 11.34 km^{2} (4.38 sq mi)

Population (2020)
  - Total: 96,449
  - Density: 8,504/km^{2} (22,030/sq mi)

Languages
  - Official: Telugu
- Time zone: UTC+5:30 (IST)
- PIN: 500042
- Vehicle registration: TG-08

Balanagar is a neighbourhood of Hyderabad. It is located in Medchal-Malkajgiri district of the Indian state of Telangana. It is under the administration of Balanagar mandal of Malkajgiri revenue division. It was a part of Ranga Reddy district before the re-organisation of districts in the state. It is administered as Ward No. 120 of the Greater Hyderabad Municipal Corporation.
