= Mallapur =

Mallapur Mallapuram
- Neighbourhood
- Location in Telangana, India Mallapur (Telangana) Mallapur (India)
- Coordinates: 17.45°N 78.57°E
- Country: India
- State: Telangana
- District: Medchal-Malkajgiri

Languages
  - Official: Telugu
- Time zone: UTC+5:30 (IST)
- PIN: 500076
- Vehicle registration: TG

Mallapur, also known as Mallapuram before the 2000s, is a neighbourhood in Hyderabad in the Indian state of Telangana. It falls under Uppal mandal of Medchal-Malkajgiri district. It is administered as Ward No. 5 of Greater Hyderabad Municipal Corporation.

== Climate ==
Mallapur

Climate chart (precipitation, max. and min. temperature)
J	F	M	A	M	J	J	A	S	O	N	D
3.2 29 15	5.2 32 17	12 35 20	21 38 24	37 39 26	96 34 24	164 31 23	171 30 22	182 30 22	91 30 20	16 29 16	6.1 28 14
- █ Average max. and min. temperatures in °C
- █ Precipitation totals in mm
- Source: World Weather Information Service
Imperial conversion
J	F	M	A	M	J	J	A	S	O	N	D
0.1 83 58	0.2 89 63	0.5 95 69	0.8 100 75	1.5 102 79	3.8 94 75	6.5 87 73	6.7 85 72	7.1 86 71	3.6 87 68	0.6 84 62	0.2 82 57
- █ Average max. and min. temperatures in °F
- █ Precipitation totals in inches

Mallapur, Hyderabad has a tropical savanna climate with hot summers from late February to early June, the monsoon season from late June to early October and a pleasant winter from late October to early February. In the evenings and mornings the climate is generally cooler because of the city's good elevation. Hyderabad gets about 32 inches (about 810 mm) of rain every year, almost all of it concentrated in the monsoon months. The highest temperature ever recorded was 45.5 ^{o} C (113.9 °F) on 2 June 1966, while the lowest recorded temperature was 6.1^{o} C (43 °F) on 8 January 1946.
