= Nallagandla =

Nallagandla Rangareddy Serilingampally zone
- Town
- Nickname: Upcoming urban concrete jungle
- Location in Telangana Nallagandla (Telangana) Nallagandla (India)
- Country: India
- State: Telangana,
- District: Ranga Reddy
- Named for: Apartments , Villas and Gated Communities

Government
  - Type: Greater Cyberabad Municipal Corporation
  - Body: GCMC, SERILINGAMPALLY HYDERABAD

Population (2026)
  - Total: 500,000

Languages
  - Official: Telugu, Urdu
- Time zone: UTC+5:30 (IST)
- Pin code at: 500019
- Vehicle registration: TG-07 RTA at Manikonda&Kondapur

Nallagandla is a posh residential area in the north-western part of Hyderabad, India. Nallagandla is located in Serilingampally mandal of Ranga Reddy district.
