= Dundigal =

Mandal in Telangana

- Mandal
- Dundigal
- Location in Hyderabad, India
- Coordinates: 17.578135°N 78.428811°E
- Country: India
- State: Telangana
- District: Medchal-Malkajgiri district
- Metro: Hyderabad

Government
  - Body: Dundigal municipality

Area
  - Total: 65 km^{2} (25 sq mi)

Population (2011)
  - Total: 40,817
  - Density: 630/km^{2} (1,600/sq mi)

Languages
  - Official: Telugu
- Time zone: UTC+5:30 (IST)
- PIN: 500043
- Vehicle registration: TS
- Parliament constituency: Malkajgiri
- Assembly constituency: Quthbullapur
- Planning agency: HMDA
- Website: dundigalmunicipality.telangana.gov.in

Dundigal, officially Dundigal Gandimaisamma, is a mandal and a municipality in the Medchal-Malkajgiri district in the Indian state of Telangana. It is the headquarters of the Dundigal mandal in the Malkajgiri revenue division of Medchal-Malkajgiri district.

Indian Air Force has an academy here.

== History ==
It was a part of Ranga Reddy district before the re-organisation of districts in the state on 11 October 2016.
