= Gaddiannaram =

- Neighbourhood
- Location in Telangana, India Gaddiannaram (Telangana) Gaddiannaram (India)
- Coordinates: 17.368784°N 78.524652°E
- Country: India
- State: Telangana
- District: Ranga Reddy
- Metro: Hyderabad

Government
  - Body: GHMC (Greater Hyderabad Municipal Corporation)

Population (2011)
  - Total: 30,422

Languages
  - Official: Telugu
- Time zone: UTC+5:30 (IST)
- PIN: 500 060
- Vehicle registration: TS
- Lok Sabha constituency: Nalgonda
- Vidhan Sabha constituency: Malakpet
- Planning agency: GHMC
- Civic agency: Gaddiannaram Municipality

Gaddiannaram is a suburb in Hyderabad, Telangana, India. It is located close to the major commercial center, Dilsukhnagar.

== Transport ==
Gaddiannaram has a major bus depot owned by TSRTC, and is therefore well connected to all parts of the city.

The closest MMTS train station is at Malakpet.
