= L. B. Nagar =

LB Nagar Lal Bahadur Nagar
- Neighbourhood
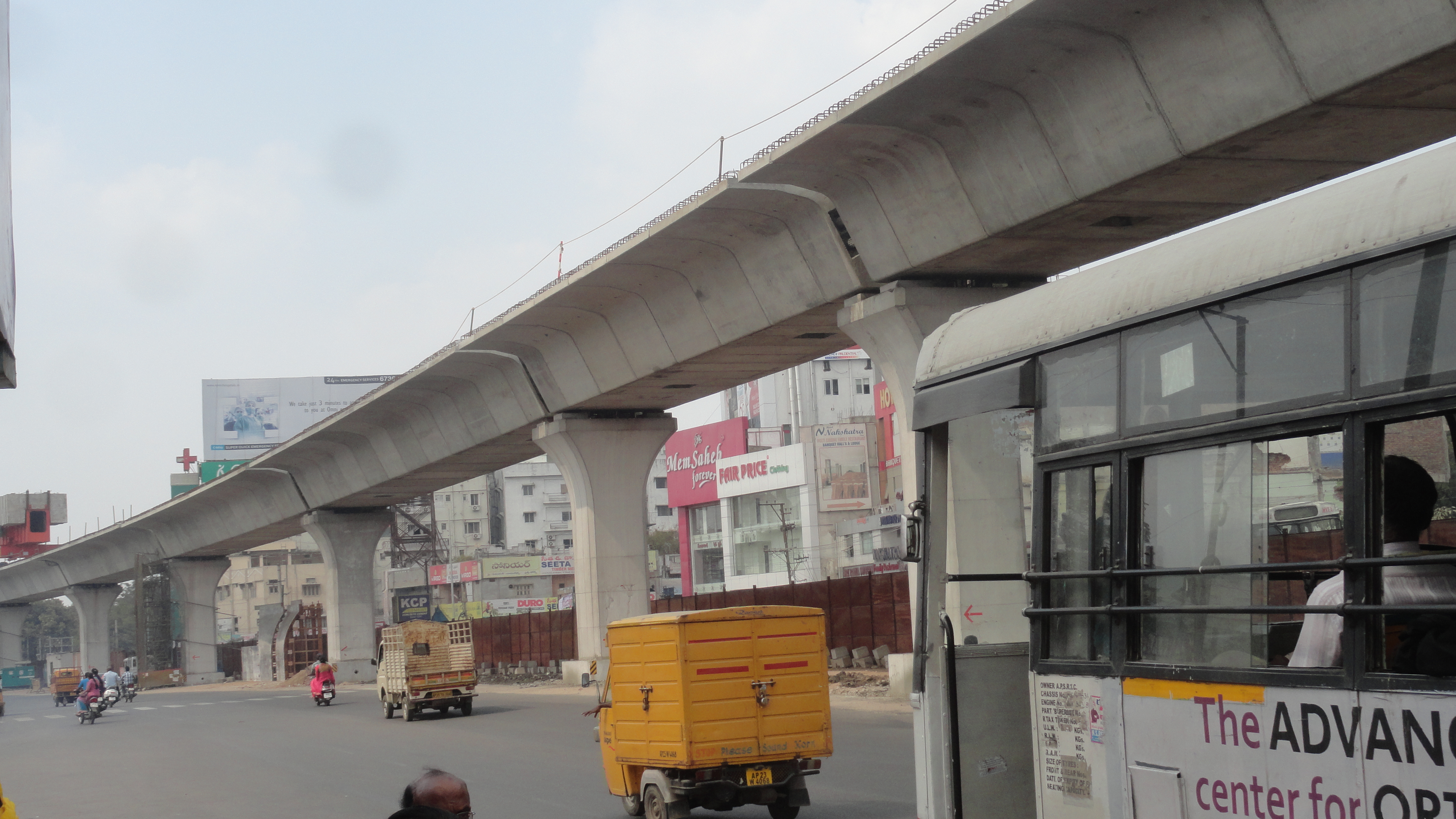
- LB Nagar Main road

- Location in Hyderabad Location in Telangana, India LB Nagar (India)
- Coordinates: 17.348426°N 78.550959°E
- Country: India
- State: Telangana
- District: Ranga Reddy
- City: Hyderabad

Government
  - MLA: Devi Reddy Sudheer Reddy (TRS) (

Population (2001)
  - Total: 261,987

Languages
  - Official: Telugu
- Time zone: UTC+5:30 (IST)
- PIN: 500 074
- Telephone code: 91 040
- Vehicle registration: TG
- Website: telangana.gov.in

Lal Bahadur Nagar, commonly known as L. B. Nagar, is a commercial and residential hub in Hyderabad, Telangana, India. It was once a Municipality in Ranga Reddy district.

== Demographics ==
As of 2011 India census, L.B. Nagar had a population of 261,987. Males constitute 52% of the population and females 48%. L.B. Nagar has an average literacy rate of 74%, higher than the national average of 79.5%: male literacy is 64%, and female literacy is 52%. In L.B. Nagar, 21% of the population is under 6 years of age.

== Healthcare ==
LB Nagar is surrounded with hospitals like Kamineni Hospital, LB Nagar Hospital etc. and diagnostic centres like Sprint Diagnostics, LB Nagar Diagnostics etc.

Locations neighbouring LB Nagar like Dilsukhnagar, Hayathnagar, Nagole and Uppal have good hospital and diagnostic centres.

== Politics ==
L. B. Nagar is a constituency in the Telangana Legislative Assembly. The leading party after the 2018 Telangana state legislative assembly elections is Telangana Rashtra Samiti. Devireddy Sudheer Reddy is the member of legislative assembly from the constituency. The assembly constituency presently comprises the following neighbourhoods:

Neighbourhood	Districts
L. B. Nagar	Ranga Reddy
Karmanghat	Ranga Reddy
Lingojiguda	Ranga Reddy
Vanasthalipuram	Ranga Reddy
Hayath Nagar	Ranga Reddy
Dilsukhnagar	Ranga Reddy
Saroornagar (part)	Ranga Reddy
Gaddiannaram (part)	Ranga Reddy
B. N. Reddy Nagar	Ranga Reddy

== Gallery ==
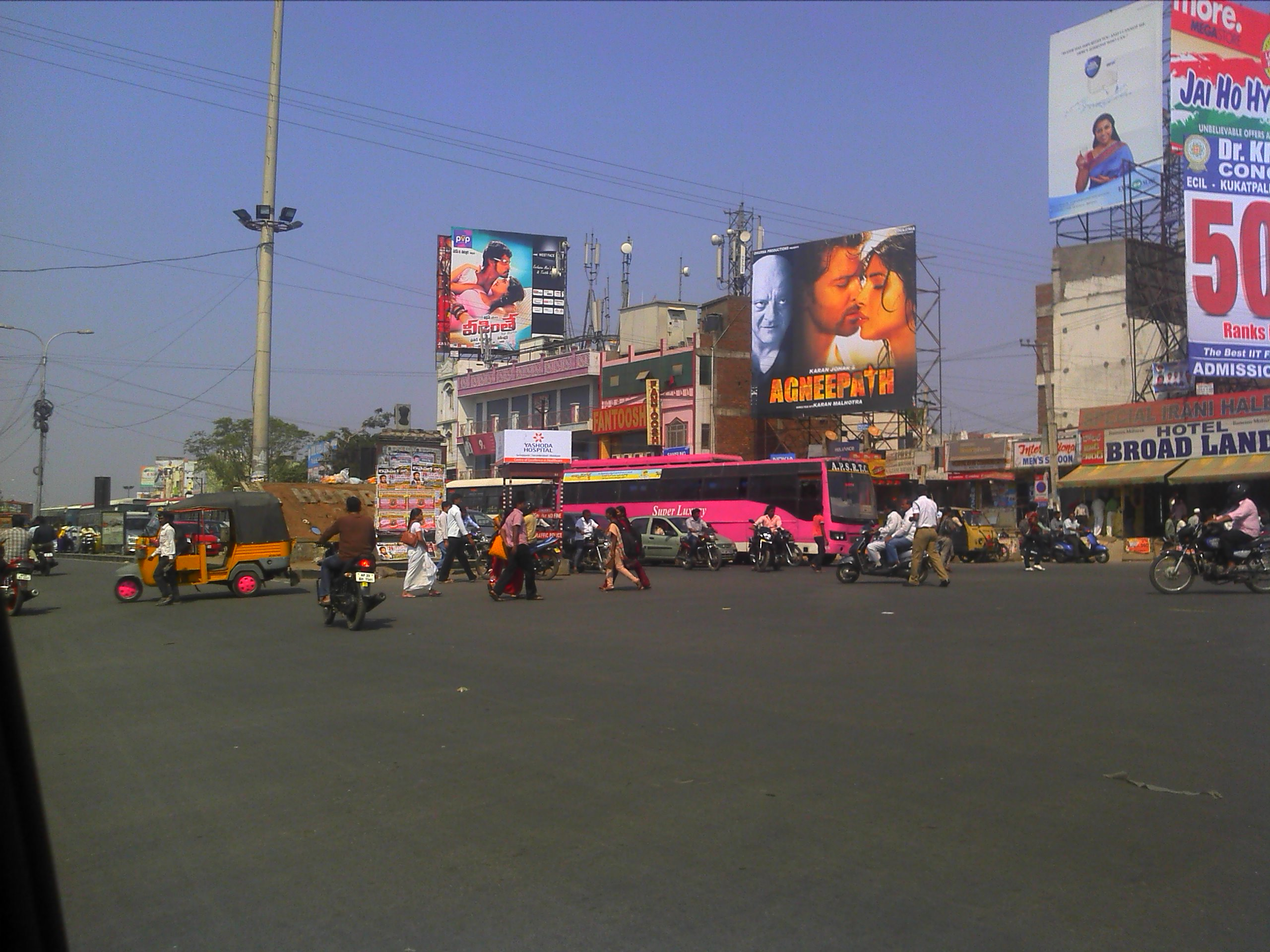
L.B.Nagar Chowrastha

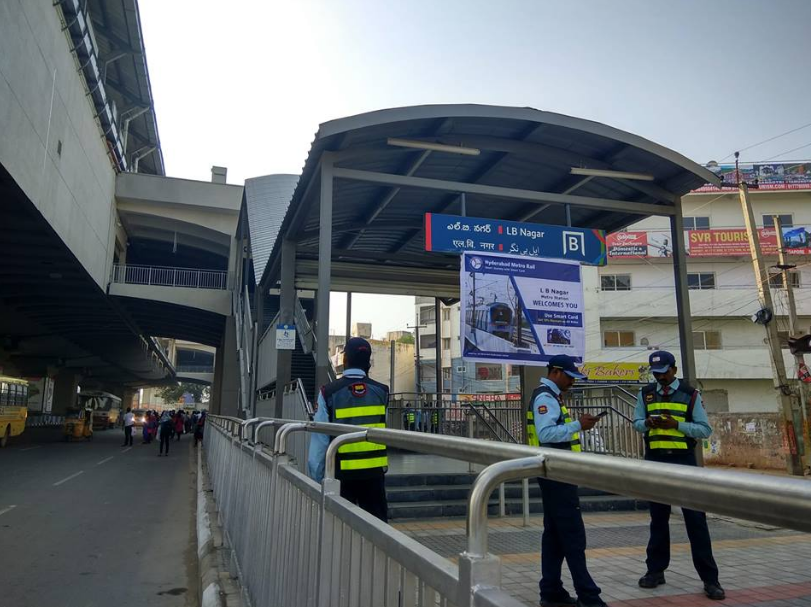
LB Nagar metro station
