= Quthbullapur =

Village in India

- Town
- Location in Telangana, India Quthbullapur (Telangana) Quthbullapur (India)
- Coordinates: 17.499313°N 78.458261°E
- Country: India
- State: Telangana
- District: Medchal-Malkajgiri district
- City: Hyderabad
- Established: 1920
- Founder: Osman Ali Khan

Population (2001)
  - Total: 225,816

Languages
  - Official: Telugu
- Time zone: UTC+5:30 (IST)
- Postal code: 500037
- Vehicle registration: TG-07
- MLA: K. P. Vivekanand Goud

Quthbullapur is a Town in Hyderabad in the Medchal-Malkajgiri district of the Indian state of Telangana. It is the mandal headquarters of Quthbullapur mandal in Malkajgiri revenue division. The mandal was a part of Ranga Reddy district before the re-organisation of districts in the state. It was a municipality prior to its merger into the Greater Hyderabad Municipal Corporation.

== Demographics ==
As of 2001 India census, Quthbullapur had a population of 225,816. Males constitute 52% of the population and females 48%. Quthbullapur has an average literacy rate of 67%, higher than the national average of 59.5%: male literacy is 73%, and female literacy is 60%. In Quthbullapur, 14% of the population is under 6 years of age.

== Election Information ==
Quthbullapur Constituency is New Constituency. It is formed after Delimitation. 2009 Election is first election in this constituency.

Assembly Election Results in 2009 – Kuna Srisailam Goud Won with 34.12 votes %

Assembly Election Results in 2014 – K. P. Vivekanand Goud Won with 42.12 votes %

Assembly Election Results in 2018 – K. P. Vivekanand Goud Won with 53.39 votes %

Assembly Election Results in 2023 −K. P. Vivekanand Goud Won with 46.8 votes %
