= Khajaguda =

- Neighbourhood
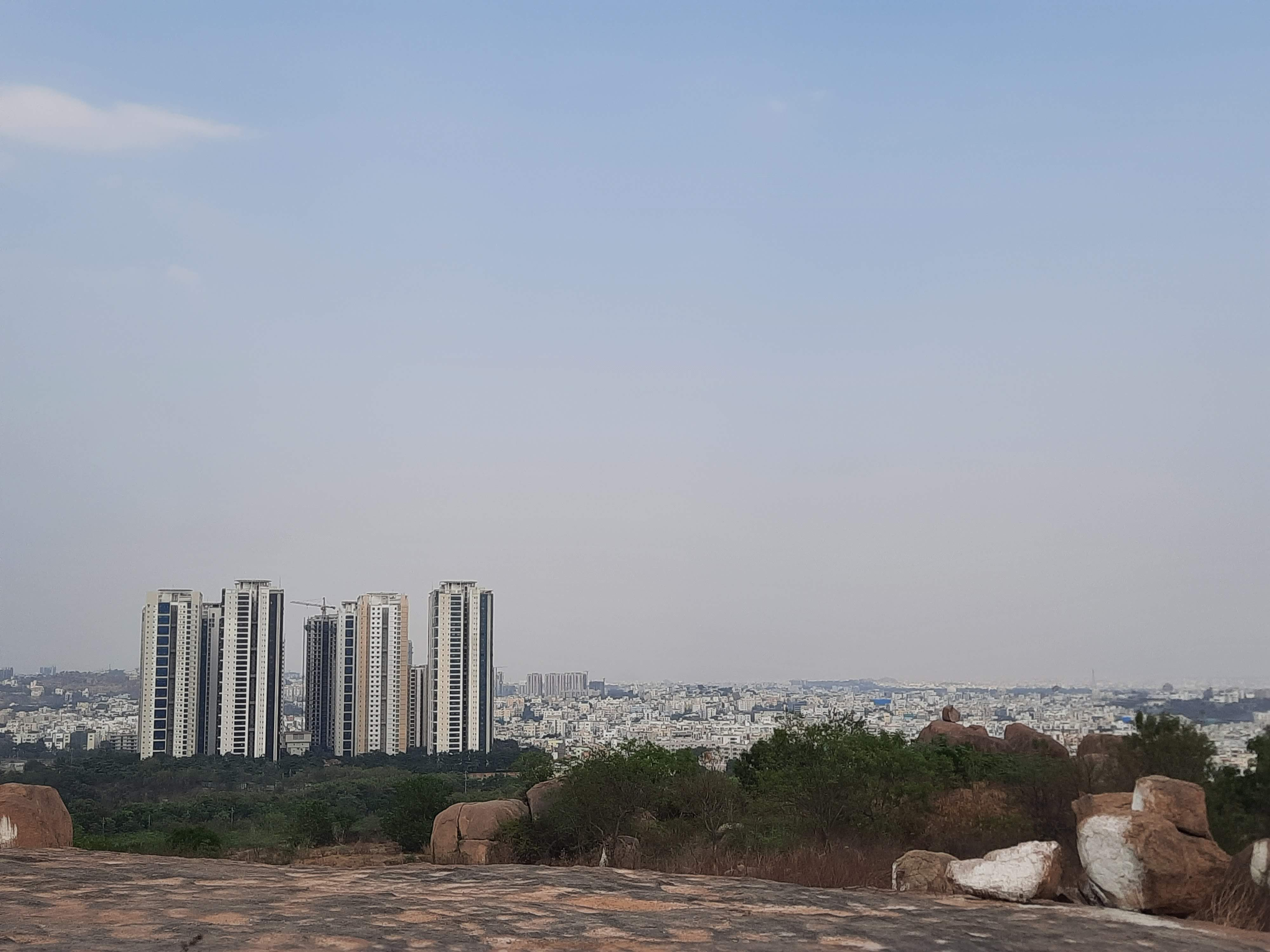

- Location in Hyderabad, Telangana, India Khajaguda (Telangana) Khajaguda (India)
- Country: India
- State: Telangana
- District: Ranga Reddy
- Metro: Hyderabad
- Named for: Khaja Shamsuddin

Government
  - Body: GHMC

Languages
  - Official: Telugu, English, Hindi
- Time zone: UTC+5:30 (IST)
- Postal code: 500008
- Vehicle registration: TG-07
- Planning agency: GHMC
- Website: telangana.gov.in

Khajaguda is a major commercial and residential area in Hyderabad, Telangana, in the suburb of Gachibowli. It is in the vicinity of Financial district, Gachibowli and HITEC City. Several residential apartments like Jains Carlton Creek, ASBL Lakeside, IT HEIGHTS, Niharika Interlake, Niharika Lakefront are situated in Khajaguda.

== Sights ==
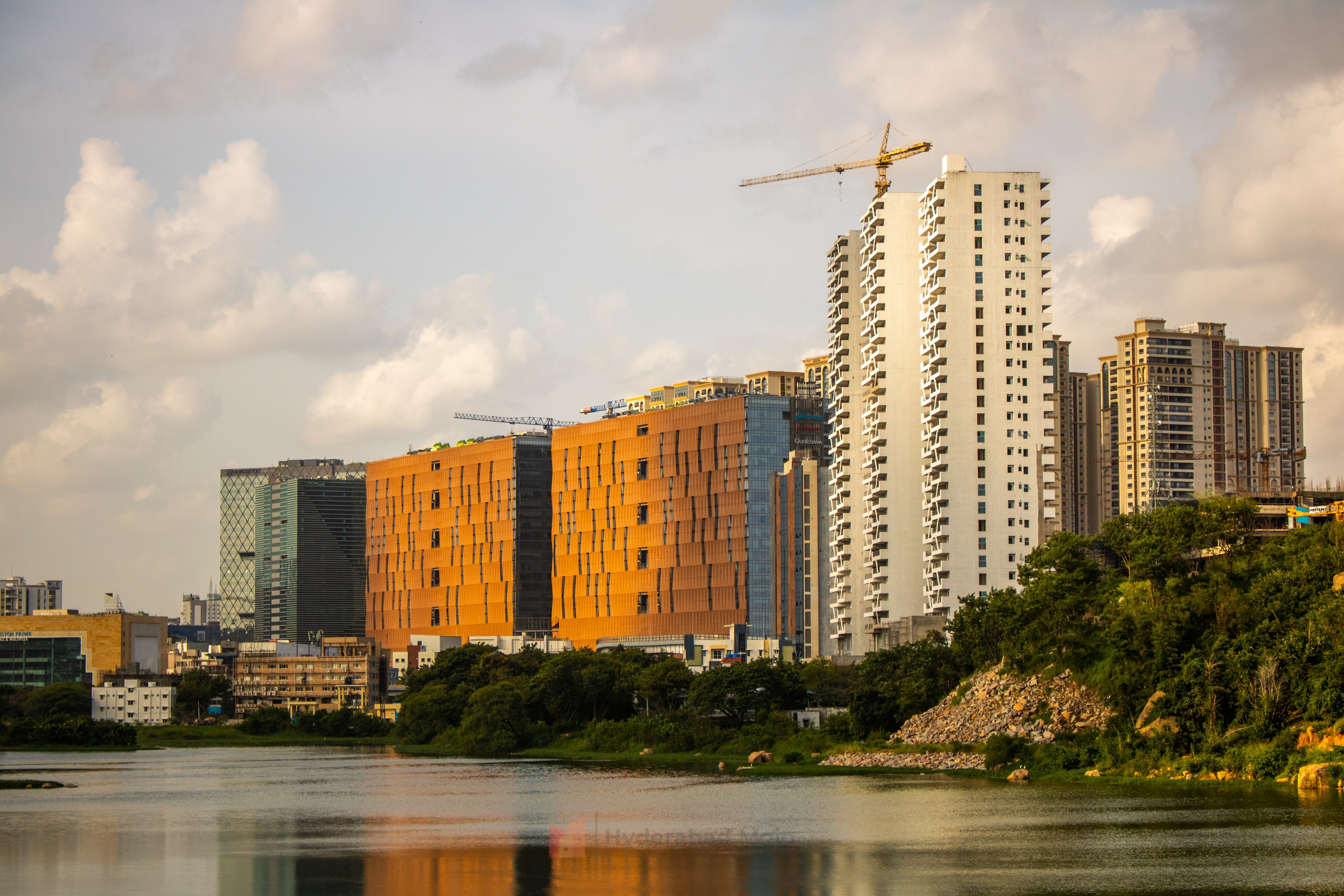
Khajaguda Talab

- Khajaguda Talab (Pedda Cheruvu) and its adjoining area is developed into a beautiful lakefront.
- Khajaguda Lake and the Khajaguda Hills (Fakhruddin Gutta) on its Southern shore, are a popular spot for outdoor activities, such as hiking and bouldering.
- SAS iTower, a high-rise commercial complex is situated on Khajaguda - Nanakramguda Road. At a height of 38 floors and 153.95 metres (505.1 ft), it is the tallest commercial building in South India. SAS iTower is also the largest skyscraper in the world by floor area and the fourth-largest office building in the world.
- Ramanaidu Studios, Chaitanya Enclave, Khajaguda
- Khajaguda Sports Complex (also known as GHMC Sports Complex) is spread over two acres and the complex is available under the Pay and Play initiative of the GHMC.

== Khajaguda Rock Formations ==
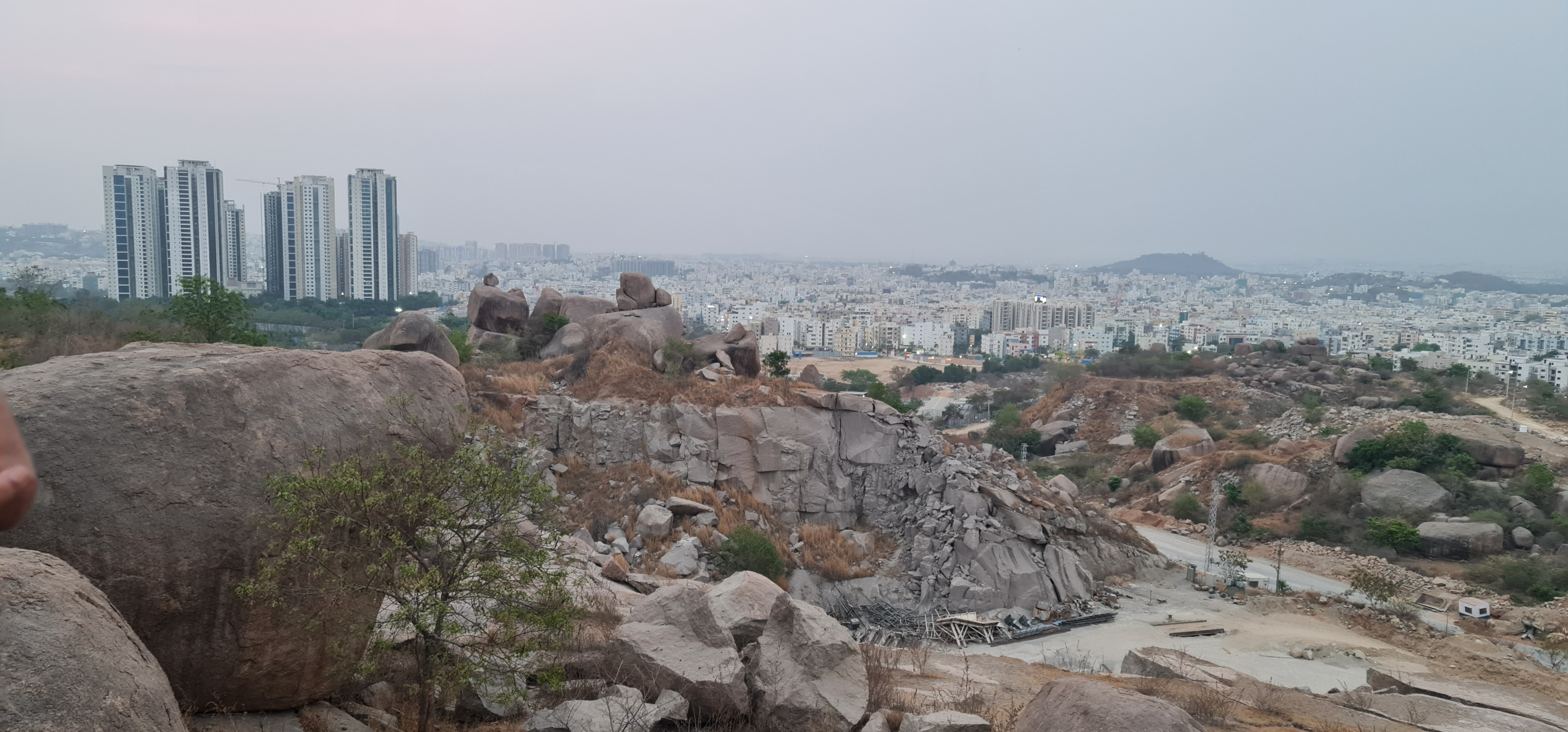
View from top of Khajaguda rocks

Khajaguda rock formation is spread across 180 acres in Nanakramguda and are reportedly around 4.4 billion years old, i.e. as old as the f Earth’s crust. These are one of the oldest forms of rocks, and are made of gneissic granite. Usually over a period of time, newer rocks are supposed to form over these tough base rocks. In Khajaguda, newer rocks did not form over these billion year old rocks and they remained exposed to atmosphere till date. These rock formations are being wiped out due to construction activities and encroachment.

== Schools ==
- Oakridge International School
- Delhi Public school, Khajaguda, Hyderabad

== Vicinity ==
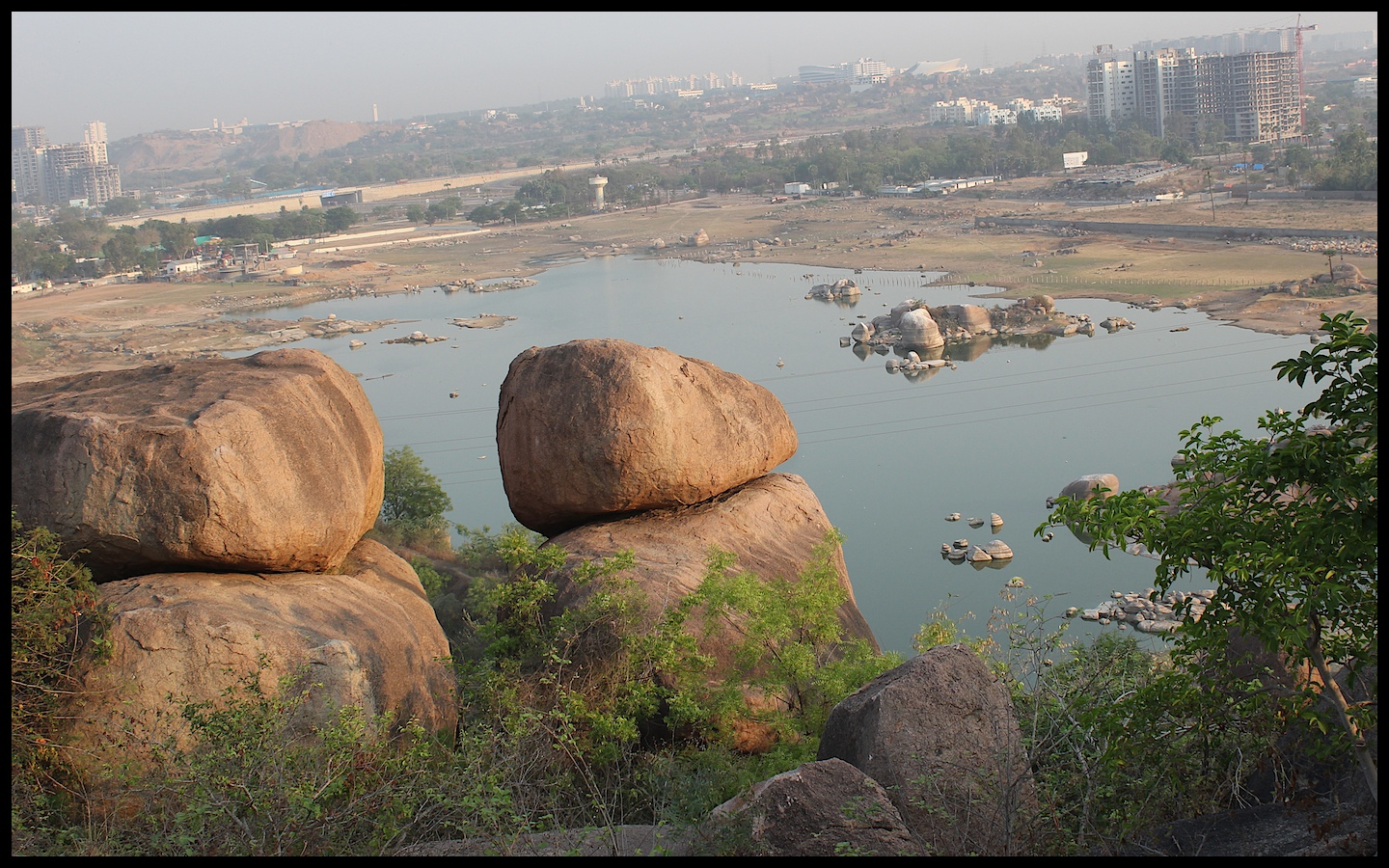
Khajaguda Hills (Fakhruddin Gutta)

The landmarks Near Khajaguda are Ananthaswamy hills (Boda gutta), Delhi public school, Raidurgam police station, Baskin robbins and MJR magnifique. There are few gigantic rock formations known as Khajaguda Hills (Fakhruddin Gutta). Fakhruddin Gutta heritage site (rock formation) is divided between Puppalguda and Khajaguda villages. Fakhruddin Gutta granite rock formations (popularly known as Khajaguda Hills) are as old as 2.5 billion years. Khajaguda Rock Formation, which is prehistoric heritage site, is spread across 180-acre (0.73 km^{2}). The tomb of Saint Hazrat Baba Fakhruddin Aulia — spiritual mentor of Ala-ud-Din Bahman Shah (founder of the Bahmani Kingdom) who was buried here in 1353 AD; an over 800-year-old Annatha Padmanabha Swamy Temple and a cave where the revered saint, Meher Baba had meditated are situated on Khajaguda Hills (Fakhruddin Gutta). In October 2023, Hyderabad Metropolitan Development Authority (HMDA) started work to fence the 2.5 billion-year-old Khajaguda rock formations and limiting access to motorists, visitors.

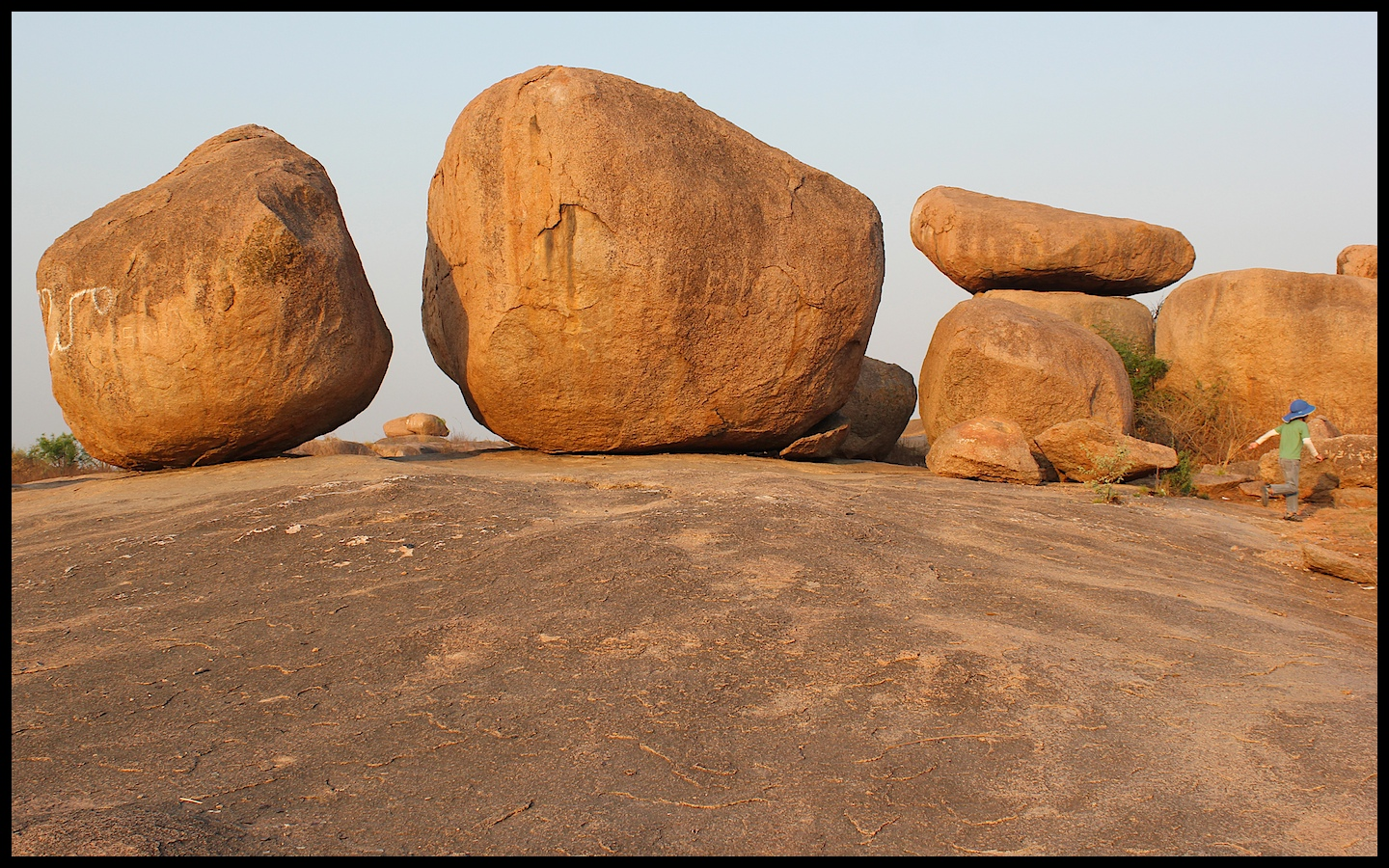
Rocks Fakhruddin Gutta Hyderabad

== Public transport ==
Hyderabad Airport Express Metro will pass through Khajaguda - Nanakramguda Road. Khajaguda is connected by buses run by TSRTC, since a HCU Bus Depot is close by, it is well connected.

== Link Roads ==
- 0.95 km Link Road connecting Old Mumbai Highway at ESCI with Khajaguda road near DPS.
- 2.20 km Link road from Khajaguda Lake to ORR, parallel to Urdu University compound wall and Oakridge International School.
- Outer Ring Road -Lanco Hills link road is under construction as part of Corridor 39B. This 3.89 km long link road is constructed alongside the Khajaguda Heritage Rock Formation.

== See also ==
- Gachibowli
- Manikonda
- Kokapet
- Society to Save Rocks
- Puppalaguda
