= List of tallest buildings in Hyderabad =

Tallest buildings in Hyderabad, India

Tall buildings in Hyderabad
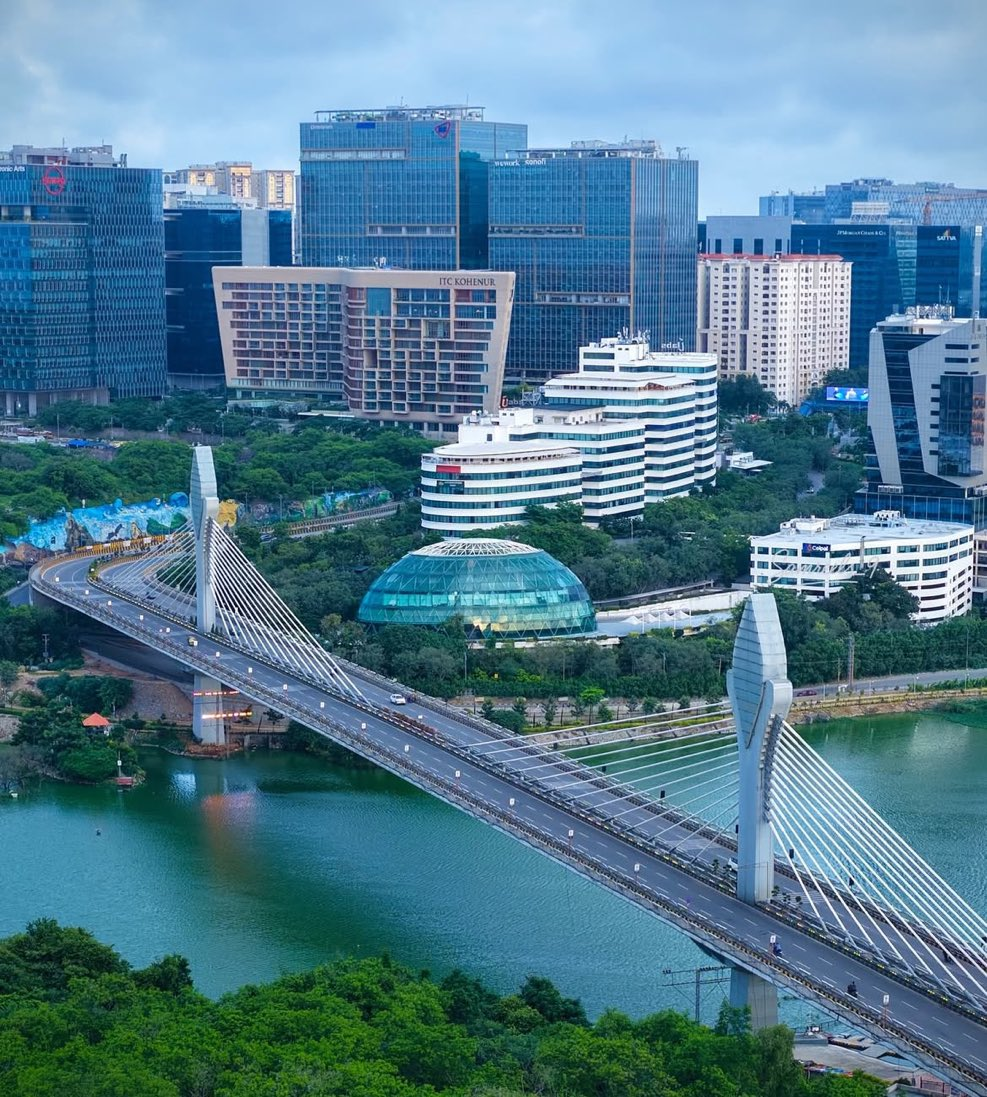
- Hyderabad's Knowledge City business district viewed from across the Durgam Cheruvu Bridge
- Tallest building: SAS Crown (2026)
- Tallest building height: 235.3 metres (772 ft)
- Major clusters: HITEC City; Financial District; Gachibowli; Kokapet
- First 150 m+ building: Lodha Bellezza (2014)

Number of tall buildings (2026)
- Taller than 100 m (328 ft): 191
- Taller than 150 m (492 ft): 21 + 50 T/O (Note: Topped-out)
- Taller than 200 m (656 ft): 3 + 2 T/O

Hyderabad, the capital of the Indian state of Telangana, has the highest number of skyscrapers and high-rise buildings in South India. Hyderabad has one of the largest skylines in South Asia, with 71 completed or topped out skyscrapers taller than 150 metres (492 ft). The three towers of SAS Crown are the tallest buildings in Hyderabad. Standing at 235.3 metres (772 ft) in height with 58 storeys, SAS Crown was the 24th tallest building in India, the second-tallest outside Mumbai, and the tallest in South India when it topped out in October 2024.

Most of Hyderabad's high-rise buildings are located in key business areas such as Gachibowli, Madhapur, HITEC City, Raidurg, Nanakramguda, Kondapur and Manikonda in the western regions of the city. Kukatpally, Nallagandla and Miyapur in the city's northwest also have numerous high-rise buildings. Additionally, large-scale real estate developments are emerging in the southwest regions in newly planned localities such as Neopolis, Kokapet and Gandipet.

The city has around 230 skyscrapers under construction, each with a minimum height of 150 metres (492 ft). The tallest of these is the Candeur Skyline project, which comprises four towers each reaching a height of 244 metres (801 ft).

== History ==
=== Early Developments (Pre–2000s) ===
Prior to the 21st century, Hyderabad's urban development was largely horizontal, with very few structures exceeding ten storeys. Babukhan Estate, which was completed in 1987, was the first high-rise building in Hyderabad. It stood 59 metres (194 ft) tall with 17 floors, with a mix of office spaces and retail shops. Babukhan Estate remained the tallest building in Hyderabad for the next 27 years until 2014. Over the next few decades, a few other notable high-rise buildings were constructed such as the Burgula Ramakrishna Rao Bhavan (1980s) in Khairatabad and the Swapnalok Complex (1987) in Secunderabad. However, restrictive zoning regulations coupled with low land cost and limited demand for high-density living meant that the city never had a need for tall buildings.

Number of completed high-rise buildings by height in Hyderabad at the end of each year. Topped out buildings are not included. Click on the legend to toggle a specific height on or off. View chart definition.

=== First Wave of High-Rises (2000s–2010s) ===
With the turn of the century, Hyderabad began to emerge as a major hub for IT services. New localities, such as HITEC City and Cyberabad, emerged in the early 2000s and witnessed the construction of mid-rise and high-rise office spaces. During this time, large-scale commercial and luxury residential high-rise projects started to become more common. Some of the notable projects from this period include Raheja Mindspace, Lanco Hills, Malaysian Township, and Lodha Bellezza. The early 2000s also witnessed the rise in popularity of gated residential communities in emerging neighbourhoods like Madhapur, Kondapur, and Gachibowli. Hyderabad got its first skyscrapers during this period with two towers of Lodha Bellezza rising to 153 metres (502 ft) each in 2014.

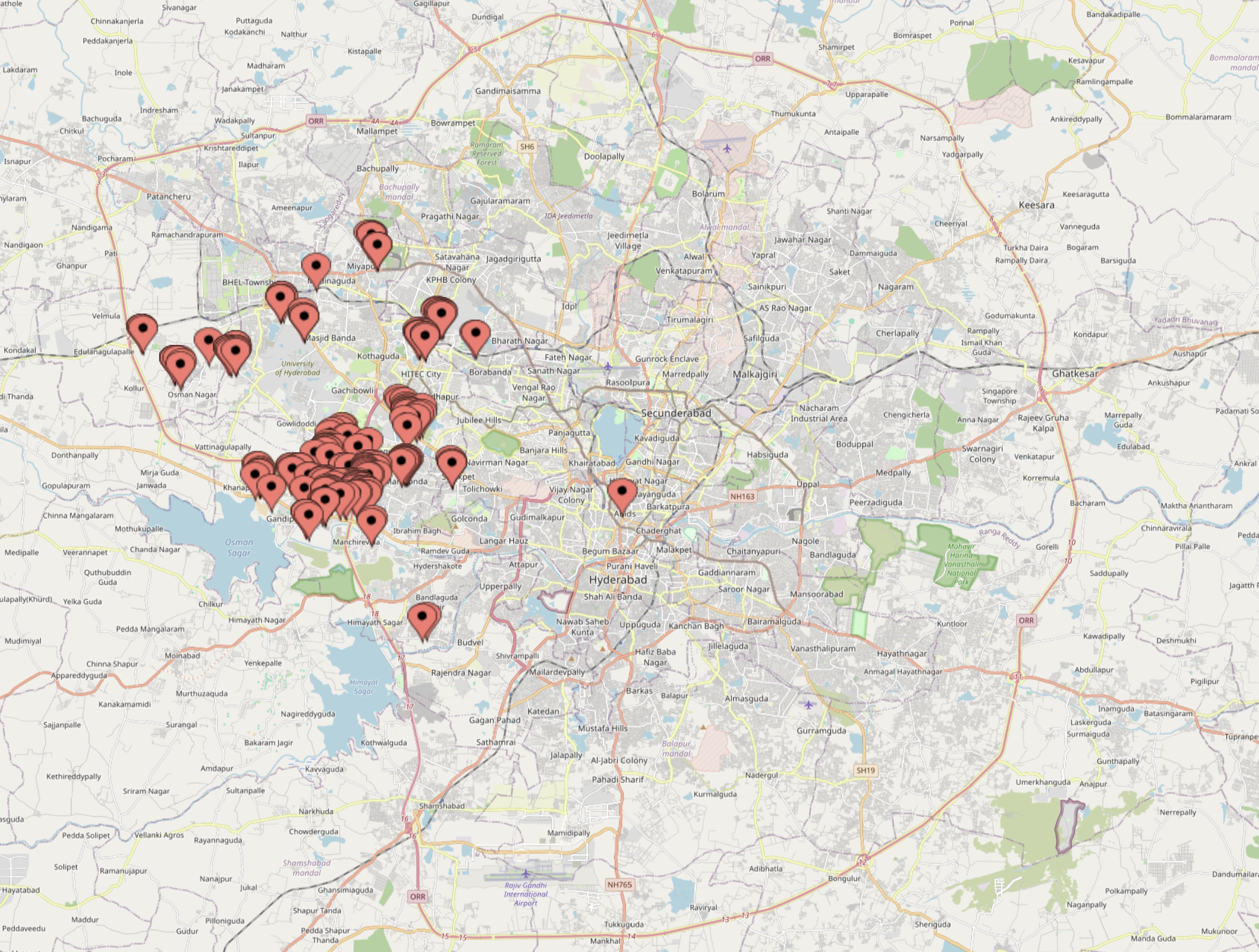
Map showing the distribution of buildings 100 metres (328 ft) or taller in Hyderabad as of 17 July 2025, highlighting the concentration of high-rise structures in the city's western corridor.

=== Policy Shifts and the Vertical Boom (Late 2010s–2020s) ===
In 2014, the state of Andhra Pradesh was bifurcated into two states – Telangana and Andhra Pradesh, with Hyderabad being geographically located in Telangana. The newly formed Government of Telangana relaxed floor space index (FSI) norms and provided faster approvals for new projects with the goal of spurring growth in the newly formed state. Developmental reforms such as the Telangana Building Permission Approval and Self-Certification System (TS-bPASS) coupled with an influx of real estate investments led to the announcement of several new high-rise projects. Between the late 2010s and early 2020s, Hyderabad witnessed a rapid construction boom, particularly around its IT corridor in the west. This was fuelled by an increase of foreign investment from global technology firms and a rapidly growing upper-middle-class population.

In the early 2020s, major developers like My Home Group, SAS Infra, Auro Realty, and RMZ launched large-scale residential and commercial skyscrapers in areas such as HITEC City, Kokapet, Nanakramguda, and Puppalaguda. The completion of SAS Crown in 2026 marked Hyderabad's entry into the 200m+ skyscraper league. Residential high-rise gated communities with 40–50 floors became increasingly popular. SAS iTower, with 5.2 million square feet of floor space, was completed in 2025 and became the fourth-largest office building in the world. The developments during this period, after the formation of Telangana, led to the rapid growth of Hyderabad into a city of global prominence.

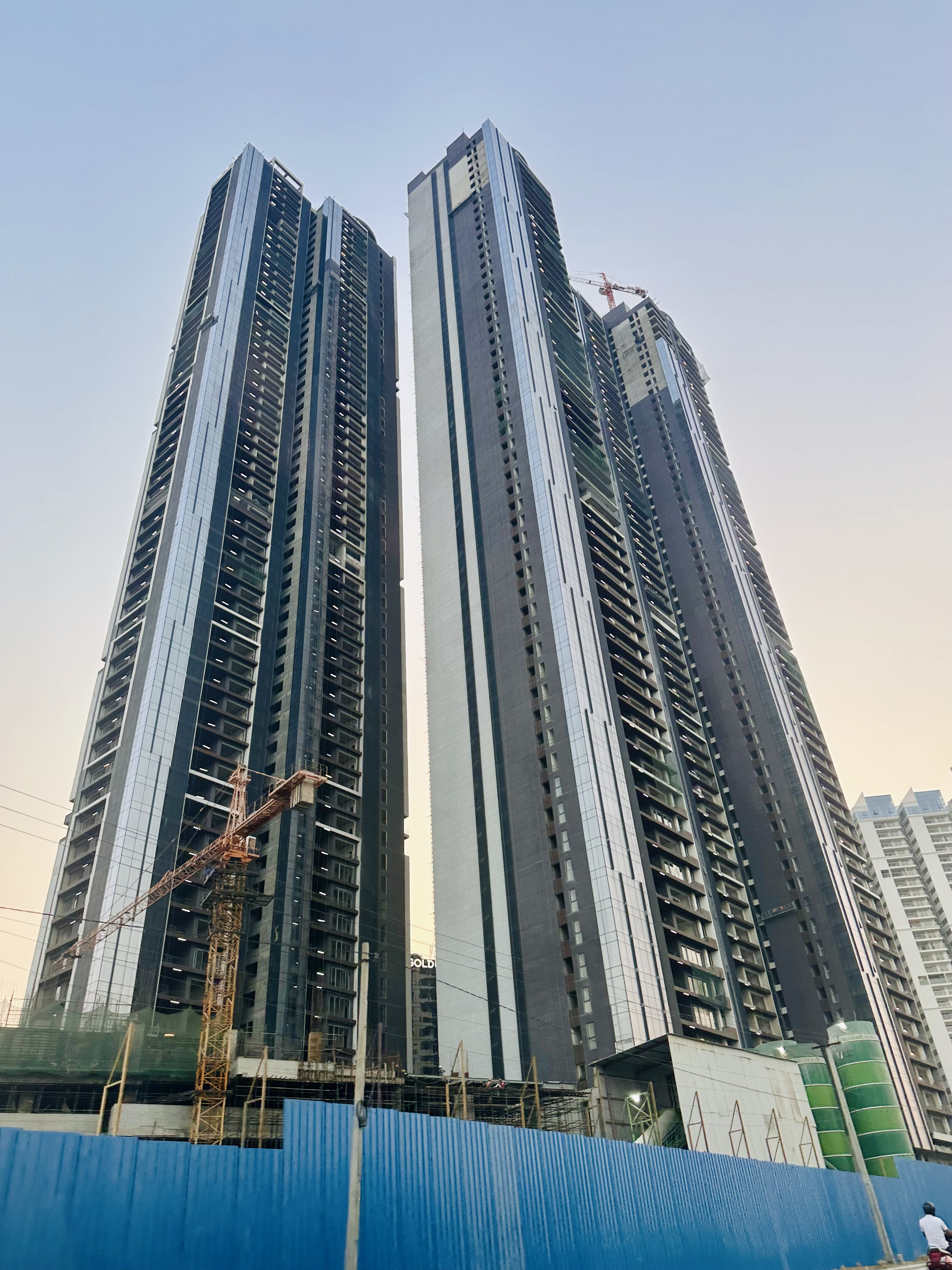
The three towers of SAS Crown are currently the tallest buildings in Hyderabad and South India.

=== Ongoing and Future Trends ===
As of 2026, Hyderabad has the second-highest number of skyscrapers in India, behind only Mumbai, and continues to witness a robust pipeline of new high-rise projects. The city has several buildings over 50 floors under construction, which includes both office spaces and luxury residences. Infrastructure projects such as the Hyderabad Metro expansion, Outer Ring Road (ORR), and the Strategic Road Development Programme (SRDP) are expected to further enhance connectivity and make newer localities on the periphery of the city more accessible.

Architecturally, the city's skyline consists of a mix of concrete buildings along with glass-and-steel structures. Glass-clad exteriors tend to be more common among office buildings. Due to the tropical climate, most of the city's residential buildings avoid excessive use of glass facades to minimize the greenhouse effect. Newer projects also have an emphasis on sustainability and smart building technologies such as energy-efficient facades, rainwater harvesting, and green rooftops.

Over the next decade, Kokapet, Neopolis, and the Financial District are projected to house several of the tallest buildings in South India. The city's skyline continues to evolve rapidly, marking Hyderabad's transformation into a major urban and economic hub in South Asia.

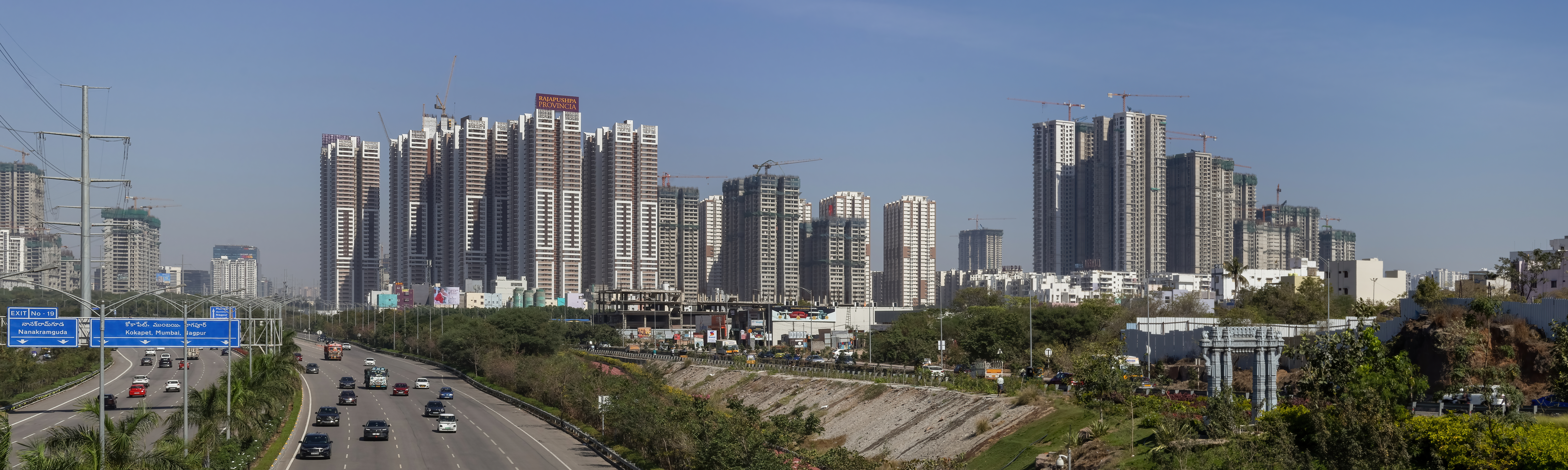
Panoramic view of the Kokapet skyline along the Hyderabad Outer Ring Road, taken in January 2025.

== Cityscape ==
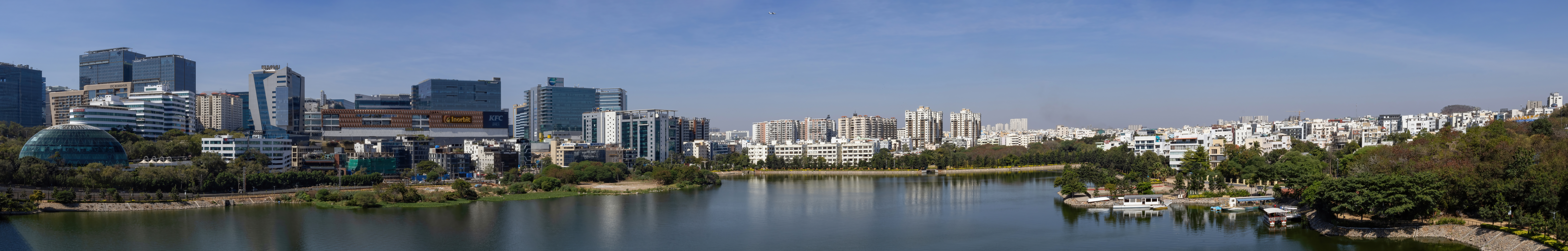
Panoramic view of the business districts of HITEC City and Madhapur, taken from the Durgam Cheruvu Bridge.

== Map of tallest buildings ==
The map below shows the location of every building taller than 150 metres (492 ft) in Hyderabad. Blue markers represent residential buildings whereas red markers represent commercial buildings.

Buildings taller than 150 metres (492 ft) in Hyderabad
- Residential
- Commercial
1 SAS Crown Tower 1
2 SAS Crown Tower 2
3 SAS Crown Tower 3
4 Diamond Tower Block C
5 DSR The Twins Tower A
6 DSR The Twins Tower B
7 The Trilight Tower 3 (Rigel)
8 Phoenix Triton
9 The Trilight Tower 2 (Vega)
10 Candeur Lakescape Tower A
11 Candeur Lakescape Tower B
12 Candeur Lakescape Tower C
13 Candeur Lakescape Tower D
14 Candeur Lakescape Tower E
15 Candeur Lakescape Tower F
16 Candeur Lakescape Tower G
17 Candeur Crescent Tower A
18 Candeur Crescent Tower B
19 Candeur Crescent Tower C
20 Candeur Crescent Tower D
21 Candeur Crescent Tower E
22 My Home Avali Tower 1
23 My Home Avali Tower 2
24 Grava Business Park Tower 1
25 DSR Skymarq Block E
26 DSR Skymarq Block C
27 SAS iTower A
28 Sumadhura Olympus Tower A
29 Sumadhura Olympus Tower B
30 Lodha Bellezza Tower 3
31 Lodha Bellezza Tower 4
32 My Home Nishada Tower 1
33 My Home Nishada Tower 2
34 My Home Nishada Tower 3
35 My Home Nishada Tower 4
36 My Home Nishada Tower 5
37 My Home Nishada Tower 6
38 My Home Nishada Tower 7
39 My Home Nishada Tower 8
40 My Home Vipina Tower 1
41 My Home Vipina Tower 2
42 My Home Vipina Tower 3
43 My Home Vipina Tower 4
44 My Home Vipina Tower 5
45 My Home Vipina Tower 6
46 My Home Vipina Tower 7
47 My Home Vipina Tower 8
48 ASBL Loft Tower A
49 ASBL Loft Tower B

== Tallest buildings ==
This lists ranks the tallest completed and topped out buildings in Hyderabad that are at least 150 metres (492 ft) in height based on standard height measurements. This includes spires and architectural details but does not include antenna masts. The "Year" column indicates the year in which a building was completed (or the expected year of completion for buildings which have topped out but not yet completed).

Was the tallest building in Hyderabad upon completion
Architecturally topped out but not yet completed

Rank	Name	Location	Image	Height	Floors	Year	Building type	Notes
1	SAS Crown Tower 1	Kokapet 17°24′06″N 78°20′20″E	Tall residential building complex with three towers.	235.3 metres (772 ft)	58	2026	Residential	Tallest building and building with the most floors in Hyderabad and South India since it topped out in October 2024.; First building in Hyderabad and South India to cross 200 metres.; SAS Crown Tower 2 is the thinnest skyscraper in South India, with a slenderness ratio (height-to-width ratio) of 8.1.
1	SAS Crown Tower 2	Kokapet 17°24′05″N 78°20′22″E	Tall residential building complex with three towers.	235.3 metres (772 ft)	58	2026	Residential	Tallest building and building with the most floors in Hyderabad and South India since it topped out in October 2024.; First building in Hyderabad and South India to cross 200 metres.; SAS Crown Tower 2 is the thinnest skyscraper in South India, with a slenderness ratio (height-to-width ratio) of 8.1.
1	SAS Crown Tower 3	Kokapet 17°24′03″N 78°20′22″E	Tall residential building with a glass facade.	235.3 metres (772 ft)	58	2026	Residential	Tallest building and building with the most floors in Hyderabad and South India since it topped out in October 2024.; First building in Hyderabad and South India to cross 200 metres.; SAS Crown Tower 2 is the thinnest skyscraper in South India, with a slenderness ratio (height-to-width ratio) of 8.1.
4	The Trilight Tower 1 (Canopus)	Kokapet 17°24′03.5″N 78°19′59.7″E		202.45 metres (664 ft)	57	2028	Residential	
5	Myscape Yoo Residences	Financial District 17°24′46.1″N 78°20′20.2″E		201.1 metres (660 ft)	59	2027	Residential	
6	Diamond Tower Block C	Financial District 17°24′20″N 78°21′05.6″E		187.35 metres (615 ft)	55	2026	Residential	Tallest residential building (topped-out) within the Hyderabad Outer Ring Road.
7	Raghava Iris Tower 1	Raidurg 17°25′16.0″N 78°23′00.0″E		184.08 metres (604 ft)	47	2028	Residential	
8	Raghava Iris Tower 2	Raidurg 17°25′14.2″N 78°23′02.5″E		182.9 metres (600 ft)	47	2028	Residential	
9	Meenakshi Elan Tower A	Puppalaguda 17°24′30.6″N 78°21′19.8″E		182.85 metres (600 ft)	46	2028	Residential	
9	Meenakshi Elan Tower B	Puppalaguda 17°24′32.5″N 78°21′19.6″E		182.85 metres (600 ft)	46	2028	Residential	
9	Meenakshi Elan Tower C	Puppalaguda 17°24′31.9″N 78°21′22.0″E		182.85 metres (600 ft)	46	2028	Residential	
12	Raghava Iris Tower 3	Raidurg 17°25′12.6″N 78°22′59.8″E		182.6 metres (599 ft)	47	2028	Residential	
13	DSR The Twins Tower A	Financial District 17°24′15.4″N 78°21′09.1″E		181.675 metres (596 ft)	44	2027	Residential	Topped out in January 2026.
13	DSR The Twins Tower B	Financial District 17°24′13.3″N 78°21′08.5″E		181.675 metres (596 ft)	44	2027	Residential	Topped out in January 2026.
15	The Trilight Tower 3 (Rigel)	Kokapet 17°24′01.9″N 78°20′02.8″E		178.3 metres (585 ft)	50	2027	Residential	Topped out in Dec 2025.; Height of the topmost floor is 175.85 metres (577 ft).
16	Phoenix Triton	Khajaguda 17°24′03″N 78°21′16″E		175.1 metres (574 ft)	42	2026	Commercial	Tallest commercial building in Hyderabad and South India since 2025.; Fourteenth-tallest office building in India at the time of topping out in 2025.
17	The Trilight Tower 2 (Vega)	Kokapet 17°24′02.3″N 78°20′01.0″E		170 metres (558 ft)	47	2027	Residential	Topped out in Dec 2025.; Height of the topmost floor is 165.5 metres (543 ft).
18	Candeur Lakescape Tower A	Spring Valley 17°28′42.0″N 78°20′06.4″E		166.8 metres (547 ft)	48	2027	Residential	Topped out in Sep 2025.; Height of the topmost floor is 159.6 metres (524 ft).
18	Candeur Lakescape Tower B	Spring Valley 17°28′41.5″N 78°20′08.3″E		166.8 metres (547 ft)	48	2027	Residential	Topped out in Sep 2025.; Height of the topmost floor is 159.6 metres (524 ft).
18	Candeur Lakescape Tower C	Spring Valley 17°28′41.1″N 78°20′09.8″E		166.8 metres (547 ft)	48	2027	Residential	Topped out in Sep 2025.; Height of the topmost floor is 159.6 metres (524 ft).
18	Candeur Lakescape Tower D	Spring Valley 17°28′40.6″N 78°20′11.7″E		166.8 metres (547 ft)	48	2027	Residential	Topped out in Sep 2025.; Height of the topmost floor is 159.6 metres (524 ft).
18	Candeur Lakescape Tower E	Spring Valley 17°28′42.1″N 78°20′12.3″E		166.8 metres (547 ft)	48	2027	Residential	Topped out in Mar 2026.
18	Candeur Lakescape Tower F	Spring Valley 17°28′42.5″N 78°20′10.3″E		166.8 metres (547 ft)	48	2027	Residential	Topped out in Dec 2025.
18	Candeur Lakescape Tower G	Spring Valley 17°28′43.3″N 78°20′09.0″E		166.8 metres (547 ft)	48	2027	Residential	Topped out in Dec 2025.
25	Candeur Crescent Tower A	Serilingampally 17°28′51″N 78°19′11″E	A skyscraper with a white painted exterior.	166 metres (545 ft)	50	2026	Residential	Tallest completed residential building within the Hyderabad Outer Ring Road since 2025.
25	Candeur Crescent Tower B	Serilingampally 17°28′53″N 78°19′11″E	A skyscraper with a white painted exterior.	166 metres (545 ft)	50	2026	Residential	Tallest completed residential building within the Hyderabad Outer Ring Road since 2025.
25	Candeur Crescent Tower C	Serilingampally 17°28′52″N 78°19′09″E	Three towers of a residential skyscraper complex.	166 metres (545 ft)	50	2026	Residential	Tallest completed residential building within the Hyderabad Outer Ring Road since 2025.
25	Candeur Crescent Tower D	Serilingampally 17°28′51″N 78°19′07.5″E	Three towers of a residential skyscraper complex.	166 metres (545 ft)	50	2026	Residential	Tallest completed residential building within the Hyderabad Outer Ring Road since 2025.
25	Candeur Crescent Tower E	Serilingampally 17°28′53″N 78°19′08″E	Three towers of a residential skyscraper complex.	166 metres (545 ft)	50	2026	Residential	Tallest completed residential building within the Hyderabad Outer Ring Road since 2025.
30	Raichandani Eka One	Kokapet		164.55 metres (540 ft)	42	2028	Residential	
31	My Home Avali Tower 1	Tellapur 17°27′40.3″N 78°17′35.9″E		158.55 metres (520 ft)	47	2027	Residential	
31	My Home Avali Tower 2	Tellapur 17°27′42.3″N 78°17′35.5″E		158.55 metres (520 ft)	47	2027	Residential	
31	My Home Avali Tower 3	Tellapur 17°27′43.0″N 78°17′33.0″E		158.55 metres (520 ft)	47	2027	Residential	
31	My Home Avali Tower 4	Tellapur 17°27′45.0″N 78°17′33.4″E		158.55 metres (520 ft)	47	2027	Residential	
35	Grava Business Park Tower 1	Neopolis 17°23′54″N 78°18′54″E	An under-construction office building with a glass facade.	156 metres (512 ft)	36	2026	Commercial	Tallest precast building in India.; Tallest commercial building outside the Hyderabad Outer Ring Road.
36	My Home Apas Tower 1	Kokapet 17°24′12.5″N 78°19′39.2″E		154.95 metres (508 ft)	45	2028	Residential	
36	My Home Apas Tower 2	Kokapet 17°24′09.1″N 78°19′41.7″E		154.95 metres (508 ft)	45	2028	Residential	
36	My Home Apas Tower 3	Kokapet 17°24′07.6″N 78°19′43.6″E		154.95 metres (508 ft)	45	2028	Residential	
39	My Home Nishada Tower 1	Neopolis 17°24′17″N 78°18′26.5″E	Residential skyscraper complex with a white and beige exterior.	154.5 metres (507 ft)	45	2026	Residential	
39	My Home Nishada Tower 2	Neopolis 17°24′17″N 78°18′30″E	Residential skyscraper complex with a white and beige exterior.	154.5 metres (507 ft)	45	2026	Residential	
39	My Home Nishada Tower 3	Neopolis 17°24′16″N 78°18′32″E	Residential skyscraper complex with a white and beige exterior.	154.5 metres (507 ft)	45	2026	Residential	
39	My Home Nishada Tower 4	Neopolis 17°24′19″N 78°18′27″E	Residential skyscraper complex with a white and beige exterior.	154.5 metres (507 ft)	45	2026	Residential	
39	My Home Nishada Tower 5	Neopolis 17°24′19″N 78°18′32.2″E	Residential skyscraper complex with a white and beige exterior.	154.5 metres (507 ft)	45	2026	Residential	
39	My Home Nishada Tower 6	Neopolis 17°24′22″N 78°18′27″E	Residential skyscraper complex with a white and beige exterior.	154.5 metres (507 ft)	45	2026	Residential	
39	My Home Nishada Tower 7	Neopolis 17°24′21″N 78°18′30″E	Residential skyscraper complex with a white and beige exterior.	154.5 metres (507 ft)	45	2026	Residential	
39	My Home Nishada Tower 8	Neopolis 17°24′21″N 78°18′34″E	Residential skyscraper complex with a white and beige exterior.	154.5 metres (507 ft)	45	2026	Residential	
47	DSR Skymarq Block E	Financial District 17°24′16.5″N 78°21′04.4″E		154.01 metres (505 ft)	43	2027	Residential	Topped out in November 2025.
48	DSR Skymarq Block C	Financial District 17°24′13.1″N 78°21′05.9″E		154.01 metres (505 ft)	41	2027	Residential	Topped out in November 2025.
49	DSR Skymarq Block D	Financial District 17°24′14.2″N 78°21′04.2″E		154.01 metres (505 ft)	41	2028	Residential	Topped out in October 2026.
49	DSR Skymarq Block F	Financial District 17°24′15.7″N 78°21′06.4″E		154.01 metres (505 ft)	41	2028	Residential	Topped out in October 2026.
51	SAS iTower A1	Khajaguda 17°25′09″N 78°21′34″E	A large office building with a bluish-green glass facade.	153.95 metres (505 ft)	37	2026	Commercial	Fourth-largest office building in the world by floor area (5.2 million sq.ft.) and largest in Hyderabad.; Largest skyscraper in the world by floor area.; Was the tallest building in Hyderabad when it topped out in 2024, before being surpassed by SAS Crown which topped out later the same year.; First commercial building in Hyderabad to cross 150 metres.
52	Sumadhura Olympus Tower A	Financial District 17°25′10.7″N 78°20′56.8″E	A residential skyscraper complex with a white painted exterior.	153.3 metres (503 ft)	45	2025	Residential	Tallest twin towers in Hyderabad since 2025.; The height of the topmost liveable floor is 146.42 metres (480 ft). The total structural height of 153.3 metres (503 ft) is estimated based on the building's elevation.
52	Sumadhura Olympus Tower B	Financial District 17°25′10.3″N 78°20′59.4″E	A residential skyscraper complex with a white painted exterior.	153.3 metres (503 ft)	45	2025	Residential	Tallest twin towers in Hyderabad since 2025.; The height of the topmost liveable floor is 146.42 metres (480 ft). The total structural height of 153.3 metres (503 ft) is estimated based on the building's elevation.
54	Lodha Bellezza Tower 3	Kukatpally 17°28′30″N 78°23′33.6″E	A residential skyscraper complex with three towers.	153 metres (502 ft)	45	2014	Residential	Were the tallest buildings in Hyderabad from 2014 to 2024.; First buildings to cross 150 metres.; Tallest buildings completed in the 2010s.
54	Lodha Bellezza Tower 4	Kukatpally 17°28′29″N 78°23′35″E	A residential skyscraper complex with three towers.	153 metres (502 ft)	45	2014	Residential	Were the tallest buildings in Hyderabad from 2014 to 2024.; First buildings to cross 150 metres.; Tallest buildings completed in the 2010s.
56	NSL East Luxoria Tower A	Uppal Kalan 17°24′10.4″N 78°32′52.3″E		152.37 metres (500 ft)	45	2029	Residential	
56	NSL East Luxoria Tower B	Uppal Kalan 17°24′10.1″N 78°32′54.9″E		152.37 metres (500 ft)	45	2029	Residential	
58	Sattva Lakeridge Tower 1	Neopolis 17°24′14.0″N 78°18′43.1″E		152 metres (499 ft)	38	2028	Residential	
58	Sattva Lakeridge Tower 2	Neopolis 17°24′15.8″N 78°18′43.3″E		152 metres (499 ft)	38	2028	Residential	
58	Sattva Lakeridge Tower 3	Neopolis 17°24′17.7″N 78°18′43.4″E		152 metres (499 ft)	38	2028	Residential	
58	Sattva Lakeridge Tower 6	Neopolis 17°24′15.0″N 78°18′47.8″E		152 metres (499 ft)	38	2028	Residential	
62	My Home Vipina Tower 1	Tellapur 17°28′07.2″N 78°15′19.7″E		151 metres (495 ft)	47	2027	Residential	Topped out in 2025.
62	My Home Vipina Tower 2	Tellapur 17°28′10.4″N 78°15′19.7″E		151 metres (495 ft)	47	2027	Residential	Topped out in 2025.
62	My Home Vipina Tower 3	Tellapur 17°28′06.8″N 78°15′22.1″E		151 metres (495 ft)	47	2027	Residential	Topped out in 2025.
62	My Home Vipina Tower 4	Tellapur 17°28′10.8″N 78°15′22.1″E		151 metres (495 ft)	47	2027	Residential	Topped out in 2025.
62	My Home Vipina Tower 5	Tellapur 17°28′10.2″N 78°15′24.2″E		151 metres (495 ft)	47	2027	Residential	Topped out in 2025.
62	My Home Vipina Tower 6	Tellapur 17°28′04.5″N 78°15′26.6″E		151 metres (495 ft)	47	2027	Residential	Topped out in 2025.
62	My Home Vipina Tower 7	Tellapur 17°28′07.8″N 78°15′26.6″E		151 metres (495 ft)	47	2027	Residential	Topped out in 2025.
62	My Home Vipina Tower 8	Tellapur 17°28′10.9″N 78°15′26.6″E		151 metres (495 ft)	47	2027	Residential	Topped out in 2025.
70	ASBL Loft Tower A	Financial District 17°24′25.5″N 78°20′29.3″E		150.35 metres (493 ft)	46	2029	Residential	Topped out in January 2026.
70	ASBL Loft Tower B	Financial District 17°24′22.1″N 78°20′30.4″E		150 metres (492 ft)	46	2029	Residential	Topped out in January 2026.

== Tallest under construction ==
Hyderabad has 224 skyscrapers under construction, each with a minimum height of 150 metres (492 ft). Buildings that are only approved or proposed are not included in this table.

Total number of skyscrapers under construction: 224

S.No.	Name	Location	Floors * No. of Towers	Height	Year	Building Type
1	Candeur Skyline	Nanakramguda	59 floors * 4 Towers	244.30 metres (802 ft)	2029	Residential
2	Skyven	Kokapet	63 floors	239.90 metres (787 ft)	2030	Residential
3	Navanaami One	Kokapet	64 floors	235.6 metres (773 ft)	2030	Residential
4	Sree Varaaha Aurum Tower A	Financial District	56 floors	229.7 metres (754 ft)	2031	Residential
5	Sree Varaaha Aurum Tower B	Financial District	56 floors	228.2 metres (749 ft)	2031	Residential
6	Lansum Encanto	Puppalaguda	61 floors * 3 Towers	223.9 metres (735 ft)	2029	Residential
7	My Home 99	Kokapet	54 floors	223.00 metres (732 ft)	2028	Residential
8	Sree Varaaha Aurum Tower C	Financial District	56 floors	221.6 metres (727 ft)	2031	Residential
9	Sree Varaaha Aurum Tower D	Financial District	56 floors	221.6 metres (727 ft)	2031	Residential
10	One by MSN	Kokapet	57 floors * 5 Towers	220.83 metres (725 ft)	2030	Residential
11	Raghava Nova	Financial District	65 floors * 2 Towers	220.8 metres (724 ft)	2030	Residential
12	Raghava Linq	Kokapet	61 floors * 4 Towers	219.55 metres (720 ft)	2031	Residential
13	The Cascades Neopolis	Neopolis	59 floors * 5 Towers	217.8 metres (715 ft)	2030	Residential
14	APR Olympia	Neopolis	57 floors	217.76 metres (714 ft)	2031	Residential
15	Rajapushpa Casa Luxura Towers B, C	Neopolis	56 floors * 2 Towers	214.5 metres (704 ft)	2029	Residential
16	Brigade Gateway	Neopolis	58 floors * 2 Towers	211.95 metres (695 ft)	2029	Residential
17	My Home Grava Residences Tower 1	Kokapet	55 floors	211.9 metres (695 ft)	2028	Residential
18	Poulomi Pallazzo	Kokapet	55 floors	211.2 metres (693 ft)	2028	Residential
19	Rajapushpa Casa Luxura Tower D	Neopolis	55 floors	211 metres (692 ft)	2029	Residential
20	Sumadhura Palais Royale Tower 1	Nanakramguda	54 floors	211 metres (692 ft)	2030	Residential
21	Pavani Mirai	Puppalaguda	51 floors	211 metres (692 ft)	2028	Residential
22	Yula Globus Neo Tower B	Neopolis	59 floors	210.05 metres (689 ft)	2030	Residential
23	Yula Globus Neo Tower A	Neopolis	59 floors	209.75 metres (688 ft)	2030	Residential
24	Rajapushpa Infina	Manchirevula	56 floors * 6 Towers	208.2 metres (683 ft)	2028	Residential
25	Myscape Two One Two	Financial District	54 floors	207.4 metres (680 ft)	2030	Residential
26	Rajapushpa Casa Luxura Towers A, E	Neopolis	54 floors * 2 Towers	206.5 metres (677 ft)	2029	Residential
27	The Marquise Tower 3	Kokapet	52 floors	205.2 metres (673 ft)	2028	Residential
28	Brigade World Trade Center	Neopolis	50 floors	204.45 metres (671 ft)	2029	Commercial
29	Diamond Tower Block A	Puppalaguda	48 floors	204.45 metres (671 ft)	2028	Commercial
30	Sattva Lago Precinct 2	Neopolis	53 floors * 2 Towers	204.23 metres (670 ft)	2030	Residential
31	Rajapushpa Aurelia	Tellapur	57 floors * 7 Towers	203.85 metres (669 ft)	2028	Residential
32	Rajapushpa Skyra	Neopolis	57 floors * 3 Towers	203.4 metres (667 ft)	2030	Residential
33	Raghava Cinq	Financial District	63 floors * 5 Towers	202.75 metres (665 ft)	2031	Residential
34	Lansum Elena	Kokapet	59 floors * 2 Towers	201.64 metres (662 ft)	2028	Residential
35	Manhattan by Vamsiram	Khajaguda	50 floors * 8 Towers	197.9 metres (649 ft)	2029	Residential
36	Sattva Lago Precinct 1	Neopolis	51 floors * 5 Towers	197.8 metres (649 ft)	2030	Residential
37	Sumadhura Palais Royale Tower 2	Puppalaguda	50 floors	197 metres (646 ft)	2030	Residential
38	Aparna Sarovar Towers	Nallagandla Lake	56 floors * 3 Towers	196.5 metres (645 ft)	2028	Residential
39	Amaris by Kurra Infra	Financial District	51 floors * 2 Towers	195.6 metres (642 ft)	2030	Residential
40	Navanaami Megaleio	Puppalaguda	54 floors * 2 Towers	195.4 metres (641 ft)	2028	Residential
41	My Home Vyoma Tower 12	Financial District	51 floors	194.6 metres (638 ft)	2031	Residential
42	Jayabheri The Pinnacle	Kokapet	56 floors * 2 Towers	192.95 metres (633 ft)	2028	Residential
43	Hallmark Altus Tower A	Kondapur	52 floors	192.3 metres (631 ft)	2028	Residential
44	Aparna Aqua	Chitrapuri Colony	56 floors * 3 Towers	192.5 metres (632 ft)	2028	Residential
45	Rise with 9 Tower 2	Neopolis	55 floors	191 metres (627 ft)	2029	Residential
46	SDG Prinia	Kismatpur	52 floors * 2 Towers	186.3 metres (611 ft)	2030	Residential
47	Raghava Halo	Serilingampally	57 floors * 3 Towers	184.7 metres (606 ft)	2030	Residential
48	My Home Vyoma Towers 1–11	Financial District	51 floors * 11 Towers	184.55 metres (605.5 ft)	2031	Residential
49	Rise with 9 Tower 1	Neopolis	53 floors	184.2 metres (604 ft)	2029	Residential
50	The Marquise Towers 1,2	Kokapet	48 floors * 2 Towers	183.38 metres (602 ft)	2028	Residential
51	Sumadhura Palais Royale Tower 3	Puppalaguda	50 floors	182.9 metres (600 ft)	2030	Residential
52	Vamsiram Newmark	Gandipet	52 floors * 2 Towers	182.5 metres (599 ft)	2028	Residential
53	ASBL Broadway	Financial District	52 floors * 3 Towers	181.93 metres (597 ft)	2029	Residential
54	Team4 Aria	Miyapur	55 floors * 7 Towers	181.8 metres (596 ft)	2031	Residential
55	My Home Grava Residences Towers 2–7	Kokapet	50 floors * 6 Towers	180 metres (591 ft)	2028	Residential
56	Vrindavan by Namishree	Spring Valley	51 floors * 8 Towers	178.8 metres (587 ft)	2029	Residential
57	Prestige Golden Grove	Patancheru	55 floors * 10 Towers	178 metres (584 ft)	2031	Residential
58	Capital 45	Puppalaguda	47 floors	177.5 metres (582 ft)	2027	Residential
59	SSI Fortune Grande Blocks B, C, D	Neopolis	50 floors * 3 Towers	176.75 metres (580 ft)	2029	Residential
60	Diamond Tower Block B	Puppalaguda	50 floors	174.75 metres (573 ft)	2027	Residential
61	Western Marina	Puppalaguda	46 floors * 4 Towers	173.6 metres (570 ft)	2027	Residential
62	SSI Fortune Grande Blocks A, E, F	Neopolis	49 floors * 3 Towers	173.45 metres (569 ft)	2029	Residential
63	The Sky 49	Osman Nagar	51 floors * 2 Towers	167.4 metres (549 ft)	2030	Residential
64	Vamsiram Vineel	Narsingi	36 floors	167 metres (548 ft)	2028	Commercial
65	Sri Aditya Vantage	Manchirevula	43 floors * 4 Towers	165 metres (541 ft)	2028	Residential
66	My Home Udyan Towers 1–8	Tellapur	49 floors * 8 Towers	163.05 metres (535 ft)	2030	Residential
67	Grava Business Park T30, T40	Neopolis	36 floors * 2 Towers	162 metres (531 ft)	2030	Commercial
68	Rajapushpa Sierra	Tellapur	50 floors * 9 Towers	161.40 metres (530 ft)	2029	Residential
69	Godrej Madison Avenue	Kokapet	50 floors	160.3 metres (526 ft)	2029	Residential
70	Greenspace Marvel	Puppalaguda	49 floors * 2 Towers	159.6 metres (524 ft)	2028	Residential
71	Hallmark Altus Tower B	Kondapur	47 floors	158.7 metres (521 ft)	2029	Residential
72	Grava Business Park Tower 2	Neopolis	35 floors	156 metres (512 ft)	2027	Commercial
73	My Home Apas Towers 4–6	Kokapet	45 floors * 3 Towers	154.95 metres (508 ft)	2028	Residential
74	Godrej Brooklyn Avenue	Kukatpally	46 floors * 2 Towers	154.58 metres (507 ft)	2031	Residential
75	Team4 Arka	Manikonda	44 floors * 6 Towers	153.9 metres (505 ft)	2029	Residential
76	NSL East Luxoria Tower C, D	Uppal Kalan	45 floors * 2 Towers	152.37 metres (500 ft)	2029	Residential
77	Sattva Lakeridge Towers 4, 5	Neopolis	38 floors * 2 Towers	152 metres (499 ft)	2028	Residential
78	Aparna Moonstone	Gopanapalli	45 floors * 8 Towers	150.35 metres (493 ft)	2029	Residential
	Total Towers (U/C)					
	150m–200m			151 Towers		
	≥200m			73 Towers		

== Tallest proposed or approved ==
This lists buildings that are only proposed or approved and are planned to rise at least up to a height of 150 metres (492 ft).

S.No.	Name	Location	Floors * No. of Towers	Height	Building Type	Status
1	The Celesta Living Tower 1	Osman Nagar	70 floors	est. 245 metres (804 ft)	Residential	Proposed
2	Malisetti Dancing Daffodils	Ghatkesar	73 floors	244.6 metres (802 ft)	Residential	Proposed
3	Trump Towers	Kokapet	65 floors * 2 Towers	242.08 metres (794 ft)	Residential	Approved
4	Rajapushpa Presidentia	Tellapur	58 floors * 3 Towers	224.1 metres (735 ft)	Residential	Approved
5	Raghuram Pradeep Puppalaguda	Puppalaguda	63 floors * 3 Towers	218 metres (715 ft)	Residential	Proposed
6	Brigade Barcelona	Neopolis	58 floors	202.3 metres (664 ft)	Residential	Approved
7	MSN Neopolis Plot 6	Neopolis	57 floors * 3 Towers	201 metres (659 ft)	Residential	Proposed
8	Unity Mall	Shaikpet	50 floors	est. 200 metres (656 ft)	Commercial	Proposed
9	Megha Lakeview	Khajaguda	48 floors	196 metres (643 ft)	Residential	Proposed
10	My Home Vanya	Kokapet	51 floors * 9 Towers	184 metres (604 ft)	Residential	Proposed
11	Auro The Altus	Raidurg	49 floors * 2 Towers	179 metres (587 ft)	Residential	Proposed
12	ASBL Legacy	RTC X Roads	51 floors * 3 Towers	166.25 metres (545 ft)	Residential	Approved
13	Terminus The Highline	Narsingi	47 floors	166 metres (545 ft)	Residential	Proposed
14	My Home TTPL Phase 4	Tellapur	50 floors * 8 Towers	est. 160 metres (525 ft)	Residential	Proposed
15	Grava Business Park Towers 5–8	Neopolis	35 floors * 4 Towers	156 metres (512 ft)	Commercial	Approved
16	Auro Sapphire	Serilingampally	48 floors * 4 Towers	est. 155 metres (509 ft)	Residential	Proposed
17	Radhey Skyverse	Osman Nagar	48 floors * 3 Towers	153.35 metres (503 ft)	Residential	Approved
18	Aparna Garnet	Gopanpally	46 floors * 8 Towers	est. 153 metres (502 ft)	Residential	Proposed
19	Mayfair Classic	Nagulapalli	48 floors * 10 Towers	152.55 metres (500 ft)	Residential	Approved
20	Mayfair Gateway	Nagulapalli	48 floors * 12 Towers	152.4 metres (500 ft)	Residential	Approved
21	The Celesta Living Towers 2,3	Osman Nagar	50 floors * 2 Towers	est. 151 metres (495 ft)	Residential	Proposed
	Total Towers (Proposed)					
	150m–200m			67 Towers		
	≥200m			15 Towers		
	Total Towers (Proposed+U/C)					
	150m–200m			218 Towers		
	≥200m			88 Towers		

== Timeline of tallest buildings and structures ==
=== Timeline of tallest structures ===
The following is a list of free-standing structures that in the past held, or currently holds, the title of the tallest structure in Hyderabad.

Name	Image	Location	Height	Floors	Years as tallest	Ref(s)
Tomb of Sultan Quli Qutb-ul-Mulk		Qutb Shahi Tombs, Ibrahim Bagh	17.8 metres (58 ft)	–	1543–1550 (7 years)	
Tomb of Jamsheed Quli Qutb Shah		Qutb Shahi Tombs, Ibrahim Bagh	30 metres (98 ft)	–	1550–1580 (30 years)	
Tomb of Ibrahim Quli Qutb Shah Wali		Qutb Shahi Tombs, Ibrahim Bagh	30 metres (98 ft)	–	1580–1591 (11 years)	
Charminar		Old City	56 metres (184 ft)	4	1591–1987 (396 years)	
Babukhan Estate		Basheerbagh	59 metres (194 ft)	17	1987–2011 (24 years)	
Indian School of Business Housing Tower		Gachibowli	65.5 metres (215 ft)	19	2011–2012 (1 year)	
Saket Sriyam Sumeru		Secunderabad	80 metres (262 ft)	26	2012–2014 (2 years)	
Lodha Bellezza		Kukatpally	153 metres (502 ft)	45	2014–2024 (10 years)	
SAS iTower A		Khajaguda	153.95 metres (505 ft)	35	2024–2024 (<1 year)	
SAS Crown		Kokapet	235.3 metres (772 ft)	58	2024–present	

=== Timeline of tallest habitable buildings ===
The following list includes only habitable buildings that in the past held, or currently holds, the title of the tallest building in Hyderabad.

Name	Image	Location	Height	Floors	Years as tallest	Ref(s)
Saifabad Palace		Saifabad	est. 16 metres (52 ft)	2	1888–1893 (5 years)	
Falaknuma Palace		Falaknuma	est. 26 metres (85 ft)	3	1893–1925 (32 years)	
Osmania General Hospital		Afzal Gunj	est. 28 metres (92 ft)	4	1925–1987 (62 years)	
Babukhan Estate		Basheerbagh	59 metres (194 ft)	17	1987–2011 (24 years)	
Indian School of Business Housing Tower		Gachibowli	65.5 metres (215 ft)	19	2011–2012 (1 year)	
Saket Sriyam Sumeru		Secunderabad	80 metres (262 ft)	26	2012–2014 (2 years)	
Lodha Bellezza		Kukatpally	153 metres (502 ft)	45	2014–2024 (10 years)	
SAS iTower A		Khajaguda	153.95 metres (505 ft)	35	2024–2024 (<1 year)	
SAS Crown		Kokapet	235.3 metres (772 ft)	58	2024–present	

== See also ==
- List of tallest buildings in India
- List of tallest buildings in Asia
- List of tallest buildings in the World
- List of tallest buildings in different cities in India
