= SAS Crown =

Tallest skyscraper in Hyderabad, India

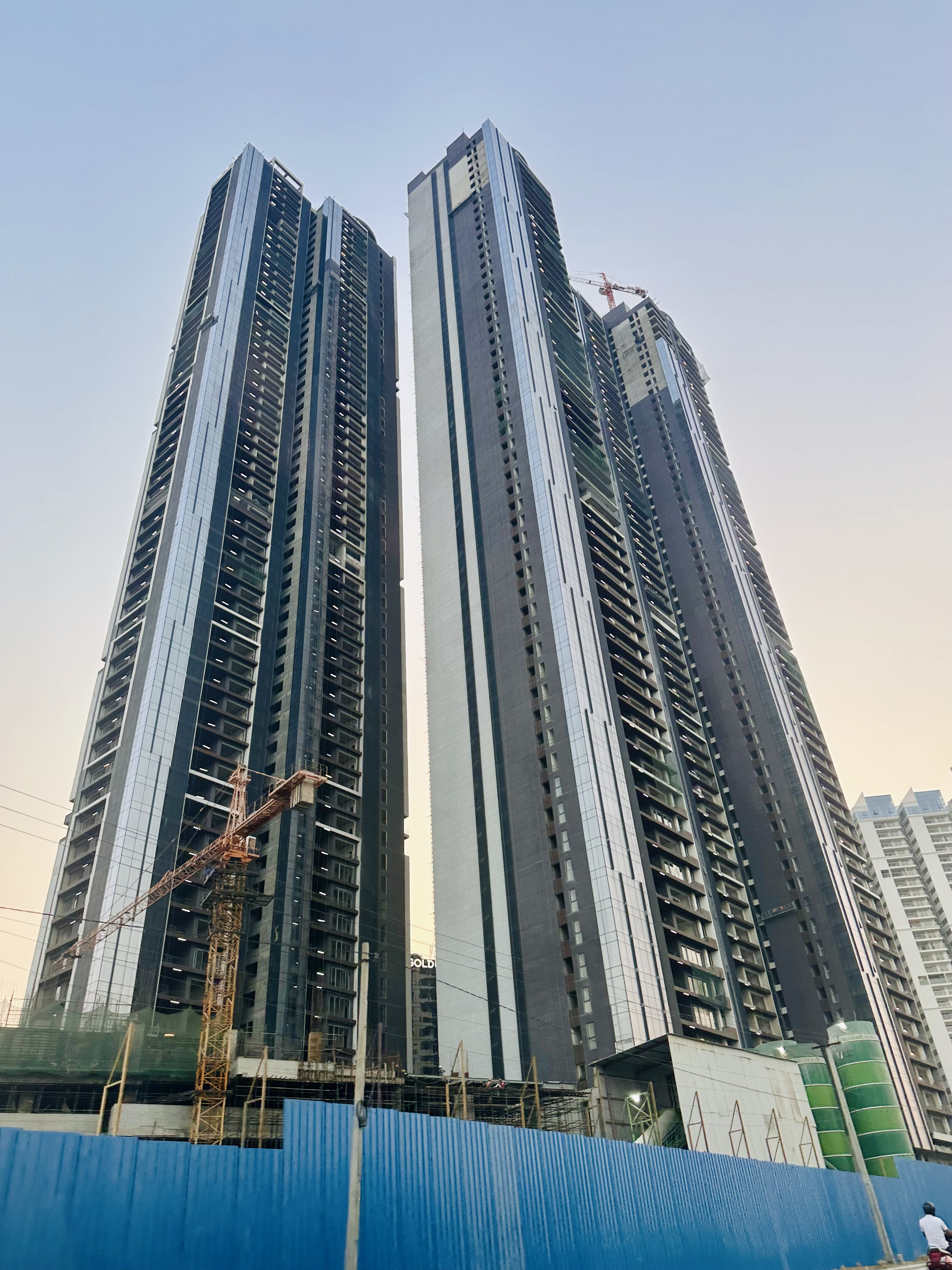
- SAS Crown in May 2025

Record height
- Tallest in Hyderabad since 2024^{[I]}

General information
- Status: Completed
- Type: Residential skyscrapers
- Location: Golden Mile Road, Kokapet, Hyderabad, Telangana 500075
- Coordinates: 17.4015°N 78.3394°E
- Construction started: 2021
- Topped-out: October 2024
- Completed: 2027

Height
- Height: 244 metres (800.5 ft)

Technical details
- Material: Concrete with partial glass facade
- Floor count: G+59

Design and construction
- Architects: Simón N.A.F., Aedas
- Main contractor: SAS Infra

Website
- sasinfra.com/sas-crown/

SAS Crown is a high-rise residential skyscraper complex located in Kokapet, Hyderabad, Telangana, India. Designed by international architecture firm Aedas, the development consists of three residential towers, with each tower reaching a height of 244 metres (801 ft) across G+59 floors.

Upon its completion, it became the tallest building in Hyderabad and South India.

== History and development ==
The project was planned and launched by Hyderabad-based real estate firm SAS Infra as part of the rapid high-rise commercial and residential development in the Financial District and Kokapet Neopolis region. Construction commenced following regulatory approvals and height clearances from civil aviation authorities for high-rise structures in the Kokapet region. By late 2024, the building topped out, officially entering the 200-metre skyscraper category, and becoming the tallest building in Hyderabad.

== Architecture and design ==
Designed by global architectural firm Aedas and led by architect Simon Naf, SAS Crown incorporates a modern high-rise residential framework tailored for high-density living. The structural design features three residential towers, engineered to meet seismic zone standards for high-rise developments in the Deccan region.

The complex is planned with single-apartment-per-floor layouts in key towers to accommodate large-format residential units. The master plan includes dedicated green spaces, high-altitude recreational facilities, and multi-level basement parking.

== Location and connectivity ==
SAS Crown is situated on the Golden Mile Road in Kokapet, adjacent to the Hyderabad Financial District and Gachibowli technology hub. It is located near the Outer Ring Road (ORR), providing direct connectivity to Rajiv Gandhi International Airport and major IT corridors across western Hyderabad.

== See also ==
- List of tallest buildings in Hyderabad
- List of tallest buildings in India
- Architecture of Hyderabad
