= Kokapet =

Suburb near Hyderabad, Telangana

- Suburb
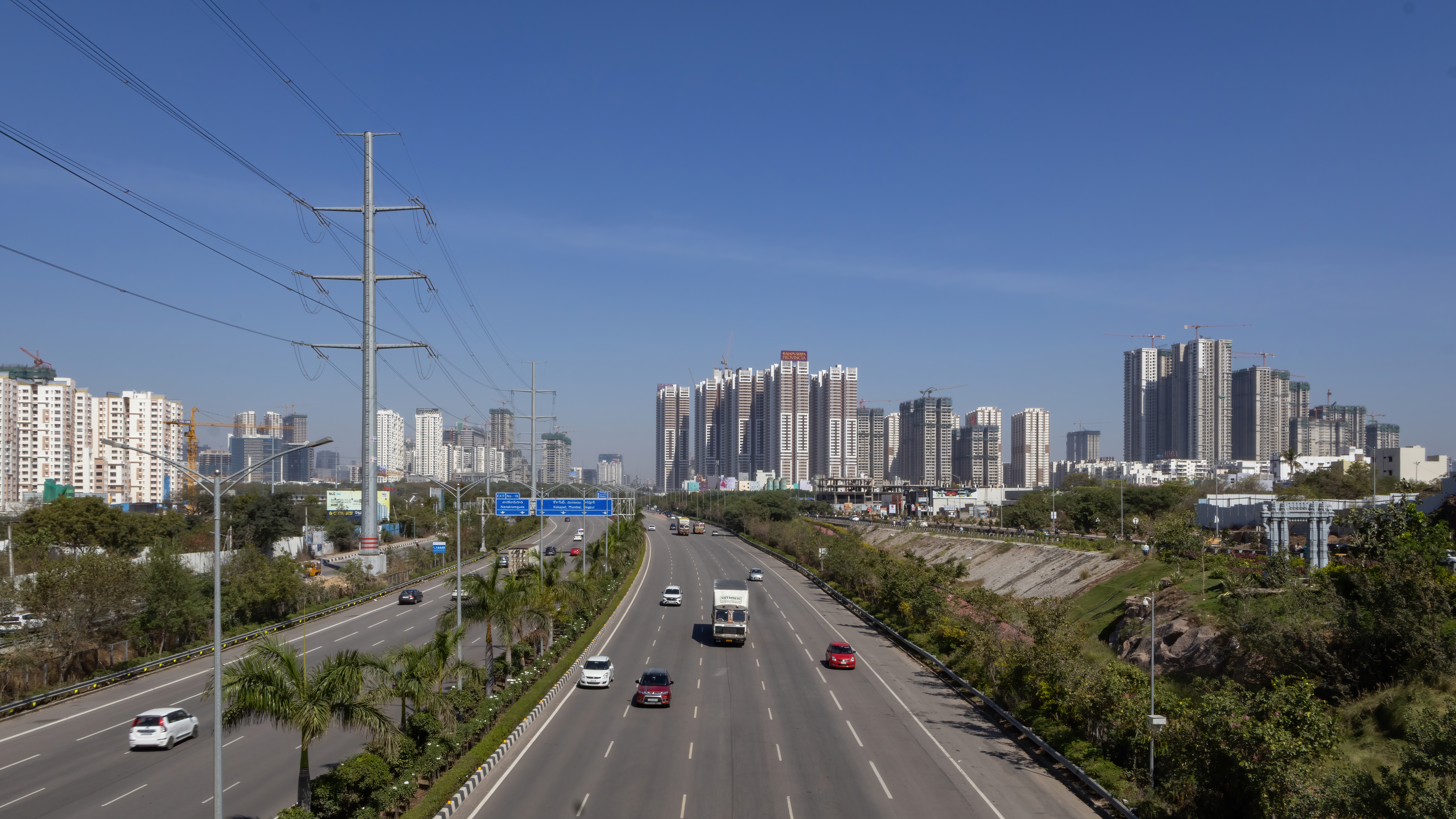
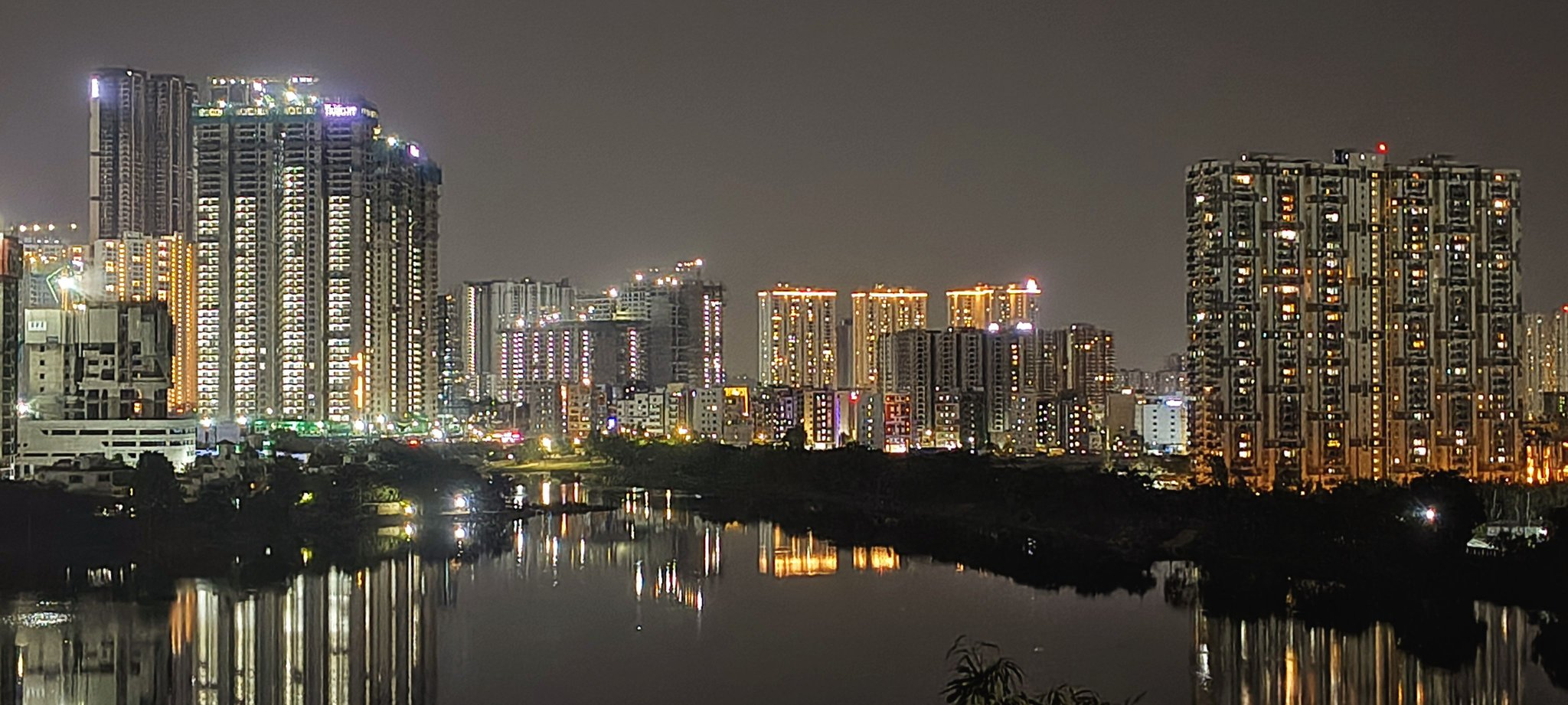
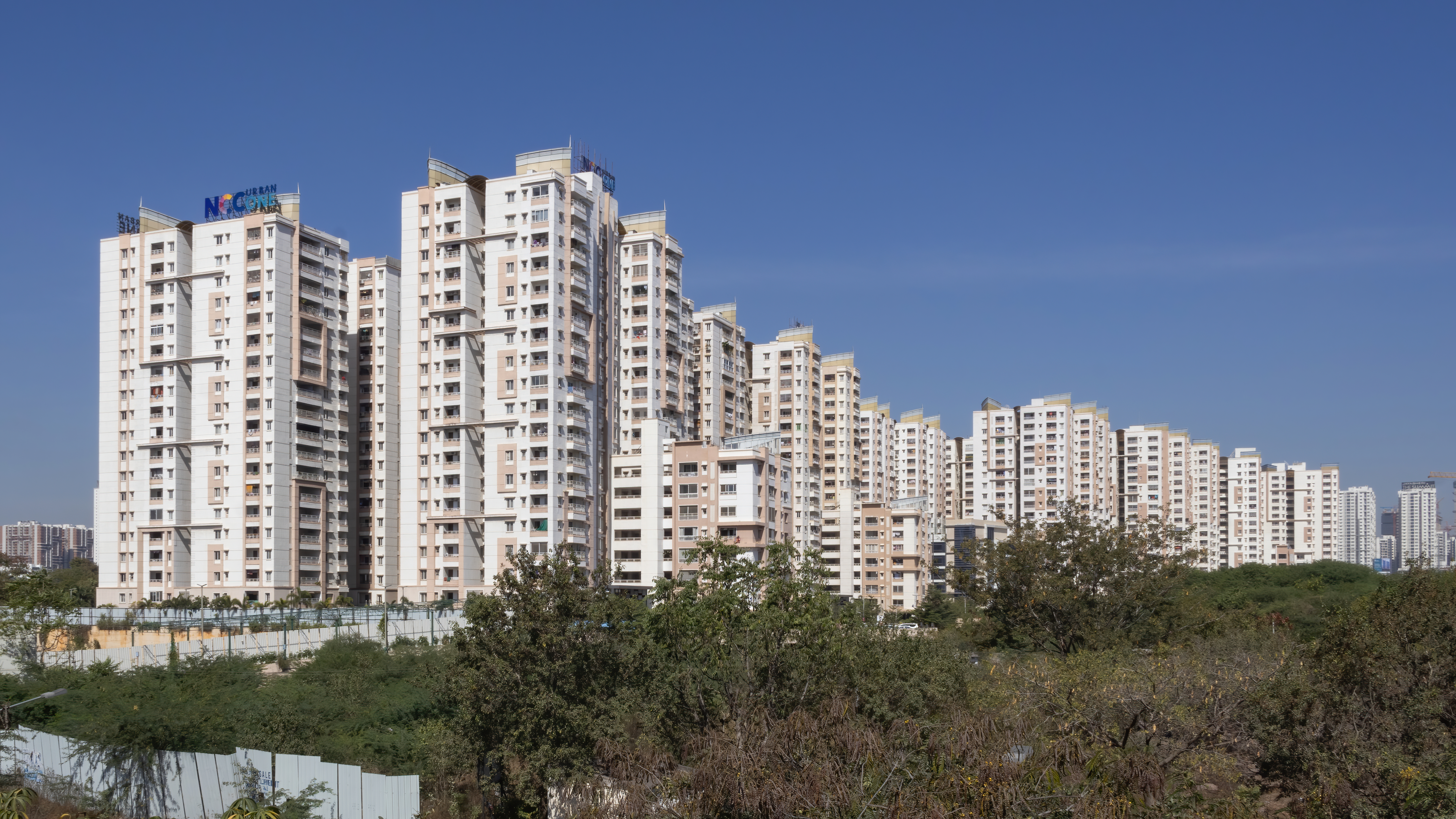
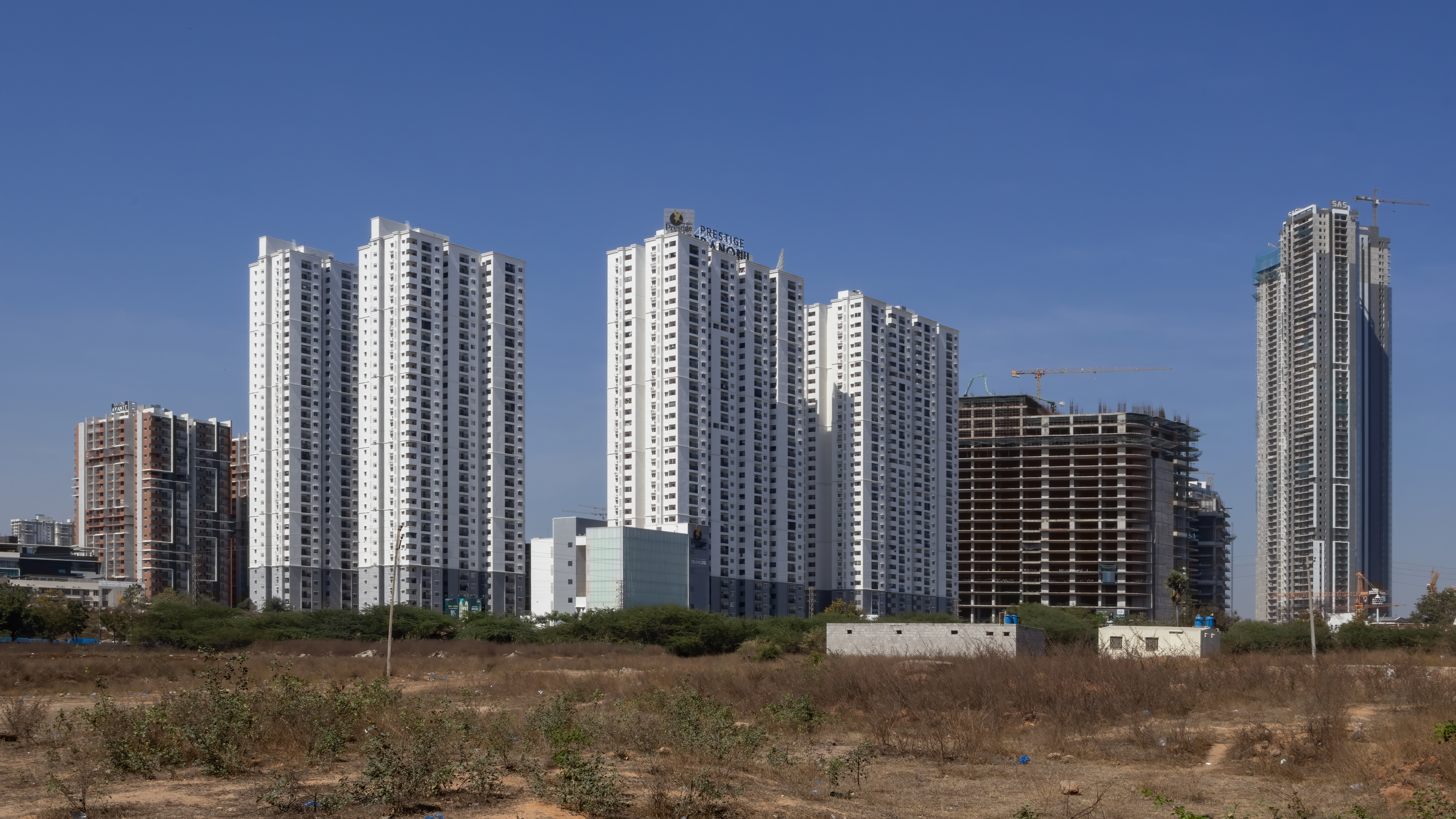
- Clockwise from top: Building along Outer Ring Road, NCC Urban One at Kokapet Junction, SAS Crown under construction and cityscape of Kokapet

- Location in Hyderabad Telangana Location in India
- Coordinates: 17°23′44″N 78°20′05″E
- Country: India
- State: Telangana
- District: Ranga Reddy
- Mandal: Gandipet

Population
  - Total: 3,471
- Postal code: 500075
- ISO 3166 code: IN-TG
- Website: telangana.gov.in

Kokapet is a suburb in the Ranga Reddy District of Telangana, India. As of 2011, it had a resident population of 3,471. It lies within the Kokapet Special Economic Zone (KSEZ) (Neopolis) and is a major commercial and residential area in the western part of Hyderabad. It falls under Gandipet Mandal. It is three kilometres north of Gandipet and is close to Rajiv Gandhi International Airport; it is adjacent to Financial District, Hyderabad and in the vicinity of the IT hub.

In 2021, Hyderabad-based company My Home Group finalised plans to build one of India's largest private IT parks at Kokapet, occupying 30–35 million square feet. The project is estimated to cost around $2 billion and is being developed as a business district along the lines of Gurugram's Cyber Hub, which was developed by DLF. The commercial project on an 80‑acre plot will comprise a combination of SEZ and non‑SEZ development along with MICE (Meetings, Incentives, Conferences, Exhibitions) tourism, a star hotel, retail, and entertainment facilities. The layout development is proposed to connect to the Outer Ring Road by building a trumpet interchange at the Kokapet layout and providing additional access to the highway at Narsingi. OKOS Gokarting is also located in Kokapet. A Mass Rapid Transit System (MRTS) is being planned in the Kokapet area. The earlier proposed Elevated Bus Rapid Transit System (EBRTS) project, also known as Metro Neo, from Kukatpally Housing Board (KPHB) to Narsingi—covering parts of the IT corridor including Kokapet—has been put on hold by the Government of Telangana.

Many of the tallest buildings in Hyderabad are located in Kokapet, including SAS Crown, which is the tallest building in Hyderabad and South India. My Home Nishada is another residential project with eight skyscrapers located in this area.

In October 2017, Justices A. K. Sikri and Ashok Bhushan of the Supreme Court of India dismissed the claim of K. S. B. Ali and others, who claimed to be legal heirs of Nawab Nusarath Jung I, regarding the Golden Mile project at Kokapet. The higher court held that the lower court had no power to confer rights over jagir lands except cash grants, upholding the state’s position that 1,635 acres at Kokapet (Asadnagar) are government land under the Sarf-e-Khas (Merger) Regulation. The Hyderabad Metropolitan Development Authority (HMDA) auctioned 70 acres of land in Kokapet village, Rajendranagar mandal, in July 2006.

ASBL Spire Neopolis Hyderabad

A total of 168 acres were put up for auction, fetching ₹1,775 crore for the Authority, including a bid amount of ₹14.5 crore per acre for a five‑acre plot.

GAR & Sons builders have built an IT park where several companies have leased office space.

== See also ==
- Narsingi, Ranga Reddy district
- Gandipet
