= Saifabad Palace =

Building in India

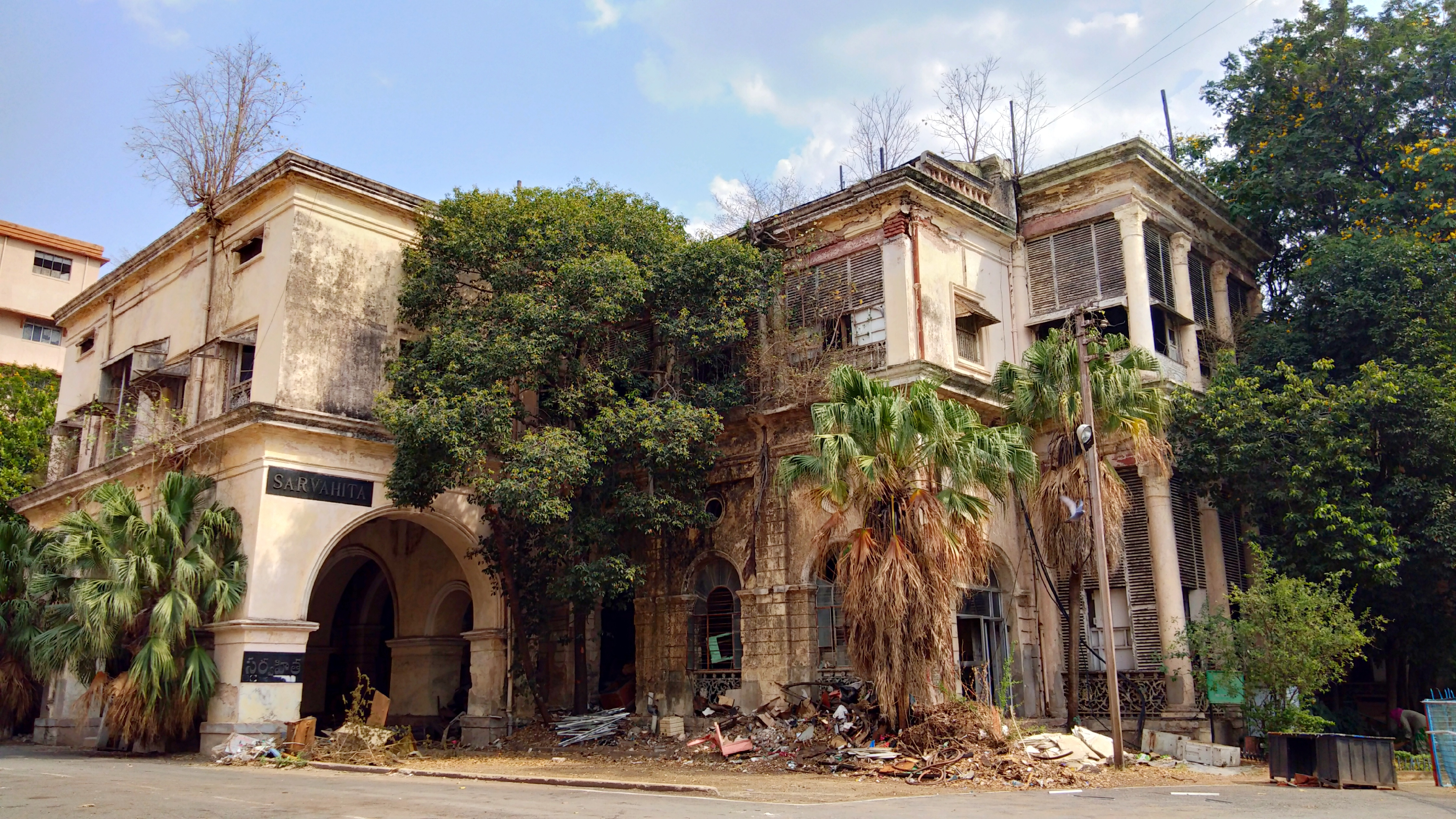

- Location within Hyderabad
- Alternative names: Sarvahita (G-Block)

General information
- Status: Demolished
- Type: Royal Palace
- Architectural style: European
- Location: Hyderabad, India
- Coordinates: 17.4099°N 78.4690°E
- Completed: 1888; 138 years ago
- Opened: 1940; 86 years ago
- Demolished: 2020; 6 years ago
- Client: Nizam of Hyderabad
- Owner: Government of Telangana

Saifabad Palace (commonly known as Sarvahita (G-Block)) was a palace in the city of Hyderabad, Telangana, India. Built in 1885 by Mahboob Ali Khan, the sixth Nizam of Hyderabad, it served as the seat of government for various Indian states until its demolition in 2020.

== History ==
Saifabad Palace was built in 1888 during the reign of sixth Nizam of Hyderabad, Mahbub Ali Khan, Asaf Jah VI. At the time of its completion, it was the tallest building in Hyderabad. However, when the Nizam visited the palace, two local nobles successfully conspired to deter him from occupying the palace by having a Monitor lizard, a sign of bad luck in his path, cross his path. The Nizam then locked the palace up.

In the 1940s, it was re-opened to house the government of the Hyderabad princely state (1910-1948), the state of Hyderabad (1948-1956), Andhra Pradesh (1956-2014) and Telangana (2014-2020).

== Demolition ==
In 2011, there was a plan to demolish the palace and build a bigger office in its palace but the plan was shelved after opposition from the people.

In November 2016, K. Chandrashekar Rao, the chief minister of Telangana proposed demolishing the palace because it was unlucky for reportedly not following the architectural principles of Vaastu. Rao believed that Telangana will suffer for having the building house its government, and only visits the building for cabinet meetings. Rao asked the state governor to tell N. Chandrababu Naidu, the Chief Minister of Andhra Pradesh to vacate the building so it can be demolished and replaced with a Vaastu-compliant structure. The demolition was placed on hold after a petition to the Hyderabad high court by an opposition legislator.

In July 2020, the place was demolished to accommodate a new secretariat for the state of Telangana. Apart from Sarvahita (G-Block), the age old stone structure, Mint Compound, which housed the power department offices was also razed.
