= Puppalguda =

Puppalaguda
- Village
- Location in Hyderabad Telangana Location in India
- Country: India
- State: Telangana
- District: Ranga Reddy
- Metro: Hyderabad

Government
  - Body: Mandal Office

Languages
  - Official: Telugu
- Time zone: UTC+5:30 (IST)
- Postal code: 500089
- Vehicle registration: TS
- Planning agency: Manikonda municipality
- Civic agency: Mandal Office

Puppalaguda is a village in Manikonda municipality in Ranga Reddy district, Telangana, India. It falls under Gandipet mandal.

EIPL Cornerstone, Fortune Greenhomes Golden Oriole, Greenspace Prime Apartments BRC apartments, Begonia Homes, Greenspace Tulasi and Peetani Coconuts are the famous gated communities in this area. Many of the tallest buildings in Hyderabad are located in Puppalaguda, with Phoenix Triton being the tallest among them.
