= Nanakramguda =

Nanakramguda Financial District
- Neighbourhood
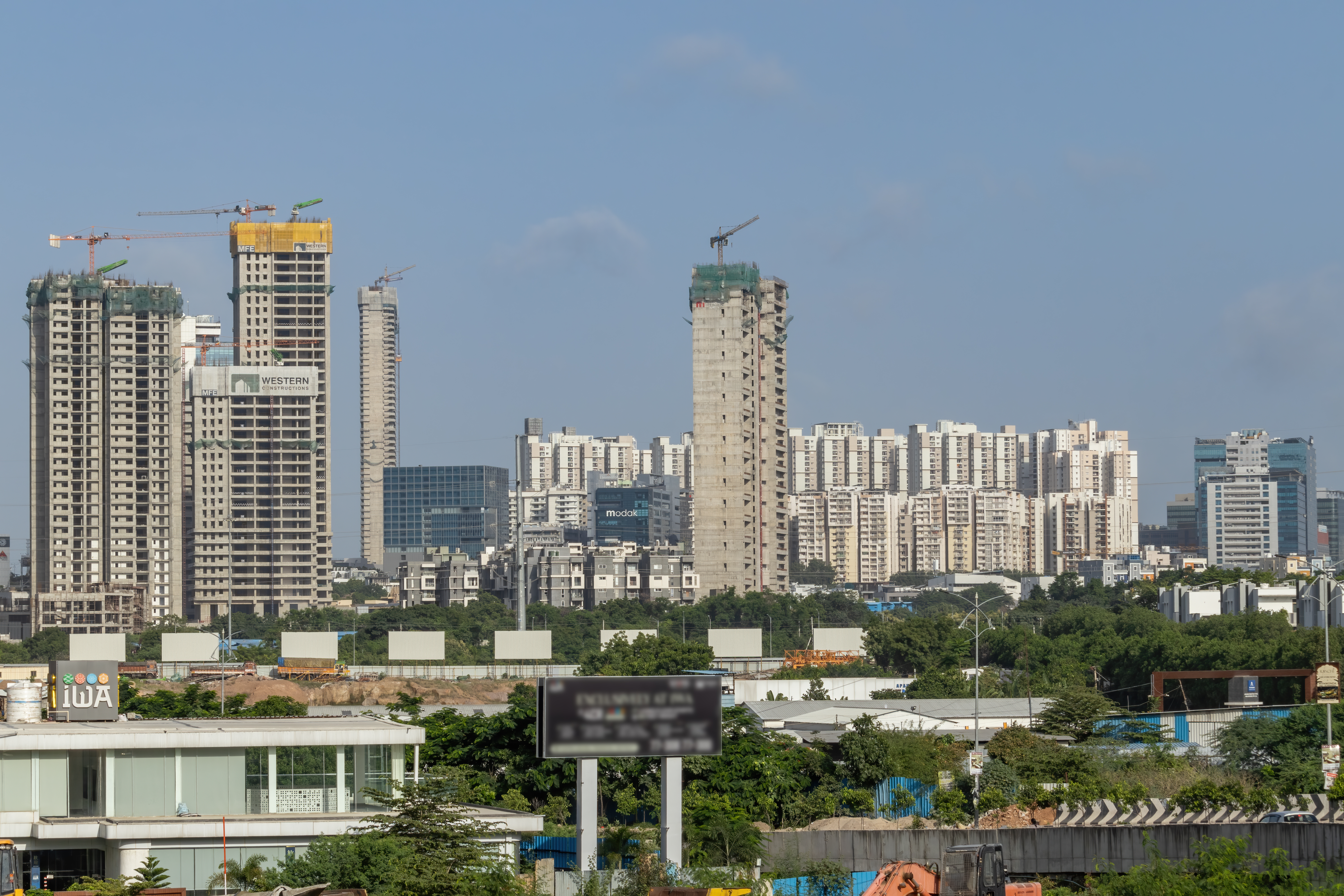
- Skyline of Nanakramguda from Gachibowli

- Location in Telangana, India Nanakramguda (Telangana) Nanakramguda (India)
- Coordinates: 17°25′N 78°21′E
- Country: India
- State: Telangana
- District: Ranga Reddy District
- Metro: Hyderabad

Government
  - Body: GHMC

Languages
  - Official: Telugu, Urdu
- Time zone: UTC+5:30 (IST)
- PIN: 500 032
- Vehicle registration: TG
- Lok Sabha constituency: Hyderabad
- Vidhan Sabha constituency: Serilingampally
- Planning agency: GHMC
- Website: telangana.gov.in

Nanakramguda is a fast-growing residential location in West Zone of Hyderabad, India. Nanakramguda is part of Financial District and is an IT, real estate and architectural suburb in Serlingampally mandal, in Hyderabad, India. The first phase of financial district is home to TSI Business parks, IT/ITES special economic zones, Tishman Speyer's, Waverock Building, which houses multinational conglomerates. The Nanakramguda Village, Film Nagar, and Nanakramguda temple are near to this IT Suburb. Medi Kunta Lake, also known as Wipro lake, is located here. A few of the tallest buildings in Hyderabad are located in Nanakramguda, with The Olympus by Sumadhura being the tallest among them.

The US Consulate in Hyderabad has its own building here in Nanakramguda, Financial District.

== See also ==
- Manikonda
- Gachibowli
- Kokapet
- Kondapur
- Raidurg
