= Tellapur =

- Town
- Location in Telangana, India Tellapur (Telangana) Tellapur (India)
- Coordinates: 17.468242°N 78.284715°E
- Country: India
- State: Telangana
- District: Sangareddy
- Mandal: Ramachandrapuram
- Metro: Hyderabad Metropolitan Region

Government
  - Type: Municipality
  - Body: Tellapur Municipality

Population (Census 2011)
  - Total: 24,193

Languages
  - Official: Telugu
- Time zone: UTC+5:30 (IST)
- PIN: 502032
- Telephone code: 040
- Vehicle registration: TG 15
- Website: tellapurmunicipality.telangana.gov.in

Tellapur is a satellite town of Hyderabad in Ramachandrapuram mandal of Sangareddy district in the Indian state of Telangana.

The town is one of the fastest-growing locales in Hyderabad Metropolitan Region owing to its close proximity to IT hub and Outer Ring Road. A few of the tallest buildings in Hyderabad are located in Tellapur, with the four My Home Vipina towers being the tallest among them.
