= SAS iTower =

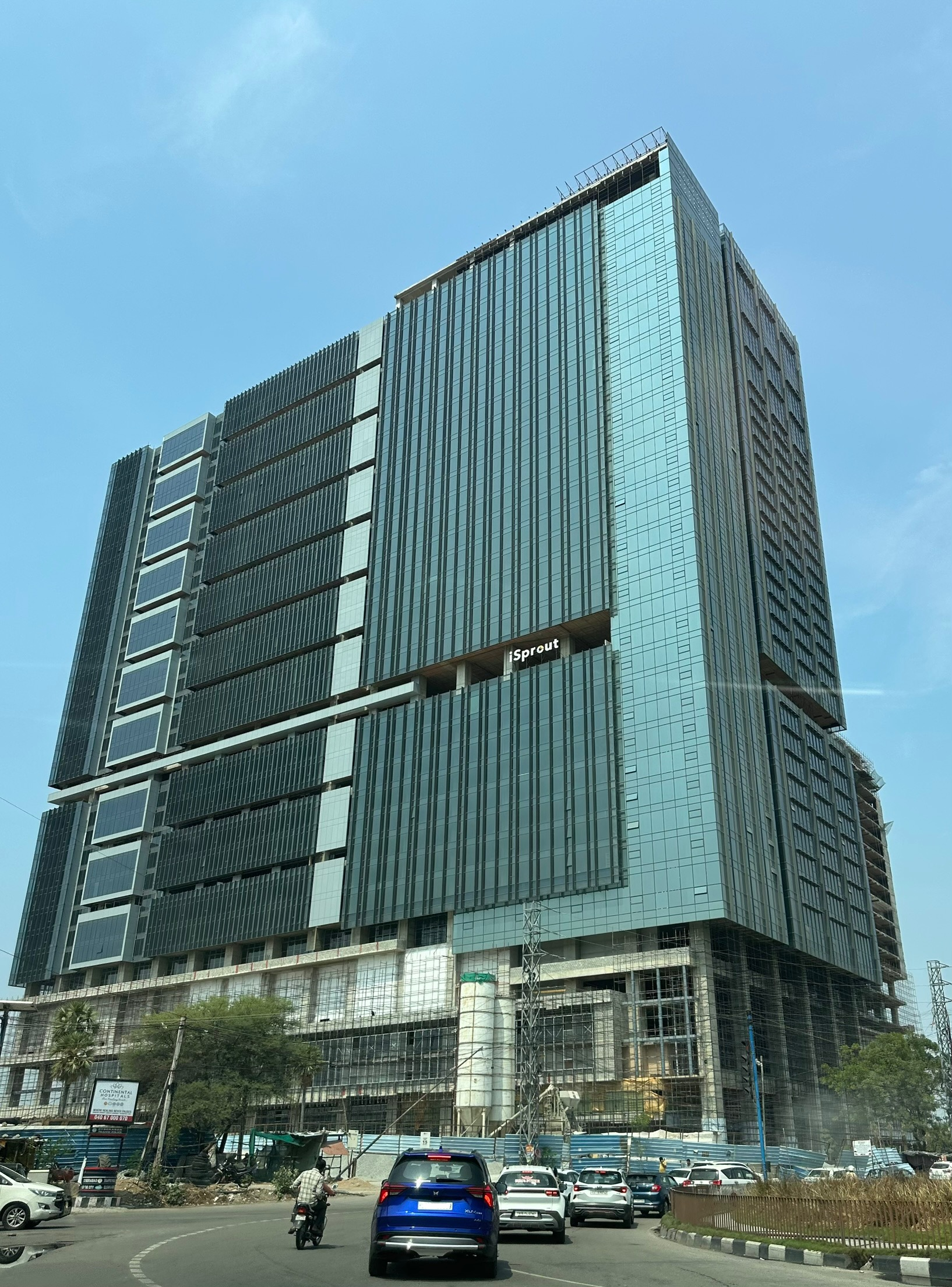
- SAS iTower A1 in May 2025
- Interactive map of the SAS iTower area

General information
- Status: Towers A1, A2: Completed; Tower B: Under construction
- Type: Mixed-use skyscraper
- Architectural style: Modern
- Location: Khajaguda, Hyderabad, Telangana, India
- Coordinates: 17°25′09″N 78°21′36″E
- Completed: Tower A1: 2025; Tower A2: 2026

Height
- Height: Tower A1: 153.95 m (505.1 ft); Tower A2: 83 m (272 ft); Tower B: 153.95 m (505.1 ft)

Technical details
- Structural system: Reinforced concrete
- Floor count: Tower A1: 37; Tower A2: 20; Tower B: 37
- Floor area: Tower A1: 484,586 m^{2} (5,216,040 sq ft)

Design and construction
- Architect: Aedas
- Developer: SAS Infra

Other information
- Parking: 6-level basement parking

SAS iTower is a multi-tower commercial office complex located in Khajaguda, near the Financial District of Hyderabad, Telangana, India. Developed by SAS Infra, the complex comprises three distinct structures — Tower A1, Tower A2, and Tower B — built in phases. It was the first office skyscraper in Hyderabad. At the time of its structural topping out in 2024, it was the tallest building in Hyderabad.

Tower A1 features 5.2 million sqft of built-up floor space, making it the largest skyscraper in the world by floor area and the fourth largest office building in the world.

== Architecture and structure ==
The SAS iTower complex is designed to accommodate large-scale commercial and IT corporate operations. The development consists of three primary structures:

- Tower A1: The tallest tower in the complex, Tower A1 stands at 153.95 m (505.1 ft) with 37 floors. It was officially completed in 2025.
- Tower A2: Completed in 2026, Tower A2 reaches a height of 83 m (272 ft) across 20 floors.
- Tower B: The third tower in the development is currently under construction and will rise to the same height as Tower A1 at 153.95 m (505.1 ft) with 37 floors.

The base of the complex incorporates mixed-use elements, including a multiplex, a multi-cuisine food court, and retail zones, alongside the primary Grade A+ office spaces.

The exterior facade of the complex features India's largest digital out-of-home (DOOH) display, with a 586 m^{2} (6,310 sq ft) 8K anamorphic 3D screen.

== Location and access ==
SAS iTower is located in Khajaguda, adjacent to the Nanakramguda and Gachibowli information technology corridors in western Hyderabad. The complex is situated near the Outer Ring Road (ORR), which connects the area to the Rajiv Gandhi International Airport and the wider metropolitan region.

== See also ==
- List of tallest buildings in Hyderabad
- List of tallest buildings in India
- HITEC City
- Khajaguda
