= Nanakramguda Temple =

Sri Ranganathaswamy Temple

Religion
- Affiliation: Hinduism
- Deity: Ranganatha

Location
- Location: Hyderabad
- State: Telangana
- Country: India

Architecture
- Type: South Indian

Nanakramguda temple or Sri Ranganadha swamy temple is a 400-year-old Ranganatha temple in Nanakramguda, near Manikonda in Hyderabad. It is located at Rangbagh in Nanakramguda, which is approximately 15 km from Mehdipatnam.
