= Financial District, Hyderabad =

Financial District
- Central business district
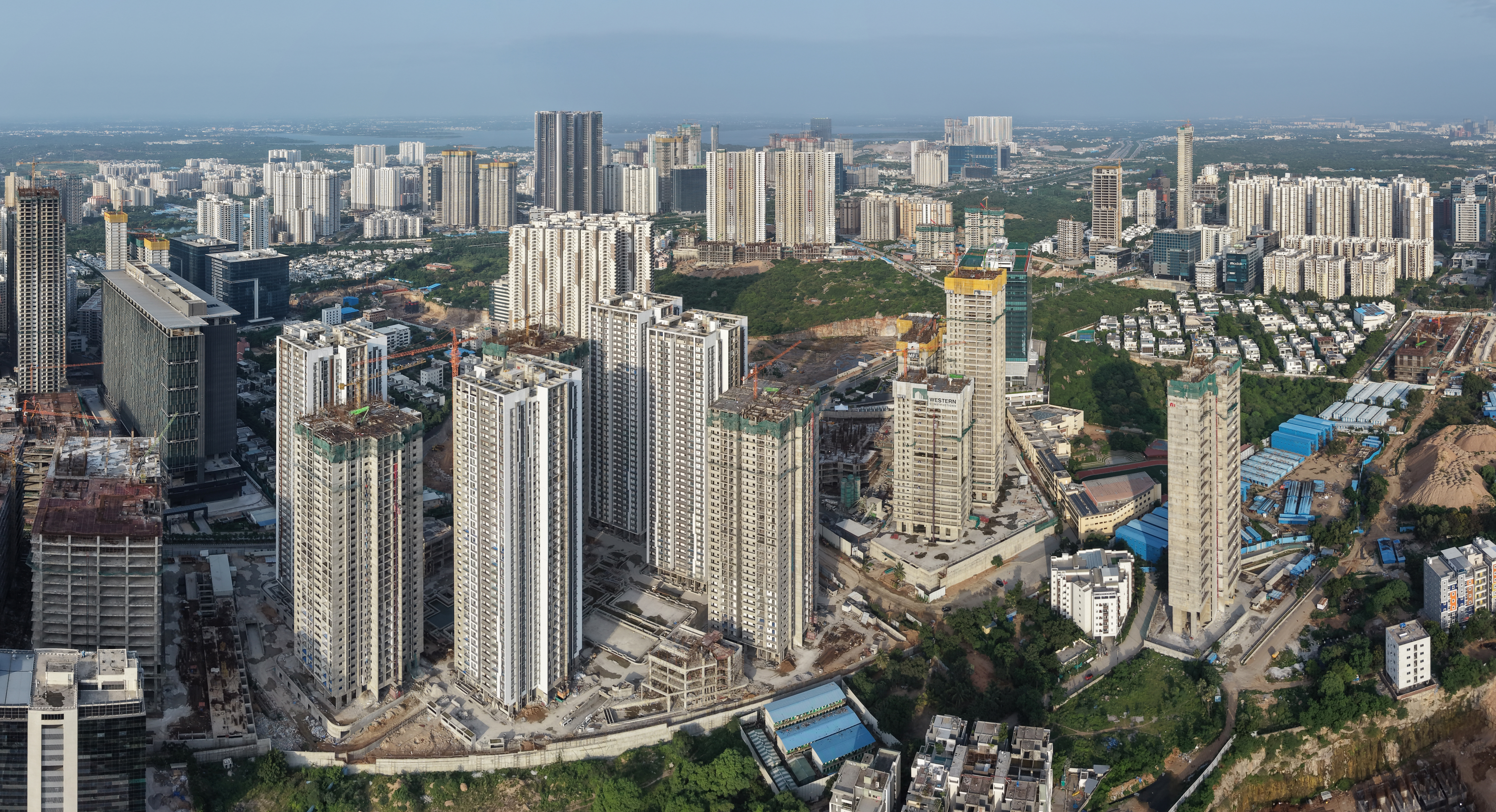
- From top: Amazon office building, WaveRock

- Location in Hyderabad, India Financial District (Telangana) Financial District (India)
- Coordinates: 17°25′N 78°21′E
- Country: India
- State: Telangana
- District: Ranga Reddy District
- Metro: Hyderabad
- Established: 22 November 2004; 21 years ago
- Founder: Government of Andhra Pradesh

Government
  - Body: GHMC

Area
  - Total: 0.30 km^{2} (0.12 sq mi)

Languages
  - Official: Telugu, Urdu
- Time zone: UTC+5:30 (IST)
- PIN: 500 008
- Vehicle registration: TG
- Lok Sabha constituency: Hyderabad
- Vidhan Sabha constituency: Serilingampally
- Planning agency: GHMC
- Website: telangana.gov.in

The Financial District is a premier information technology, real estate, and architectural suburb located in the Serlingampally mandal of Hyderabad, India. Spanning an initial area of 100-acre (0.40 km^{2}), it serves as a core economic engine of the city's western corridor. It is part of the larger cluster of technology townships and business hubs is collectively known as Cyberabad, a high-tech metropolitan zone for IT, banking, and financial services.

== History ==
The Financial District was an initiative of the N. Chandrababu Naidu TDP government and its foundation stone was laid by the then Prime Minister of India, Atal Bihari Vajpayee, in 2001. The neighbourhoods of Nanakramguda and Gachibowli were part of the first phase of the Financial District.

The first phase is home to TSI Business Parks, special economic zones (SEZs), and the WaveRock Building, which houses multinational conglomerates. WaveRock is a 2.5 million square foot Information Technology-SEZ in Nanakramguda covering about 12 acres.

By 2019, The SEZ housed over 25 information technology companies including Apple, GAP, Accenture, Development Bank of Singapore, and DuPont, and has between 25,000 and 30,000 employees working out of the premises. In December 2019, WaveRock was bought by the Shapoorji Pallonji Real Estate Fund for Rs 1,800 crore from Tishman Speyer.

== Companies and IT Parks ==
ICICI Bank also has Asia's biggest work place with over 4 million square feet of space. The Nanakramguda Village, Film Nagar, and Nanakramguda temple are nearby.

Major hospitals like Continental Hospital, Care and AIG are in the vicinity. SAS iTower, a high-rise commercial complex on Khajaguda-Nanakramguda Road, was the tallest building in Hyderabad upon its completion in 2024.

The US consulate in Hyderabad shifted to Nanakramguda on 20 March 2023. Spread across a 12.3-acre site, it will be the largest US consular processing campus in-South East Asia, both in terms of the number of visa windows and in area. The current US consulate campus in historic Paigah Palace in Chiran Fort Club lane in Begumpet will be shifted to Nanakramguda.

On 21 August 2019, Amazon opened its largest campus in the world at Nanakramguda. It is the first Amazon-owned campus located outside the United States and features the largest Amazon-owned building in the world. The 9.7-acre campus houses over 15,000 employees.

Google's new Hyderabad facility in the Financial District, Nanakramguda will be a 3.3 Million sft energy efficient campus built with sustainability. Google acquired the 7.3-acre site in 2019.

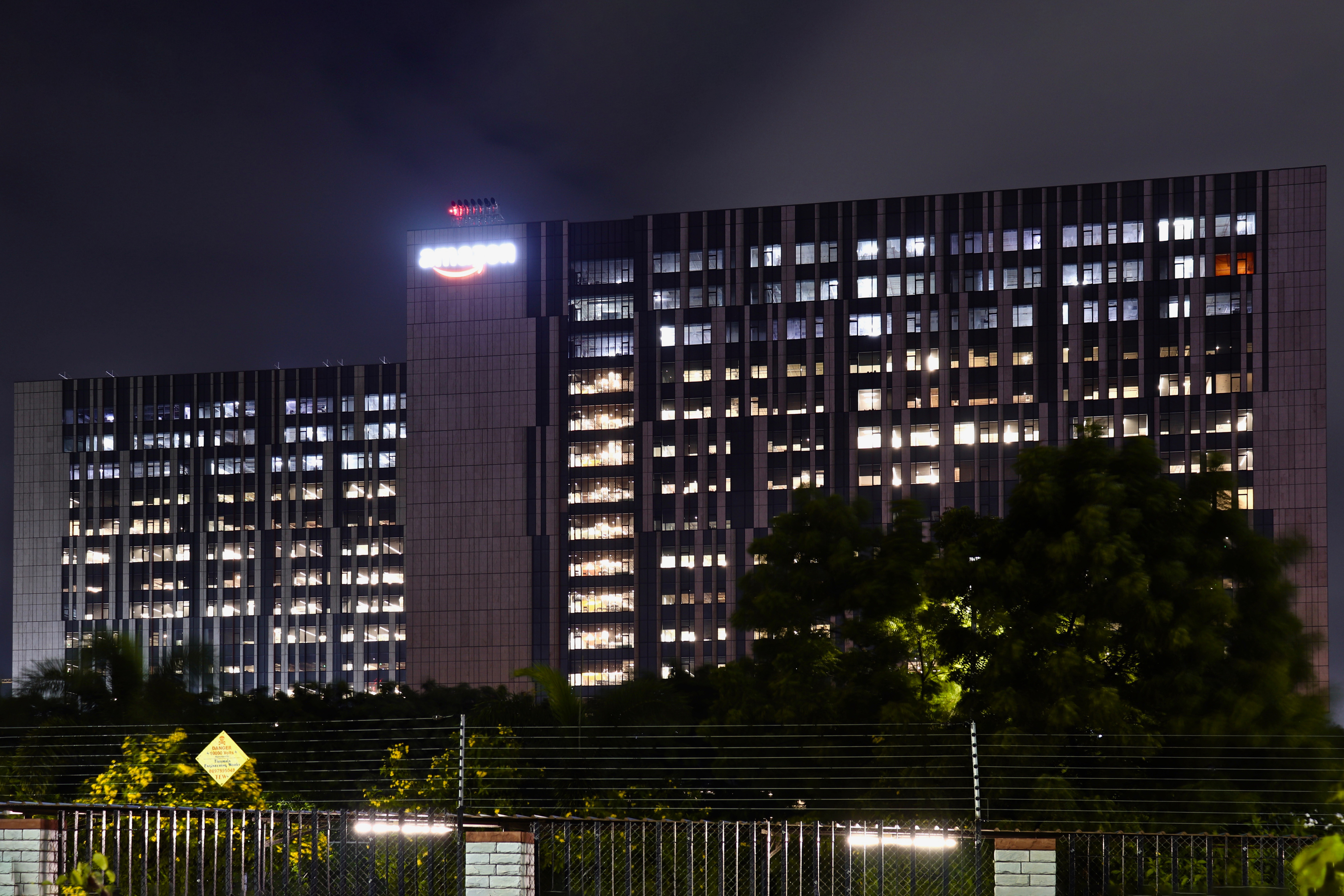
Amazon campus in Financial district

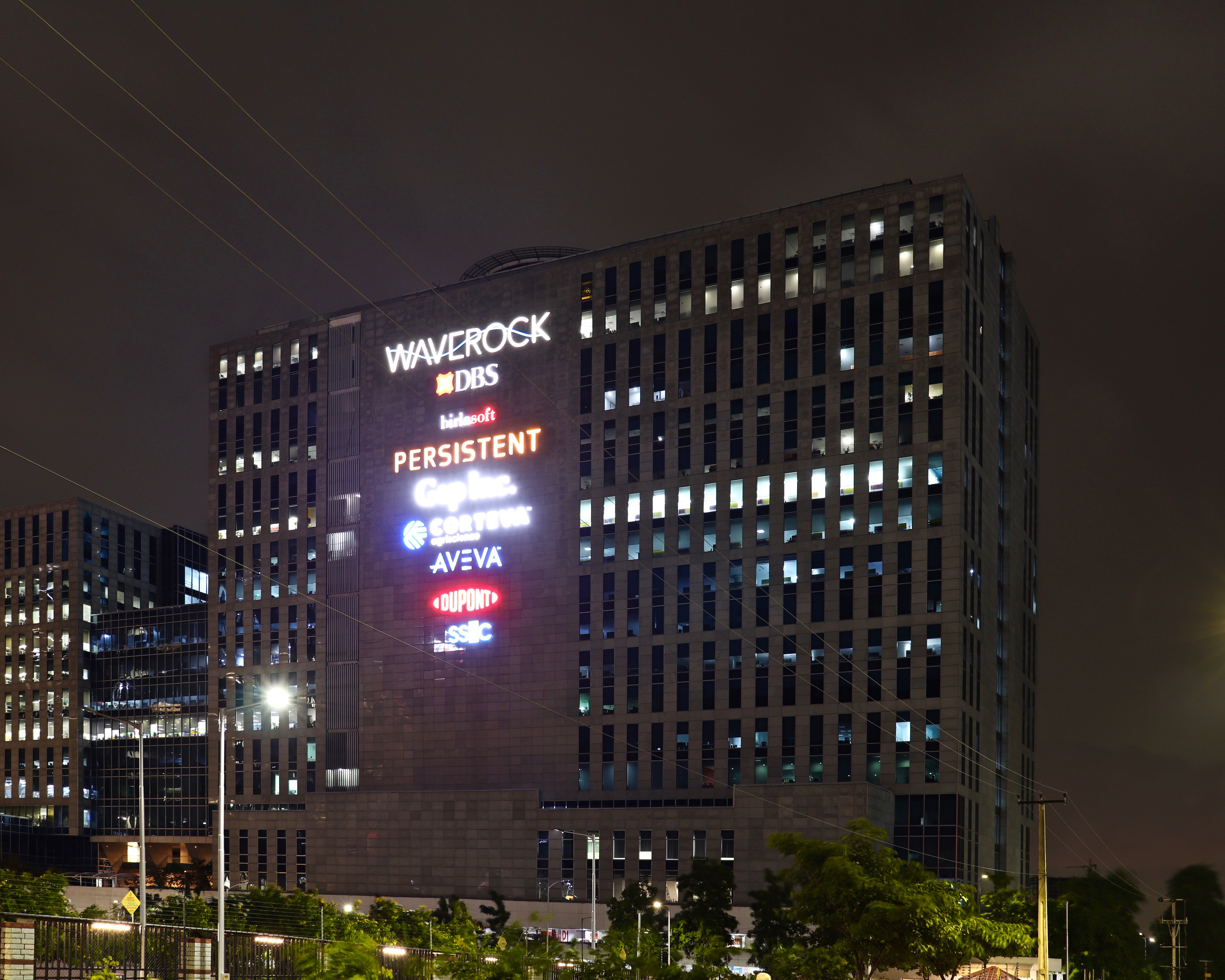
Waverock buildings

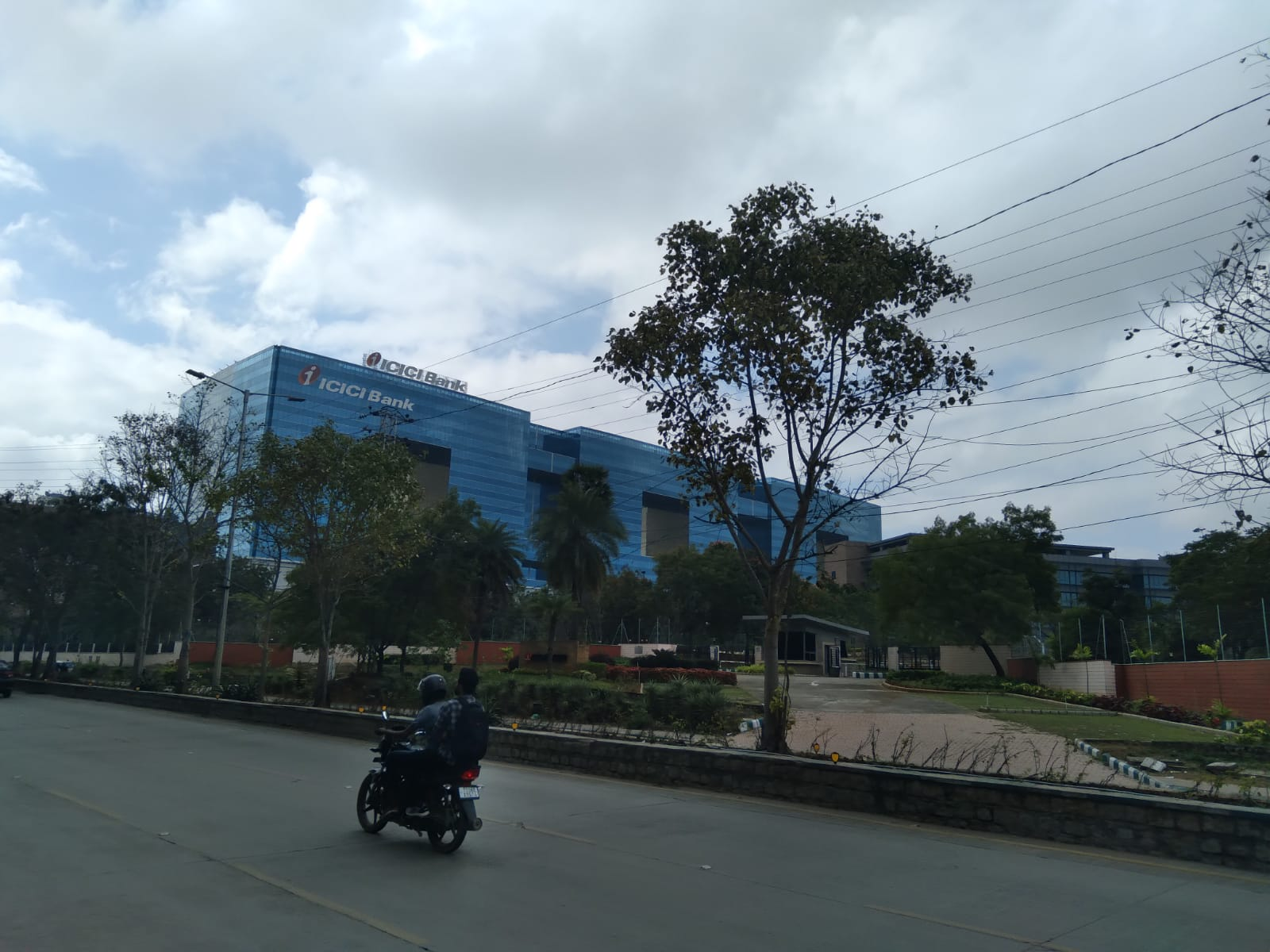
ICICI Bank Financial District Hyderabad

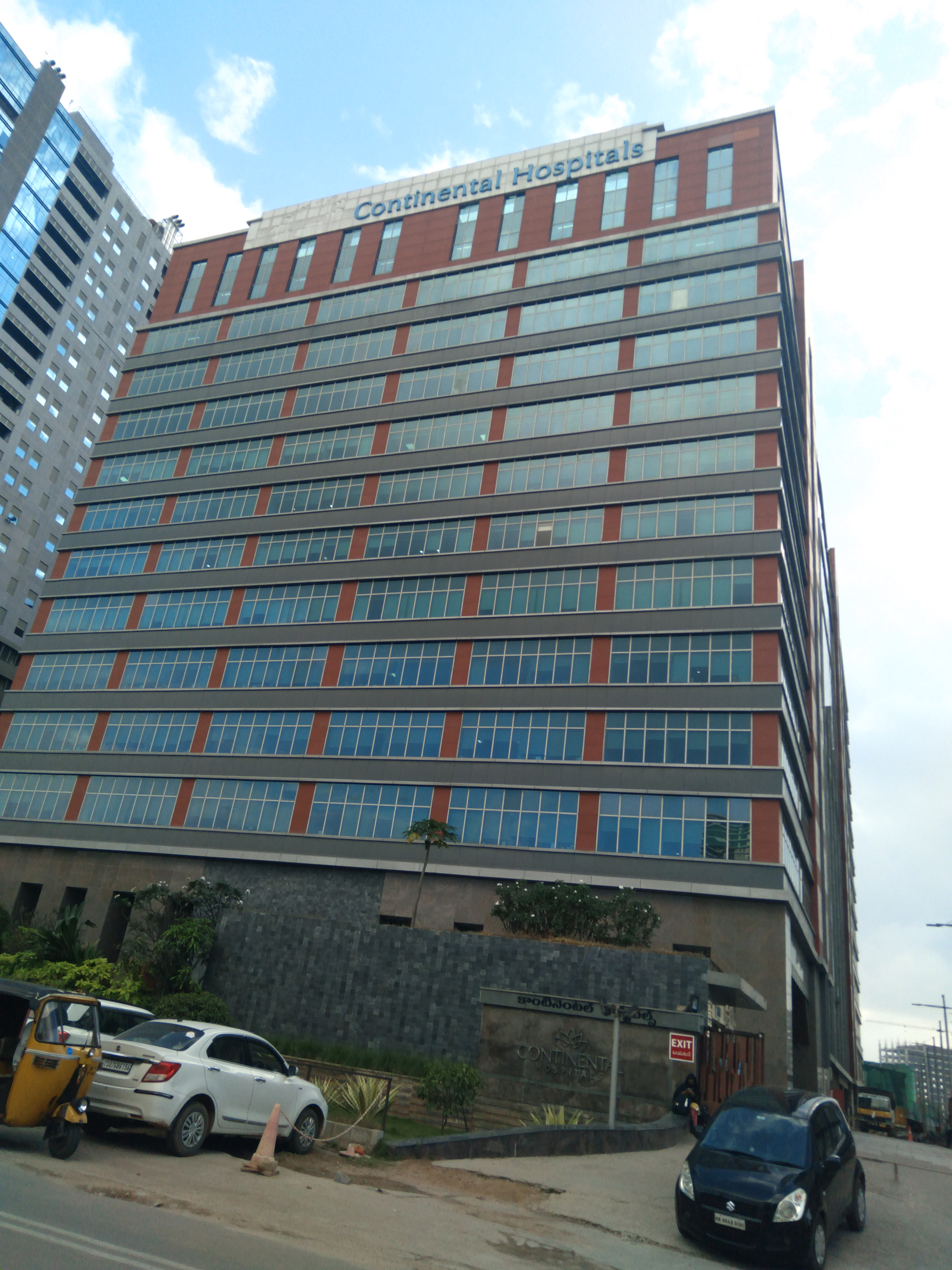
Continental Hospital Financial District

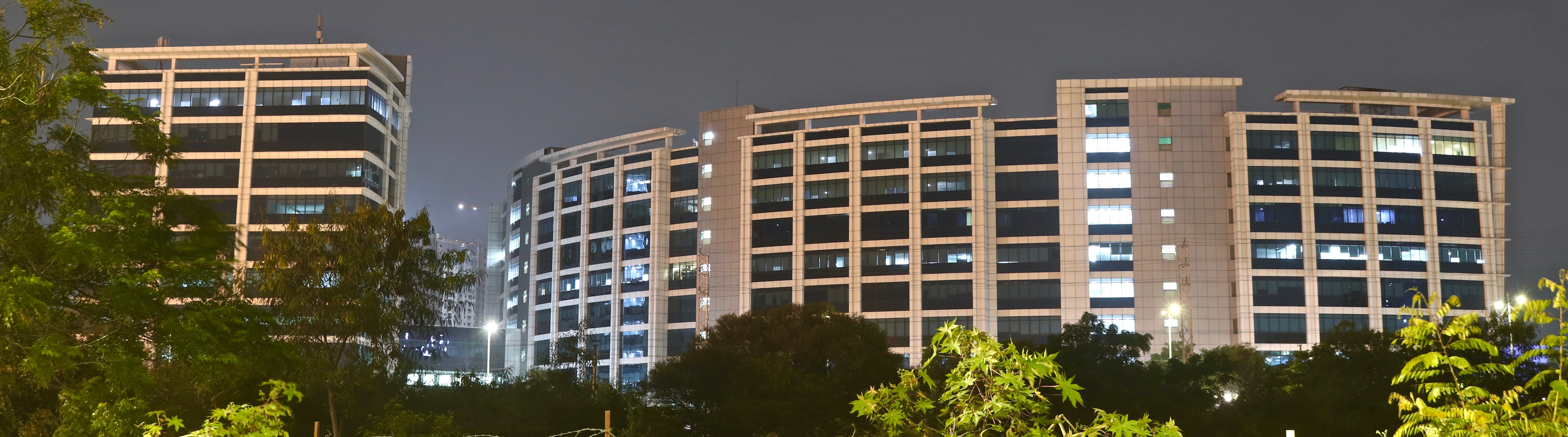
Q-city

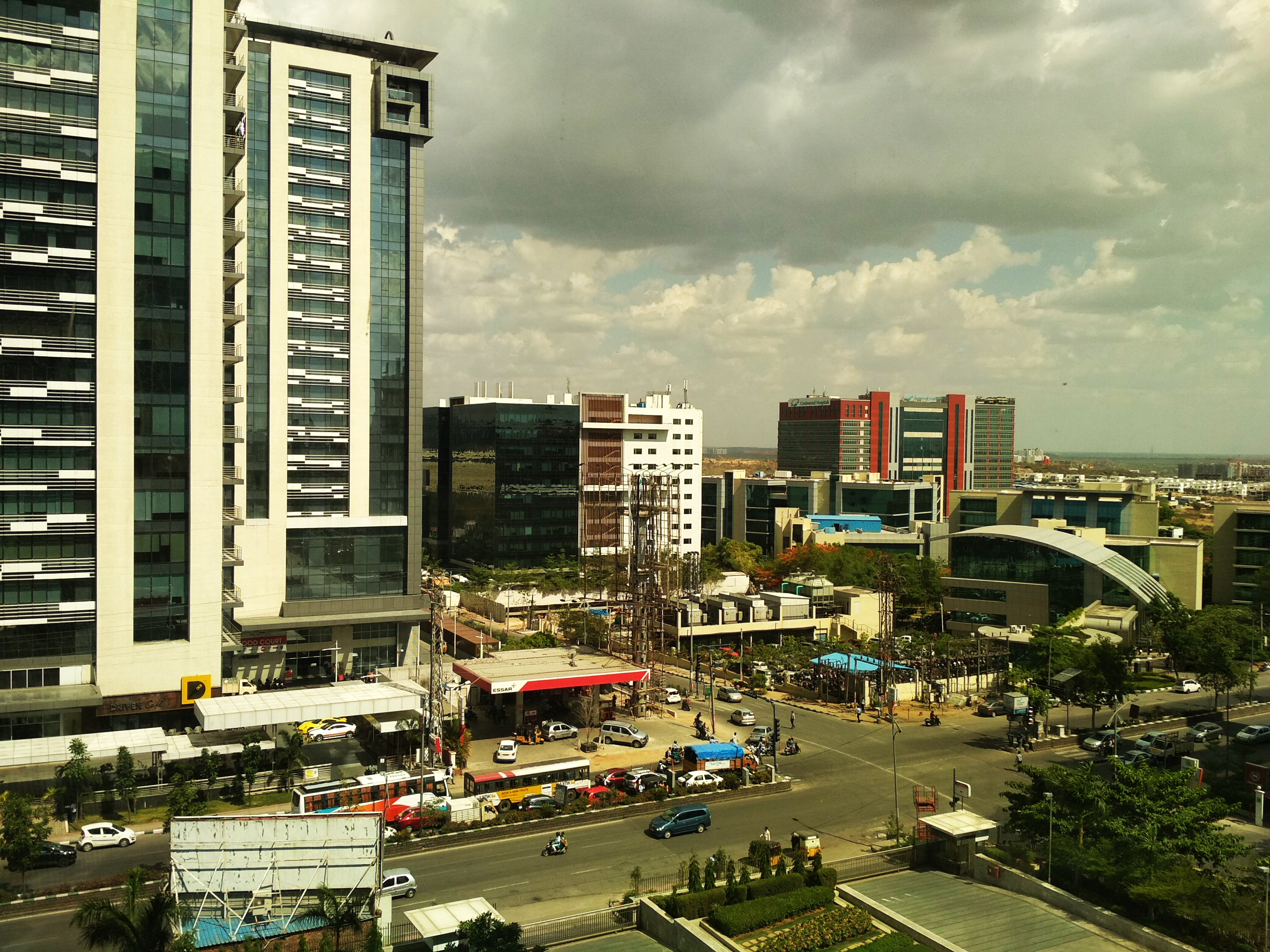
view from ICICI Bank towers

== Healthcare ==
Financial District is an upcoming hub for healthcare. Some of the major healthcare centers have opened branches in this area to cater to large IT crowd. Some of the popular hospitals and healthcare centers are

- Continental Hospitals
- Star Hospitals
- Rainbow Hospital
- Boon IVF & Fertility
- Sankara Eye Hospital
- Medicover Hospitals (Financial District)

== Schools ==
- The Shri Ram Universal School, 2-59/1/JM/104, Financial District Nanakramguda

Then we also have many other schools like keystone close to the Shri ram universal school

== Other sights ==
- Sri Ranganadha swamy temple, Nanakramguda
- Flipside Adventure Park, ISB Rd, Financial District.
- Sunset cinema club-open air cinemas at One Golf Brewery.
- Nanakramguda lake, popularly called Wipro lake.

== See also ==
- Telangana State Industrial Infrastructure Corporation
- Bangalore Central Business District
- Gowlidoddy
- Gopanpally
- Genome Valley
- GIFT City
- Hyderabad Pharma City
