= Gandipet =

- Village
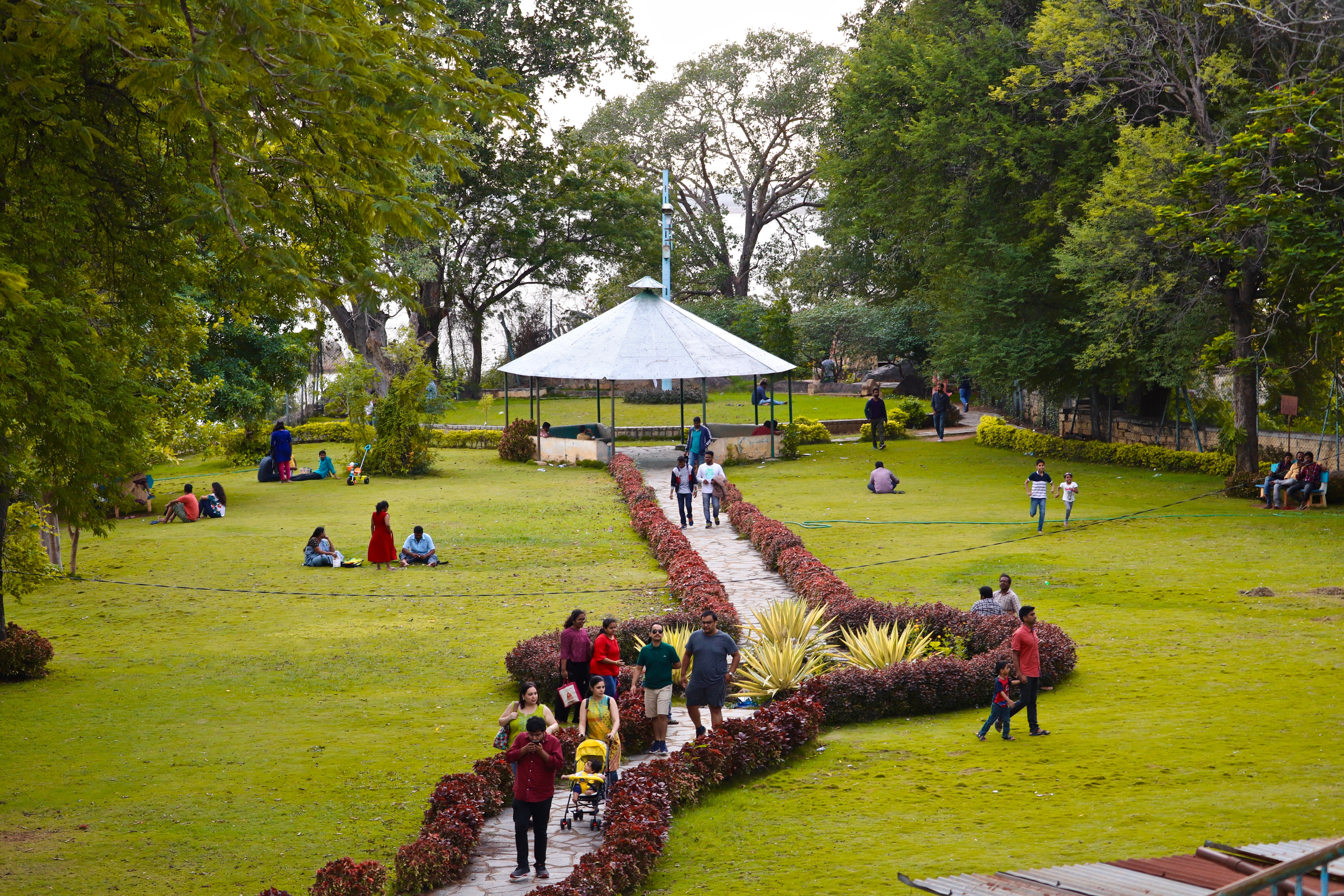
- Park adjacent to Osman Sagar at Gandipet

- Location in Hyderabad Gandipet (India)
- Country: India
- State: Telangana,
- District: Ranga Reddy

Languages
  - Official: Telugu, Urdu
- Time zone: UTC+5:30 (IST)
- PIN: 500075
- Vehicle registration: TS-07

Gandipet is a village in Ranga Reddy district of the Indian state of Telangana. It is located in Gandipet Mandal of Rajendranagar Revenue Division. Chaitanya Bharathi Institute of Technology is located in Gandipet.

The main attraction in Gandipet is Gandipet Eco Park, which was inaugurated by Telangana IT Minister Kalvakuntla Taraka Rama Rao. Another new landscape park at Gandipet on the banks of Hyderabad’s Osman Sagar lake was opened in 2022. GravityZip, India's first Indoor Skydiving Arena in located in Gandipet.
