= List of neighbourhoods in Hyderabad =

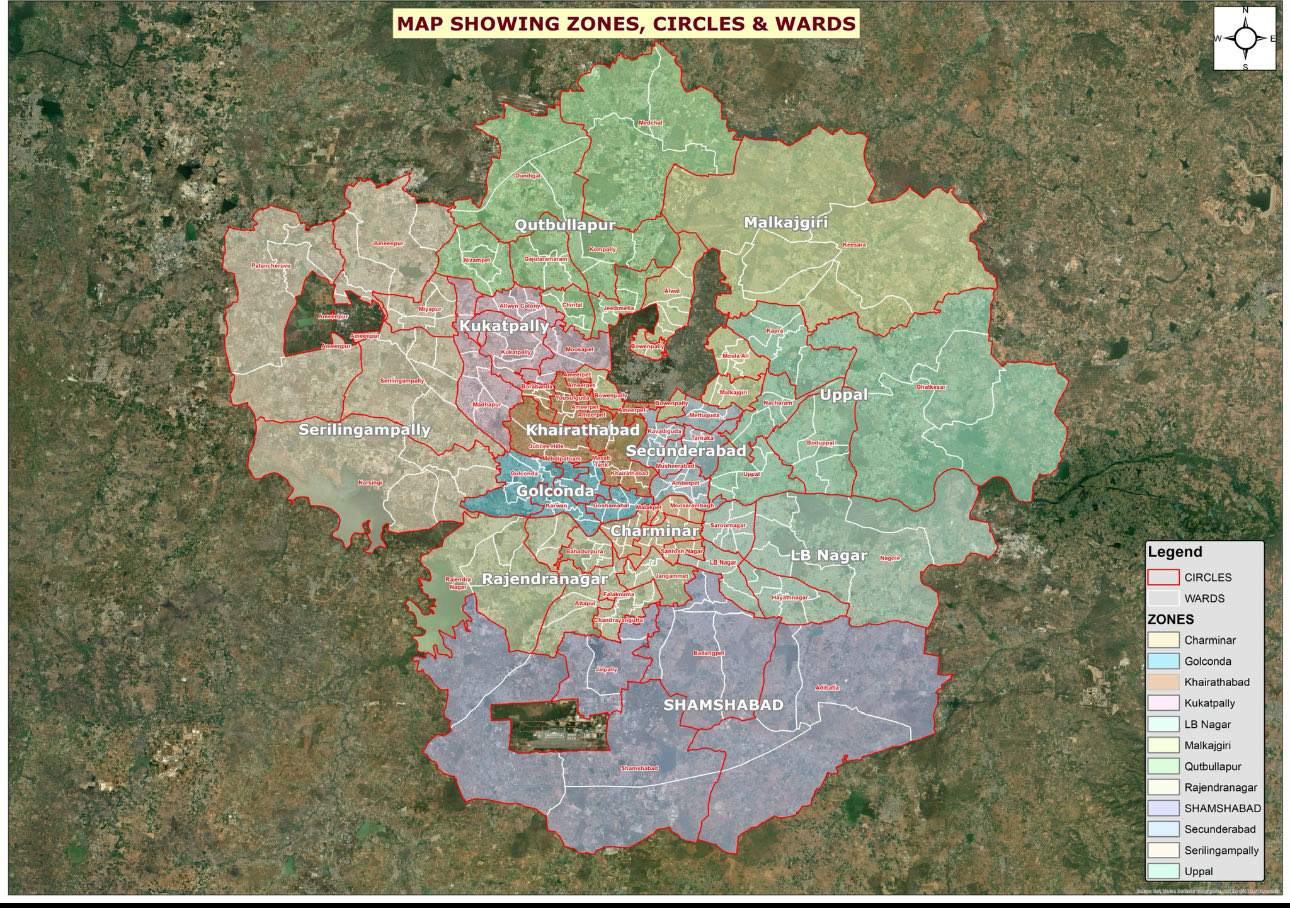
Greater Hyderabad Zones, Circles and Wards 2025

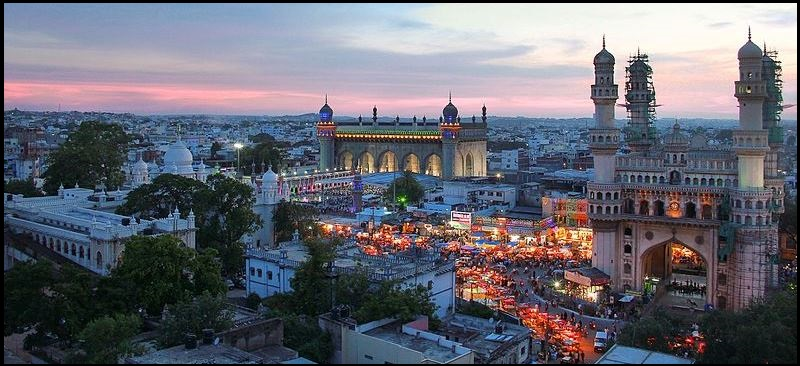
View of Old City, Hyderabad

Hyderabad city is the fourth-most populous city and sixth-most populous urban agglomeration in India. It is spread over four districts of Telangana, namely, Hyderabad, Medchal-Malkajgiri, Ranga Reddy and Sangareddy. The central part of the city (Old MCH Area) forms the commercial, economic and cultural core of the city. The western and north western parts of the city have rapidly grown in recent times, owing to the IT and service sector, while the eastern parts have become residential hubs.

== Central ==
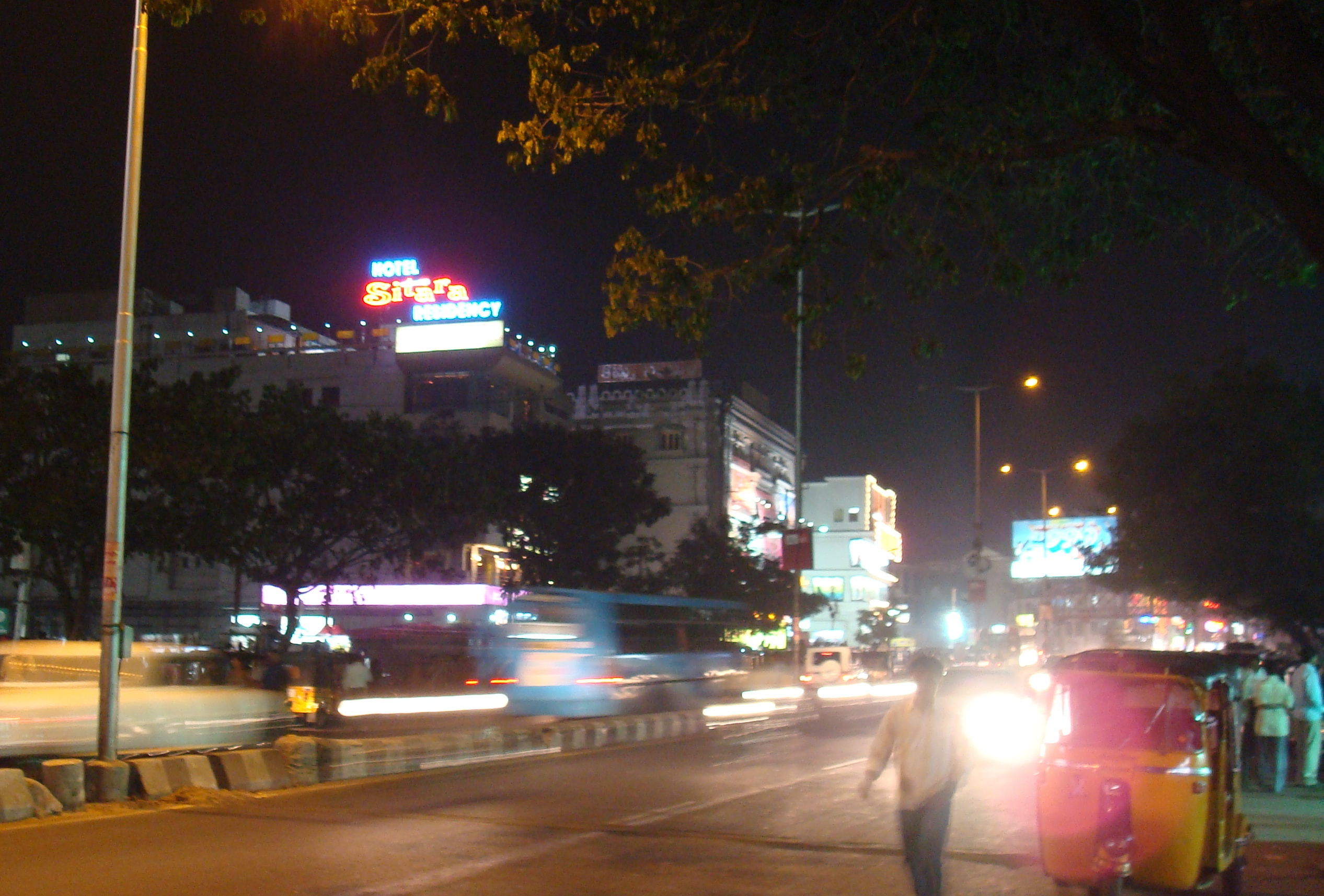
Ameerpet

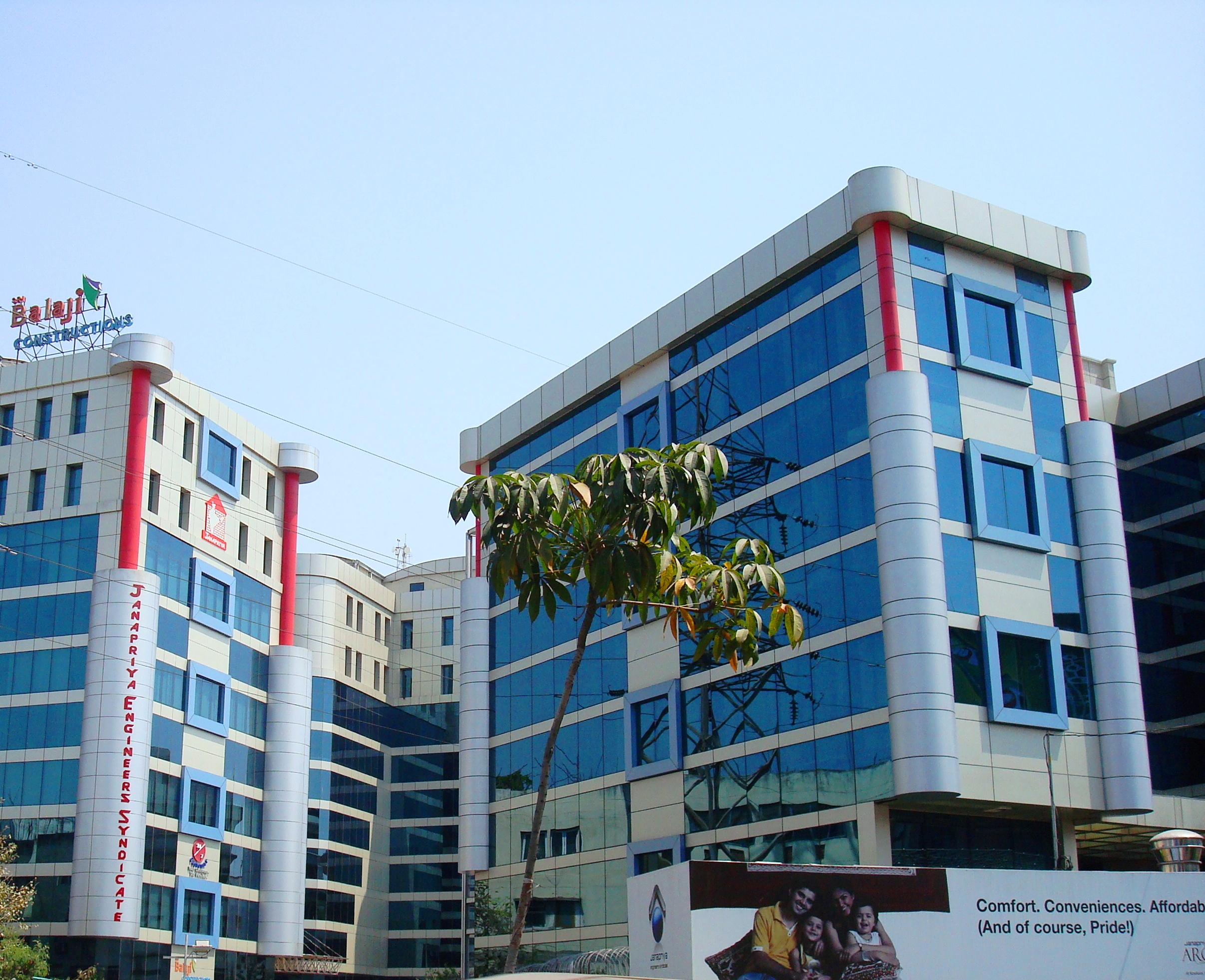
Somajiguda

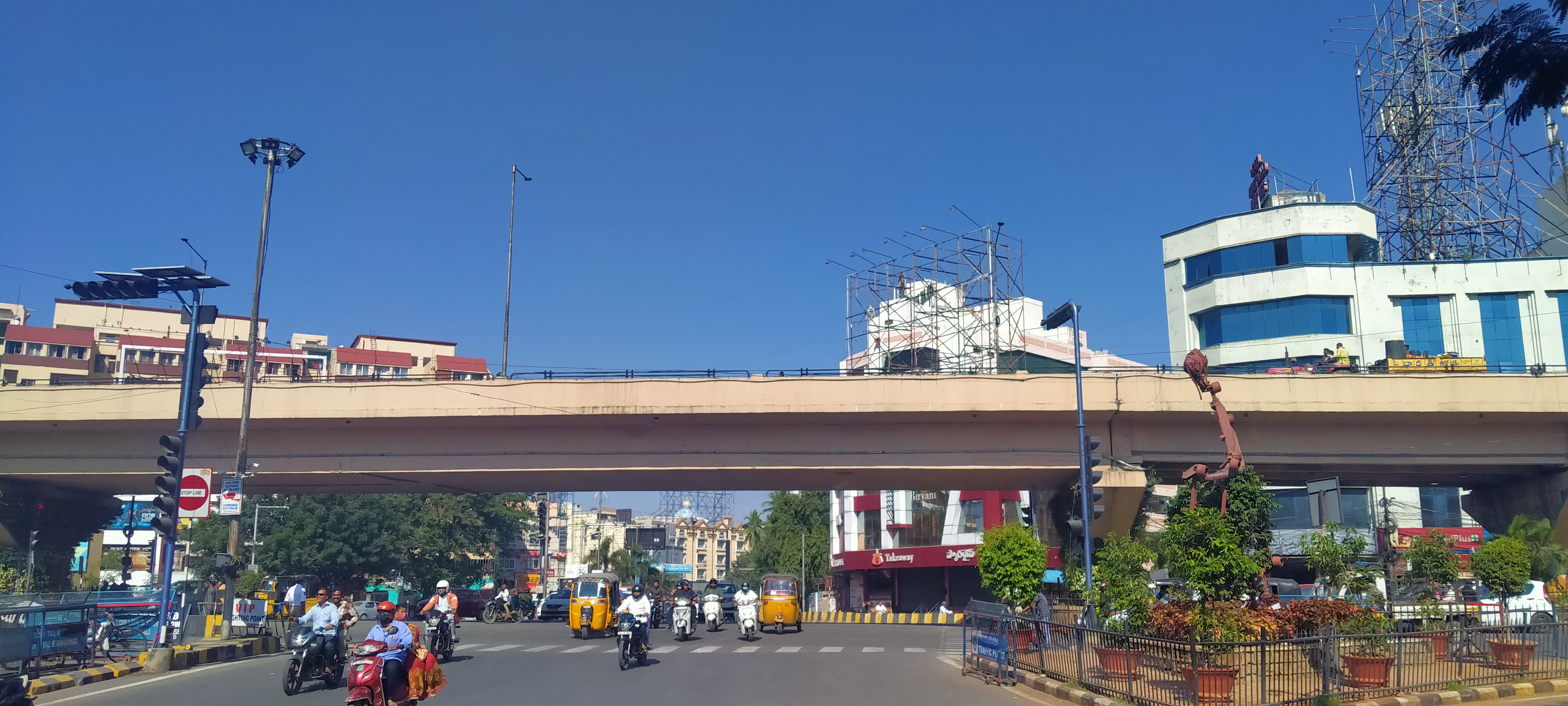
Masab Tank

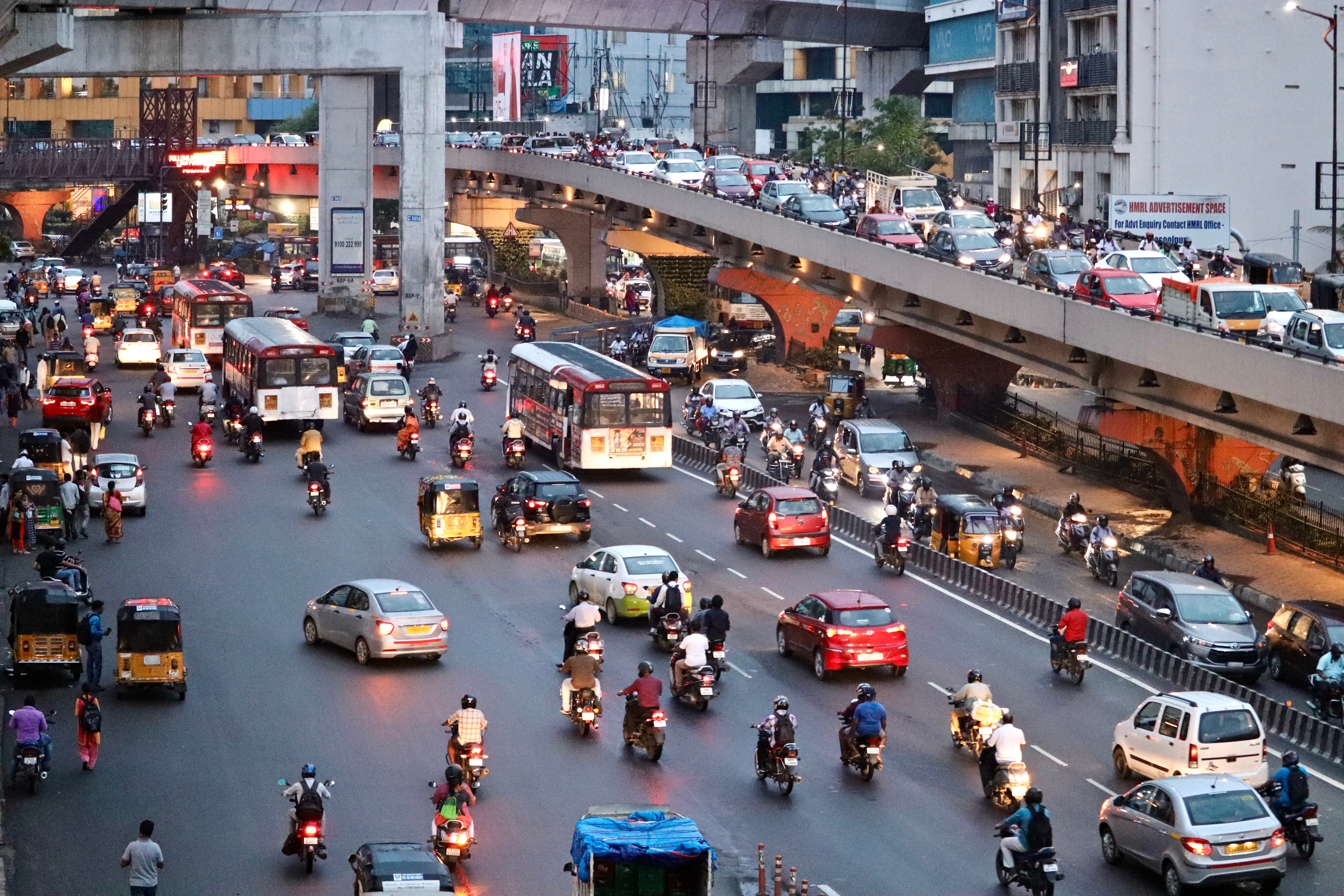
Begumpet

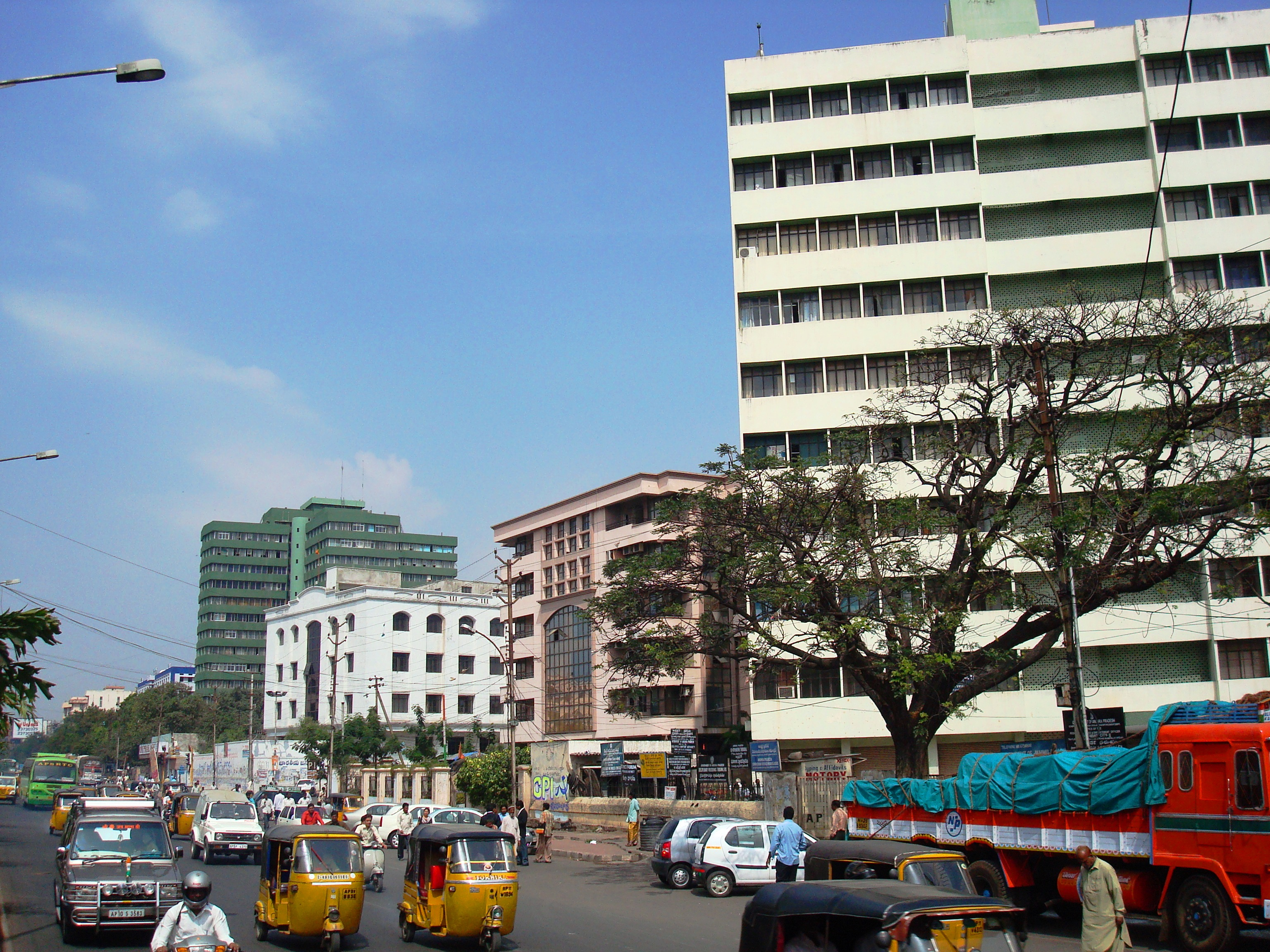
Nampally

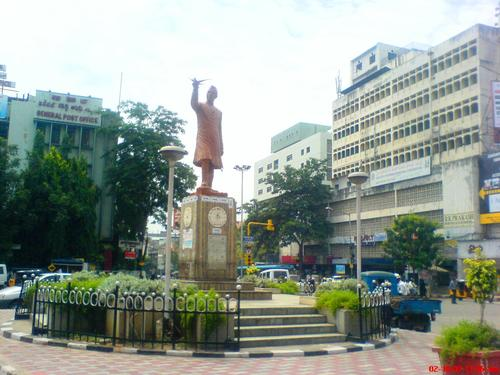
Abids

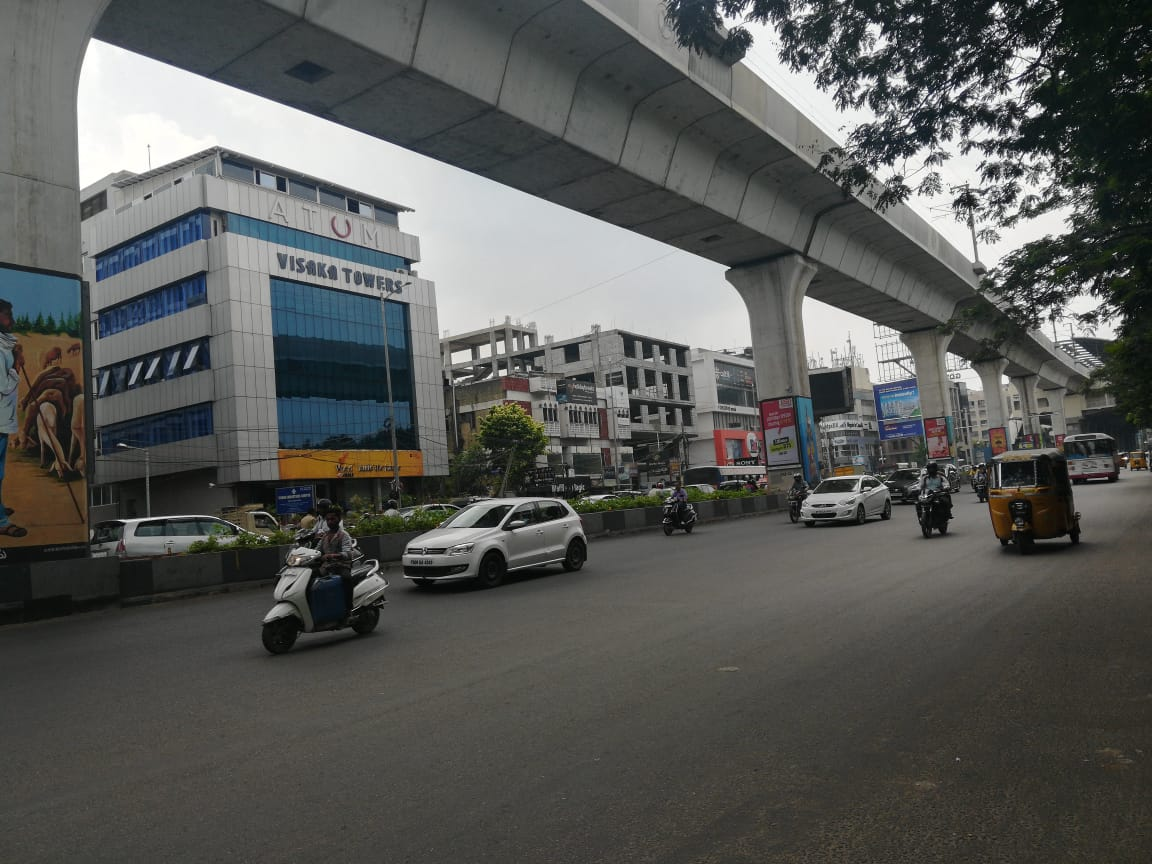
Punjagutta

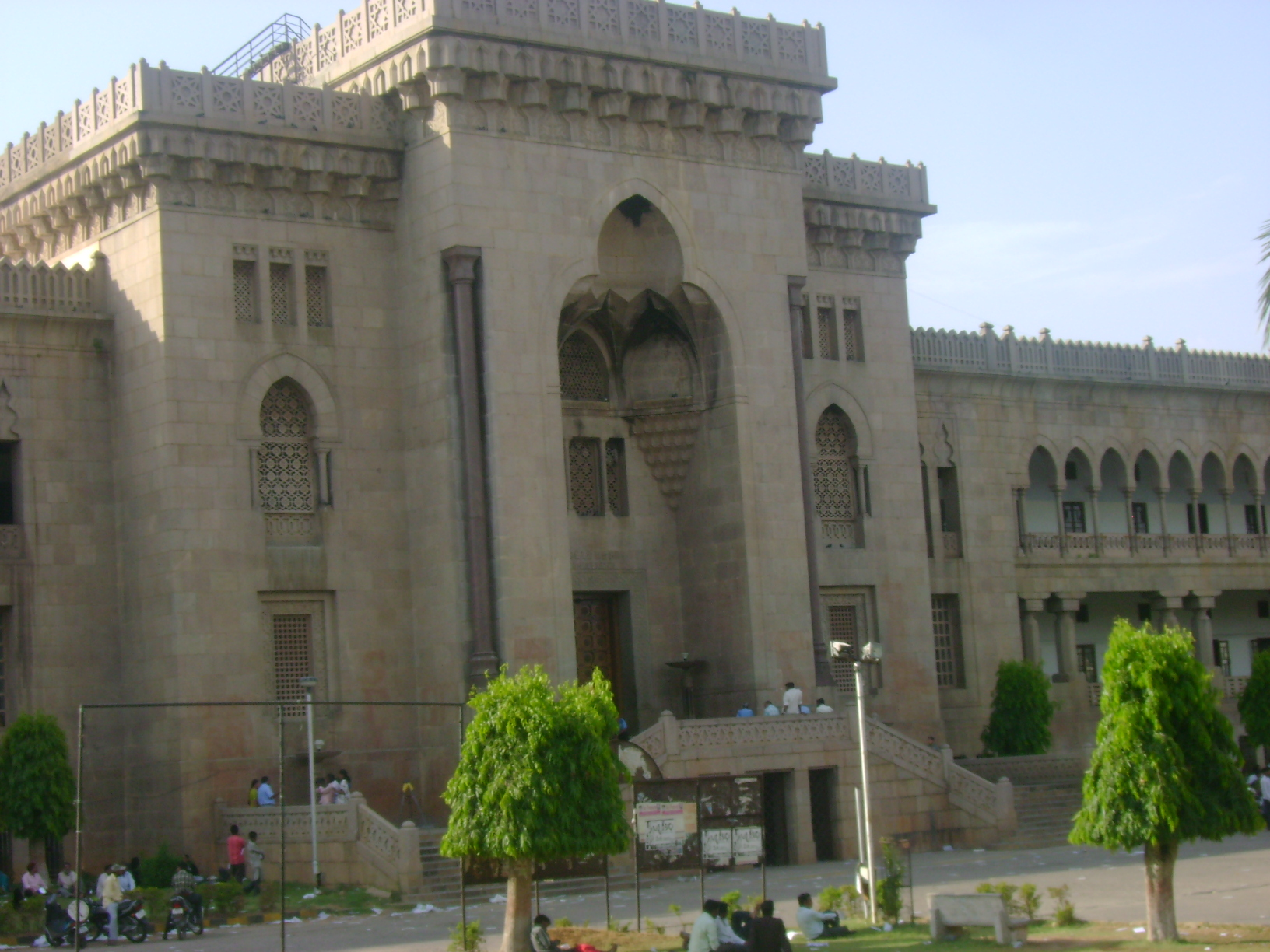
Amberpet

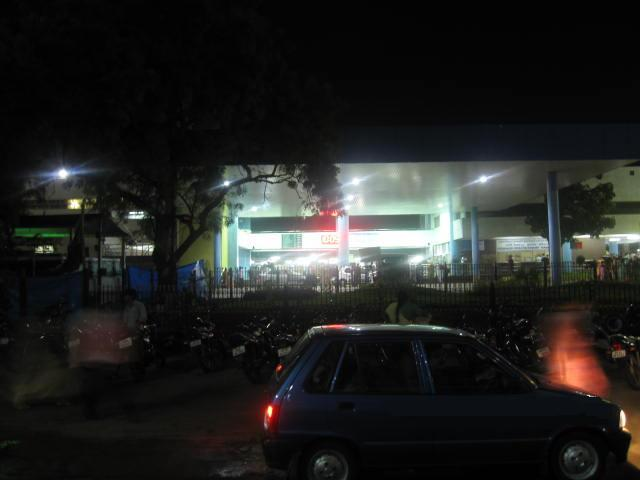
Secunderabad

Hyderabad Central is also called New City, because it was developed after Old City.

=== Ameerpet ===
- Ameerpet
- Begumpet
- SR Nagar
- Prakash Nagar
- Punjagutta
- Balkampet
- Madhura Nagar
- Rasoolpura

=== Sanathnagar ===
- Sanathnagar
- Bharat Nagar
- Erragadda
- Borabanda
- Moti Nagar
- Nehru Nagar

=== Khairatabad ===
- Khairtabad
- Somajiguda
- Raj Bhavan Road
- Lakdikapool
- Saifabad
- A.C. Guards
- Masab Tank
- Chintal Basti

=== Musheerabad ===
- Musheerabad
- Chikkadpally
- Himayatnagar
- Ashok Nagar
- Domalguda
- Hyderguda
- Ramnagar
- Azamabad
- Adikmet
- Nallakunta
- Shanker Mutt
- RTC X Roads
- Vidyanagar
- Narayanguda
- Durgabai Deshmukh Colony
- Central Excise Colony

=== Amberpet ===
- Amberpet
- Tilaknagar
- Golnaka
- Barkatpura
- Shivam Road
- Jamia Osmania
- Kachiguda
- Badichowdi

=== Nampally ===
- Nampally
- Abids
- Aghapura
- Koti
- Bank Street
- Boggulkunta
- Mehdipatnam
- Karwan

=== Secunderabad ===
- Secunderabad
- Chilkalguda
- Kavadiguda
- MG Road (James Street)
- Minister Road
- Mylargadda
- Namalagundu
- Padmarao Nagar
- Pan bazar
- Paradise Circle
- Parsigutta
- Patny
- Rani Gunj
- RP Road
- Sindhi Colony
- Sitaphalmandi
- Tarnaka
- Warsiguda
- Addagutta
- Tukaramgate
- Kalasiguda

=== Secunderabad Cantonment ===
- Secunderabad Cantonment
- Bowenpally
- Karkhana
- Marredpally
- Sikh Village
- Trimulgherry
- Vikrampuri

== Western ==
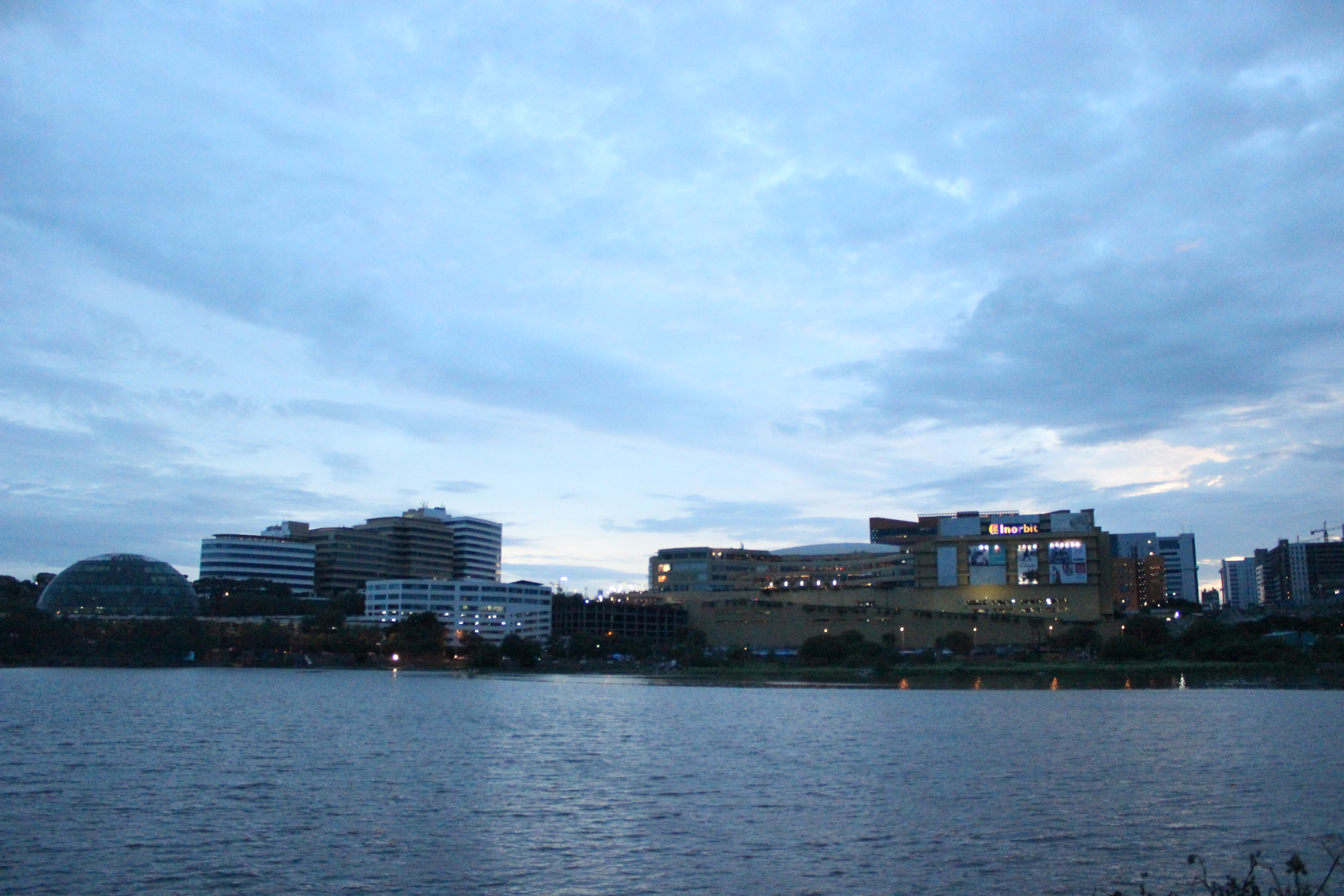
HITEC City

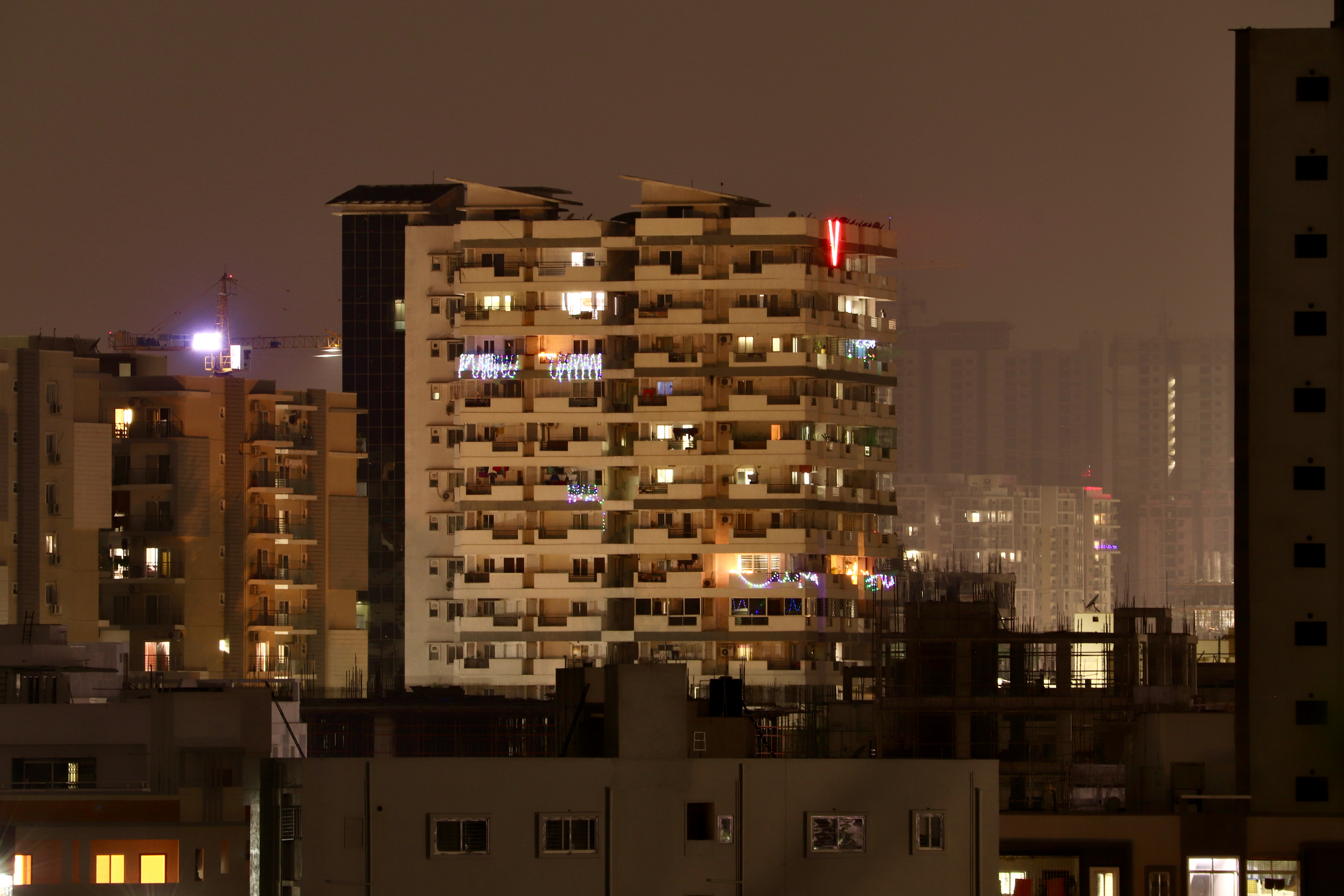
Manikonda

=== Financial District ===
- Gachibowli
- Gowlidoddi
- Nanakramguda

=== HITEC City ===
- HITEC City
- Madhapur
- Kondapur
- Kothaguda
- Kokapet
- Narsingi

=== Jubilee Hills ===
- Jubilee Hills
- Banjara Hills
- Film Nagar
- Yousufguda
- Srinagar colony

== North Western ==
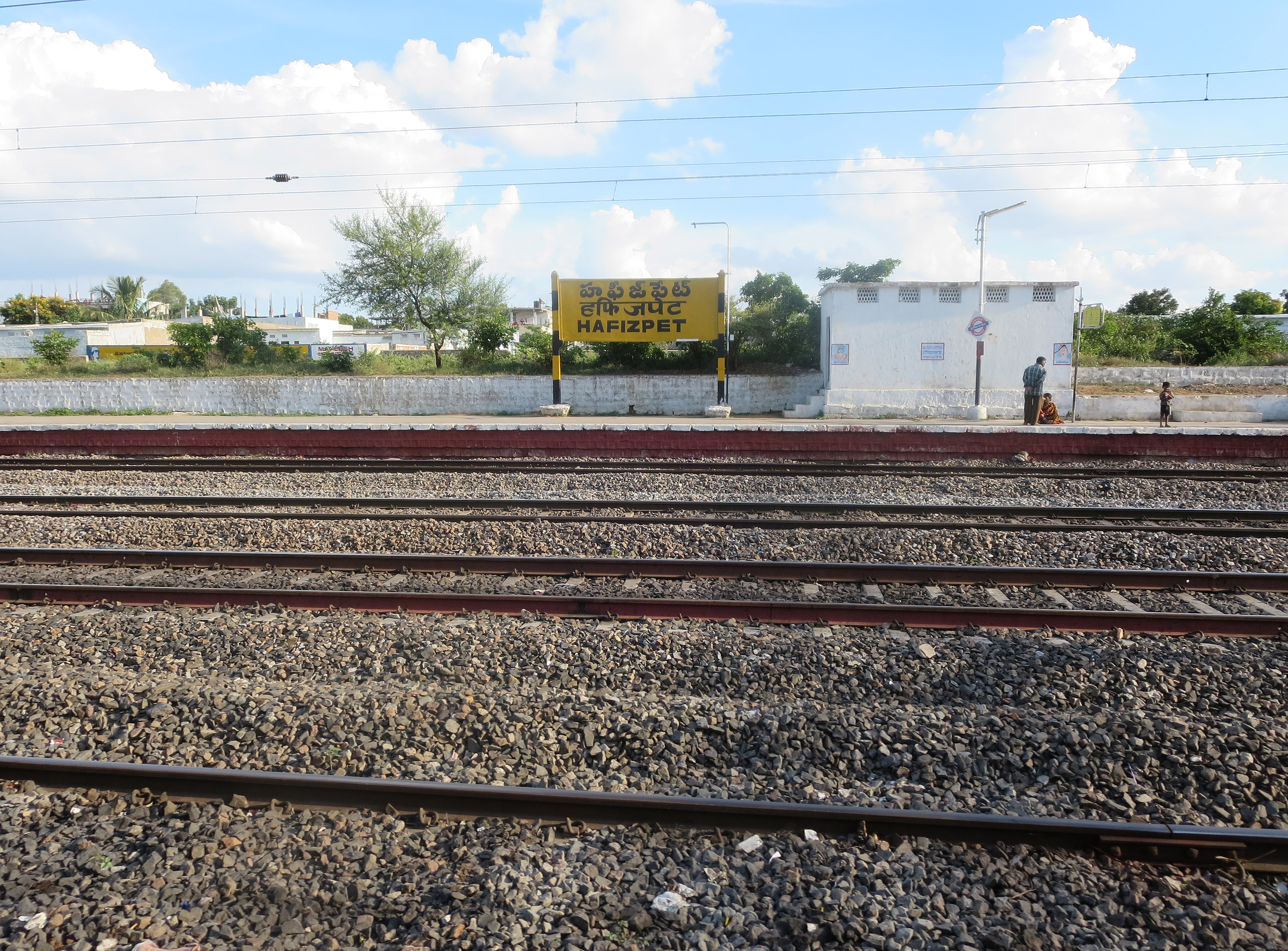
Hafeezpet

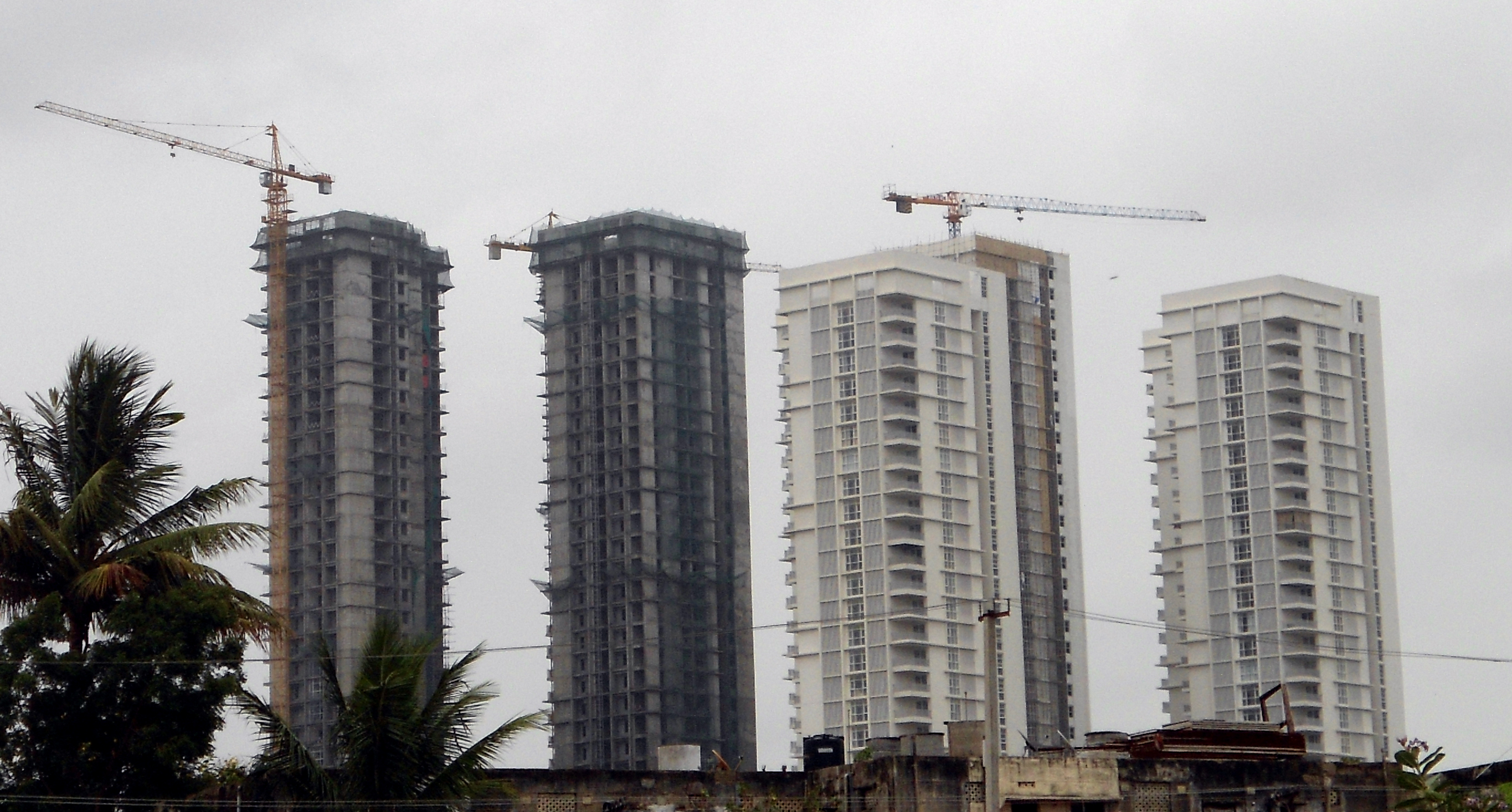
Kukatpally

=== Serilingampally ===
- Serilingampally
- Chanda Nagar
- Allwyn Colony
- Hafeezpet
- Madinaguda
- Miyapur
- Maktha Mahaboobpet

=== Kukatpally ===
- Kukatpally
- Allwyn Colony
- Bachupally
- KPHB Colony
- Nizampet
- Pragathi Nagar
- Moosapet
- Mallampet

=== Patancheru ===
- Patancheru
- BHEL Township
- RC Puram
- Ameenpur
- Beeramguda
- Kistareddypet
- IDA Bollaram
- Medical Devices Park

== Old City ==
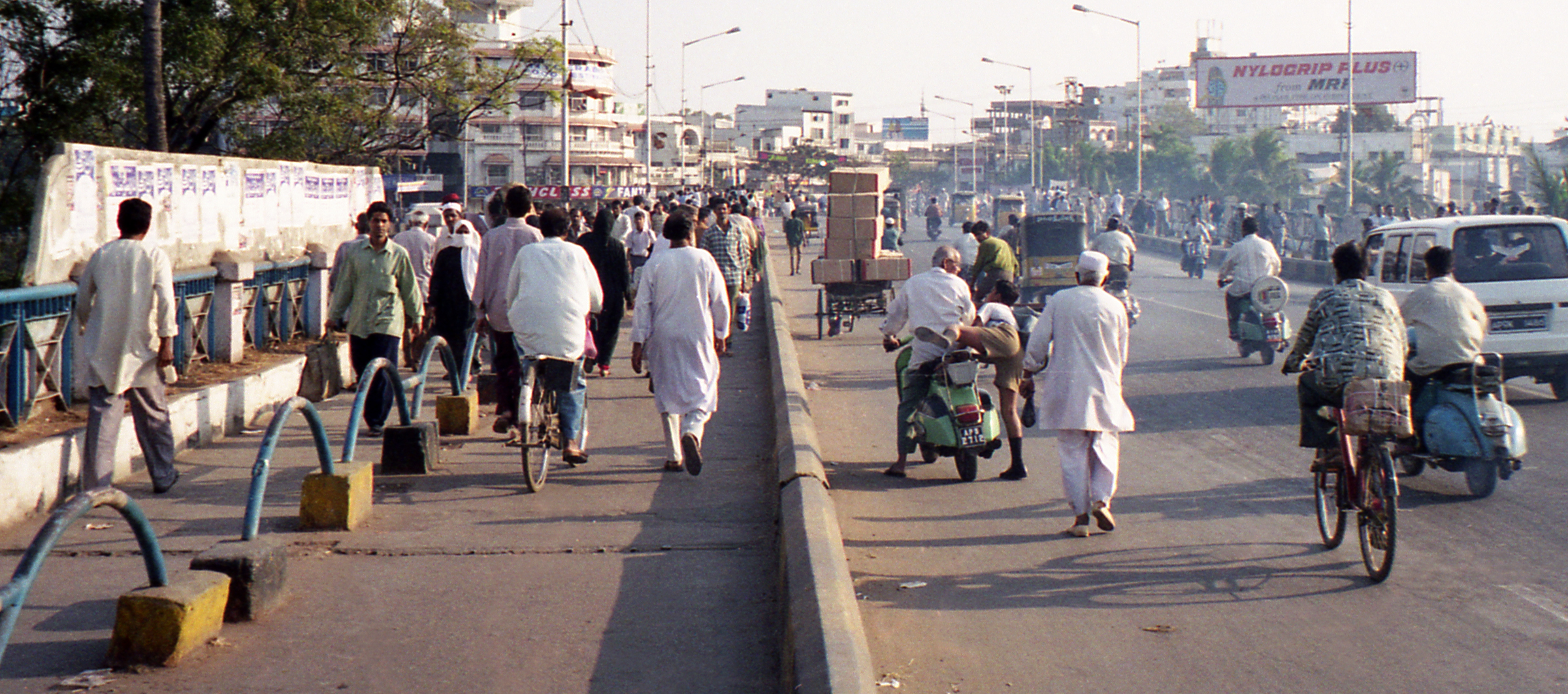
Afzal Gunj

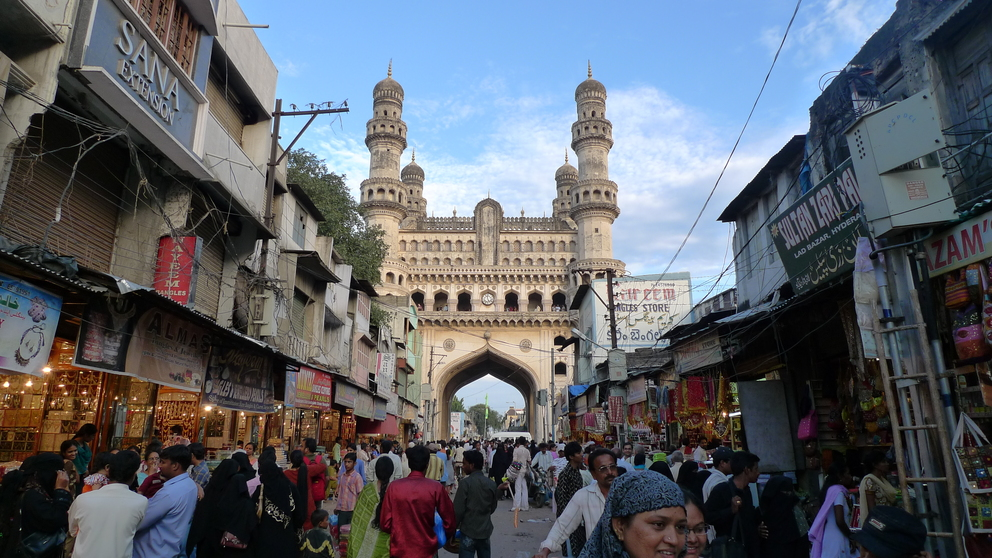
Laad Bazaar

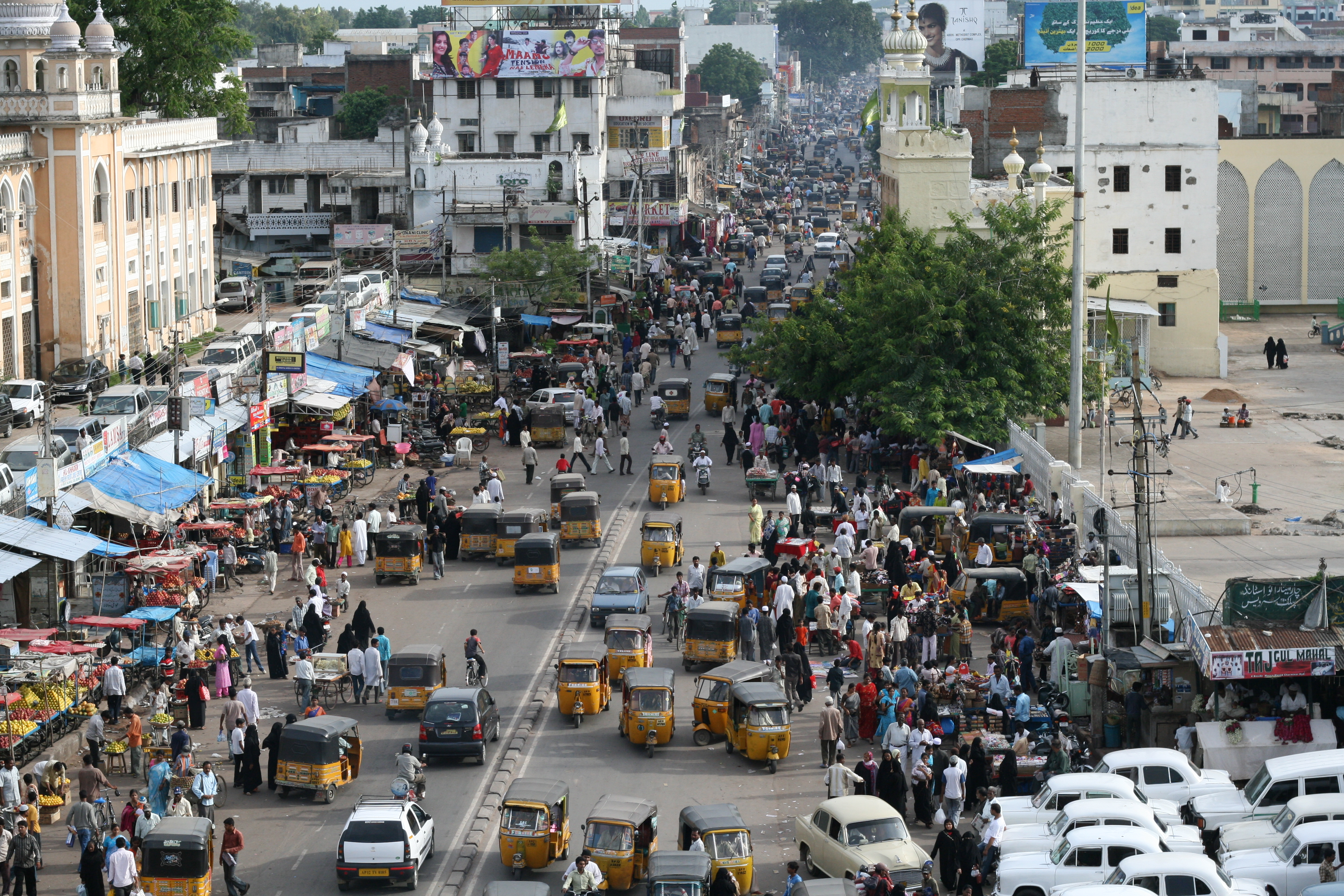
Old City

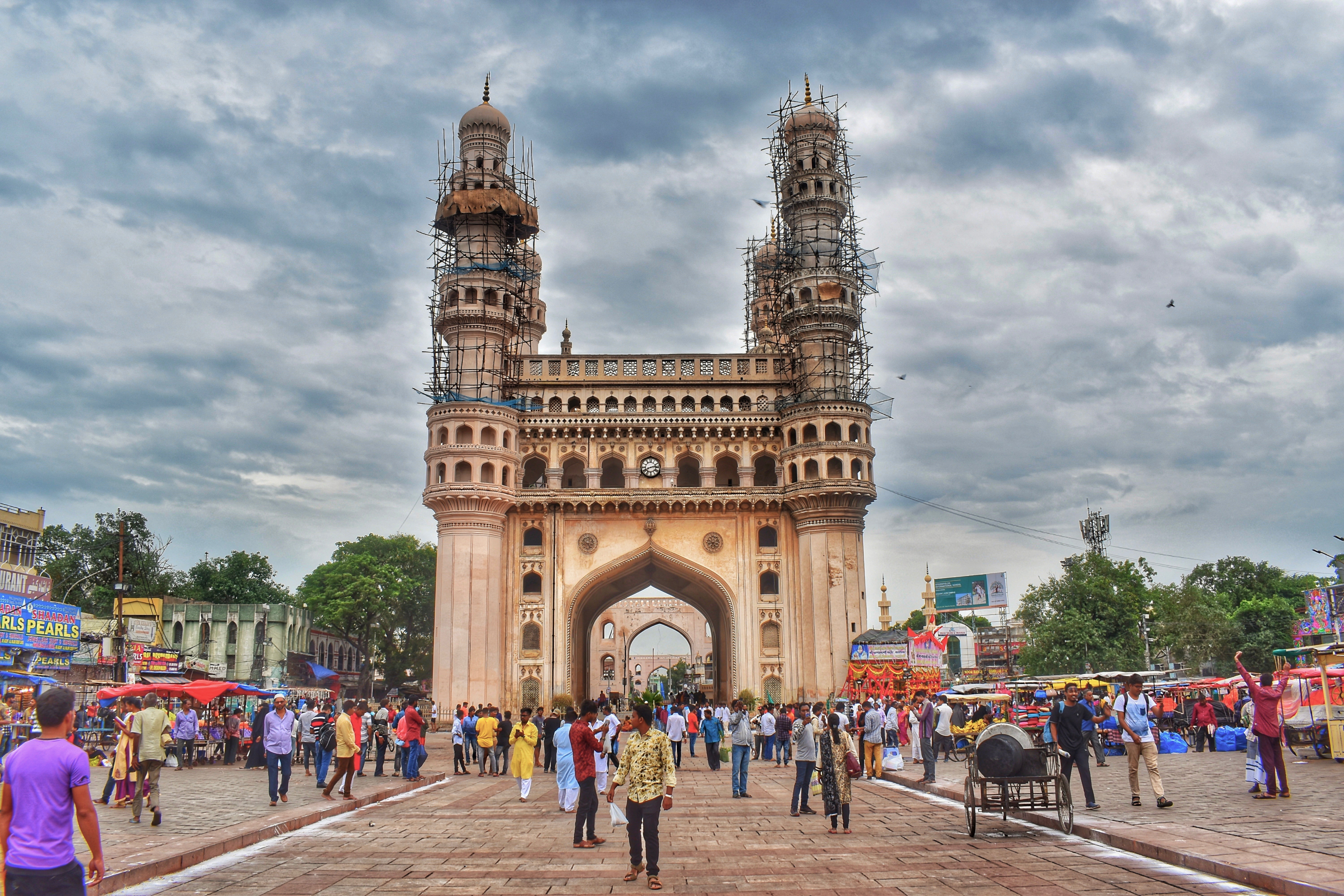
Charminar

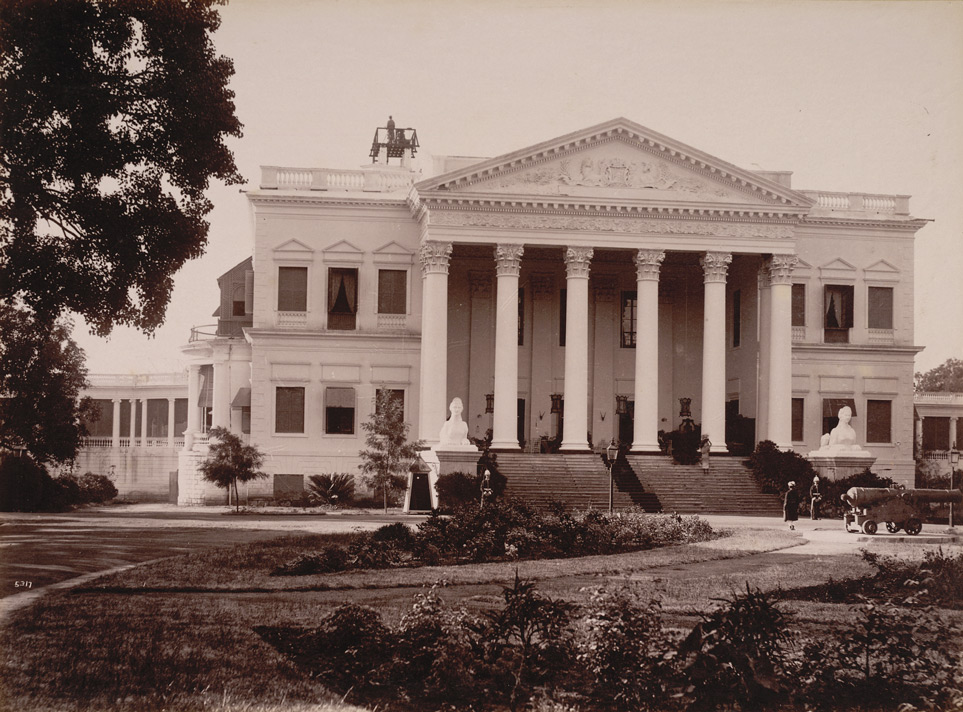
Chaderghat

- Afzal Gunj
- Aliabad
- Alijah Kotla
- Asif Nagar
- Azampura
- Barkas
- Bazarghat
- Begum Bazaar
- Chaderghat
- Chanchalguda
- Chandrayan Gutta
- Chatta Bazaar
- Dabirpura
- Dar-ul-Shifa
- Dhoolpet
- Edi Bazar
- Falaknuma
- Karwan
- Malakpet
- Moghalpura
- Jahanuma
- Laad Bazaar
- Lal Darwaza
- Langar Houz
- Madina
- Maharajgunj
- Mehboob ki Mehendi
- Mir Alam Tank
- Mozamjahi Market
- Nawab Saheb Kunta
- Nayapul
- Noorkhan Bazar
- Pisal Banda
- Purana pul
- Putlibowli
- Rein Bazar
- Santoshnagar
- Shahran Market
- Shah Ali Banda
- Sultan Bazar
- Udden Gadda
- Uppuguda
- Yakutpura
- Moin Bagh
- Riyasat Nagar

== Northern ==
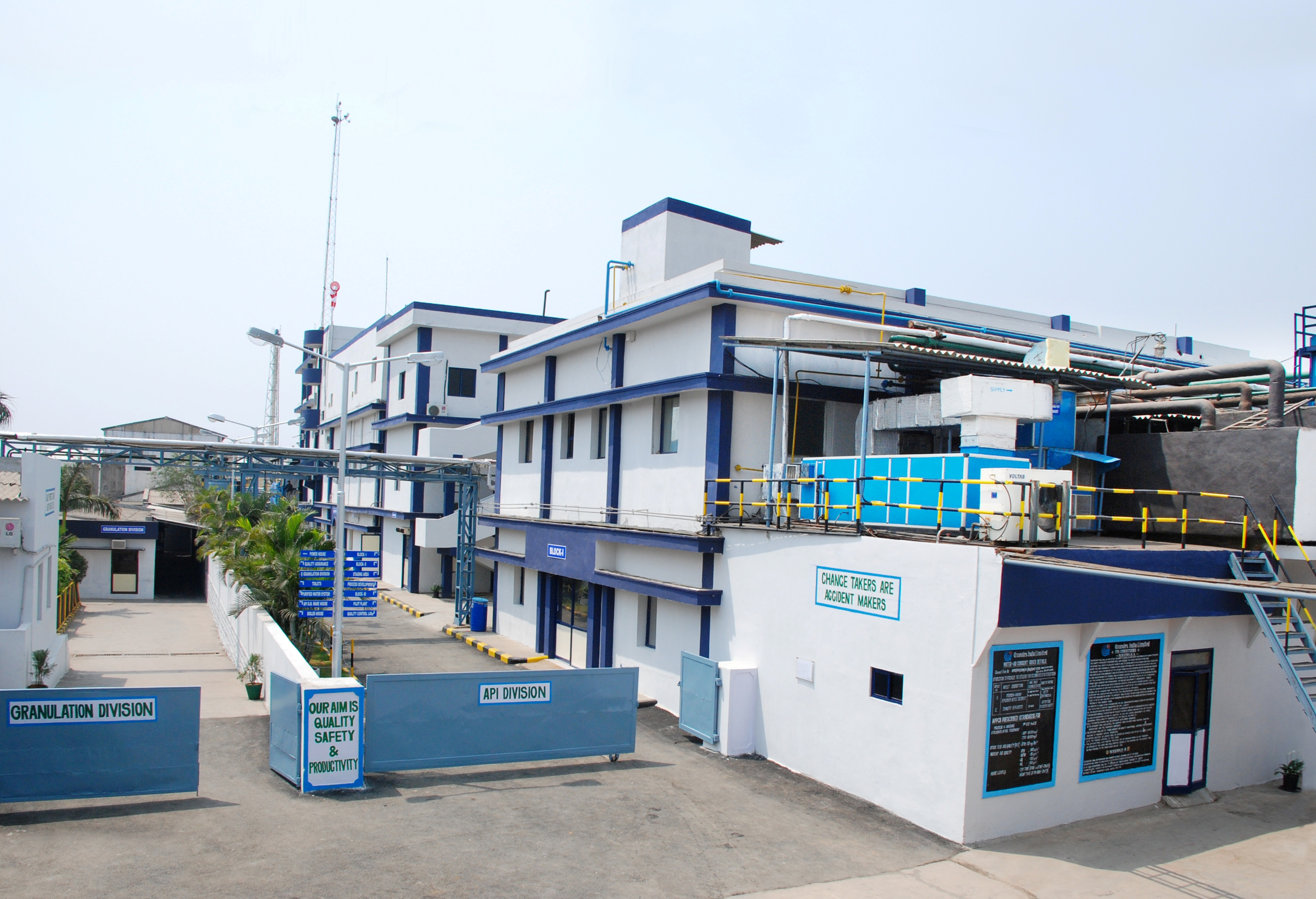
Jeedimetla

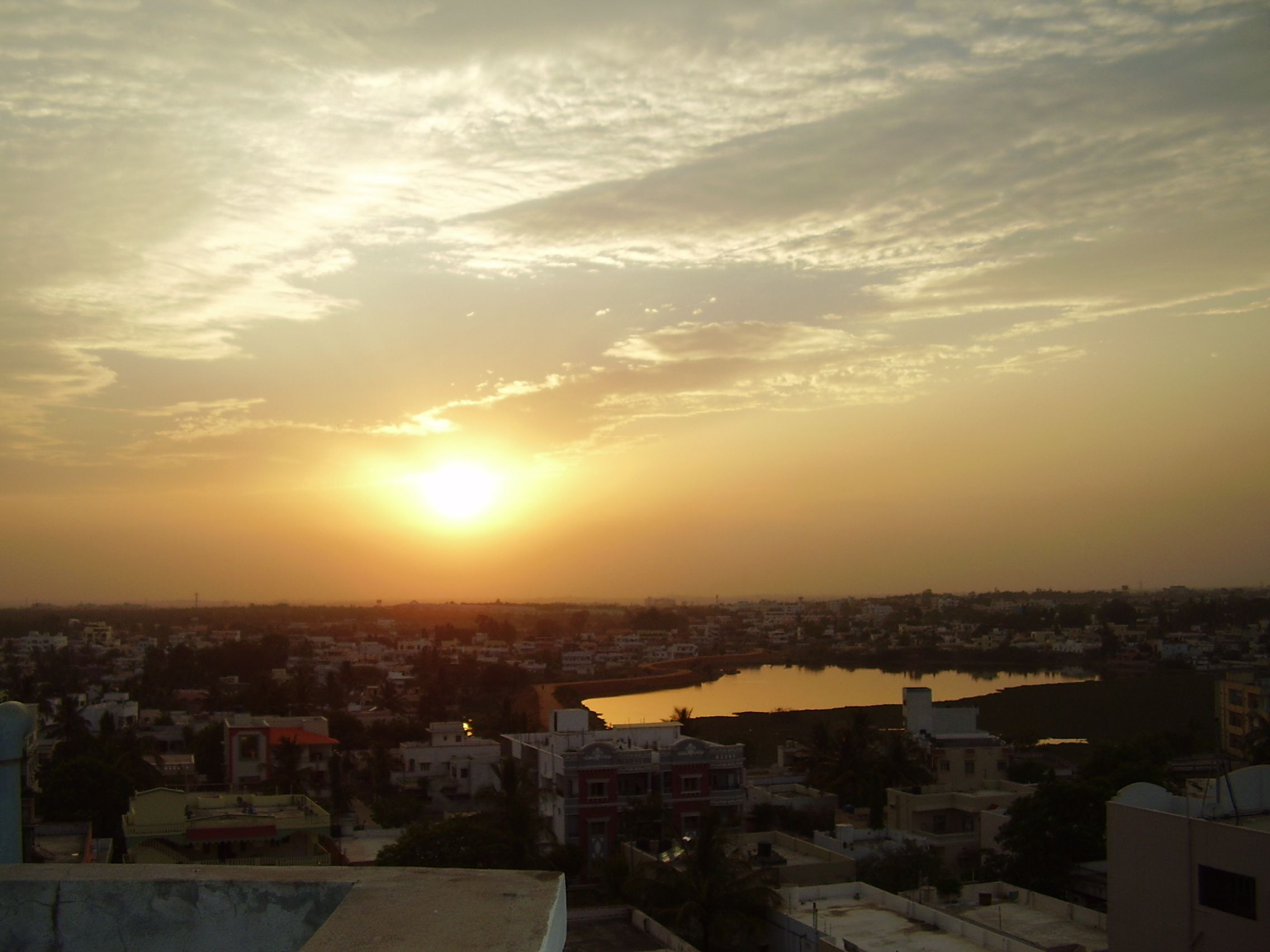
Old Alwal, Alwal

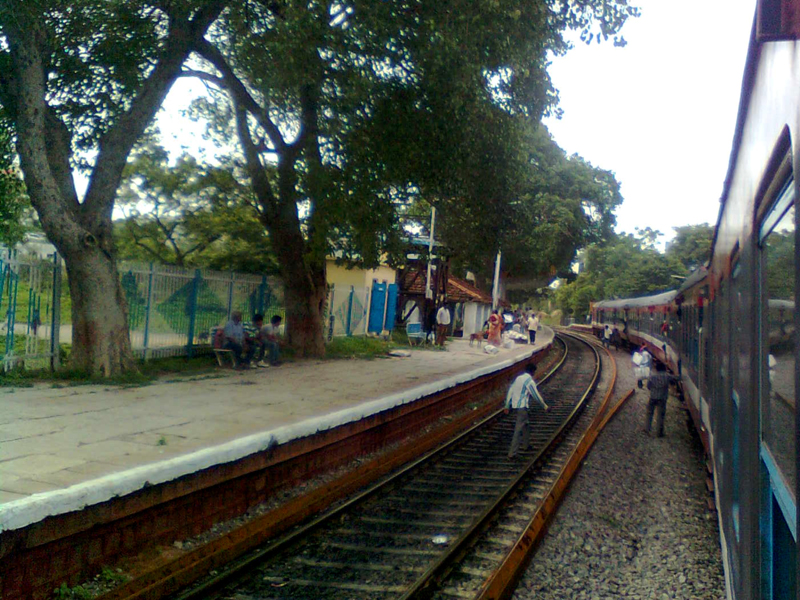
Alwal

=== Balanagar ===
- Balanagar
- Fateh Nagar
- Ferozguda
- Old Bowenpally
- Hasmathpet
- Suchitra Center

=== Qutbullapur ===
- Quthbullapur
- Jeedimetla
- Jagadgirigutta
- Suraram
- Pet Basheerabad

=== Medchal ===
- Kompally
- Maisammaguda
- Medchal
- Kandlakoya

=== Alwal ===
- Alwal
- Lothkunta
- Old Alwal
- Macha Bollaram
- Venkatapuram
- Shamirpet

== North Eastern ==
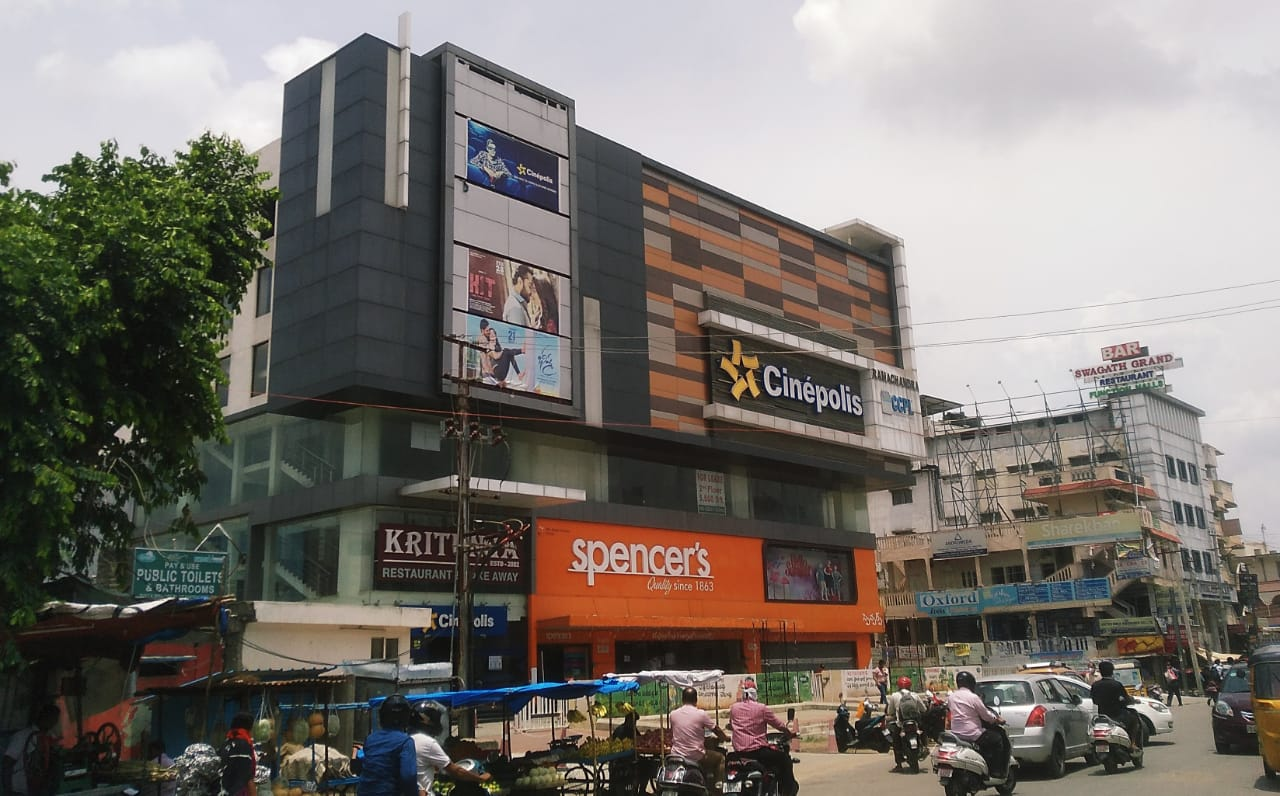
Malkajgiri

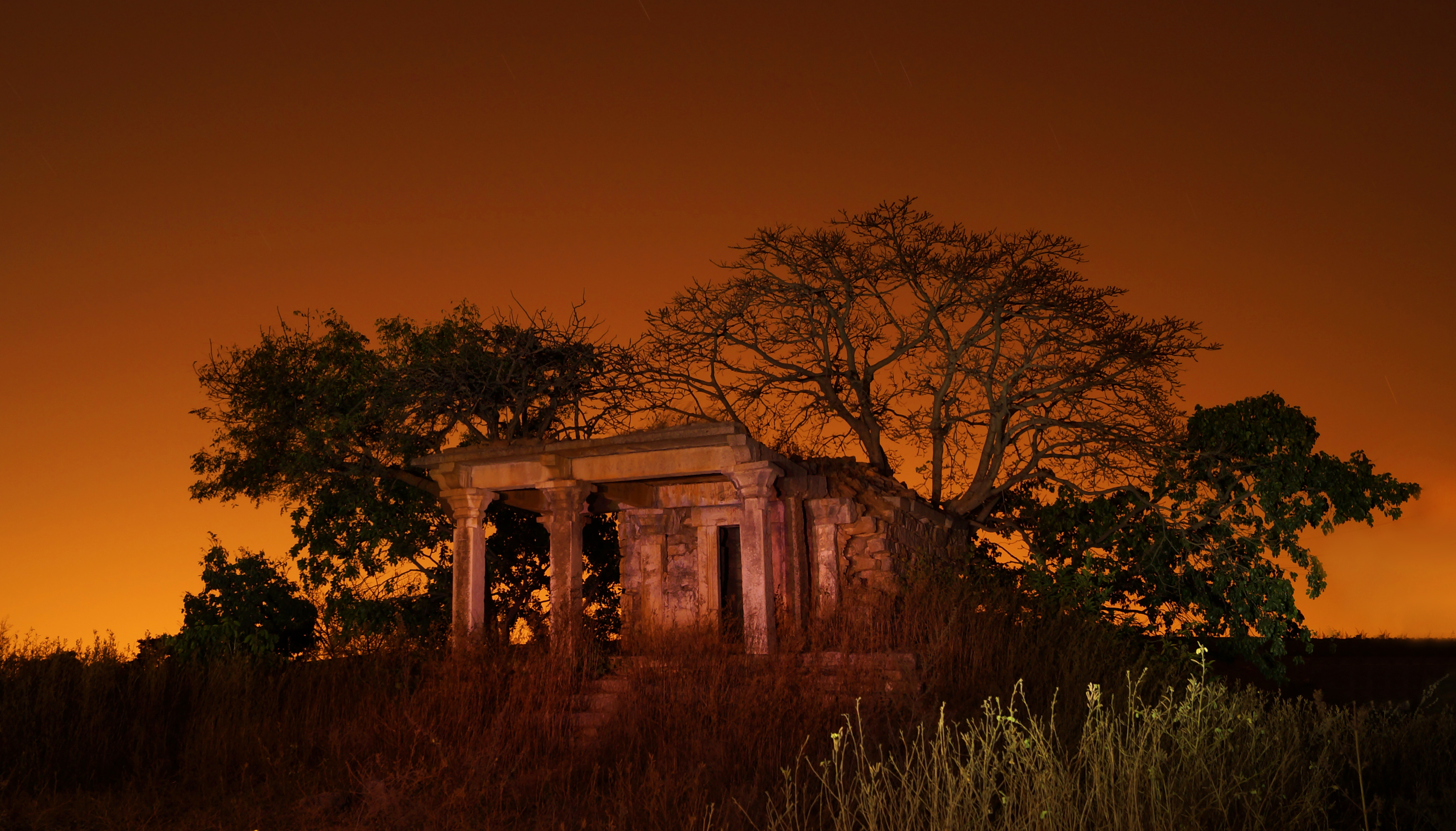
Keesara

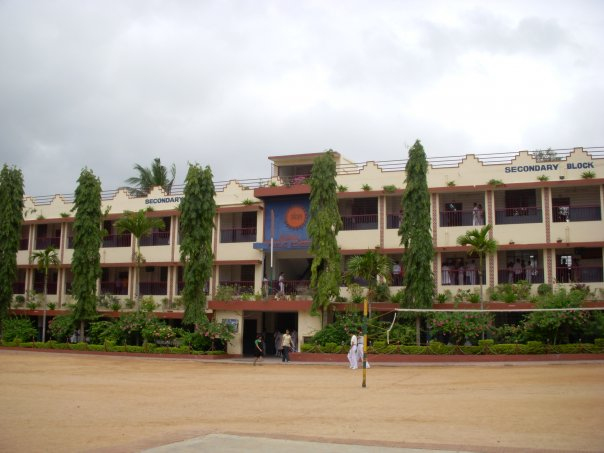
Safilguda

=== Malkajgiri ===
- Malkajgiri
- Anandbagh
- Ammuguda
- Gautham Nagar
- Kakatiya Nagar
- Vinayak Nagar
- Moula-Ali
- Neredmet
- Old Neredmet
- Safilguda
- Sainikpuri
- Yapral

=== Kapra ===
- Kapra
- A. S. Rao Nagar
- ECIL 'X' Roads
- Kamala Nagar
- Kushaiguda
- Cherlapally

=== Keesara ===
- Keesara
- Nagaram
- Dammaiguda
- Jawaharnagar
- Rampally
- Cheriyal

== Eastern ==
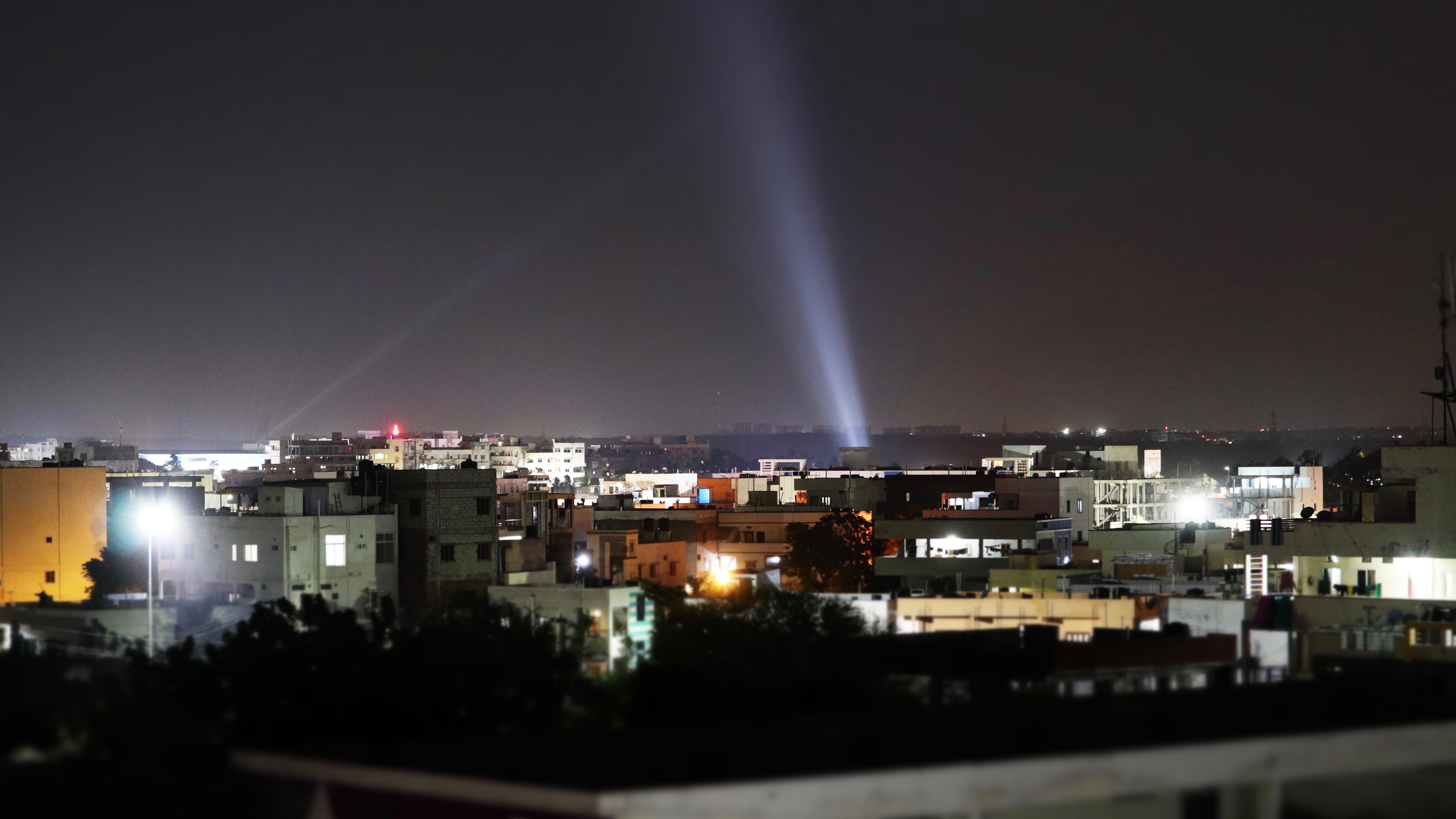
Uppal

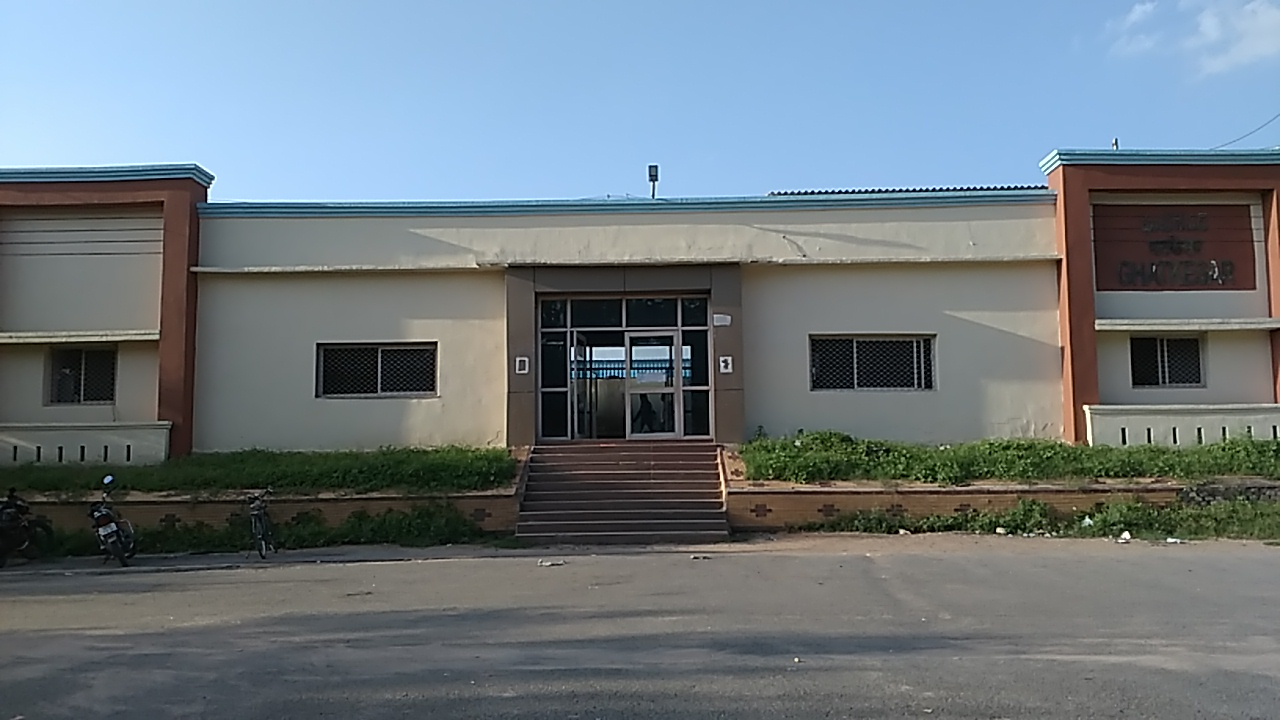
Ghatkesar

=== Uppal ===
- Uppal
- Habsiguda
- Ramanthapur
- Boduppal
- Nagole
- Nacharam
- Mallapur

=== Ghatkesar ===
- Ghatkesar
- Peerzadiguda
- Chengicherla
- Pocharam
- Narapally
- Medipally, Telangana

== South Eastern ==
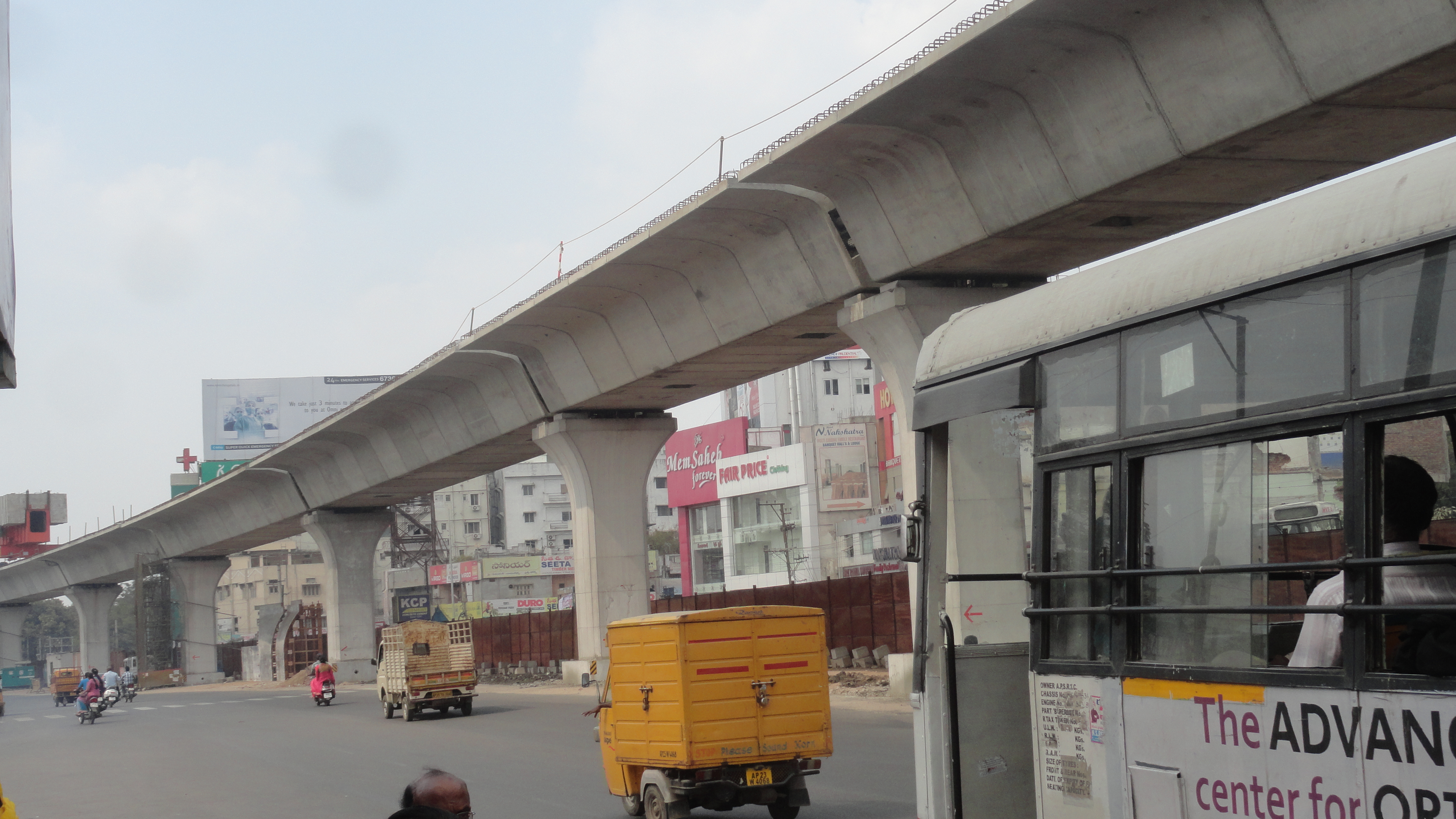
L. B. Nagar

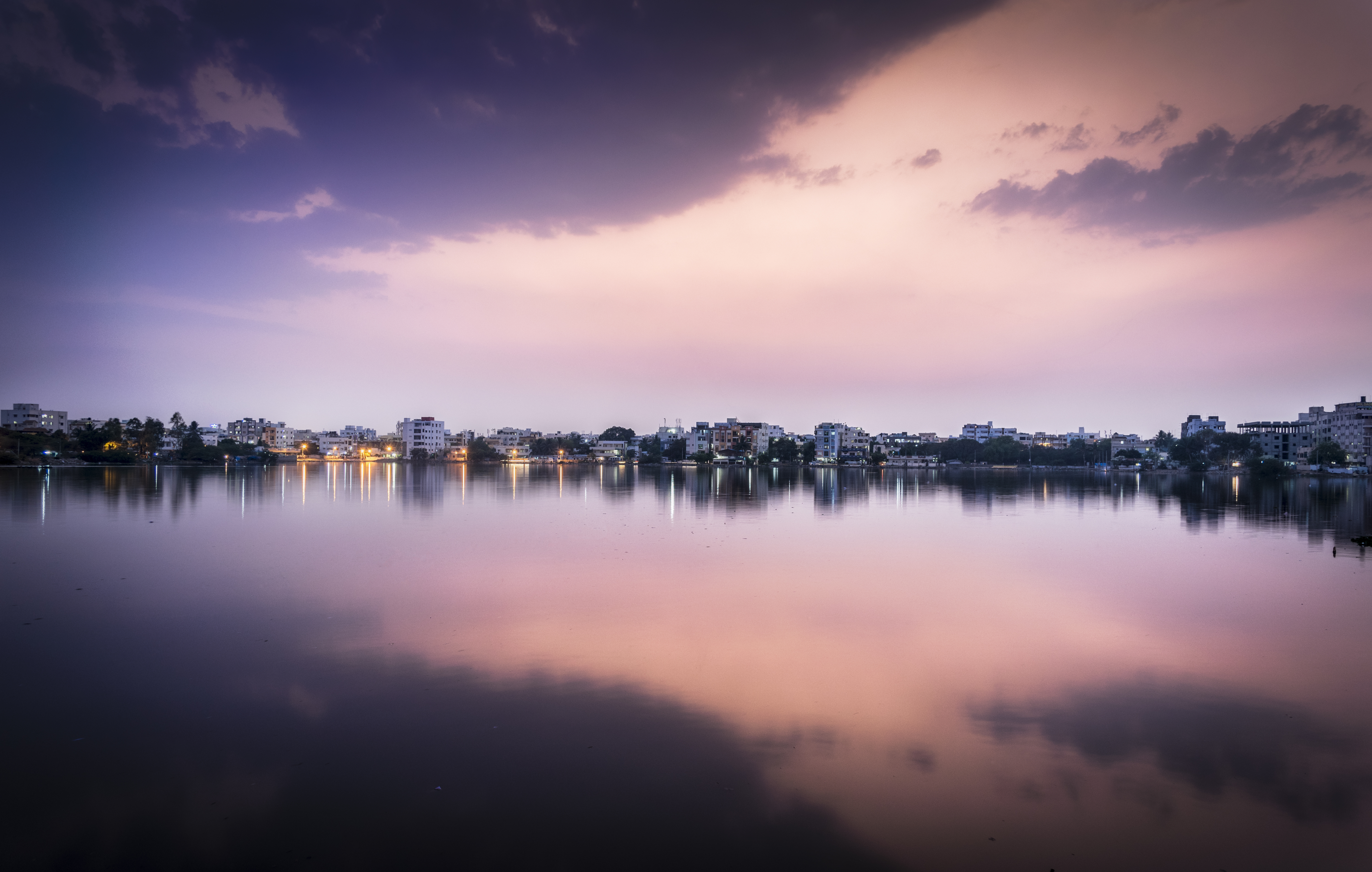
Saroornagar

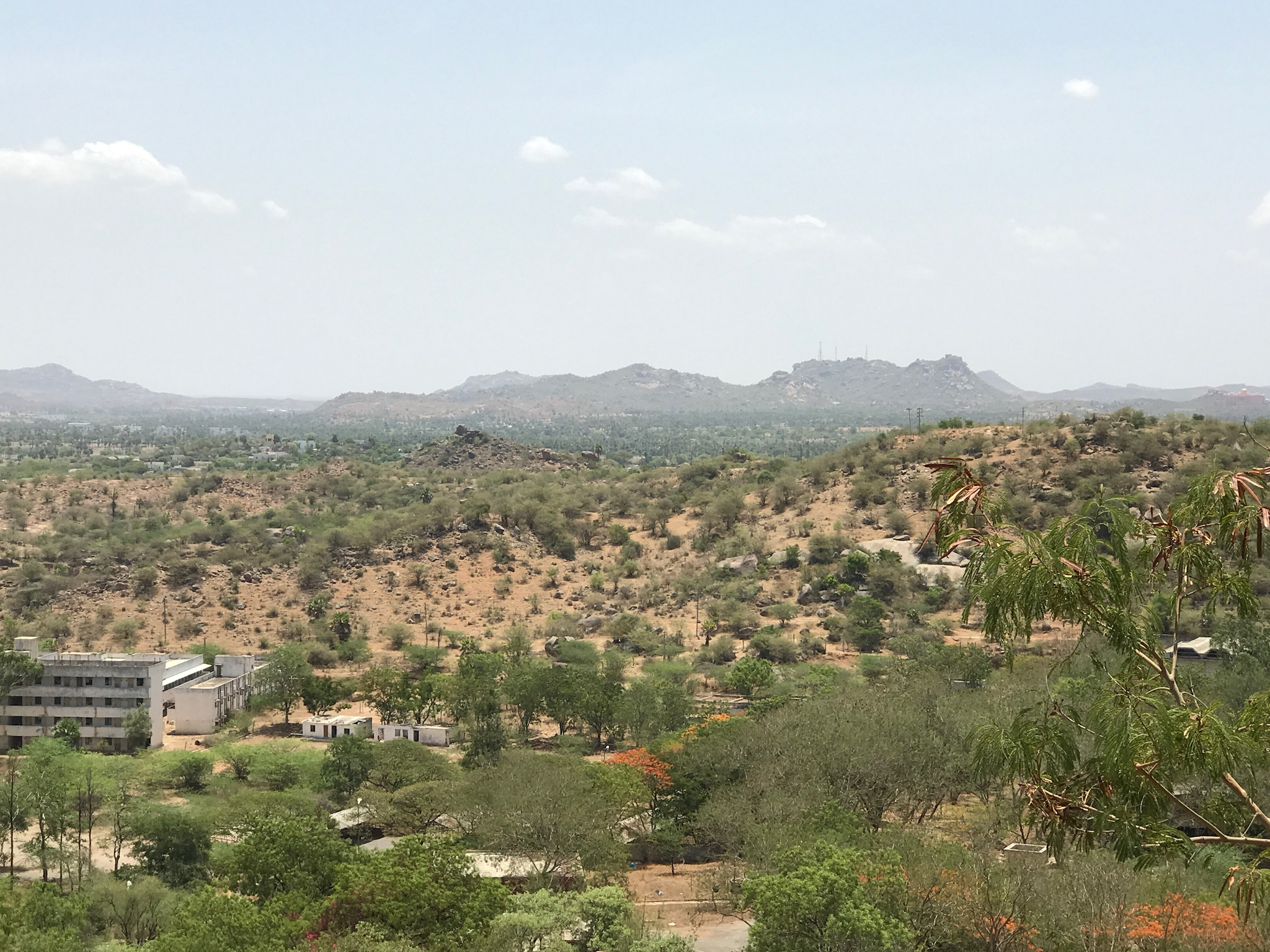
Hayathnagar

=== Dilsukhnagar ===
- Dilsukhnagar
- Kothapet
- Gaddiannaram
- Moosarambagh
- Chaitanyapuri

=== LB Nagar ===
- L. B. Nagar
- Bairamalguda
- Chintalakunta
- Vanasthalipuram
- Hastinapuram

=== Saroornagar ===
- Saroornagar
- Badangpet
- Balapur
- Champapet
- Jillelguda
- Karmanghat
- Lingojiguda
- Meerpet
- Sanghi Nagar
- Santoshnagar

=== Hayathnagar ===
- Hayathnagar
- Osman nager
- Ibrahim patnam

== South Western ==
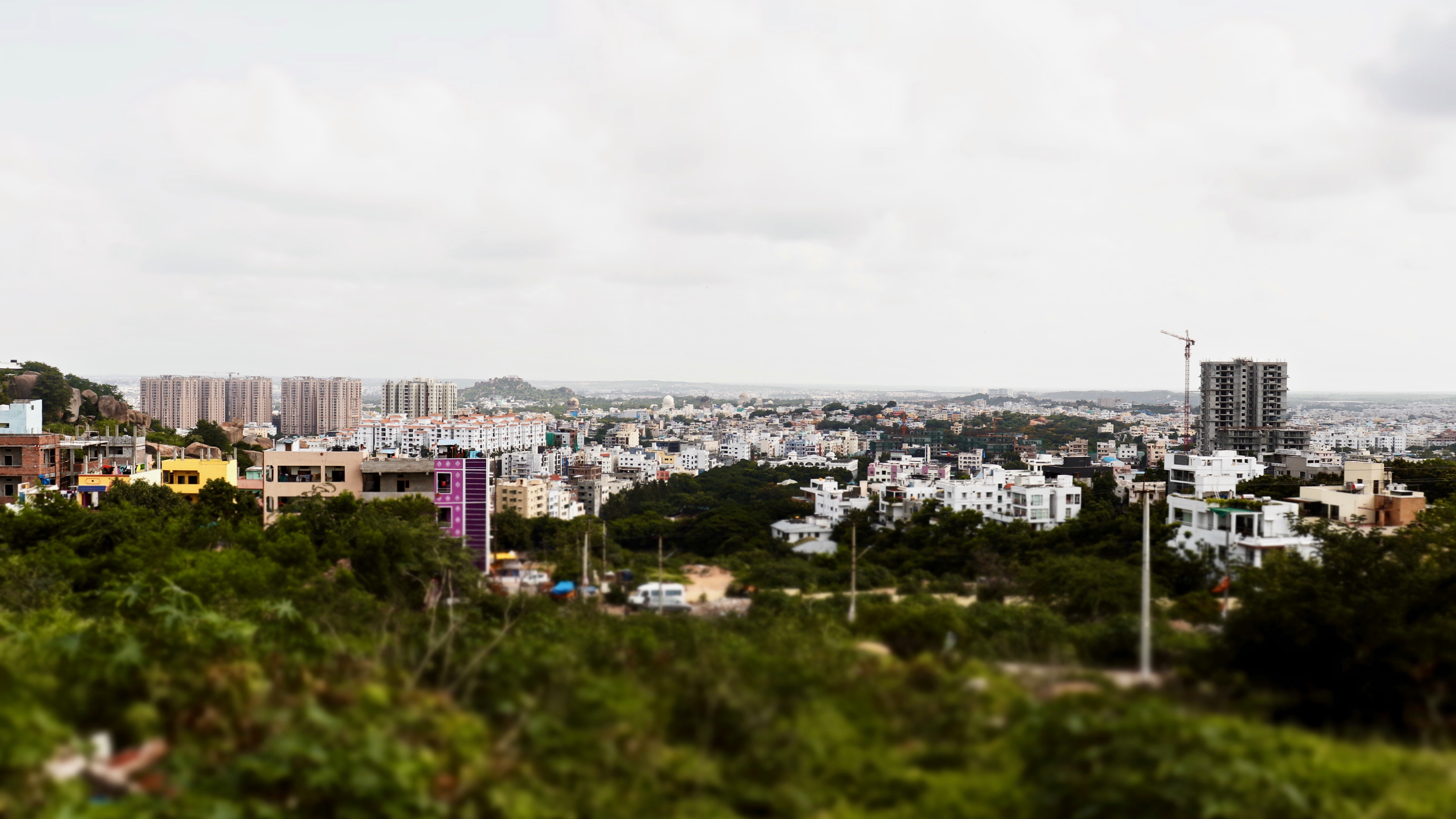
Tolichowki

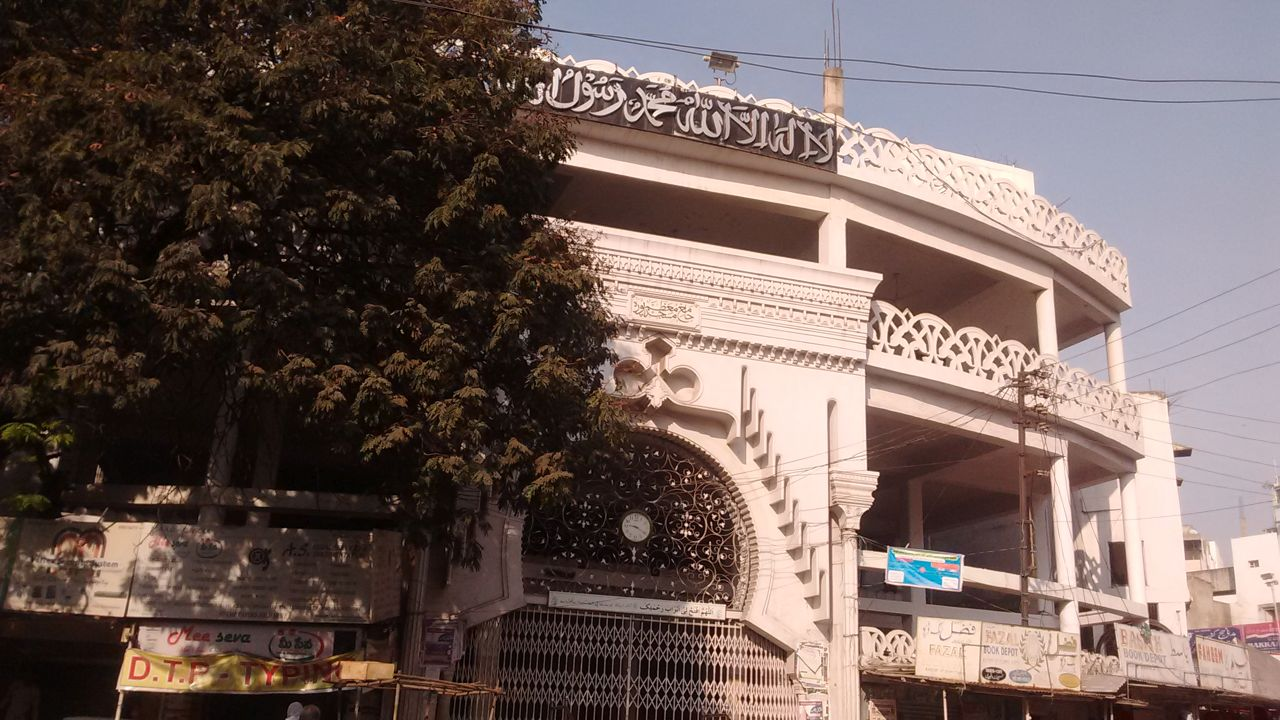
Mallepally

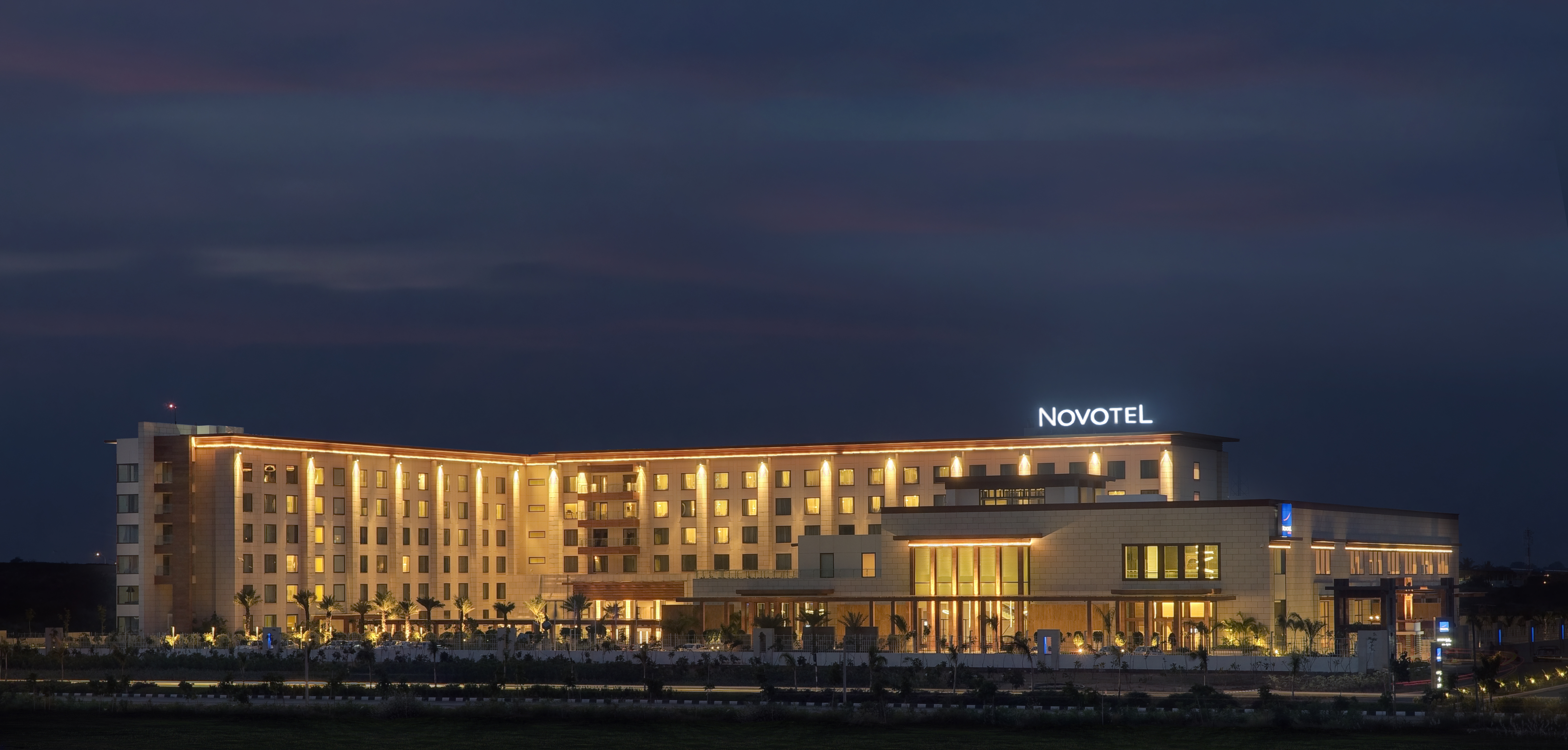
Shamshabad

=== Mehdipatnam ===
- Mehdipatnam
- Toli chowki
- Gudimalkapur
- Asif Nagar
- Langar Houz
- Laxminagar Colony
- Mallepally
- Padmanabha Nagar Colony
- Red Hills
- Shaikpet

=== Rajendranagar ===
- Rajendranagar
- Attapur
- Bandlaguda
- Gandipet
- Kismatpur
- Ringroad
- Puppalguda
- Kotapet
- Chevella
- Moinabad

=== Shamshabad ===
- Shamshabad
- Rajiv Gandhi International Airport
- Umdanagar
- Shadnagar
