= Gateway IT Park =

Tech Park in Hyderabad, India

Coordinates: 17.59700°N 78.49768°E

- Interactive map of the Gateway IT Park area

General information
- Type: Information Technology Park
- Location: Kandlakoya, Hyderabad, India
- Completed: Unknown
- Inaugurated: 2022
- Cost: ₹ 250 crore

Technical details
- Floor count: 14
- Floor area: 600,000 sq ft (56,000 m^{2})

Gateway IT Park is a proposed Indian business park focused on information technology located in the city of Kandlakoya, Medchal-Malkajgiri district, India.

Developer have shown little interest in the business park proposal and as of mid 2023 no developer had been signed up and no construction had yet taken place.

== The building ==
=== Infrastructure ===
Gateway IT Park is a proposed 14-story building. IT Minister of Telangana, K. T. Rama Rao & Minister of Labour and Employment Ch Malla Reddy laid the foundation stone for the facility. Telangana Industrial Infrastructure Corporation (TGIIC) was assigned to build the facility. However by mid 2023, nothing had yet been built.

== See also ==
- List of tallest buildings in Hyderabad
