= Venkatapuram, Hyderabad =

Venkatapuram
- Locality
- Location in the state of Telangana, India Venkatapuram (Telangana) Venkatapuram (India)
- Coordinates: 17.492117°N 78.505473°E
- Country: India
- State: Telangana
- District: Medchal–Malkajgiri
- City: Hyderabad

Languages
  - Official: Telugu & Tamil(Venkatraopet)
- Time zone: UTC+5:30 (IST)
- PIN Code Postal Area and Head Office: 500010
- Vehicle registration: TS-08
- Lok Sabha constituency: Malkajgiri
- Vidhan Sabha constituency: Malkajgiri
- Civic agency: GHMC

Venkatapuram is a locality and a ward in Alwal neighbourhood of Hyderabad city. It is administered as Ward No. 135 of Greater Hyderabad Municipal Corporation.
