= Masjid E Qutub Shahi Langer Houz =

Mosque in Hyderabad, Telangana, India

Masjid E Qutub Shahi
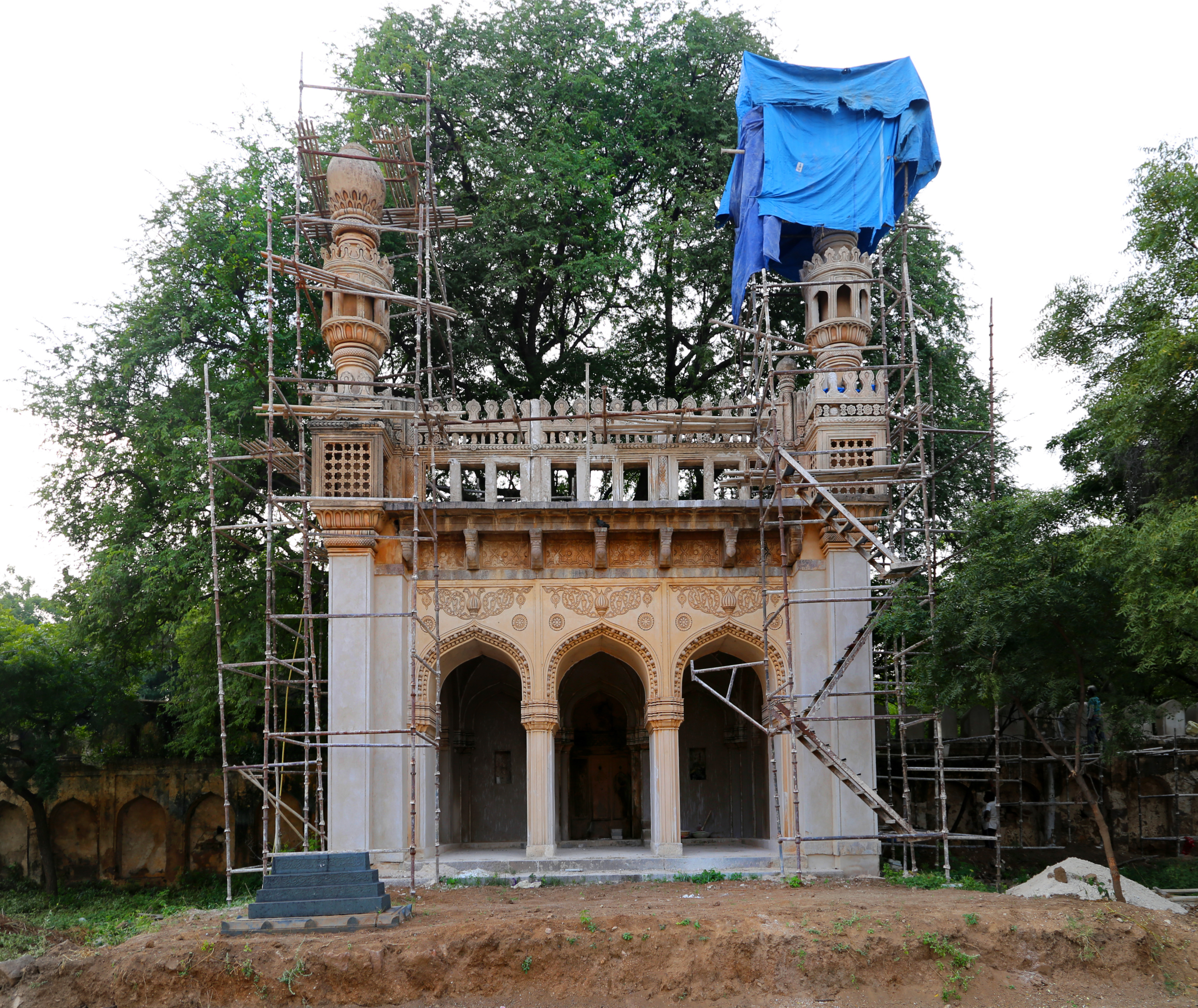
- The façade of the former mosque, undergoing repairs in 2019

- Location of the former mosque in Hyderabad

Religion
- Affiliation: Islam (former)
- Ecclesiastical or organizational status: Mosque (former)
- Status: Abandoned; (partial ruinous state)

Location
- Location: Langar Houz, Hyderabad, Hyderabad District, Telangana
- Country: India
- Interactive map of Masjid E Qutub Shahi
- Administration: Telangana Heritage Department
- Coordinates: 17°22′44″N 78°25′05″E

Architecture
- Type: Mosque architecture
- Style: Qutb Shahi
- Established: 16th Century
- Minaret: Two

Masjid e Qutb Shahi (Arabic: مسجد قطب شاه; Urdu: مسجد قطب شاہی) is a former mosque in a partial ruinous state, located in Langar Houz, Hyderabad, in the Hyderabad district of the state of Telangana, India.

The former mosques is associated with the Qutb Shahi dynasty, a ruling dynasty of the region during 1518–1687.

== Overview ==
Efforts have been made to preserve and restore Masjid e Qutb Shahi to ensure its architectural integrity. Various conservation projects and initiatives have taken place to maintain the mosque's historical and cultural value. The restoration work has helped in preserving the original features and enhancing the overall condition of the mosque.

== See also ==
- Islam in India
- List of mosques in Telangana
- List of State Protected Monuments in Telangana
