= Pet Basheerabad =

- Neighbourhood
- Location in Telangana, India Pet Basheerabad (Telangana) Pet Basheerabad (India)
- Coordinates: 17.521741°N 78.483421°E
- Country: India
- State: Telangana

Government
  - Type: Democratic
  - Body: Telangana Rasthra Samithi Party TRS
- Elevation: 550 m (1,800 ft)

Languages
  - Official: Telugu
- Time zone: UTC+5:30 (IST)
- Telephone code: 040
- Vehicle registration: TG-08
- Website: telangana.gov.in

Pet Basheerabad is a neighbourhood in Qutbullapur suburb in Hyderabad, Telangana, India. It falls under Quthbullapur mandal of Medchal-Malkajgiri district.

== Schools ==
St. Anns High School, Sherwood high school, have built its campus here.

== Colleges ==
SivaSivani Institute of Management, has a campus in the area.

== History ==
It was named after the Second son of Sikander Jah Mir Akbar ali khan Asaf Jah III or Nizam III Mir Basheeruddin Ali khan (Samsam ud daula).
