= Bazarghat =

- neighbourhood
- Location in Telangana, India Bazarghat (Telangana) Bazarghat (India)
- Coordinates: 17.393153°N 78.460272°E
- Country: India
- State: Telangana
- District: Hyderabad
- Metro: Hyderabad

Government
  - Body: GHMC

Languages
  - Official: Telugu
- Time zone: UTC+5:30 (IST)
- PIN: 500 004
- Vehicle registration: TG
- Lok Sabha constituency: Hyderabad
- Vidhan Sabha constituency: Khairatabad
- Planning agency: GHMC
- Website: telangana.gov.in

Bazarghat is one of the neighbourhoods in Khairatabad, Hyderabad, India. It is connected to the old city of Hyderabad. Bazarghat includes Redhills, which now serves as a residence for Mr. Mohd Mahboob Ali Khan and family.

== Transport ==
Bazarghat is connected by buses run by TGSRTC and is well connected to Hyderabad city.
