= Kistareddypet =

Village in Telangana, India

- Suburb
- Location of Kistareddypet in Telangana Kistareddypet (India)
- Coordinates: 17.54555°N 78.29433°E
- Country: India
- State: Telangana
- City: Hyderabad
- District: Sangareddy

Population
  - Total: 5,308
- Postal code: 502 319

Kistareddypet is a residential suburb in Hyderabad,It is situated in Serilingampally Zone, Cyberabad Municipal Corporation of Sangareddy district in the Indian state of Telangana. Its land area covers about 450 acres (1.8 km^{2}). Ilapur and Patel Guda are sub-villages (Omlets). The village is zoned as a Multipurpose Residential Zone by the HMDA, and is inside the Outer Ring Road. It is off ORR Exit 4, very near the Bollaram Industrial Area, and the Medical Equipment Zone. The reverse osmosis water supply is managed by BHEL. Some ventures in Kistareddypet include Rainbow Meadows, Sri Mytri Villas, BSR Colony, BHEL 3BHK Villas, BDL-1200 Villas, Meher Villas, Lakeview Enclave Villas, and Durga Nagar.

== Demographics ==
Kistareddypet's population as of 2020 was 5308, composed of 2725 males and 2583 females.

== Education ==
Schools in Kistareddypet include:

- FirstCry Intellitots Preschool & Daycare
- Krishnaveni
- Silver Oaks international school
- Government School
- ZPHS Kistareddypet
- Sai Techno High School
- Sadashiva International School
- Rainbow International School

== Lake ==
Kistareddypet Lake is a lake located in the Kistareddypet village. It is renowned for its migratory birds, such as the greater flamingo and garganey. It is one of the last places in Hyderabad where migratory birds come frequently.

Kistareddypet Lake
- Krishnareddypet Lake
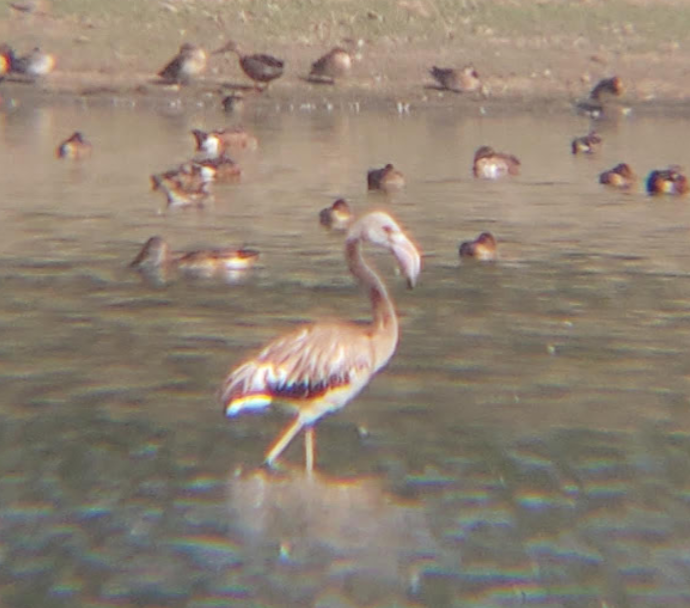
- Greater Flamingo in the lake
- Interactive map of Kistareddypet Lake
- Location: Hyderabad, India
- Coordinates: 17°33′04.5″N 78°18′11.5″E
- Frozen: Never

Over 100 species of birds can be spotted in the lake, such as the ruddy shelduck, little stint, peregrine falcon and the Mongolian short-toed lark.
