= Putlibowli =

- neighbourhood
- Location in Telangana, India Putlibowli (Telangana) Putlibowli (India)
- Coordinates: 17.381399°N 78.481926°E
- Country: India
- State: Telangana
- District: Hyderabad
- Metro: Hyderabad

Government
  - Body: GHMC

Languages
  - Official: Telugu
- Time zone: UTC+5:30 (IST)
- PIN: 500 095
- Vehicle registration: TG
- Lok Sabha constituency: Hyderabad
- Vidhan Sabha constituency: Nampally, Hyderabad
- Planning agency: GHMC
- Website: telangana.gov.in

Putlibowli is one of the neighbourhoods in Hyderabad, India. It is part of the old city of Hyderabad.

== Transport ==
Putlibowli is connected by buses run by TSRTC and is well connected to Hyderabad city.
