= Alijah Kotla =

- Neighbourhood
- Location in Telangana, India Alijah Kotla (Telangana) Alijah Kotla (India)
- Coordinates: 17°21′26″N 78°28′37″E
- Country: India
- State: Telangana
- District: Hyderabad
- Metro: Hyderabad

Government
  - Body: GHMC

Languages
  - Official: Urdu
- Time zone: UTC+5:30 (IST)
- Vehicle registration: TG
- Lok Sabha constituency: Hyderabad
- Vidhan Sabha constituency: Charminar
- Planning agency: GHMC
- Civic agency: GHMC
- Website: telangana.gov.in

Alijah Kotla also known as Kotla Alijah is a neighbourhood in Hyderabad, India. It is located near the historic, Charminar and is existing from when the historic Charminar is established. It is one of the oldest area in Hyderabad located straight to the east of Charminar.
