= Langar Houz =

Langar House
- Suburb
- Langar Houz
- Location in Hyderabad, India
- Coordinates: 17.3782°N 78.4208°E
- Country: India
- State: Telangana
- District: Hyderabad District

Government
  - Body: GHMC

Population
  - Total: 40,185

Languages
  - Official: Deccani Urdu, Telugu
- Time zone: UTC+5:30 (IST)
- PIN: 500008 (Tolichowki)
- Lok Sabha constituency: Hyderabad
- Planning agency: GHMC

Langar Houz is a suburb of Hyderabad, near Golconda, in the Indian state of Telangana. It is a major commercial centre for the city's cantonment area. Langar Houz was once considered to be the gateway to the city and Golkonda Palace.

This area is well known for its student population due to its close proximity to various engineering colleges. Many politicians and government employees live there. It serves India's biggest military artillery centre.

== History ==
Langar means "a chain used to tether an elephant". During the Nizam rule a golden langar was donated to a Muslim recluse by the queen. Later, this was cut in pieces and distributed among holy men as jagir.

During the period of Muslim Bahmani Sultanate, in Langar food was cooked and served to people of all religions with love and affection and hence it came to be called as Langar Houz.

== Gandhi Sarovar at Bapu Ghat ==
Bapu Ghat at Langar House, Hyderabad was one of the 11 places in India where the ashes of Mahatma Gandhi were immersed. Hyderabad was still a princely state at the time. The ashes were brought to the city on February 12, 1948. A small memorial was built there and expanded at a later date. Gandhi Sarovar project is now being developed in Phase 1 of Musi Riverfront Development Project.

== Transport ==
Langar Houz is connected by buses run by TSRTC.

The closest MMTS train station is at Nampally. Lakdi ka pul is about 7 to 8 km away. Nearest metro station is lakdikapool

Rajiv Gandhi International Airport is about 26 to 28 km away and three routes connect to RGIA .

== Culture ==
Dargah Syed Meeran Hussaini Quadri Bogdad is the oldest dargah in the city. It treats patients with mental illness. Several reports stated that mental patients are treated cruelly and are chained inside the dargah.

Dupki Punnam is the holy dip where people wash at the confluence of the Esi and Musi rivers. Musi later turned into a municipal sewer and lost its status as a sacred river.

The old Qutub Shahi Jamai Masjid is there as is a temple of Lord Sriram.

== Neighbourhoods ==
- Mehdipatnam
- Golkonda
- Tolichowki
- Attapur
- Bandlaguda Jagir
