= Badichowdi =

- Neighbourhood
- Location in Hyderabad, Telangana, India Badichowdi (Telangana) Badichowdi (India)
- Coordinates: 17.389055°N 78.48659°E
- Country: India
- State: Telangana
- District: Hyderabad

Government
  - Body: GHMC

Languages
  - Official: Telugu
- Time zone: UTC+5:30 (IST)
- PIN: 500 095
- Vehicle registration: TG
- Lok Sabha constituency: Hyderabad
- Vidhan Sabha constituency: Goshamahal
- Planning agency: GHMC
- Website: telangana.gov.in

Badichowdi is a commercial suburbs in Hyderabad, the capital city of Telangana, India.

== Commercial area ==
The commercial area of Badichowdi features a large shopping mall, mainly for women's clothes and silverware, as well as a vegetable market.

== Transport ==
The state run TSRTC is near a large bus junction. The closest MMTS train station is at Kachiguda or Malakpet.

== School ==
Badichowdi has two Schools: Cambridge High School and Ahilya Education Society
