= Medical Devices Park, Hyderabad =

Industrial estate

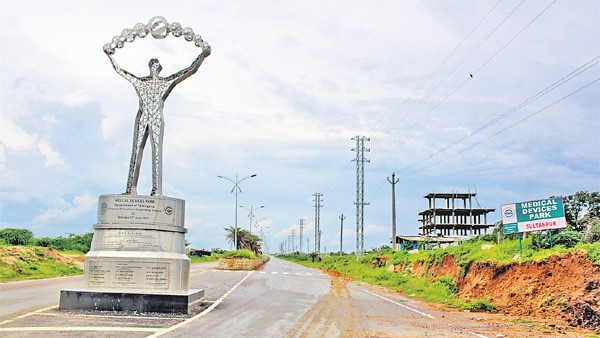

Medical Devices Park, Hyderabad is a medical devices industrial estate located in Hyderabad, Telangana, India. The largest such Park in India spread over 250 acres. The dedicated park's ecosystem supports medical technology innovation and manufacturing.

== History ==
The Park was inaugurated on 17 June 2017 near Hyderabad at Sultanpur in Patancheru of Sangareddy district by the Minister for Industries, K. T. Rama Rao.
