= Mehboob ki Mehendi, Hyderabad =

Mehboob ki Mehendi محبوب کی مہندی
- Neighbourhood
- Location in Hyderabad,Telangana, India Mehboob ki Mehendi (Telangana) Mehboob ki Mehendi (India)
- Coordinates: 17.384°N 78.4867°E
- Country: India
- State: Telangana
- District: Hyderabad

Government
  - Body: GHMC

Languages
  - Official: Telugu. Urdu
- Time zone: UTC+5:30 (IST)
- Vehicle registration: TG
- Lok Sabha constituency: Hyderabad
- Planning agency: GHMC
- Website: telangana.gov.in

Mehboob ki Mehendi is a neighbourhood in Hyderabad, Telangana, India. It was a mujra joint, a time honoured tradition of music and dance, during the reign of the Nizams in Hyderabad State.

== History ==
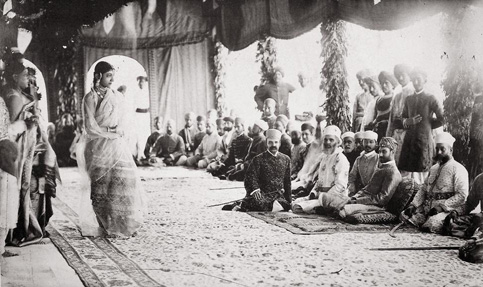
Mushaira by courtesans during the reign of Nizams in Hyderabad

It got its name after a Chilla of Mahboob Subhani, where the mujras were popular. Noted courtesan, Mah Laqa Bai, was present here. The courtesans and other performing artistes held a respectable position in Hyderabad before Aurangzeb's reign.

== Present day ==
In the 1980s it became the red light area. But in 1996, the area was evacuated. Prominent NGO, Prajwala is working to rehabilitate the children.
