= Kandlakoya =

Kandlakoya Kandlakoi
- Village
- Country: India
- State: Telangana

Languages
  - Official: Telugu
- Time zone: UTC+5:30 (IST)
- Telephone code: 040
- Vehicle registration: TS-26 X XXXX
- Sex ratio: 1:1(approx) ♂/♀
- Website: telangana.gov.in

Kandlakoya is a village in Medchal district in Telangana, India. It falls under Medchal mandal. There is a junction of Outer Ring Road, Hyderabad passing through the village. Kandlakoya is 11 km from Suchitra Center and 6 km from Kompally Cross Roads. Sai Geetha Ashram is also located here. The largest gated community in the area is Sanjana's Courtyard.

A small shopping mall for women's & Girls Named 'Shobha Fashion' also Located at Kandlakoya Mainroad

== Educational institutions ==
Siva Sivani Public School is located here. CMR College of Engineering & Technology, CMR Institute Of Technology, CMR Technical Campus a UGC Autonomous Institution, CMR Engineering college and CMR College of Pharmacy are located here.

== Commercial area ==
Kandlakoya is home to many warehouses since it is close to Outer Ring Road. The area is just 1KM away from the ORR entry/exit.

Information Technology is another sector in which the city is making steady progress with Gateway IT Park.
