= Pan bazar =

Locality in Secunderabad, India

Pan bazar is a locality situated near 'James Street' Secunderabad, Telangana, India. Pan bazar is a residential and commercial area in the heart of the city.

== Economy ==
A wide variety of businesses consisting of wholesale cloth merchants, gold merchants, hardware equipment stores, steel market stores and transportation companies are located here.

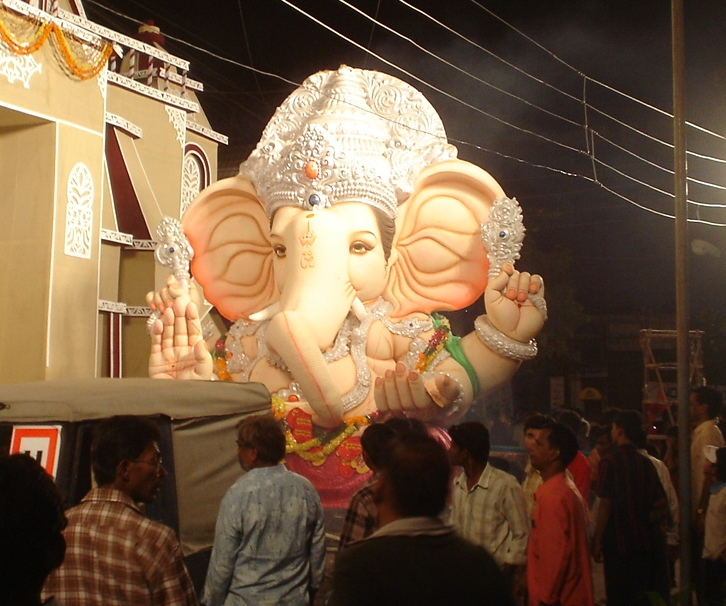
Vinayaka Idol at Pavan Club
