= Sindhi Colony, Secunderabad =

Sindhi Colony
- Neighbourhood
- Location in Telangana, India Sindhi Colony (Telangana) Sindhi Colony (India)
- Coordinates: 17°28′N 78°31′E
- Country: India
- State: Telangana
- District: Hyderabad
- Metro: Hyderabad

Government
  - Body: Cantonment Board, Secunderabad

Languages
  - Official: Telugu
- Time zone: UTC+5:30 (IST)
- PIN: 500 015
- Lok Sabha constituency: Secunderabad Lok Sabha constituency
- Vidhan Sabha constituency: Cantonment
- Planning agency: Cantonment Board, Secunderabad

Sindhi Colony is a major suburb of Secunderabad, India. It was founded to house refugee Sindhis coming from Sindh that became a part of Pakistan after the partition of India in 1947. It is to the north of Hyderabad.

The suburb has many smaller residential colonies. Adjacent communities like Babu Bagh, Krishna, Venakat Rao and Jawahar Lal communities are considered part of Sindhi Colony. This suburb is one of the most affluent sections of Secunderabad, home to traders and educated professionals of the city.

== History ==
Historically, before Sindhi Colony was built it was the back water areas of the Hussain Sagar lake to hold excess water. The first dam was built in 1946 by Michael Bakes.

== Commercial area ==
There are many shops for all kinds of needs in this suburb. In 2002, a lot of garment factory outlets opened in the suburb. Many branded clothes for all ranges can be found here at discounted prices. Because of this, people from many parts of the city come to shop here.

There is an RTA office which serves entire Secunderabad Region (AP 10). Many banks started operating since 2002, catering to the growing population of this suburb like Andhra Bank (Sindhi Colony), SBI etc. are located here.
