= Bairamalguda =

- Locality
- Location in Telangana, India Bairamalguda (Telangana) Bairamalguda (India)
- Coordinates: 17.340196°N 78.54124°E
- Country: India
- State: Telangana
- District: Ranga Reddy
- Metro: Hyderabad

Government
  - Body: GHMC

Languages
  - Official: Telugu
- Time zone: UTC+5:30 (IST)
- PIN: 500 079
- Vehicle registration: TG
- Lok Sabha constituency: Malkajgiri Lok Sabha constituency
- Vidhan Sabha constituency: L.B. Nagar Assembly constituency
- Planning agency: GHMC
- Website: telangana.gov.in

Bairamalguda is a locality in Hyderabad, Telangana, India.

== Commercial area ==
A variety of choices for shops at Bairamalguda is present. There are function halls in this area used for weddings and parties like Sri Nilayam Gardens, Gajjala Janga Reddy Gardens, Pindi Pulla Reddy Gardens, Edulakanti Ram Reddy Gardens, and KKK Gardens.

== Transport ==
Bairamalguda is connected by buses run by TSRTC, since a bus depot is close by, it is well connected. Buses that run are 104R, 277, 293, 93 etc. The nearest MMTS train station is Malakpet MMTS station.and the nearest Hyderabad Metro station is LB Nagar.
