= Nagaram, Medchal–Malkajgiri district =

Nagaram Nagaram Municipality
- Suburb, Municipality
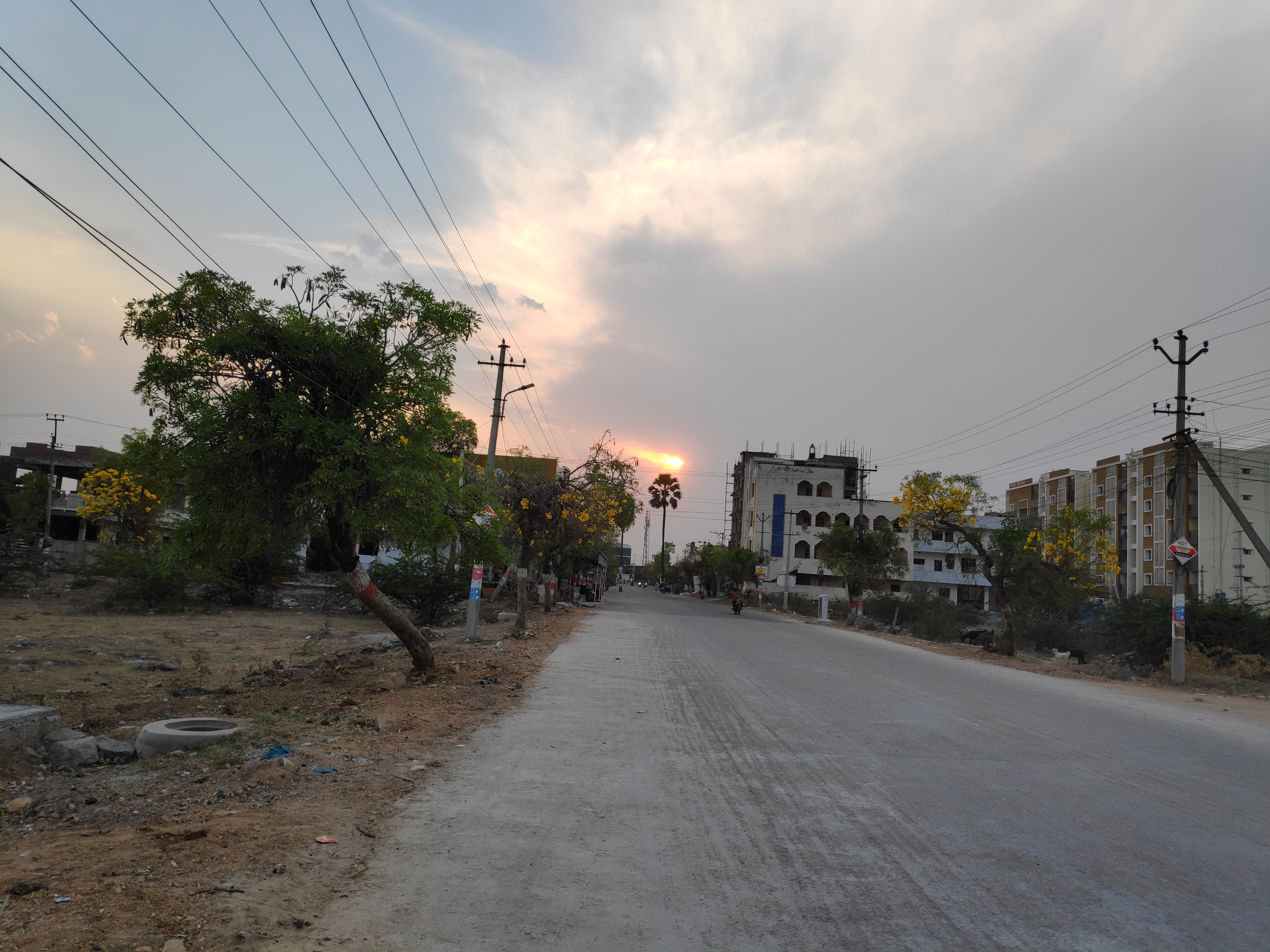
- Sunset at Nagaram, Hyderabad

- Location in Hyderabad, India
- Coordinates: 17.487478°N 78.601236°E
- Country: India
- State: Telangana
- District: Medchal-Malkajgiri
- Mandal: Keesara
- Metro: Hyderabad Metropolitan Region
- Incorporated: 20–04–2019

Government
  - Type: Municipality
  - Body: Nagaram Municipality

Area
  - Total: 10 km^{2} (3.9 sq mi)

Population (2001)
  - Total: 64,542
  - Density: 6,500/km^{2} (17,000/sq mi)

Languages
  - Official: Telugu
- Time zone: UTC+5:30 (IST)
- Postal code: 500083
- Telephone code: 040
- Vehicle registration: TS 08 X XXXX
- Sex ratio: 1:1(approx) ♂/♀
- Website: medchal-malkajgiri.telangana.gov.in/nagaram-municipality/

Nagaram is a suburb of Hyderabad and a municipality in Telangana, India. And it also the largest Revenue Village falls under Keesara mandal of Medchal-Malkajgiri district. Due to its proximity to ECIL Company, Secunderabad and Eastern IT/SEZ of Hyderabad Pocharam, it is emerging as a major residential location in Hyderabad.

The nearest localities to Nagaram is Ahmadguda, Dammaiguda and Kushaiguda.

Till 2013 this area was dotted with green paddy fields everywhere. This has changed a lot due to the demand for residential apartments and commercial establishments all across Rampally main road. The demand for residential houses has increased because of various reasons like the proximity to Outer Ring Road, declaration of Nagaram municipality and due to abundant options for public transport.

== Nagaram Municipality ==
Nagaram Municipality was constituted vide Go Ms No: 93 of MA & UD Dept Dated :18-04-2018, duly merging existing Gram Panchayats of Nagaram & Rampally Villages . The Municipality Administration is functioning w.e.f on Dt : 02–08–2018.

Nagaram Municipality was established on 20 April, 2019. It is located close to Hyderabad (Capital of Telangana). It is highly facilitated for all means of transportations and adjacent to ORR. Nagaram Municipality consisting of 103 colonies, approximate population above 64542 including Rampally village which is merged into Nagaram Municipality.

Till 2013 this area was dotted with green paddy fields everywhere. This has changed a lot due to the demand for residential apartments and commercial establishments all across Rampally main road. The demand for residential houses has increased because of various reasons like the proximity to Outer Ring Road, declaration of Nagaram municipality and due to abundant options for public transport. Nagaram is situated about 481 metres (1,578 ft) above sea level. There are three lakes Nagaram Annarayana Cheruvu, Nagaram Cheruvu, Rampally Cheruvu, in the vicinity of the area.

Newly merged villages in Nagaram Municipality are:

- Bogaram
- Godumakunta
- Karimguda Hamlet (Rampally Revenue village)
- Rampally Dayara Hamlet(Rampally Revenue Village)

=== Nagaram Revenue Village ===
Easterwile Nagaram Village has it hamlet villages Dammaigudem, Ahmedgudem Bandlaguda Village, Now They are bifurcated as a separate municipality. Localities of Nagaram Village.

- Naagavaram Old Village
- Simhapuri Colony
- Shilpa nagar,
- Satyanarayanapuram,
- New Hanuman Nagar Colony
- East & West Gandhi nagar,
- RL nagar,
- RTC Colony,
- Heaven Down Residency
- SV Colony,
- Reddy Colony,
- Rampally X Roads,(Nagaram) formally Ghatkesar Way X Road,
- Dammaiguda Way X Roads (Nagaram X Road).
- Ipws colony(Indra priyadarshini welfare society)

== Geography ==
Nagaram is situated about 481 metres (1,578 ft) above sea level. There are two lakes in the vicinity of the area.

== Transport ==
The Area is well connected by TGSRTC to the rest of the city, having bus depot at Kushaiguda. Nearest railway station is Charlapalli railway station at about 5 km and Moula Ali at about 10 km, The other nearest major railway junction is Secunderabad at about 17.1 km. There is a proposal to upgrade Cherlapally Railway Station,[3] as a Major Terminus to decongest traffic in Secunderabad Railway Station. Nearest exit and entry junction for Nehru Outer Ring Road is at Keesara Junction. The ECIL to Keesaragutta road passes through Nagaram. There is also a connecting route to the Karimnagar highway that passes through Nagaram and takes diversion from Cheriyal to Shamirpet which is mostly used nowadays in order to avoid traffic on the Karimnagar highway at Alwal – Bolarum corridor of Secunderabad Cantonment. One can also reach the Warangal highway by taking a diversion towards Rampally X roads through Ghatkesar. This is one of the reasons the area is witnessing major development in terms of commercial establishments all across the main road.

== Economy ==
The presence of various retail outlets has led to hikes in commercial rents in the recent past. D Mart, Reliance Digital, Usodaya super market, More super market, Vishal Mega mart and showrooms of Royal Enfield Royaloak, and various other service centers located within Nagaram's vicinity. Close to 20 furniture outlets have come up in this area.

== Tourism and temples ==
The famous and well known Sri Ramalingeshwara Swami Temple is located at Keesara Gutta near by Nagaram Municipality within 10 km of radius. Mosque: There is a very large Masjid located beside the main road of Nagaram, next to government school. The name of masjid is Hazrat Khaja Bande Nawaz Jama masjid.
