= St. Andrews School (India) =

Location
- Nehru Nagar Colony, West Marredpally, Secunderabad, Telangana, 500026; India; 17.4456204°N 78.4978803°E

Information
- Type: Private school
- Motto: Reach Out For Knowledge And Truth
- Established: 1985
- School board: CBSE
- Principal: Mrs. Shamita Bhattacharya
- Staff: 600+
- Grades: PS – 12(Bowenpally)
- Years offered: 35
- Gender: co-educational
- Age range: 3–17 years
- Language: English Telugu
- Campus size: 21 acres (bowenpally)
- Campus type: Big campus
- Colours: blue,red ,yellow and green
- Teams: Football, Basketball, Athletics, Chess
- Website: www.standrewsindia.com
- Unofficial

St. Andrews School is one of the largest schools in the state of Telangana, India. The school was established in 1985 by the Emanuel family in memory of Louis William Emanuel. St. Andrews is managed by the St. Louis Education Society. Today, it has over 20,000 students.

== Branches ==
From a single school, the school has grown in popularity and size, expanding into three major campuses in Bowenpally, Marredpally and Keesara. The fourth branch of St. Andrews School is located in Whitefield, Bangalore.

== St. Andrews Prep ==
Branching out to a kindergarten curriculum, St. Andrews Prep was established to satisfy the increasing demands for an Andrewite education. St. Andrews Prep offers a benchmarked kindergarten curriculum. There are four branches of St. Andrews Prep, in Sainikpuri, Dammaiguda, Yapral and Moula Ali.

== See also ==
- Education in India
- List of schools in India
- List of institutions of higher education in Telangana
