= Ahmedguda =

Ahmedguda Bandlagudem Village
- Village
- Nickname: bandlaguda
- Location in Telangana, India Ahmedguda (India)
- Coordinates: 17°30′47″N 78°35′50″E
- Country: India
- State: Telangana
- District: Medchal district
- City: Hyderabad

Government
  - Body: HMDA

Languages
  - Official: Telugu
- Time zone: UTC+5:30 (IST)
- Pincode: 501301
- Telephone code: 040
- Vehicle registration: TS-08 X XXXX
- Lok Sabha constituency: Malkajgiri
- Sex ratio: 1:1(approx) ♂/♀
- Assembly constituency: Medchal
- Website: telangana.gov.in

Ahmedguda formally known as Bandlagudem is a locality in Dammaiguda Municipality in Medchal district in Telangana, India. Earlier (Before 2010) It was Hamlet Village in Naagram Village then later burificated as a Separate Gram Panchayat after its merger with Dammaiguda to become Dammaiguda Municipality. It falls under Keesara mandal.
