= Yadgarpally =

Yadgarpally Yadgarpalle
- Village & Suburban
- Yadgarpally
- Location in Telangana, India
- Coordinates: 17°33′09″N 78°37′48″E
- Country: India
- State: Telangana
- District: Medchal-Malkajgiri district
- Mandal: Keesara
- Metro: Hyderabad Metropolitan Region

Government
  - Type: Municipality
  - Body: Dammaiguda Municipality
  - Rank: 1

Languages
  - Official: Telugu
- Time zone: UTC+5:30 (IST)
- Postal code: 501301
- Telephone code: 040
- Vehicle registration: TS-08 X XXXX
- Sex ratio: 1:1(approx) ♂/♀
- Website: telangana.gov.in

Yadgarpally is a village in Medchal-Malkajgiri district in Telangana, India. It falls under Keesara mandal. The village is divided as Yadgarpalle (East & West). The Outer Ring Road passes through the village. It is 4 km away from Keesara and Shamirpet and close to Ghatkesar

The famous temple in the village is "Chittharamma Temple" .

It has DRDO (Defence research and development organization) towards north of the village which comes under ministry of defence, Govt. Of India.

There is a lake named as " Gandi cheruvu".

Which is one of the source of the paddy farms in the village.

The drinking water source is of the Telangana government provided "Mission Bhageeratha".

There are two private schools which offers education up to the grade ten.

And One Zilla Parishad high school which is a Government school under the government of Telangana.

Major festivals celebrated in the village are:

1. Chittharamma temple Yearly celebrations held in the month of February.

2. Dussehra

3. Diwali

4. Ramzan

5. Muharram

6. Ugadhi

7. Shiva Ratri

8. Bathukamma festival

9. Bonalu

10. Katta maisamma ( once in a five years)

Languages spoken :

Telugu

Hindi

English

Languages

- Radial Road No. 15, RR 15 Radhika X Road to Yadgarpally outer ring road.

Temples Around :

This temple is at three kilometres distance from Yadgarpally village. The temple is located in cheeryal village.
