= Edulabad =

- Village
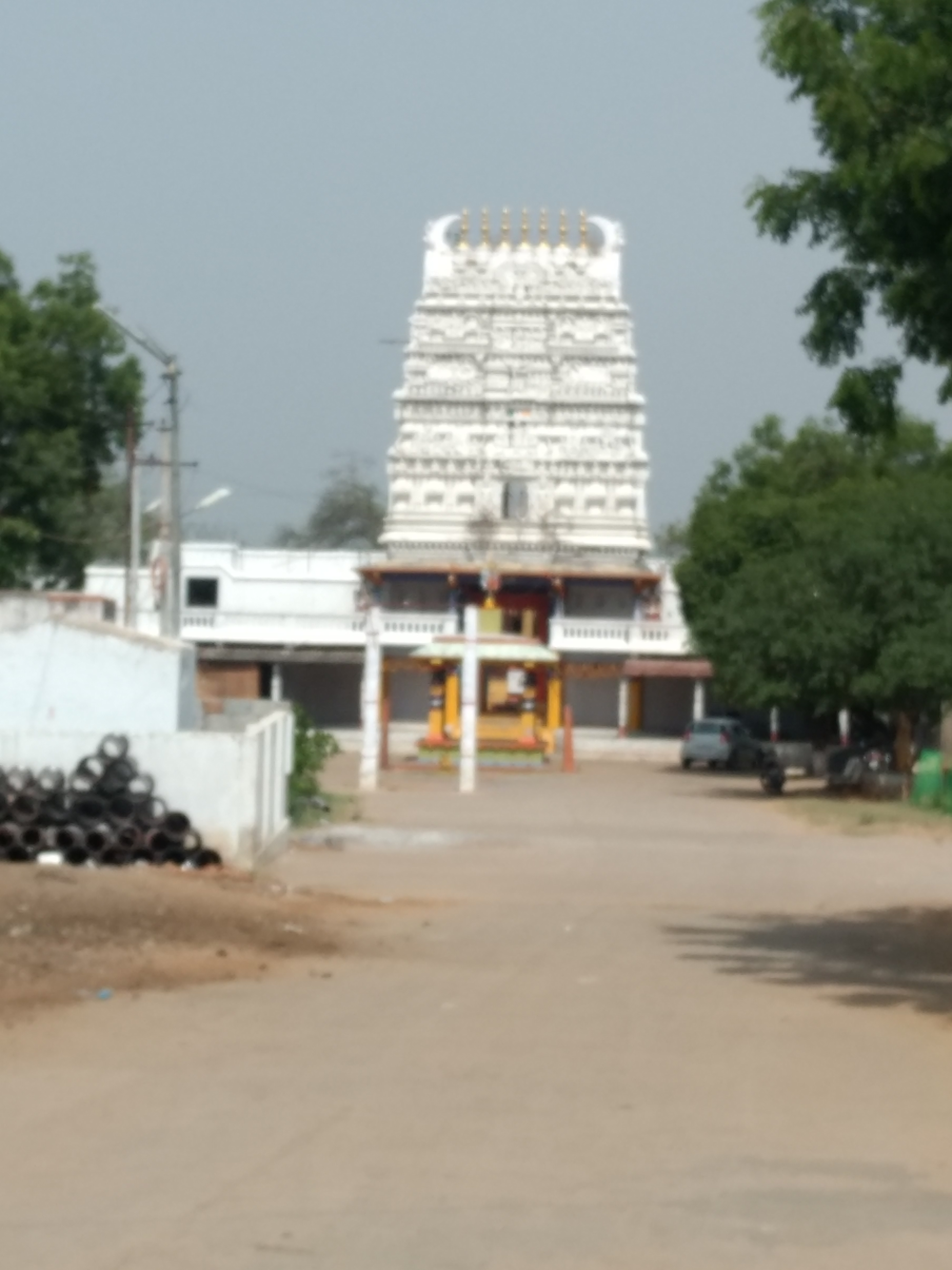
- A temple in Edulabad
- Interactive map of Edulabad
- Country: India
- State: Telangana

Languages
  - Official: Telugu
- Time zone: UTC+5:30 (IST)
- PIN: 501301
- Telephone code: 08415
- Vehicle registration: TS 08 XXXX
- Website: telangana.gov.in

Edulabad is a village in Medchal-Malkajgiri district in Telangana, India. It falls under Ghatkesar mandal. Edulabad has a big lake known as Edulabad Water Reservoir (EBWR). It is famous for Andal Ranganayaka swamy temple, Venu Gopala swamy temple and Shri Bramaramba sametha Mallikarjuna Swamy temple

Educational Institutions

1. Megha Engineering college for women's Edulabad

2.Omega PG college and Omega B.pharmacy college, Edulabad

3. GBN B.pharmacy college, Koremula road Edulabad Village

4. Urban Residential School (boys)

5. Telangana Social Welfare Residential school (Functioning at KITE college)

6. ZPHS Boys & Girls High School

7. Primary schools (2)

8. Vidya Kiran School

9. Pudami School
