= Rampally =

- Village
- Country: India
- State: Telangana

Languages
  - Official: Telugu
- Time zone: UTC+5:30 (IST)
- Telephone code: 040
- Vehicle registration: TS-08 X XXXX
- Sex ratio: 1:1(approx) ♂/♀

Rampally is a village in Nagaram Municipality falls under Keesara mandal of Medchal-Malkajgiri district in Telangana, India. The close proximity to Pocharam, IT Park in Ghatkesar has led to a sudden increase in population in this area.

== Localities In Rampally Village ==
Rampally Revenue village consists 3 Villages.They are following:

- Rampally Main Village
- Karimguda Hamlet
- Rampally Dayara

== See also ==
- Rambally
