= Khajaguda Lake =

- Thavutoni Kunta
- ఖజగూడ లేక్ (Telugu)
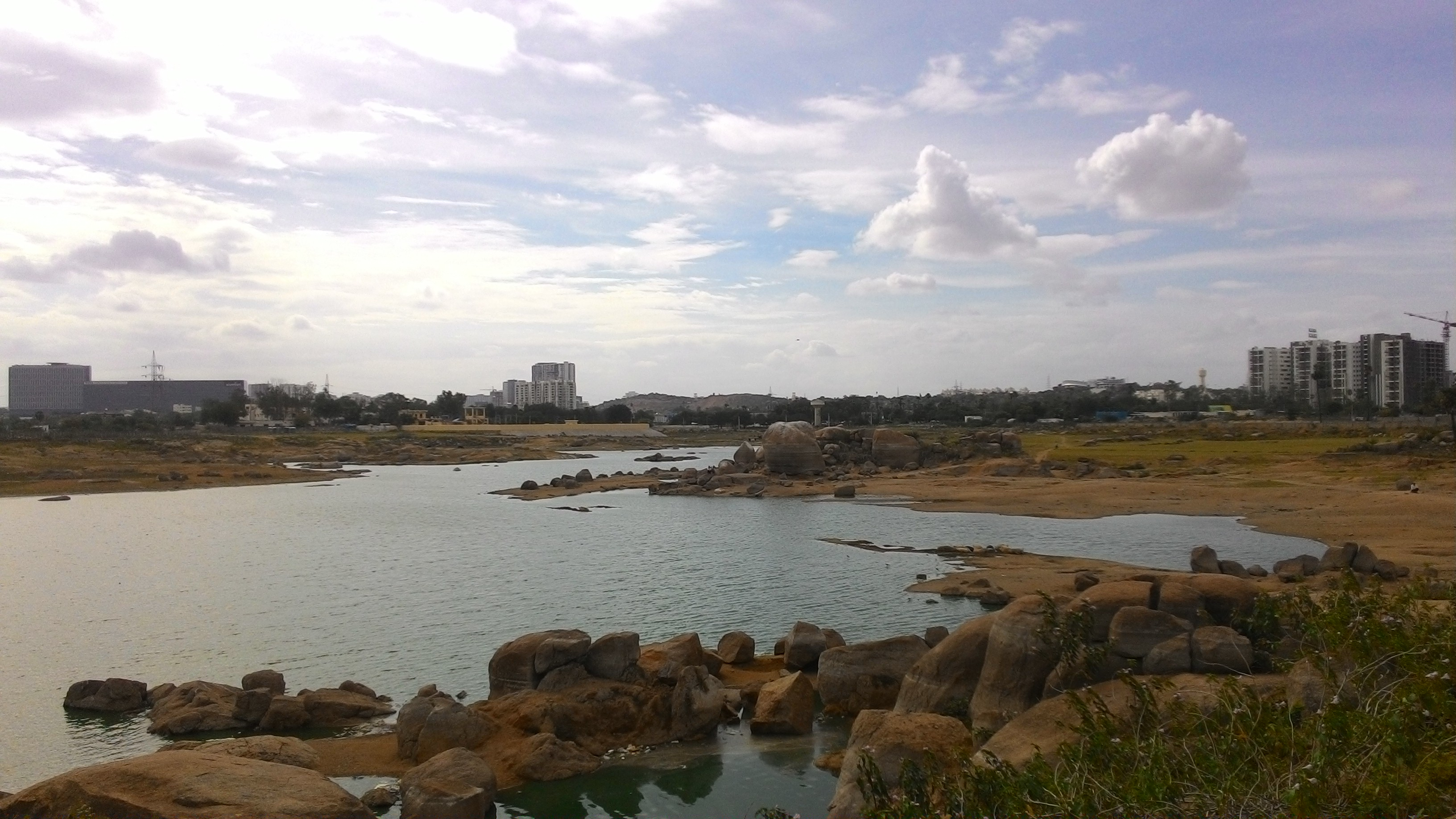

- Location in Hyderabad Khajaguda Lake (India)
- Location: Makthakousarali, Hyderabad
- Coordinates: 17.4148017°N 78.3573688°E
- Type: Natural lake
- Built: 1897
- Surface area: 37-acre (0.15 km^{2})

Khajaguda Lake, also known as Thavutoni Kunta is a lake in Ranga Reddy District in the Indian state of Telangana and on the western edge of the city of Hyderabad, in the suburb of Manikonda, in the middle of Makthakousarali, Khajaguda area.

== History ==
Khajaguda Lake was built in 1897 during the reign of 6th Nizam Nawab Mahboob Ali Khan. This lake was spread over 618-acre (2.50 km^{2}). This lake supplied water to 900 acres of Ayakattu in Kamareddy, Sarampally and Narsampally areas.

An official survey dated February 25, 2014 showed that the Full Tank level (FTL) of Khajaguda Talab is spread over 38.004 acres (15.38 ha) and a resurvey dated September 18, 2019, showed that the lake is 37 acres (14.97 ha). Both the maps are not available on HMDA official website. At present, the lake is spread over 37-acre (0.15 km^{2}).

== Present status ==
The lake is gradually being destroyed and depleted reportedly due to encroachment from various builders, private residential projects and construction of roads. Sewage is also discharged into the lake which was once hosting various migratory birds and had rich aquatic life. The lake has been handed over to Wipro as part of their CSR programme for rejuvenation and since then is also known as Wipro Lake. Due to dumping of garbage, the lake still remains heavily polluted. The GHAC (Great Hyderabad Adventure Club) has been carrying out clean sweep days on the lake shore in 2013 and 2014.

== Tourism ==
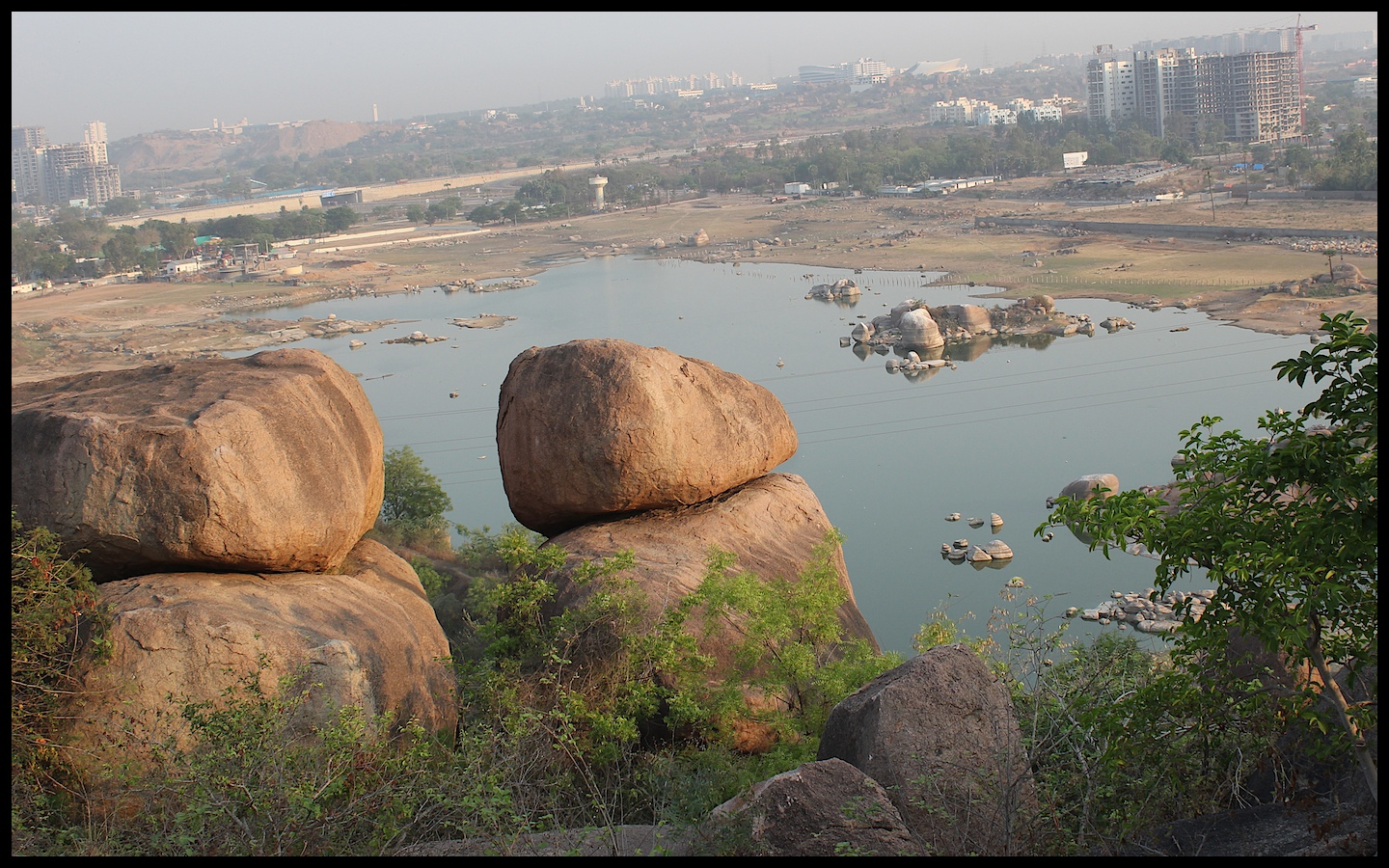
Khajaguda Hills (Fakhruddin Gutta)

With the Khajaguda Hills (Fakhruddin Gutta) to the South of the lake, the site is a popular spot for outdoor activities, such as hiking and bouldering. Fakhruddin Gutta granite rock formations (popularly known as Khajaguda Hills) are as old as 2.5 billion years. Khajaguda Rock Formation, which is prehistoric heritage site, is spread across 180-acre (0.73 km^{2}). The tomb of Saint Hazrat Baba Fakhruddin Aulia — spiritual mentor of Ala-ud-Din Bahman Shah (founder of the Bahmani Kingdom) who was buried here in 1353 AD; an over 800-year-old Annatha Padmanabha Swamy Temple and a cave where the revered saint, Meher Baba had meditated are situated on Khajaguda Hills (Fakhruddin Gutta).

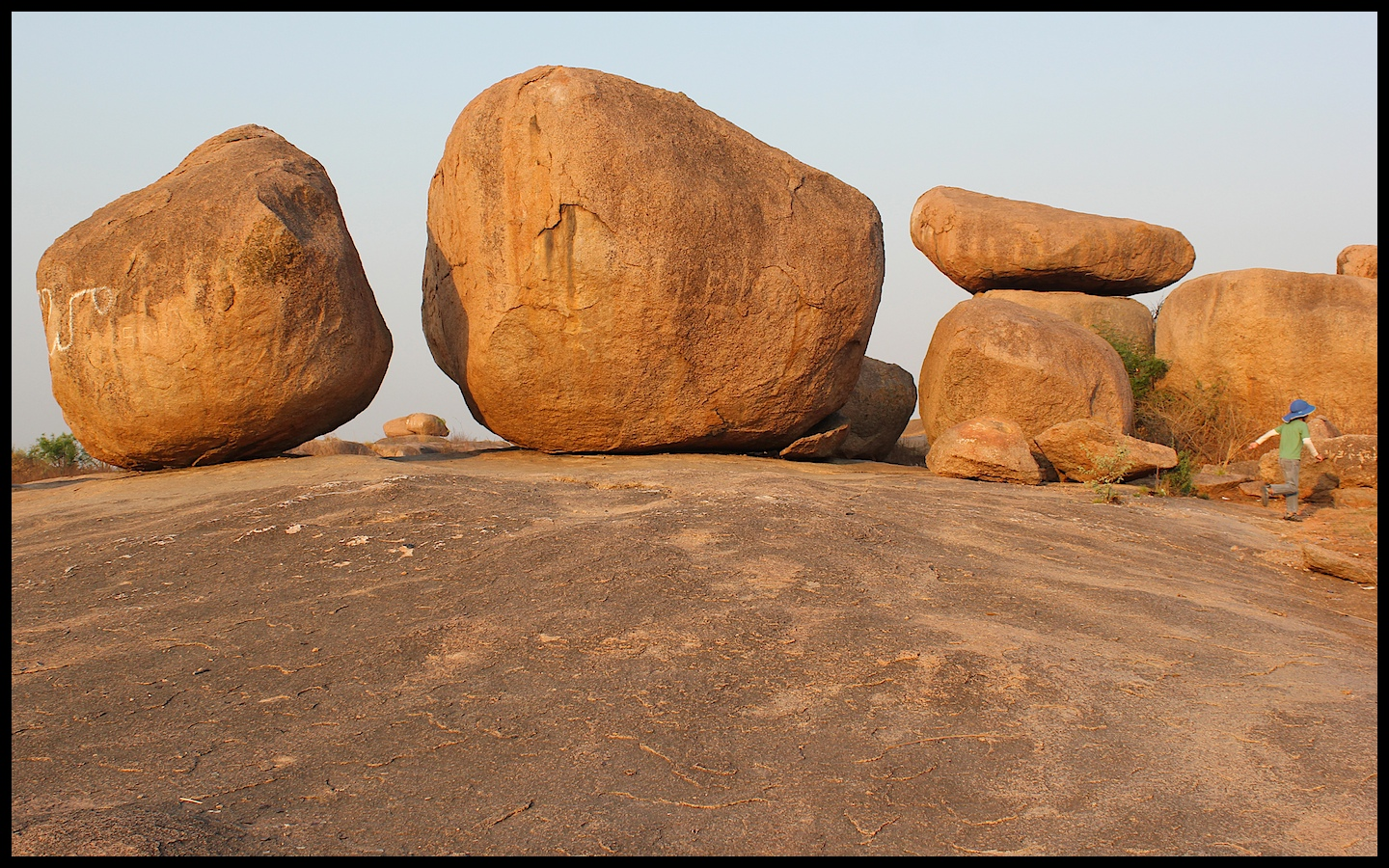
Rocks Fakhruddin Gutta Hyderabad

In the beginning of 2019, some illegal quarrying was carried out, and parts of the boulders have been destroyed, even though the High Court directed the Greater Hyderabad Municipal Corporation and Hyderabad Metropolitan Development Authority to ensure that the boulders were not damaged. In October 2023, Hyderabad Metropolitan Development Authority (HMDA) started work to fence the 2.5 billion-year-old Khajaguda rock formations and limiting access to motorists, visitors.

Outer Ring Road -Lanco Hills link road is under construction as part of Corridor 39B. This 3.89 km long link road is constructed alongside the Khajaguda Heritage Rock Formation.

== See also ==
- Manikonda
- Society to Save Rocks
- Manikonda Cheruvu (Yellamma Cheruvu)
