= Dammaiguda =

Dammaiguda Dammaigudem
- Town
- Location in Telangana, India Dammaiguda (India)
- Coordinates: 17°30′N 78°35′E
- Country: India
- State: Telangana

Government
  - Type: Mayor-council
  - Body: Dammaiguda municipality
- Elevation: 533 m (1,749 ft)

Languages
  - Official: Telugu
- Time zone: UTC+5:30 (IST)
- PIN: 500 083
- Telephone code: 040
- Vehicle registration: TS 08 XX XXXX
- Sex ratio: 1:1(approx) ♂/♀

Dammaiguda (formally known as Dammaigudem, which was earlier a hamlet in Nagaram Revenue Village and later is an outer suburb of Hyderabad in Medchal-Malkajgiri district in Telangana, India. It falls under Keesara mandal. It is a residential neighbourhood.

Kapra, Nagaram, Ahmadguda is neatest localities near this place.

== Administration ==
Newly merged village's in Dammaiguda Municipality.

- Keesara
- Ankireddypalli
- Yadgarpally
- Narsampally
- Cheeriyal
- Thimmaipalle
