= Kachivani Singaram =

- Village
- Country: India
- State: Telangana

Languages
  - Official: Telugu
- Time zone: UTC+5:30 (IST)
- PIN: 500088
- Telephone code: 08415
- Vehicle registration: TS 11 X XXXX

Kachavani Singaram is a village in Ranga Reddy district in Telangana, India. It falls under Ghatkesar mandal and is located on the banks of the Musi River.

== Climate ==
Kachavani Singaram has a moderate climate. In the winter, temperatures range between 18°C and 28°C, while summers are warmer but tolerable, making it suitable for habitation year-round.

== Culture ==
The residents of Kachavani Singaram primarily speak Telugu, the official language of Telangana. The village reflects a close-knit community culture, with agriculture being one of the significant sources of livelihood.

== Geography ==
Kachavani Singaram is near a number of national highways, including the NH44, NH65, and NH163. The village is bordered by other localities including Boduppal, Kuntloor, and Dwaraka Nagar. It is located on the Musi River.
