= Kesavapur =

Keshwapur
- Village
- Location in Andhra Pradesh, India
- Coordinates: 17.588149°N 78.688994°E
- Country: India
- State: Telangana
- District: Rangareddi
- Mandal: Shamirpet
- Elevation: 533 m (1,749 ft)

Languages
  - Official: Telugu
- Time zone: UTC+5:30 (IST)
- Postal code: 500078
- Vehicle registration: TS

Keshavapur is a village in Rangareddy district in Telangana, India. It falls under Shamirpet mandal. Which is located at 10 km from Keesara mandal and 30 km from Hyderabad.
