= N.F.C.Nagar =

N.F.C.Nagar Colony
- Village
- Country: India
- State: Telangana

Languages
  - Official: Telugu
- Time zone: UTC+5:30 (IST)
- Postal code: 5013001
- Telephone code: 08415
- Vehicle registration: TS 08 X XXXX

N.F.C. Nagar Colony is a village in Ranga Reddy district in Telangana, India. It falls under Ghatkesar mandal.
