= Parvathapur =

Parvathapur Parvathapuram, Peerzadiguda
- Neighbourhood
- Parvathapur
- Interactive map of Parvathapur
- Coordinates: 17°23′N 78°36′E
- Country: India
- State: Telangana

Government
  - Type: Peerzadiguda Municipal Corporation

Languages
  - Official: Telugu
- Time zone: UTC+5:30 (IST)
- PIN: 500098
- Telephone code: 040
- Vehicle registration: TS 29 X XXXX
- Lok Sabha constituency: Malkajgiri
- Vidhan Sabha constituency: Medchal

Parvathapur is a locality in Peerzadiguda, a satellite city of Hyderabad, Telangana, India.

It falls under Medipally, Telangana mandal of Medchal district and is administered by Peerzadiguda municipal corporation(PMC), which is one of the fastest growing residential areas of Hyderabad Metropolitan Region.

== Etymology ==
Parvathapur is portmanteau of two Telugu words: Parvatha and pur, translating to "Mountain settlement".

Parvathapur was merged with Peerzadiguda gram panchayat in 2016 to form Peerzadiguda Municipality which was later upgraded to municipal corporation in 2019.

== Institutions ==
Aurora’s Technological & Research Institute(ATRI) is located in Parvathapur.

The upcoming new Rachakonda Police Commissionerate campus in Medipally mandal is situated in Parvathapur.

== Religious Places ==
Sri Lakshmi Narasimha Swamy Temple located in Parvathapur is one of the well known religious places.

== Transport ==
Uppal metro station is around 5 km from Parvathapur.

Bus No: 284P - Deccan article Route: Pratap Singaram → Peerzadiguda Kaman Road → Uppal Cross Road. Runs every 30 minutes
