= Narapally =

- Village
- Country: India
- State: Telangana

Government
  - Type: Municipality
  - Body: Hyderabad Metropolitan Development Authority

Languages
  - Official: Telugu
- Time zone: UTC+5:30 (IST)
- Postal code: 500088
- Telephone code: 040
- Vehicle registration: TS 08 XX XXXX
- Website: https://pocharammunicipality.telangana.gov.in

Narapally is a village under Pocharam Municipality in Medchal-Malkajgiri District in Telangana, India. It falls under Ghatkesar mandal. Narapally is an upcoming residential and commercial suburban area due to its close proximity to Singapore Township and Raheja Mindspace. It is on the National Highway 163.

== Residential and commercial area ==
Due to its close proximity to the information technology hub of Raheja Mindspace, Infosys SEZ, Singapore Township, Venkatadri Township and to Ghatkesar, Narapally is an upcoming residential and commercial area. Major residential projects are undergoing construction in and around Narapally.

== Location ==
Narapally is very near to Ghatkesar and 8 kilometers from Uppal X Road and 1.5 Kilometres from Singapore township and Raheja Mindspace IT Park, Pocharam.

== Education ==
Narapally is a major educational hub with several degree colleges, junior colleges and schools.

It is home to Nalla Narasimha Reddy Engineering College and Siddhartha College of Engineering.

Other major schools in the area include Rotterdam International School, Nalla Malla Reddy Foundation School, and Tejasvi Vidyaranya.

== Transport ==
Many buses ply into several colonies of Narapally. Narapally is well connected by the state-owned bus service, TSRTC. TSRTC buses with Route Number 280 arrive every 10 minutes on NH163. It is well connected with the rest of the city, as it is on a connecting road between Uppal and Ghatkesar.

== Bank ==
Local banks include Allahabad Bank, Canara Bank, and State Bank of India, Korremula Branch.
