= Aushapur =

Coordinates: 17°27′N 78°44′E

- Village
- Interactive map of Aushapur
- Country: India
- State: Telangana

Government
  - Body: Ghatkesar Municipality

Area
  - Total: 9.19 km^{2} (3.55 sq mi)

Population
  - Total: 3,266
  - Density: 355/km^{2} (920/sq mi)

Languages
  - Official: Telugu
- Time zone: UTC+5:30 (IST)
- PIN: 501301
- Telephone code: 08415
- Vehicle registration: TS 08 XX XXXX

Aushapur is a village in Medchal–Malkajgiri district in Telangana, India. It falls under Ghatkesar Mandal.
