= Venkatapur, Ranga Reddy district =

Venkatapur
- Village
- Country: India
- State: Telangana

Languages
  - Official: Telugu
- Time zone: UTC+5:30 (IST)
- Postal code: 500088
- Telephone code: 040
- Vehicle registration: TS 08 XX XXXX

Venkatapur is a village in ghatkesar mandal and medchal malkajgiri district in Telangana, India. It falls under Ghatkesar mandal.
