= Edulabad Lake =

Lake in India

- Lakshminarayana Cheruvu
- Location within Telangana
- Location: Ghatkeser, Telangana, India
- Coordinates: 17.42483°N 78.69560°E
- Basin countries: India
- Surface area: 5 km^{2} (1.9 sq mi)
- Surface elevation: 1,759 ft (536 m)
- Settlements: Hyderabad, Ghatkeser

Edulabad Lake, also known as Lakshminarayana Cheruvu is a lake located near Ghatkeser, Hyderabad. It is also known as Edulabad water reservoir. This 600-acre-plus lake is located about 16 km from the city center of Secunderabad. Industrial sewage and waste from Jawaharnagar dumpyard have polluted this lake, killing fish and causing illness in lakeside communities in 2002. The lake has turned pink in color due to the chemicals in the sewage industries.
