= Thimmaipalle =

Thimmaipalli
- Village
- Interactive map of Thimmaipalli
- Location in Telangana, India Thimmaipalli (India)
- Coordinates: 17.545731°N 78.616446°E
- Country: India
- State: Telangana
- District: Medchal-Malkajgiri
- Metro: Hyderabad

Population (2011)
  - Total: 1,021

Languages
  - Official: Telugu
- Time zone: UTC+5:30 (IST)
- PIN: 501301
- Vehicle registration: TS08

Thimmaipalli is a village in Keesara mandal of Medchal-Malkajgiri district in the Indian state of Telangana. It falls under Keesara Division-1 of Malkajgiri Municipal Corporation. It is famous for Sri Prasanna Anjaneya swamy temple and Hill side Sri Venugopala swamy temple. As of the 2011 Census of India, it had a population of 1021.
