= Manikonda =

- Neighbourhood
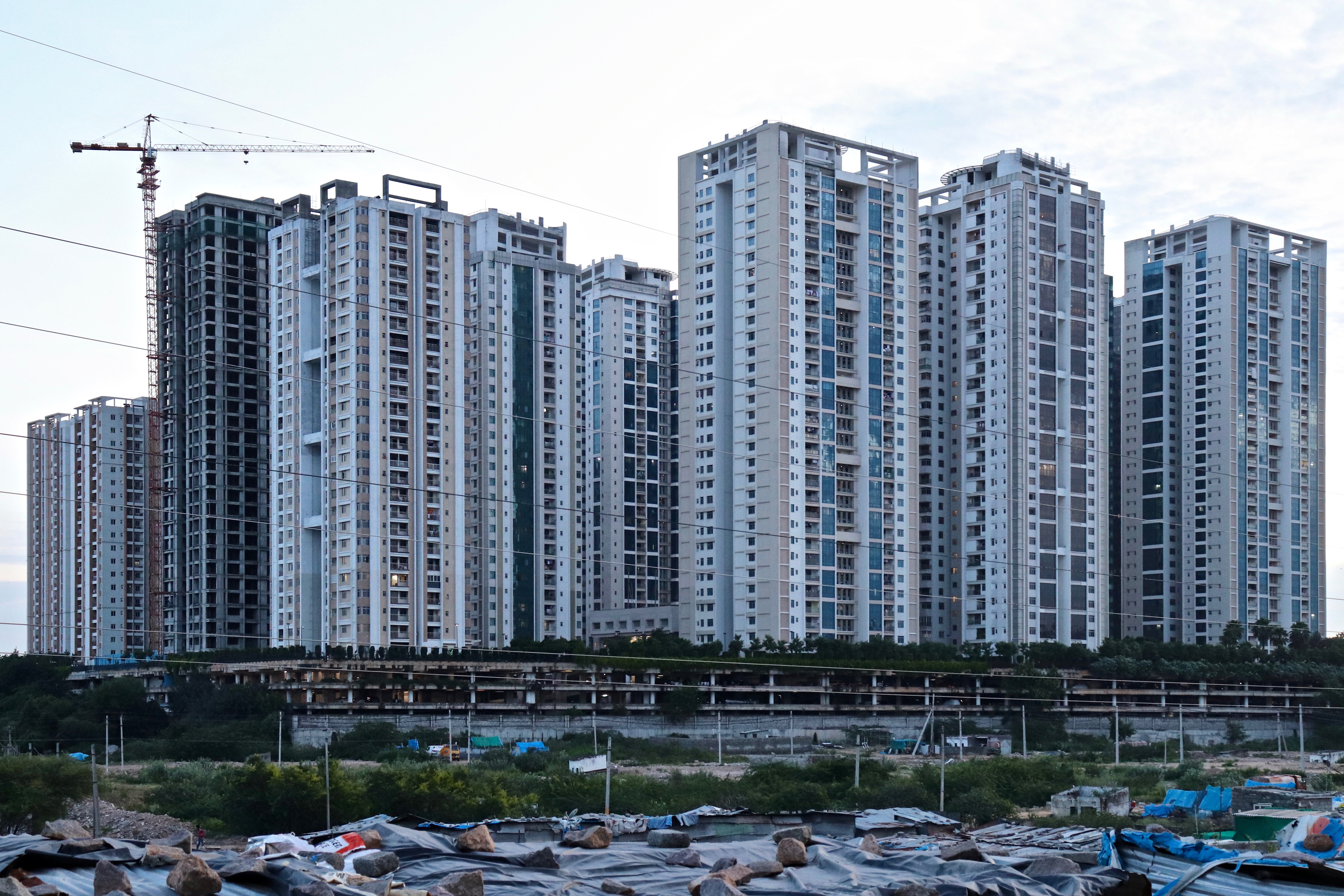
- LANCO Hills

- Location in Hyderabad, India Manikonda (India)
- Coordinates: 17.406994°N 78.370085°E
- Country: India
- State: Telangana
- District: Rangareddy
- Metro: Hyderabad

Government
  - Body: Municipality

Languages
  - Official: Telugu and Urdu
- Time zone: UTC+5:30 (IST)
- PIN: 500 089
- Vehicle registration: TG
- Lok Sabha constituency: Chevella
- Vidhan Sabha constituency: Rajendra Nagar
- Planning agency: Manikonda Municipality
- Website: manikondamunicipality.telangana.gov.in

Manikonda is a commercial hub and a residential neighbourhood in Hyderabad, Telangana, India. This suburb has boomed in recent years due to the presence of leading software company headquarters in the area as well as Lanco hills, a luxury hi-rise residential project, and an upcoming Chitrapuri Colony residential layout for Telugu cinema workers.

== Sights ==
- Manikonda Cheruvu (Yellama Cheruvu) is located next to Lanco Hills Residential Apartments.
- Khajaguda Lake and Khajaguda Hills are a popular spot for outdoor activities, such as hiking and bouldering. Located in Khajaguda area.
- Mushkin Cheruvu, near Puppalaguda - Manikonda Main Road.
- Neknampur Lake.

== Development ==
Manikonda is the site of significant commercial and residential development. The area is sought after for its posh locale. Several software professionals who work at Gachibowli and Hi-tech City are purchasing flats and land in Manikonda. In February 2022, a two-member bench of Supreme Court of India passed judgement that Manikonda village jagir comprising prime land of 1,654-acre (6.69 km^{2}) and 32 guntas of land belongs to Government of Telangana, setting aside the orders of the erstwhile Andhra Pradesh High Court. The land is free from any encumbrance.

The area's infrastructure, shopping and entertainment are rapidly growing. The highways leading to Manikonda include one from Darga via OU Colony and another from Sheikpet via Sports complex and filter beds. It consists of two revenue villages named Manikonda and Puppalaguda. Several dozen towers of the multi-billion dollar Lanco hills as well as Chitrapuri Colony are located in Manikonda village. To reach this bustling locale from the airport, one should exit from Outer Ring Road at Nanakramguda/Gachibowli junction and take Lanco Hills Road. DivyaSree TechRidge is a 45-acre (0.18 km^{2}) project near Lanco Hills. Several companies likes Accenture are located in this. There are many parks in Manikonda Municipality like Netaji Park located in Alkaoor Township, Puppalguda. The area also has many gyms like Hyki gym in Green Living Apartments, cult gym in Panchavati colony, etc.

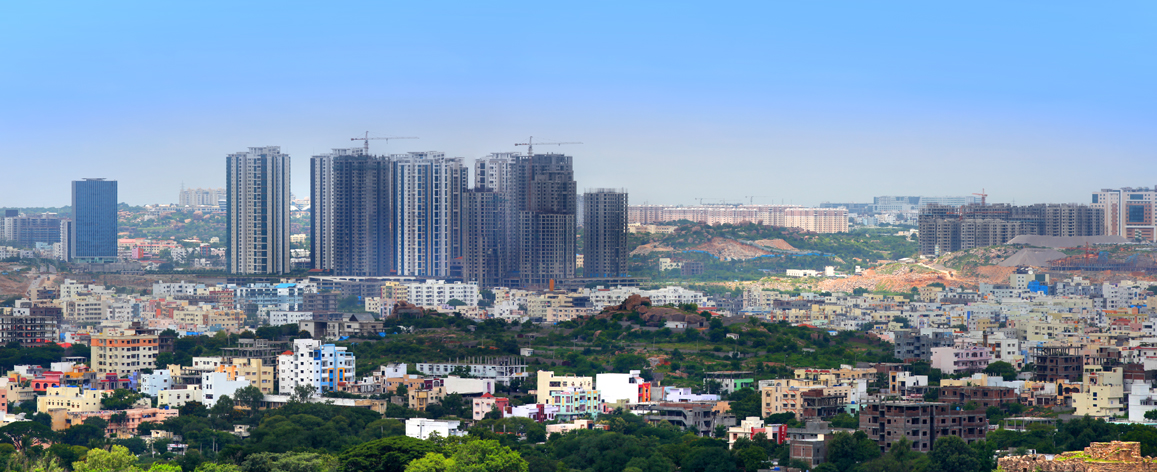
Panorama showing Manikonda and Lanco Hills under construction in 2012
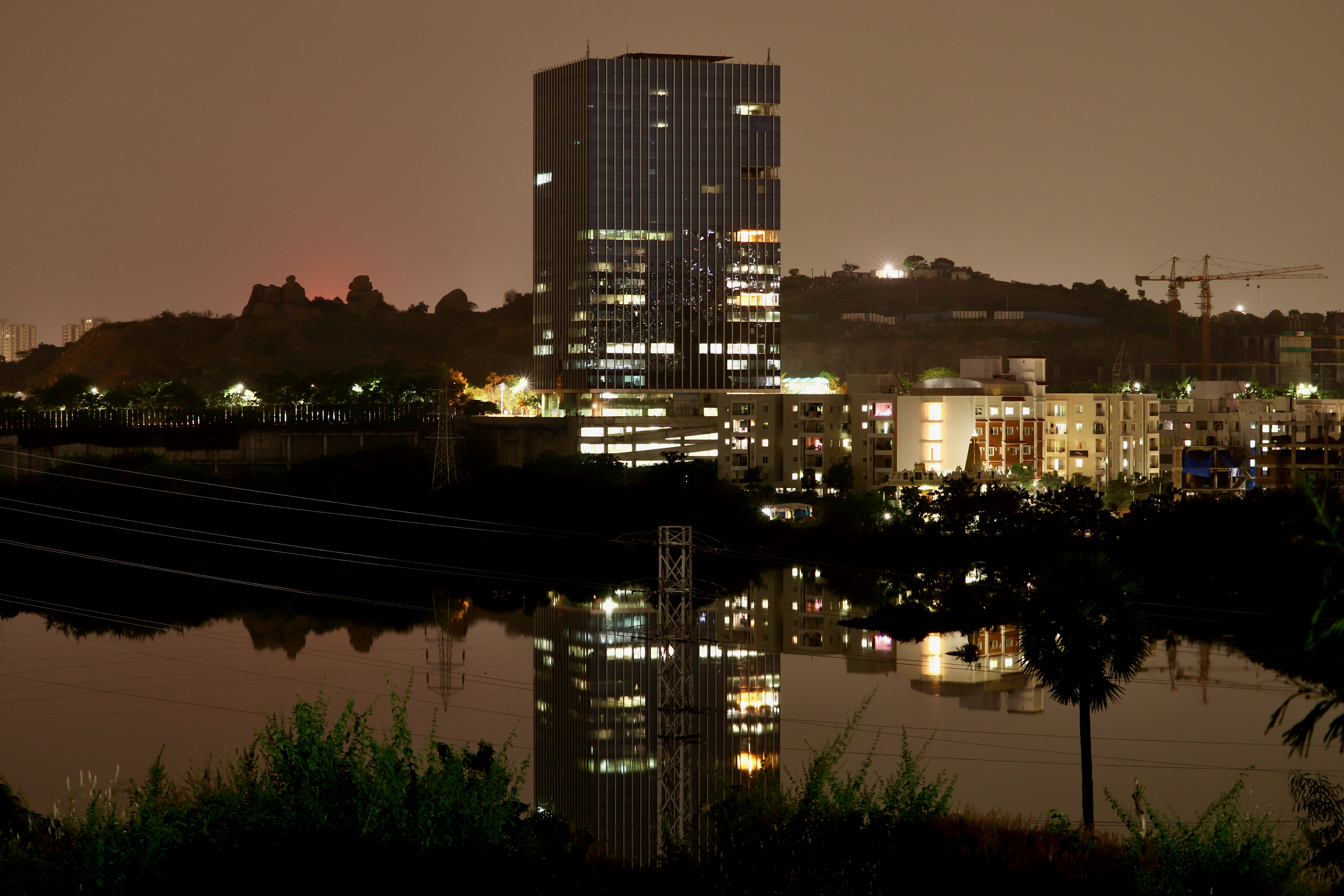
Sutherland building near LANCO Hills

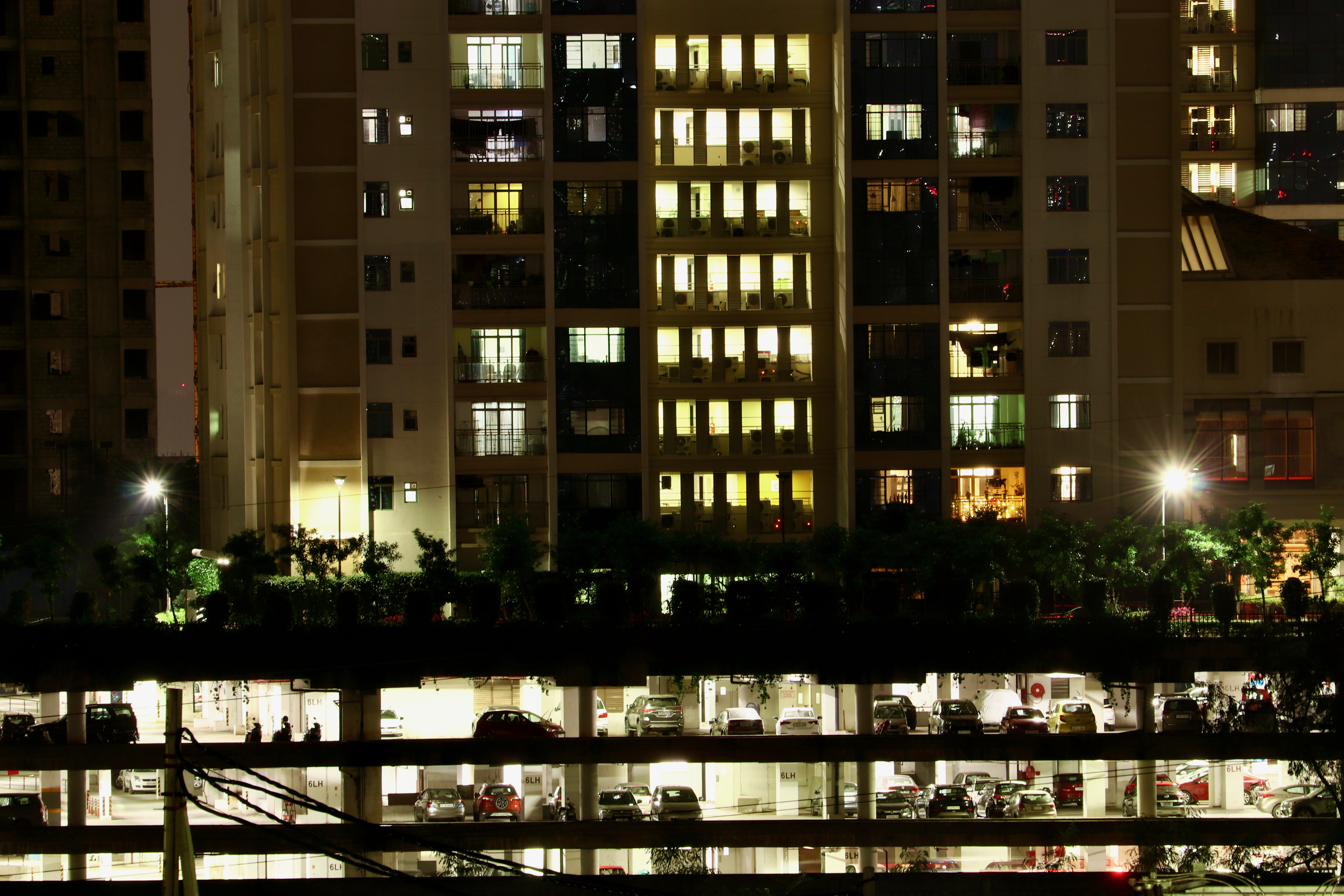
LANCO Hills High-rise complex

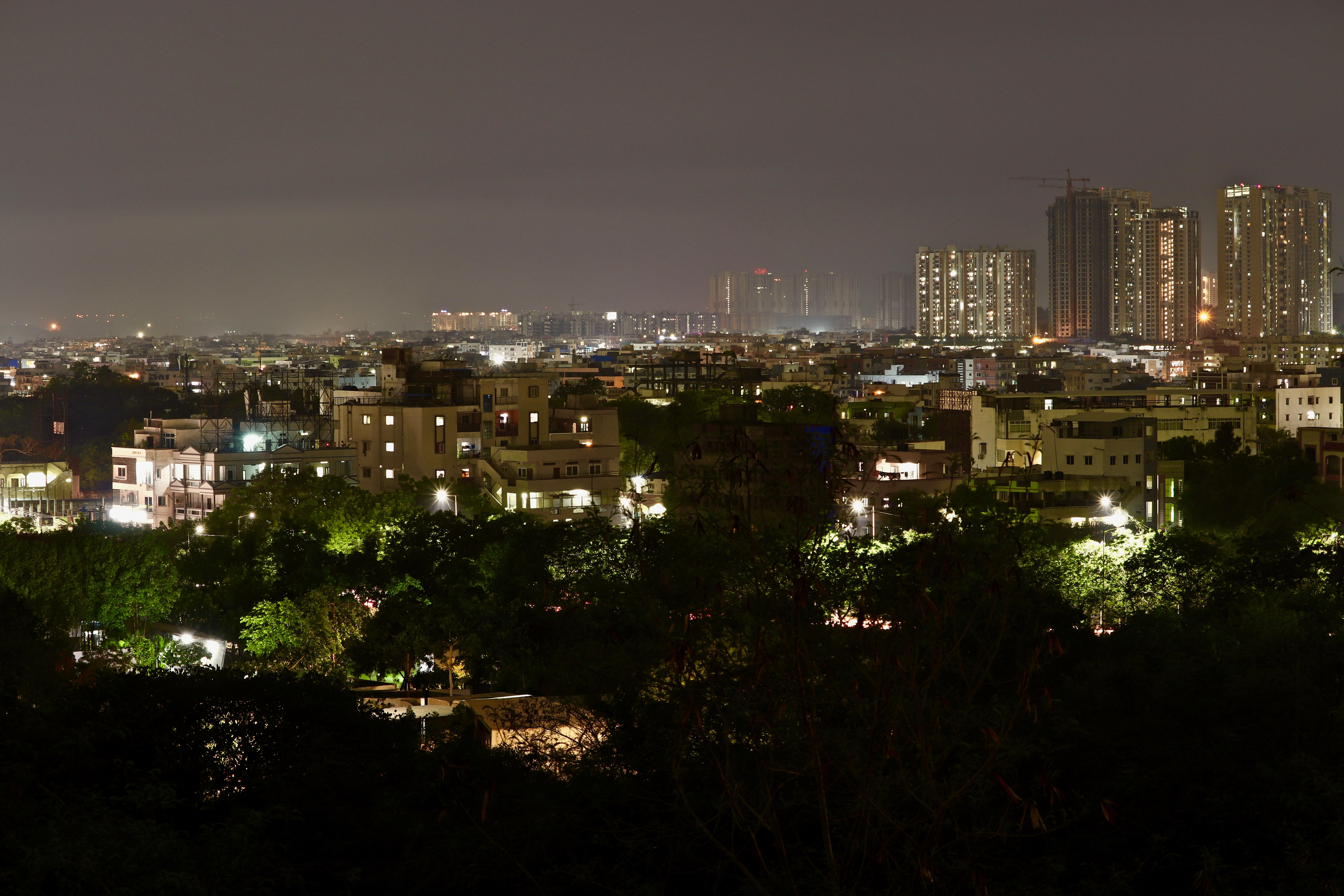
LANCO Hills from Filmnagar

== Transport ==
The closest Metro Train station is Raidurg metro station. Outer Ring Road -Lanco Hills link road is under construction as part of Corridor 39B. This 3.89 km long link road is constructed alongside the Khajaguda Heritage Rock Formation.

It is well connected by TSRTC buses that run from Mehdipatnam to Manikonda Marri Chettu Junction, and Lanco Hills, bus no. Bus 47L. runs from [secundrabad].

It's easily accessible to tourist attractions such as Khajaguda Historic Rock Formation next to Lanco Hills, Golkonda, Qutb Shahi tombs, Osman Sagar lake near Gandipet, Outer Ring Road, Hyderabad, Gachibowli Athletic Stadium, Gachibowli Indoor Stadium, and HITEC City.

== See also ==
- Khajaguda
- Puppalaguda
- List of tallest buildings in Hyderabad
- Narsingi
- Kokapet
