= Pocharam, Medak district =

Pocharam Pocharam Municipality
- Village
- Location in Hyderabad Telangana Location in India
- Coordinates: 17.425460°N 78.644985°E
- Country: India
- State: Telangana

Government
  - Type: Municipality
  - Body: Municipal Administration and Urban Development Department, Telangana

Area
  - Total: 20.74 km^{2} (8.01 sq mi)

Population (2011)
  - Total: 21,946
  - Density: 1,058/km^{2} (2,741/sq mi)

Languages
  - Official: Telugu
- Time zone: UTC+5:30 (IST)
- PIN code: 500088
- Telephone code: 040
- Vehicle registration: TS 08 XX XXXX
- Website: https://pocharammunicipality.telangana.gov.in

Pocharam is a satellite town of Hyderabad. Pocharam is a village located in the Medak district of the Indian state of Telangana. It is situated approximately 60 kilometers north-east of the state capital, Hyderabad.

== History ==
Historically, Pocharam has been a center of activity for several centuries. The village's roots can be traced back to the period of the Kakatiya dynasty, which ruled much of the Deccan region from the 12th to the 14th century. During this time, the area was known for its agricultural prosperity and strategic importance.

== Economy ==
The presence of Warangal highway and metro station at Uppal has led to large scale boom in real-estate activity in and adjoining areas of Narapally, Boduppal and Peerzadiguda. It is home to integrated residential and commercial project, Singapore Township aka Sanskruthi Township. The software company, Infosys, has its 447-acre second campus in Hyderabad, here known as Prakriti Park. This facility is an SEZ and, when constructed fully, it will be able to accommodate 25,000 employees. The campus is Infosys' world's biggest campus. Next to this is Raheja Mind Space IT Park in 100 acres. Companies like Genpact, Axis Bank and other IT and ITES companies have set up their offices in Raheja Mind Space.

The local economy of Pocharam is primarily based on agriculture, with the fertile lands surrounding the village supporting the cultivation of various crops. Agriculture remains a source of livelihood for the majority of the population.

== Tourism ==
=== Pocharam Wildlife Sanctuary ===
One of the landmarks in Pocharam is the Pocharam Wildlife Sanctuary, which spans an area of several square kilometers. The sanctuary is home to diverse flora and fauna, including various species of migratory birds that visit the region during certain times of the year.

=== Temples and architecture ===
Additionally, Pocharam is known for its ancient temples and architecture. The village houses several temples dedicated to various Hindu deities. These temples, often built in traditional South Indian architectural styles, attract devotees and art enthusiasts from different parts of the country.
