= Ismailkhanguda =

Ismailkhanguda is a village in Medchal district in Telangana, India. It falls under Ghatkesar mandal.
