= Cheeriyal =

- Village
- Country: India
- State: Telangana

Languages
  - Official: Telugu
- Time zone: UTC+5:30 (IST)
- Telephone code: 040
- Vehicle registration: TS-08 X XXXX
- Sex ratio: 1:1(approx) ♂/♀
- Website: telangana.gov.in

Cheeriyal or Cheeryal is a village in Medchal-Malkajgiri district in Telangana, India. It falls under Keesara mandal.
