= Rambally =

Rambally is a surname. Notable people with the surname include:

- Dinesh Rambally, Trinidadian politician
- Menissa Rambally, Saint Lucian politician
- Janine Compton-Rambally, Saint Lucian politician

== See also ==
- Rampally
