= Keesaragutta Temple =

Hindu temple in Telangana, India

- Kesarigiri
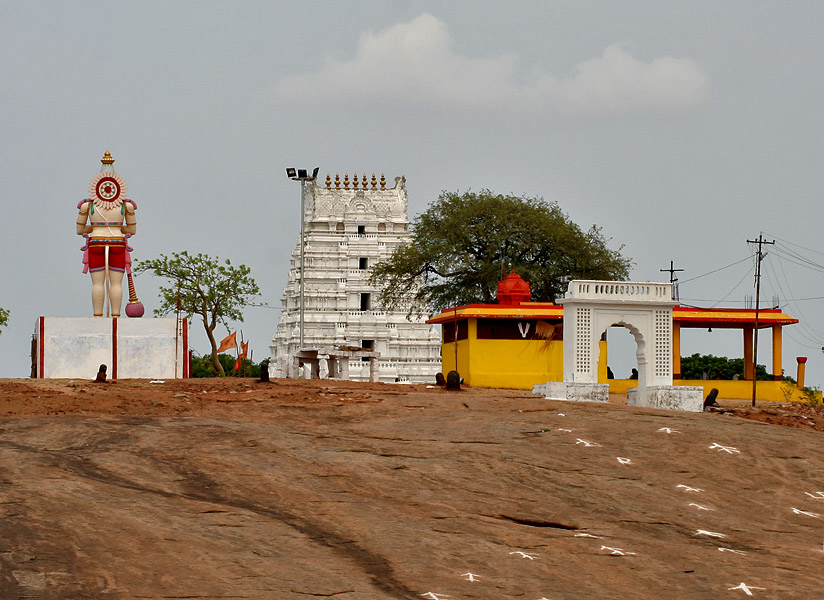
- Keesaragutta Temple as viewed from the staircase on the hill.

Religion
- Affiliation: Hinduism
- District: Medchal-Malkajgiri
- Deity: Shiva
- Festival: Maha Shivaratri

Location
- Location: Keesara Village, Medchal-Malkajgiri District
- State: Telangana
- Country: India

Architecture
- Type: Dravidian architecture
- Creator: Rama
- Established: 100 BCE

Keesaragutta Temple is a Hindu temple dedicated to Lord Shiva and his consort, Parvati, at Keesaragutta, Keesara Village, Medchal-Malkajgiri district, Telangana, India. It is located on a small hillock, roughly 30 km (18 miles) from central Hyderabad, and 12 km (7 mi) from ECIL. The temple draws several lakh devotees for the Maha Shivaratri festival, as well as during the month of Kartika on the Hindu calendar.

On top of one of the rock-cut caves around the temple, an early Telugu inscription, read as 'Thalachuvanru', was found. Dated to the 5th century CE, it is the earliest known Telugu inscription in the Telangana state.

== Legend ==
Legend has it that Rama installed the lingam here to atone for the sin of killing Ravana (who was a bramhin by birth, but a demon by nature). He selected this beautiful valley, surrounded by hills and verdant greenery, and ordered Hanuman to bring a lingam from Varanasi (the holy city of Kashi or Benares; believed to be Shiva's favourite place). Hanuman was late in arriving with the requested lingam and, as the auspicious hour was nearing, Shiva himself appeared before Rama and presented a lingam to him. Thus, the lingam in the temple is called a Swayambhu Linga. It is also called Ramalingeswara, as Rama had installed the lingam.

Hanuman returned from Varanasi with 101 lingams to choose from, but felt aggrieved at not having his lingam installed; instead, he threw them all over the area. Even to this day, several lingams can be found scattered outside the temple. These lingams are worshipped along with the lingam in the sanctum of the temple, to this day.

To pacify Hanuman, Rama ordained that precedence would be given to him for worship at the temple. He also said that the hillock where the lingam was installed would bear the name Kesarigiri—“Hanuman, the son of Kesari”. Over a period of time, it has colloquially transformed and is now known as Keesara, and the hill itself as Keesaragutta. Ever since, rituals have followed the command of Rama.

== Archaeological Excavations ==
Exploration and Excavations were conducted by the archaeological department in the surroundings of Keesaragutta Temple. Many ruins of brick structures and Shiva Lingas were found on the hill north of the temple, and on a hillock near the water’s edge. The ruins and artifacts dated to the era of the Chalukyan Empire. Fortification walls, Yagasala and prayer halls were all excavated there. Some vestige remnants and rock-cut cisterns were found on the hills, an indication that Jainism and Buddhism flourished there simultaneously together. On 18 October 2014, twelve idols of Jain Tirthankara dating back to the 4th-5th century were found near the temple steps at a depth of one foot which proves that Jainism co-existed along with Hinduism at Keesaragutta during the time of Vishnukundinas in 4-5th century.

On top of one of the rock-cut caves around the temple, an early Telugu label inscription reading as 'Thulachuvanru' can be noticed. On the basis of paleography, the inscription is dated around the 4th to 5th centuries CE. It is the earliest known inscription with Telugu words from the Telangana region.
