= Medipally, Telangana =

Medipally
- Mandal
- Interactive map of Medipally
- Country: India
- State: Telangana

Government
  - Type: Peerzadiguda Municipal Corporation

Languages
  - Official: Telugu
- Time zone: UTC+5:30 (IST)
- Telephone code: 040
- Vehicle registration: TS-08 X XXXX

Medipally is a town located in Medchal Malkajgiri district of the Indian state of Telangana. It is the mandal headquarters of Medipally mandal in Keesara revenue division. It is also a part of Hyderabad Metropolitan Development Authority.

Medipally town is a part of Peerzadiguda Municipal corporation.

== Villages in Medipally mandal ==
- Bibi shaeb Maqta
- Boduppal
- Chengicherla (part of Boduppal municipal corporation)
- Gulamaliguda
- Medipally
- Parvathapur
- Peerzadiguda
