= Singapore Township, Hyderabad =

Integrated township in Telangana, India

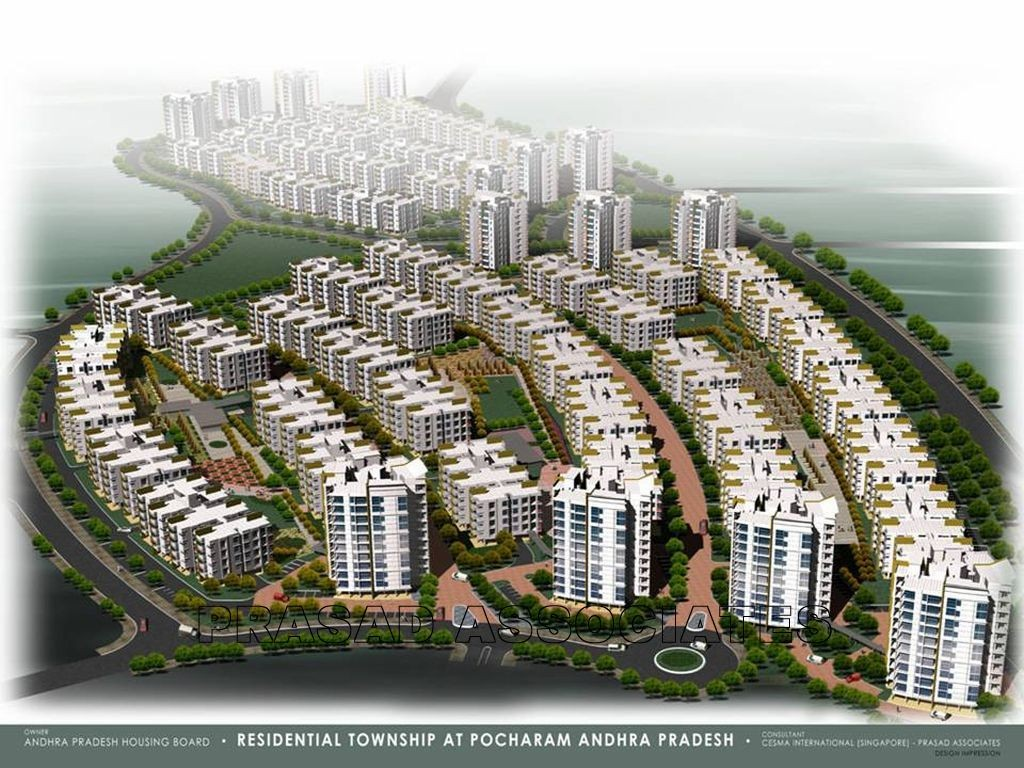

Singapore Township aka Sanskruti Township is an integrated township located in Pocharam, Hyderabad, Telangana, India. Developed as a joint venture involving the Telangana Housing Board (formerly Andhra Pradesh Housing Board) with planning by the Singapore firm CESMA International, the project comprises roughly 2,000 apartments across multiple blocks. It is situated near the Infosys SEZ campus.
