= Narsampally =

Narsampally Narsampally
- Village
- Country: India
- State: Telangana

Population (2011)
  - Total: 1,320

Languages
  - Official: Telugu
- Time zone: UTC+5:30 (IST)
- Telephone code: 040
- Vehicle registration: TS 36 XXXX
- Sex ratio: 1:1(approx) ♂/♀

Narsampally is a village in Medak district in Telangana, India. It falls under Toopran mondal.
