= Peerzadiguda =

- City
- Location in Telangana State, India Peerzadiguda (Telangana) Peerzadiguda (India)
- Coordinates: 17.3974°N 78.5783°E
- Country: India
- State: Telangana
- District: Medchal-Malkajgiri
- Mandal: Medipally, Telangana
- Metro: Hyderabad Metropolitan Region

Government
  - Type: Municipal Corporation
  - Body: Peerzadiguda Municipal Corporation

Area
  - Total: 10.5 km^{2} (4.1 sq mi)

Population (Census 2011)
  - Total: 51,689
  - Estimate (2020): 75,000
  - Density: 4,920/km^{2} (12,700/sq mi)

Languages
  - Official: Telugu
- Time zone: UTC+5:30 (IST)
- PIN: 500098
- Telephone code: 040
- Vehicle registration: TS 08
- Lok Sabha constituency: Malkajgiri
- Vidhan Sabha constituency: Medchal
- Website: peerzadigudamunicipality.telangana.gov.in

Peerzadiguda is a satellite city of Hyderabad and municipal corporation located in Medchal-Malkajgiri district in the state of Telangana, India.

It is one of the fastest growing residential areas of Hyderabad.

== Government ==
Peerzadiguda municipality is the civic body of the town. On 11 April 2016, the gram panchayat of Peerzadiguda was upgraded to Peerzadiguda municipality.

Peerzadiguda is a newly constituted Municipality by merging (3) Grampanchayaths i.e., Peerzadiguda, Medipally, Telangana and Parvathapur having total population 51,689 as per 2011 census and present projected population is 75,000. Area of the Urban Local body is 10.5 km^{2} and the total House holds are 23,300.

The geographical Located of Peerzadiguda Municipality is at longitude of 17.3974308 and Latitude 17.3974308.

On 19 July 2019, Peerzadiguda municipality was upgraded to municipal corporation by Telangana government.
