= Ghatkesar =

Ghatkesar Ghatakēshwaram (Ghatkēshwar)
- Ghatkesar Railway Station

- Location in Hyderabd Telangana Location in India
- Coordinates: 17.4494°N 78.6853°E
- Country: India
- State: Telangana
- District: Medchal-Malkajgiri district
- Metro: Hyderabad
- Named for: Ghattu Maisaamma

Government
  - Type: Municipality
  - Body: Ghatkesar Municipality

Area
  - Total: 13.83 km^{2} (5.34 sq mi)

Population
  - Total: 28,063
  - Density: 2,029/km^{2} (5,255/sq mi)

Languages
  - Official: Telugu
- Time zone: UTC+5:30 (IST)
- PIN: 501301
- Vehicle registration: 08
- Website: ghatkesarmunicipality.telangana.gov.in

Ghatkesar is a satellite town of Hyderabad in the Medchal-Malkajgiri district of Telangana, India. It is the mandal headquarters of Ghatkesar Mandal in the Keesara revenue division. Located in the outer suburbs of Hyderabad, it is a part of the Hyderabad Metropolitan Development Authority.

== Geography ==
Ghatkesar is located at 17.4494°N 78.6853°E.

== Economy ==
The presence of Warangal highway, Outer ring road and The Metro in Uppal have led to a large-scale boom in real-estate activity in and adjoining areas of Rampally, Narapally, Boduppal and Peerzadiguda. Ghatkesar has primary health care. It also has plenty of electrical, automobile, electronics and cloth shops. It has a bus stop and a railway station with MMTS connectivity that provides easy connectivity between Ghatkesar and other places.

== Educational institutions ==
Ghatkesar has many schools and colleges. There are about six engineering colleges and 11 high schools within a ten-kilometer radius.

Engineering colleges (<10 km)

- Sreenidhi Institute of Technology and Science (SNIST), Yamnampet
- Anurag University, Venkatapur
- Anurag College of Engineering, Aushapur
- Princeton College of Engineering, Ankushapur
- Krishnamurthy Institute of Technology and Science, Edulabad
- Samskruthi College of Engineering, Ghatkesar

High schools (<10 km)

- Government High School
- Holy Faith Grammer High School
- St. Anthony's High
- Ghatkesar Model High School
- Brilliant Grammer High School
- Rishi High School
- Vignan High School
- Rockwoods International School, Yamnampet
- Kendriya Vidyalaya, NFC Nagar
- Delhi Public School, Ghatkesar
- Rotterdam International School

== Demographics ==
Ghatkesar is the fastest growing mandal in population growth of whole Telangana, with a decadal population growth record of 112%.

=== Administration ===
Ghatkesar is Mandal and Municipality also.

- Ghatkesar municipality has newly merged village's are https://timesofindia.indiatimes.com/city/hyderabad/45-villages-near-orr-merged-with-13-abutting-civic-bodies/articleshow/113044062.cms
- Aushapur
- Ankushapur
- Edulabad
- Madharam
- Ghanpur
- Marpallyguda

== Villages ==
- Edulabad
- Ismailkhanguda

== History & Origin ==
The history of Ghatkesar is deeply connected with Ithihasa-Purana epics, Ancient academic traditions and influential Deccan dynasties. Today, Ghatkesar serves as one of the Hyderabad's major satellite towns, but its foundational roots date back to Treta Yuga & Early Medevial period.

=== The "Ghatika" Connection ===
The history of Ghatkesar tracks how it became a major center for learning under the Vishnukundina dynasty around 5th-7th centuries CE. During Vishnukundina King Indra Bhattaraka Varma rule (around 528-555 CE), the region surrounding the capital at adjacent Keesara was selected for establishing the Ghatikas referring to Ancient Higher Vedic Learning & Philosophy institutions. According to certain historical accounts, the town name is originated or derived from Ghatakeshwara or Ghatakeshwaram, which is the combination of Ghatika(Vedic university) + Eshwara (Lord Shiva).

Local folklore refers to the name Ghatkesar represents: Ghat (Hilly Terrain of Deccan Plateau) and respect to Goddess Maisamma

=== The Vishnukundina Era ===
Around 4th - 5th century CE, Ghatkesar was one of the core parts of Vishnukundina Empire with Socio-Economic and Geogrpahical significance Being close or in proximity to the capital, the Town was main centre of learning and present on the flat lands supported by the Hilltop capital nearby called as 'Keesaragutta'/'Kesarigiri'. Both Pre-Vishnukundina era and Post-Vishnukundina era, Ghatkesar's strategic location remained a valued territory.

=== Divine Connection with Treta Yuga ===
According to the Sthala Purana, Ghatkesar's Spiritual Identity is interlinked with its Geographical Twin Town Keesara which served as a prominent place and witnessed the divine events happened during the Treta Yuga (Within the epic Ramayana. After Ravana got defeated, Lord Rama installed a *Swayambhu* (self-manifested) lingam when Lord Hanuman delayed bringing lingams from Varanasi and had scattered the 101 sacred Shiva Lingams around the hills of Keesaragutta. Then Lord Rama pacified Hanuman by naming the hill tract as Kesarigiri, honoring Lord Hanuman's father, Kesari, serving as the root for the names of 'keesara' and 'Ghatkesar' Towns.
