= Keesara =

Keesara Kesarigiri
- Major Village Temple Town
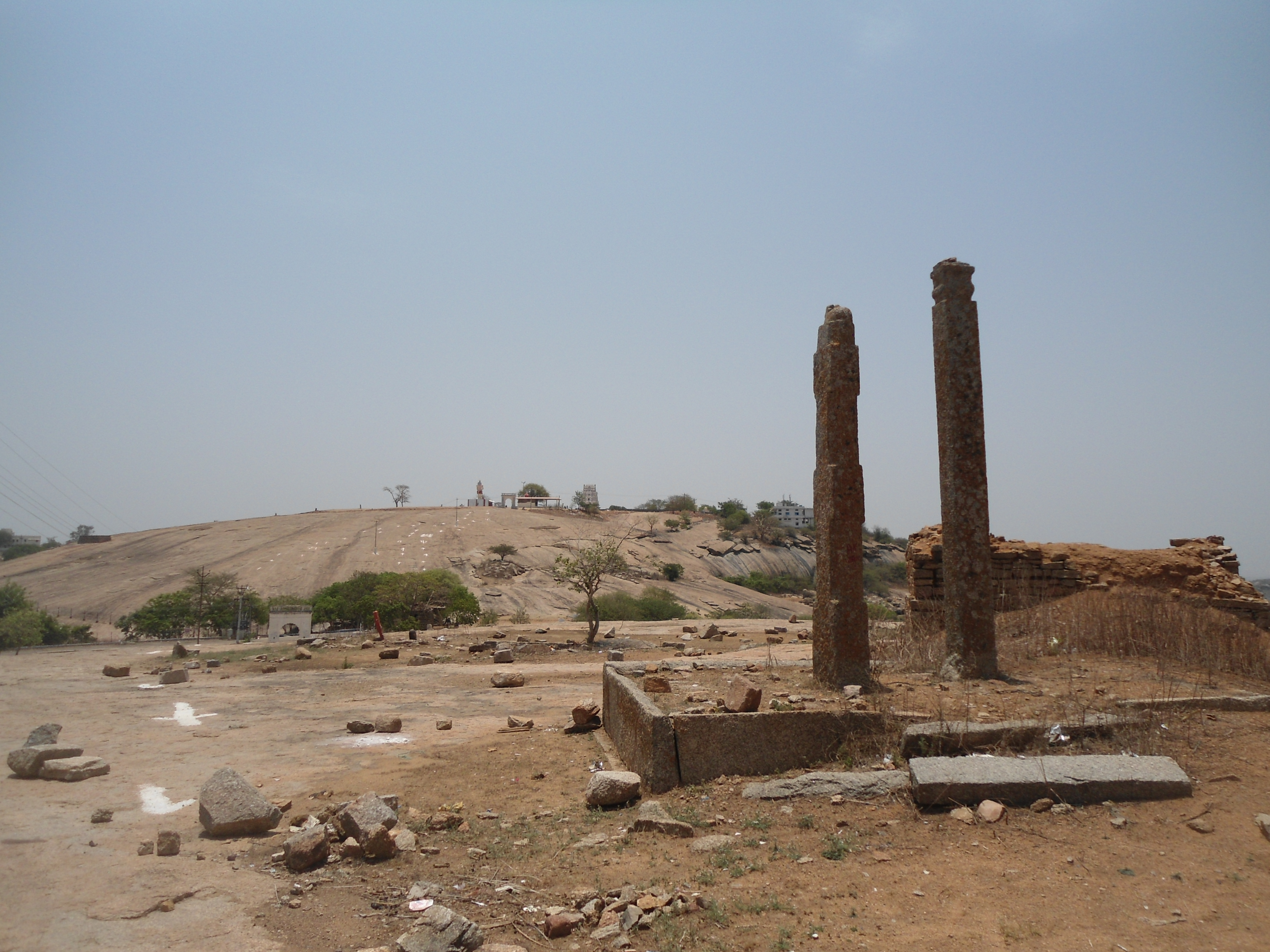
- Keesaragutta temple view from ruins

- Location in Hyderabad Telangana Location in India
- Coordinates: 17.5225°N 78.6678°E
- Country: India
- State: Telangana
- District: Medchal-Malkajgiri district
- Named for: Lord Hanuman

Government
  - Type: Gram Panchayat
  - Body: Keesara Grama Panchayati

Area
  - Total: 20.50 km^{2} (7.92 sq mi)

Population
  - Total: 8,872
  - Density: 1,681/km^{2} (4,350/sq mi)

Languages
  - Official: Telugu
- Time zone: UTC+5:30 (IST)
- Postal code: 501301
- Vehicle registration: TS-08

Keesara, also known by its ancient name Kesarigiri, is a major village and mandal headquarters in the Medchal-Malkajgiri district of the Indian state of Telangana. It is the mandal and divisional headquarters of Keesara mandal in Keesara revenue division and also outer suburb of Hyderabad, also a part of Hyderabad Metropolitan Region. It is located near Outer Ring Road, Hyderabad. It is in the center of Shamirpet - Keesara - Ghatkesar, ECIL - Keesara - Bommalaramaram - M.Turkapalli Routes . It is also a part of Hyderabad Metropolitan Development Authority.

== Administration ==
This Gram Panchayat has Vannigudem Hamlet, Keesaragutta (Uninhabited Ancient village) with Keesara village, comes under Keesara Revenue Village.

== Transportation ==
No railway connections are available in Keesara. TSRTC buses are available from Hyderabad (Secunderabad railway station) and other suburbs like Ghatkesar, Bhongir, Shamirpet, Yadagirigutta.

== Important places ==
- Collectorate Office at Outer Ring road.
- Keesara Police station.
- Keesaragutta Temple.
