= Shadnagar Assembly constituency =

Constituency of the Telangana legislative assembly in India

Coordinates: 17.07°N 78.21°E

Shadnagar
- Constituency No. 84 for the Telangana Legislative Assembly
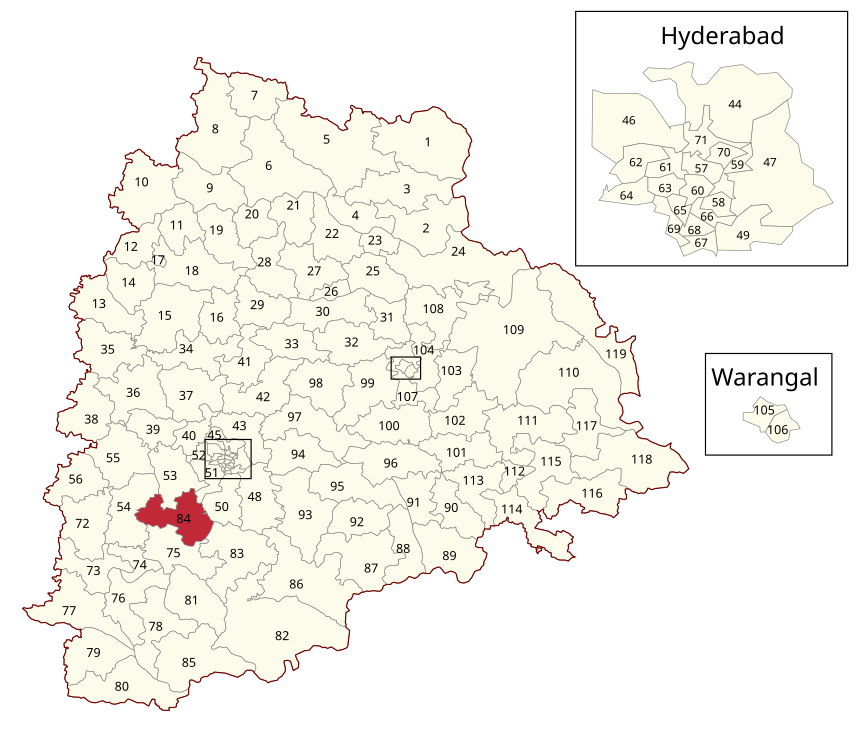
- Location of Shadnagar Assembly constituency within Telangana

Constituency details
- Country: India
- Region: South India
- State: Telangana
- District: Ranga Reddy
- Lok Sabha constituency: Mahabubnagar
- Established: 1951
- Total electors: 1,89,299
- Reservation: None

Member of Legislative Assembly
- 3rd Telangana Legislative Assembly
- Incumbent K. Shankaraiah
- Party: Indian National Congress
- Elected year: 2023

Shadnagar Assembly constituency is a constituency in Ranga Reddy district of Telangana that elects representatives to the Telangana Legislative Assembly in India. It is one of the seven assembly segments of Mahabubnagar Lok Sabha constituency.

K. Shankaraiah of Indian National Congress is currently representing this constituency.

== Mandals ==
The Assembly Constituency presently comprises the following Mandals:

Mandal
Farooqnagar
Kondurg
Kothur
Keshampeta
Nandigam
Chowderguda

== Members of Legislative Assembly ==
Year of election	MLA	Political party
1952	Burgula Ramakrishna Rao	Indian National Congress
1957	Shahjahan Begum	Indian National Congress
1962	Damodara Reddy	Indian National Congress
1967	K. Naganna	Indian National Congress
1972	N. V. Jagannadham	Indian National Congress
1978	Kistaiah Bheeshva	Indian National Congress
1983	P. Shankar Rao	Indian National Congress
1985	M. Indira	Telugu Desam Party
1989	P. Shankar Rao	Indian National Congress
1994	Bakkani Narasimhulu	Telugu Desam Party
1999	P. Shankar Rao	Indian National Congress
2004	P. Shankar Rao	Indian National Congress
2009	Chowlapally Pratap Reddy	Indian National Congress
2014	Anjaiah Yadav Yelganamoni	Telangana Rashtra Samithi
2018	Anjaiah Yadav Yelganamoni	Telangana Rashtra Samithi
2023	K. Shankaraiah	Indian National Congress

== Election results ==
=== 2023 ===
2023 Telangana Legislative Assembly election: Shadnagar
Party	Candidate	Votes	%	±%
INC	K. Shankaraiah	77,817	39.79	
BRS	Anjaiah Yelganamoni	70,689	36.15	
AIFB	Palamur Vishnuvardhan Reddy	31,651	16.19	
BJP	Ande Babaiah	8,164	4.17	
NOTA	None of the Above	1,389	0.71	
Majority		7,128	3.64	
Turnout		1,95,555		
INC gain from BRS		Swing		

=== 2018 ===
2018 Telangana Legislative Assembly election: Shadnagar
Party	Candidate	Votes	%	±%
TRS	Anjaiah Yelganamoni	72,315	43.43	
INC	Chowlapally Pratap Reddy	51,890	31.16	
BSP	K Shankaraiah	27,814	16.70	
BJP	Nelli Sreevardan Reddy	5,162	3.10	
NOTA	None of the Above	1,909	1.15	
Majority		20,425		
Turnout		1,66,527	88.07	
TRS hold		Swing		

=== Telangana Legislative Assembly election, 2014 ===
Telangana Assembly Elections, 2014: Shadnagar
Party	Candidate	Votes	%	±%
TRS	Anjaiah Yadav Yelganamoni	70,315	45.37	
INC	Chowlapally Pratap Reddy	52,987	34.19	
BJP	Nelli Sreevardan Reddy	20,425	13.18	
Majority		17,328		
Turnout		1,54,985	81.87	
TRS gain from INC		Swing		

== See also ==
- List of constituencies of Telangana Legislative Assembly
