= Porandla =

Porandla may refer to:

- Porandla, Ranga Reddy district
- Porandla, Jagtial district
