= Pendyal, Ranga Reddy district =

Coordinates: 17°08′N 78°22′E

Pendyal
- Village
- Interactive map of Pendyal
- Country: India
- State: Telangana State
- District: Ranga Reddy
- Metro: Rangareddy district

Government
  - Body: Mandal Office

Languages
  - Official: Telugu
- Time zone: UTC+5:30 (IST)
- Planning agency: Panchayat
- Civic agency: Mandal Office

Pendyal is a village and panchayat in Ranga Reddy district, Telangana State, India. It falls under Maheswaram mandal.
