= Muneerabad =

Muneerabad Saalegudem
- Village
- Country: India
- State: Andhra Pradesh
- District: Ranga Reddy
- Metro: Rangareddy district
- Population: 414 (2011)

Government
  - Body: Mandal Office

Languages
  - Official: Telugu
- Time zone: UTC+5:30 (IST)
- Lok Sabha constituency: Malkajigiri
- Vidhan Sabha constituency: Medchal
- Planning agency: Panchayat
- Civic agency: Mandal Office

Muneerabad is a village and panchayat in Ranga Reddy district, Andhra Pradesh, India. It comes under Medchal mandal.
