= Akhanpally =

Akhanpally Akan Pally
- Village
- Country: India
- State: Telangana
- District: Ranga Reddy

Government
  - Body: Mandal Office

Languages
  - Official: Telugu
- Time zone: UTC+5:30 (IST)
- Planning agency: Panchayat
- Civic agency: Mandal Office

Akhanpally is a village and panchayat in Rangareddy district, Telangana, India. It falls under Maheswaram mandal. The village name derived from great Akkanna who is a prominent figure in Golconda Dynasty. This village surrounded by forest and pleasant natural green landscapes. This village has ancient Lord Shiva Temple and Veeranjaneya Temple built during the regime of Golconda kings. It is well connected with Hyderabad city with state-run RTC buses. The major source of income of villagers comes from Agriculture. Although this village very near to Hyderabad city, still there is not even a small industry apart from few poultry farms in the village. Students go to nearby town to pursue higher education.

TRS and Congress are major political parties in the village. This Village is part of Maheshwaram Assembly Constituency and Chevella Loksaba constituency.

K. Chetru Naik, B. Balamma, P. Yadaiah, A. Venkat Reddy, M. Yadaiah have served as Sarpanch of this village.
