= Rayalapur =

- Village
- Country: India
- State: Telangana
- District: Medak
- Metro: Medakdistrict

Government
  - Body: Mandal Office

Languages
  - Official: Telugu
- Time zone: UTC+5:30 (IST)
- Vehicle registration: TS
- Lok Sabha constituency: Medak
- Vidhan Sabha constituency: Medchal
- Planning agency: Panchayat
- Civic agency: Mandal Office
- Website: telangana.gov.in

Rayalapur is a village and panchayat in Rangareddy district, Telangana, India. It comes under Medchal mandal.
