= Kondurg =

- Mandal
- Location in Telangana, India Kondurg (India)
- Coordinates: 17.0992°N 78.0369°E
- Country: India
- State: Telangana
- District: Ranga Reddy district
- Elevation: 639 m (2,096 ft)

Population (2001)
  - Total: 6,176

Languages
  - Official: Telugu
- Time zone: UTC+5:30 (IST)
- Telephone code: 08548
- Vehicle registration: TG-22
- Nearest city: Shadnagar
- Lok Sabha constituency: Mahabubnagar
- Vidhan Sabha constituency: Shadnagar
- Climate: hot (Köppen)
- Website: telangana.gov.in

Kondurg is a Mandal in Ranga Reddy district, Telangana.

== Geography ==
Kondurg is located at 17.0992°N 78.0369°E. It has an average elevation of 639 metres (2099 ft).

== Demographics ==
According to Indian census, 2001, the demographic details of Kondurg mandal is as follows:

- Total Population: 54,899 in 10,739 Households.
- Male Population: 27,793 and Female Population: 27,106
- Children Under 6-years of age: 8,888 (Boys - 4,578 and Girls - 4,310)
- Total Literates: 19,261

Kondurg village has a population of 1,925 (East) and 4,251 (West) in 2001.

== Panchayats ==
There are 28 Gram panchayats in the Mandal.

- Agiryal
- Chegireddi Ghanapuram
- Cherukupalle
- Chinna Elikicherla
- Edira
- Galigudem
- Gunjalpad
- Gurrampalle
- Indranagar
- Jakaram
- Jilled
- Kondurg(West)
- Mahadevpoor
- Mutpoor
- Padmaram
- Parvathpur
- Pedda Elikicherla
- Raviryal
- Regadi Chilakamarri
- Srirangapur
- Tangellapalle
- Tekulapalle
- Thoompalle
- Tummalapalle
- Ummethyal Lalapet
- Uttraspally
- Veerannapet
- Venkiryal
- Viswanathpur
