= Jilled =

Jilled Chowderguda
- Gram panchayat
- Nickname: gudem
- Interactive map of Jilled
- Country: India
- State: Telangana
- District: Ranga Reddy

Languages
  - Official: Telugu
- Time zone: UTC+5:30 (IST)
- Vehicle registration: TS-22
- Lok Sabha constituency: Mahabubnagar
- Vidhan Sabha constituency: Shadnagar
- Website: telangana.gov.in

Jilled is under Chowdarguda Gram panchayat in Kondurg mandal of Ranga Reddy district, Telangana, India and it is hamlet with Chowdarguda.
