= Somaram =

- village
- Country: India
- State: Telangana
- District: Ranga Reddy

Government
  - Body: Mandal Office

Population (2011)
  - Total: 790

Languages,URDU
  - Official: Telugu
- Time zone: UTC+5:30 (IST)
- Vehicle registration: TS
- Lok Sabha constituency: Medak
- Vidhan Sabha constituency: Medchal
- Planning agency: Panchayat
- Civic agency: Mandal Office
- Website: telangana.gov.in

Somaram is a village and panchayat in Ranga Reddy district, Telangana, India. It comes under Medchal mandal.

As of the year 2011, the village had a population of 790.
