= Ameerpet, Ranga Reddy district =

Ameerpet
- village
- Location in Telangana, India Ameerpet (India)
- Coordinates: 17.434802°N 78.448011°E
- Country: India
- State: Telangana
- District: Ranga Reddy

Government
  - Body: Mandal Office

Languages
  - Official: Telugu
- Time zone: UTC+5:30 (IST)
- Vehicle registration: TS
- Planning agency: Panchayat
- Civic agency: Mandal Office

Ameerpet is a village and panchayat in Ranga Reddy district, Telangana, India. It falls under Maheswaram mandal.
