= Gudem =

Gudem (Telugu: గూడెం) may refer to:

- Chappidolla Gudem, a village of Choutuppal mandal in the Nalgonda district in Telangana
- Gali Gudem, a village and gram panchayat in Kondurg mandal in Mahbubnagar district
- Gudem kotha veedhi, a village and a mandal in Visakhapatnam district in the state of Andhra Pradesh
- Tadepalli Gudem, a town and a municipality in Andhra Pradesh
- Gudem, a small village in Odela Mandal in Karimnagar district
- Gudem, a small village in Mustabad mandal in Rajanna sircilla district
