= Porandla, Ranga Reddy district =

Coordinates: 17°03′41″N 78°22′40″E

Porandla, Ranga Reddy district Porandla
- Village
- Interactive map of Porandla, Ranga Reddy district

Porandla is a village and panchayat in Ranga Reddy district, Telangana, India. It falls under Maheswaram mandal, and now part of HMDA.
