= Veerannapeta =

- village
- Location in Telangana, India Veerannapeta (India)
- Coordinates: 17°03′35″N 77°57′55″E
- Country: India
- State: Telangana
- District: Ranga Reddy

Population (2001)
  - Total: 1,850

Languages
  - Official: Telugu
- Time zone: UTC+5:30 (IST)
- Vehicle registration: TS-22
- Nearest city: Shadnagar
- Website: telangana.gov.in

Veerannapeta is a village and gram panchayat in Kondurg mandal of Ranga Reddy district in Telangana, India.

It is located about 7 kilometers from Kondurg and 39 kilometers from Mahbubnagar town.

== Demographics ==
According to Indian census, 2001, the demographic details of this village is as follows:

- Total Population: 1,850 in 355 Households.
- Male Population: 958 and Female Population: 892
- Children Under 6-years of age: 318 (Boys - 168 and Girls - 150)
- Total Literates: 540
