= Dabilpur =

- village
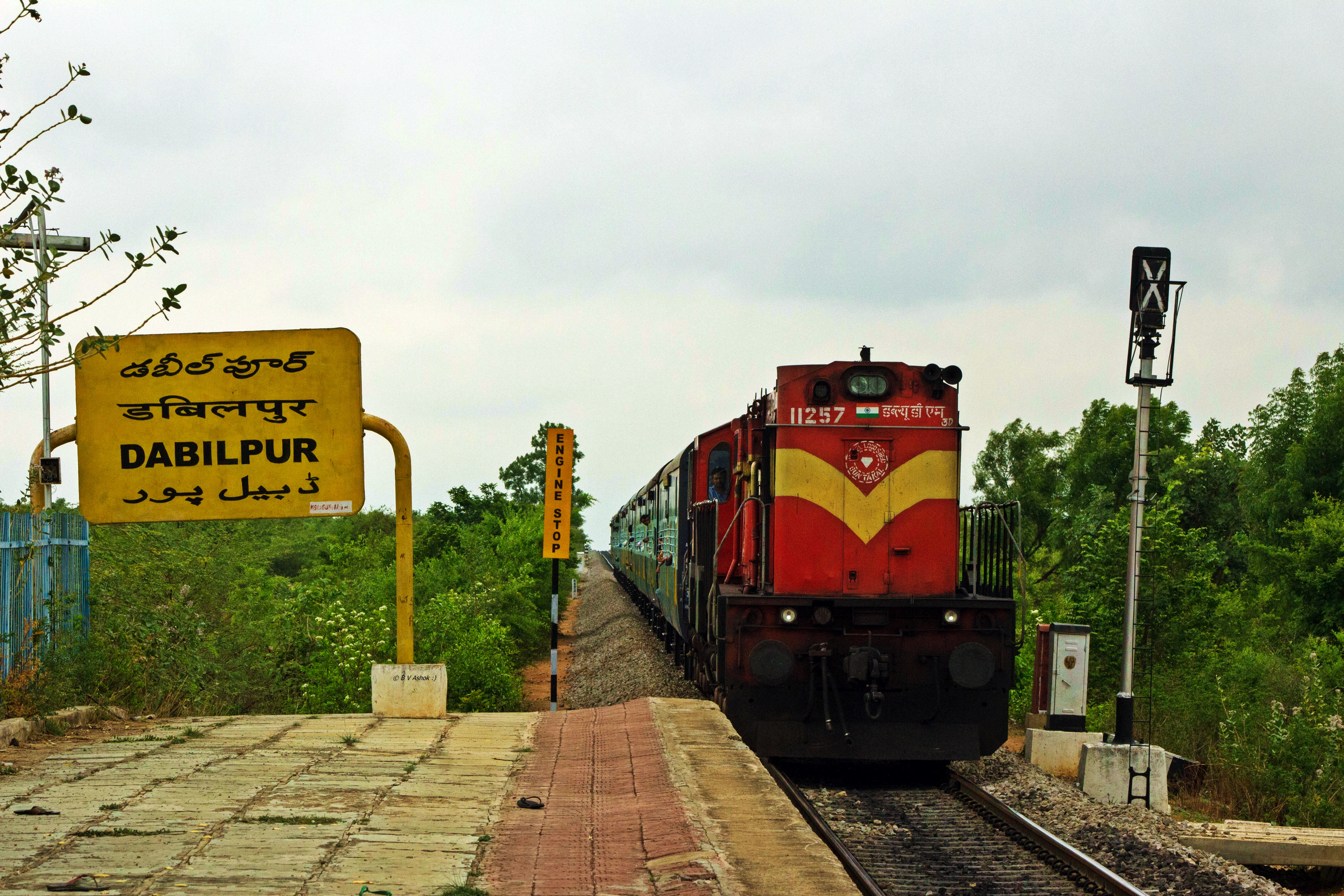
- Dabilpur Railway station
- Country: India
- State: Telangana
- District: Medchal

Languages
  - Official: Telugu
- Time zone: UTC+5:30 (IST)
- Postal code: 501401

Dabilpur is a village in Medchal mandal of Medchal district, Telangana, India.

== Features ==
- It is well connected with Railway station. There are local train services from Secunderabad via. Malkajgiri, Alwal, Bolarum, Medchal to Manoharabad.
- Regular local TSRTC bus services from Secunderabad.
- There is a Krisna Balram temple at Dabilpur maintained by International Society for Krishna Consciousness (ISKCON). Swami Prabhupada stayed here for a year here.
- State Bank of India has a branch in Dabilpur.
- a Village Lingapur is located near to it, which divides by a pond called "Dabilpur cheruvu"
