= Padmaram =

- village
- Interactive map of Padmaram
- Country: India
- State: Telangana
- District: Ranga Reddy

Languages
  - Official: Telugu
- Time zone: UTC+5:30 (IST)
- Vehicle registration: TS 22
- Lok Sabha constituency: shamshabad
- Vidhan Sabha constituency: Shadnagar

Padmaram is a Gram panchayat in Kondurg mandal of Ranga Reddy district, Andhra Pradesh, India.
