= Koheda =

Koheda may refer to:

- Koheda, Rangareddy district, Telangana
- Koheda, Siddipet district, Telangana
