= Nagaram, Shamshabad mandal =

Nagaram
- Village
- Country: India
- State: Andhra Pradesh
- District: Ranga Reddy
- Metro: Rangareddy district

Government
  - Body: Mandal Office

Languages
  - Official: Telugu
- Time zone: UTC+5:30 (IST)
- Planning agency: Panchayat
- Civic agency: Mandal Office

Nagaram is a village and panchayat in Ranga Reddy district, AP, India. It falls under the Maheswaram mandal. It is about 7 km from Shamshabad International Airport. It takes approximately five minutes on the ORR to reach Nagaram exit point from the Airport. It has the advantage of close proximity to the Airport, as well as Nagaram Village and Maheshwaram Mandal (ITIR region). A few connecting roads to Manasapally 'X' roads and Nagaram village are coming up fast and will pave the way for further growth.
