= Pedda Elikicherla =

- Gram panchayat
- Interactive map of Pedda Elikicherla
- Country: India
- State: Telangana
- District: Ranga Reddy district

Population (2001)
  - Total: 4,246

Languages
  - Official: Telugu, Urdu, English
- Time zone: UTC+5:30 (IST)
- PIN: 509207
- Telephone code: 91-08548
- Vehicle registration: Ts07
- Climate: hot (Köppen)

Pedda Elikicherla is a village and Gram panchayat in Chowderguda mandal of Ranga Reddy district, Telangana, India.

== Demographics ==
According to Indian census, 2001, the demographic details of Pedda Yelkicherla is as follows:

- Total Population: 4,246 in 761 Households.
- Male Population: 2,110 and Female Population: 2,136
- Children Under 6-years of age: 837 (Boys - 425 and Girls - 412)
- Total Literates: 1,273
