= Ravalkole =

- Village
- Location in Telangana, India Ravalkole (India)
- Coordinates: 17°39′30″N 78°31′30″E
- Country: India
- State: Telangana
- District: Medchal-Malkajgiri

Government
  - Body: Mandal Office

Languages
  - Official: Telugu
- Time zone: UTC+5:30 (IST)
- Postal code: 501401
- Vehicle registration: TG
- Website: telangana.gov.in

Ravalkole is a village in Medchal mandal, located in the Medchal-Malkajgiri district of Telangana, India.
