= Ghatpalle =

Ghatpalle Gattupally
- Village
- Gattupally
- Country: India
- State: Telangana
- District: Vikarabad
- Metro: Vikarabad district

Government
  - Body: Mandal Office

Languages
  - Official: Telugu
- Time zone: UTC+5:30 (IST)
- Postal code: 501501
- Planning agency: Panchayat
- Civic agency: Mandal Office

Ghatpalle is a village and panchayat in Vikarabad district, TS, India. It falls under Pudur mandal.
