= Hajipalle =

- Model village
- Country: India
- State: Telangana
- District: Ranga Reddy
- Mandal: Farooqnagar

Population
  - Total: 772
- Website: http://www.hajipalle.in

Hajipalle is a model village located in Farooqnagar mandal, Ranga Reddy district of Telangana, India. It is one of 36 villages in Farooqnagar Block. Before becoming a Gram Panchayat, Hajipalle was hamlet of the village Kishan nagar.

== Demographics ==
The village has a total population of 772 members of which there are 383 male and 389 female individuals accounting 177 households according to 2011 census. The total geographical area of village is 750acres consisting of eight wards.

== Location ==
The village is located 2.7 km to the west of national highway7 (Bangalore-Hyderabad highway) and is easily accessible by road from Farooqnagar. The nearest railway station to the village is Shadnagar which is located 8.3 km away.

The Official Website for Hajipalle Village is http://hajipalle.in

== Economy ==
Agriculture is the major occupation of people living in Hajipalle and 30% of villagers do cattle farming. Some of the crops grown in this region include Paddy, jowar, ragi, vegetables, pulse, millets, groundnut, castor, sugarcane, mango, lime, guava, sapota, papaya, sweet orange etc.

== Model village ==
The village is awarded with 'Nirmal Gram Puraskar' (from former president Pratibha Patil) given by Ministry of Drinking Water and Sanitation (MoDWS), Government of India in the year 2008 for developing the village as fully sanitized and open defecation free Gram Panchayat with their collective leadership and shared vision. The village was also awarded with 'Shubhram' award by former chief minister Y.S.Rajashekar Reddy. The village is also felicitated by NIRD (National Institute of Rural Development). Many government officials from the country and outside India have also visited this model village. The village is now an aadarsh Gram Panchayat to many other villages in the country.
