= M. Indira =

Indian politician

M. Indira served as the Member of the Legislative Assembly for Shadnagar constituency in Andhra Pradesh, India, between 1985 and 1989. They represented the Telugu Desam Party.
