= Chowlapally Pratap Reddy =

Indian politician

Chowlapally Pratap Reddy was elected as the Member of the Legislative Assembly for Shadnagar constituency in Andhra Pradesh, India, in 2009. He represented the Indian National Congress. After losing the 2014 and 2018 Assembly Elections, he quit the Indian National Congress and joined Telangana Rastra Samithi.
