= Girmapur =

Coordinates: 17°47′N 78°35′E

- Village
- Interactive map of Girmapur
- Country: India
- State: Telangana
- District: Medchal-Malkajgiri district
- Metro: Hyderabad

Government
  - Body: Mandal Office

Languages
  - Official: Telugu
- Time zone: UTC+5:30 (IST)
- Vehicle registration: TS
- Lok Sabha constituency: Malkajgiri
- Vidhan Sabha constituency: Medchal
- Planning agency: Medchal Municipal 9th Ward
- Civic agency: Mandal Office

Girmapur comes under Medchal Municipal 9th Ward under Malkajgiri Municipal Corporation in Medchal-Malkajgiri district, Telangana, India. It comes under Medchal mandal of Keesara Revenue Division.

The village is famous for Stone Crushing Industries.

There's a historic temple in the village outskirts, Mallana Gudi. An annual celebration of this deity is celebrated every year, called Mallana Jathara.
