= Yelganamoni Anjaiah Yadav =

Indian politician

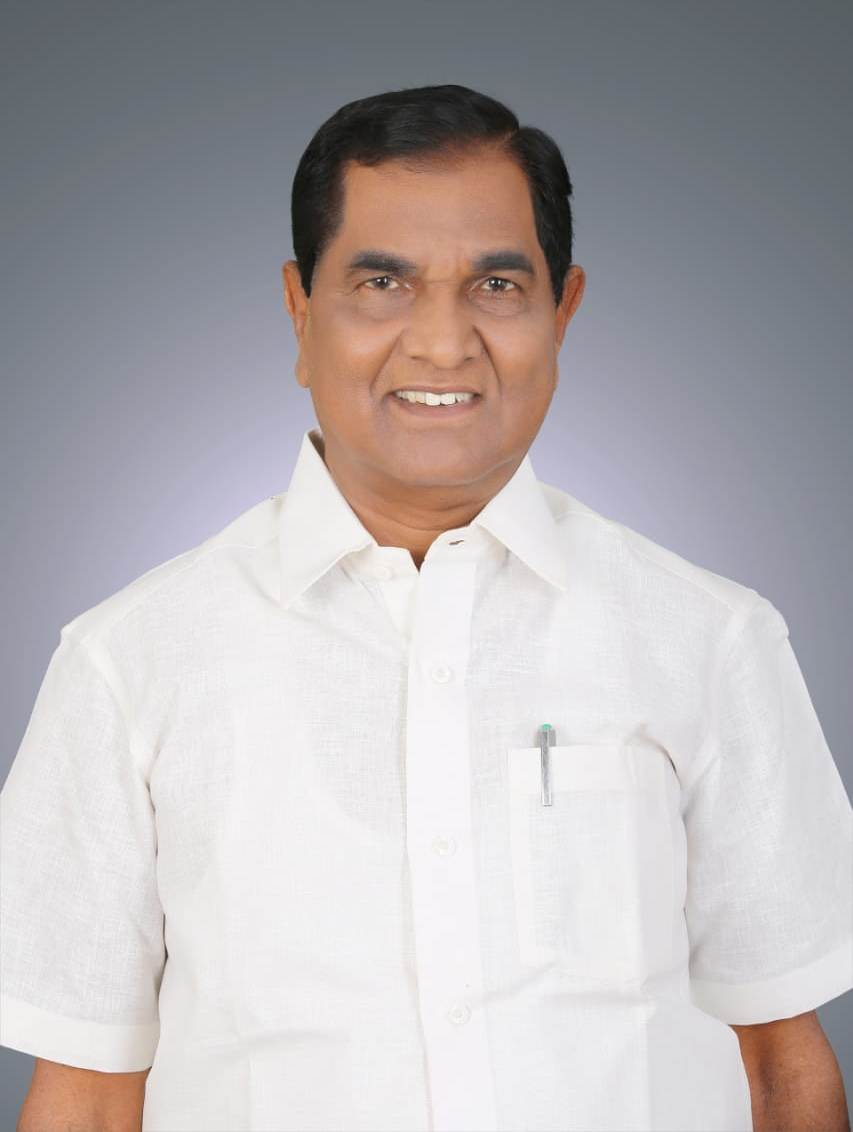

Member of Telangana Legislative Assembly
- In office 2014–2023
- Succeeded by: K. Shankaraiah
- Constituency: Shadnagar

Personal details
- Born: Anjaiah Yadav Yelganamoni
- Party: BRS
- Occupation: Politician

Yelganamoni Anjaiah Yadav is a Member of the Telangana Legislative Assembly representing Shadnagar constituency. He belongs to the Telangana Rashtra Samithi party.
