= Chowdarguda mandal =

Chowdarguda Chowderguda
- Mandal
- Nickname: gudem
- Interactive map of Chowdarguda
- Country: India
- State: Telangana
- District: Ranga Reddy district

Languages
  - Official: Telugu
- Time zone: UTC+5:30 (IST)
- Vehicle registration: TS-07
- Lok Sabha constituency: Mahabubnagar
- Vidhan Sabha constituency: Shadnagar

Chowdarguda is a mandal of Ranga Reddy district, Telangana, India.
