= Injapur =

Coordinates: 19°43′N 79°07′E

- Town
- Interactive map of Injapur
- Country: India
- State: Telangana

Languages
  - Official: Telugu
- Time zone: UTC+5:30 (IST)
- Telephone code: 040
- Vehicle registration: TS-08 X XXXX

Injapur is an urban village in Rangareddy district in Telangana, India. It falls under Abdullapurmet mandal and administration under Turkayamjal Municipality. It is 9 km within the Outer Ring Road, Hyderabad.It is located just adjuscent to LB Nagar constituency.Located centre connecting in between Sagar Highway, Vijayawada high way @Hayathnagar. Injapur village surrounded its south with vast greenary forest and Masabh Cheruvu. Govt of Telangana finalised to merge this village into GHMC Hyderabad.
