= Chegireddy Ghanpur =

- village
- Interactive map of Chegireddy Ghanpur
- Country: India
- State: Telangana
- District: Ranga Reddy

Population (2001)
  - Total: 1,253

Languages
  - Official: Telugu
- Time zone: UTC+5:30 (IST)
- Vehicle registration: AP22
- Lok Sabha constituency: Ranga Reddy
- Vidhan Sabha constituency: Shadnagar

Chegireddi Ghanapuram or Chegireddy Ghanpur is a village and Gram panchayat in Jilled Chowdergudem mandal of Ranga Reddy district, Telangana, India.

== Demographics ==
According to Indian census, 2001, the demographic details of Chegireddy Ghanpur village is as follows:

- Total Population: 1,253 in 245 Households
- Male Population: 629 and Female Population: 624
- Children Under 6-years of age: 255 (Boys - 140 and Girls - 115)
- Total Literates: 316
