= Eliminedu =

- Village
- Country: India
- State: Telangana
- District: Ranga Reddy
- Metro: Rangareddy district

Government
  - Body: Mandal Office

Languages
  - Official: Telugu
- Time zone: UTC+5:30 (IST)
- PIN: 501506
- Vehicle registration: TS
- Lok Sabha constituency: Nalgonda
- Vidhan Sabha constituency: Ibrahimpatnam
- Planning agency: Panchayat
- Civic agency: Mandal Office
- Website: telangana.gov.in

Eliminedu is a village and panchayat in Ranga Reddy district, Telangana, India. It comes under Ibrahimpatnam mandal.

It is 25 kilometers away from Hyderabad city. The Outer Ring Road, Hyderabad is 13 kilometers from the village. Rajiv Gandhi International Airport is 40 kilometers away.
