= Chakrampally =

Chakrampally (Chakralapally)
- village
- Interactive map of Chakrampally
- Coordinates: 17.4952°N 77.9911°E
- Country: India
- State: Telangana
- District: Ranga Reddy
- Metro: Ranga Reddy district

Government
  - Body: Mominpet Mandal Office

Languages
  - Official: Telugu
- Time zone: UTC+5:30 (IST)
- Planning agency: Panchayat
- Civic agency: Mominpet Mandal Office

Chakrampally, also written Chakrampalle, is a village located in Ranga Reddy district of Telangana, India. It falls under Mominpet mandal. It is 40 km (25 mi) from its headquarters, the capital of Telangana, Hyderabad.

== Geography ==
Chakrampally is located in the border of the Rangareddy District and Medak District at the north. Around Chakrampally, there are Nawabpet Mandal on the south, Sadasivpet Mandal on the north, Marpally Mandal on the west, and Kondapur Mandal on the east. Cities near Chakrampally are: Sadasivpet, Vikarabad, and Sangareddy. Among them, the nearest village is Vikarabad, about 38 km from Chakrampally.

The latitude of the village is 17.5 and longitude is 78.0, where the time zone is UTC+05:30, sun rise time is 16 minutes different from (Indian Standard Time).

=== Transportation ===
==== Road ====
Chakrampally people have to drive their vehicles left on road, while their driving side is on left, too. A road between Chakrampally and Vikarabad is available.

==== Rail ====
A nearby village to Chakrampally is Vikarabad, where train stations are well developed, such as Vikarabad Jn Railway Station and Godamgura Railway Station. Sadasivpet is a nearby town where the railway Station is available (Eedula).Hyderabad Decan Railway Station is the closest, major railway station, about 69 km (43 mi) away.

== Climate ==
The climate of Chakrampally is tropical, large amount of precipitation during the summer while small amount of it during the winter. The average of temperature is 26.3 °C and precipitation is 930 mm. The precipitation difference between July, average of 225 mm as the wettest month, and January, average of 1 mm as the driest month, is 224 mm. Also, the temperature difference between May, average of 32.6 °C as the warmest month, and December, average of 21.5 °C, is 11.1 °C.

Chakrampally has two main seasons, one is the rainy season, which is during June to September or October. This is called kharif, which takes about 30% of the whole year's precipitation. Another is the drought season, which is during October to December, which is called rabi. The amount of precipitation always varies within years. The ratio of precipitation to drought of first three decades was 11 to 16. However, during 1910 to 1930, the ratio was firmly balanced, 10 to 10. After 30 years, the ratio changed entirely, 15 to 10 (Dietz, Put, and Subbiah).

== Demographics ==
Chakrampally has total 942 people in 456 hectares of region, where males are 462 and females are 480 with 199 houses (Eedula).

=== Language ===
Villages in Renga Reddy speak Telugu, Urdu, and English for communication (Eedula).

=== Education ===
There are two co-educational institutions: Govt Jr College Mominpet, the only colleague nearby the village; Mpups Chakrampally, a school with primary and upper primary students (Eedula). Rural Knowledge Center at Chakrampally, Mominpet in Ranga Reddy District was initiated on 2 October 2007, supported by Cause and Effect Foundation.
