= Kongara Kalan =

- Village, District Headquarters
- Country: India
- State: Telangana

Population (2011)
  - Total: 5,269

Languages
  - Official: Telugu
- Time zone: UTC5:30 (IST)
- Area code: 08414
- Vehicle registration: TS 08
- Website: telangana.gov.in

Kongara Kalan is a village in Ranga Reddy district in Telangana, India. It falls under Ibrahimpatnam mandal. It has population of 5,269 as per the 2011 Census of India.

== Economy ==
In 2023, Foxconn, in partnership with the Government of Telangana, broke ground on a manufacturing facility in the town. The facility is estimated to support up to 25,000 jobs in the first phase. The initial investment on the plant from Foxconn is $500M.
