= Ponnal =

- Village
- Location in Telangana, India Ponnal (India)
- Coordinates: 17°35′N 78°34′E
- Country: India
- State: Telangana

Languages
  - Official: Telugu
- Time zone: UTC+5:30 (IST)
- PIN: 500078
- Telephone code: 08418
- Vehicle registration: AP 28 X XXXX
- Sex ratio: 1:1(approx) ♂/♀
- Website: www.tgstate.blogspot.com

Ponnal is a village in Rangareddy district in the Telangana state of India. It falls under Shamirpet mandal. This village is 23 km away from Secunderabad. It is 2 km away from Outer Ring Road. The village is located 6 km away from Shamirpet.
