= Kawadipally =

- Village
- Location in Telangana, India Kawadipally (India)
- Coordinates: 17°20′04″N 78°41′50″E
- Country: India
- State: Telangana

Languages
  - Official: Telugu
- Time zone: UTC+5:30 (IST)
- Postal code: 501513
- Telephone code: 040
- Vehicle registration: TS/TG-07
- Website: telangana.gov.in

Kawadipally/కవాడిపల్లి is a village in Ranga Reddy district in Telangana, India. It falls under Abdullapurmet mandal where Telugu is the state language.

Kawadipally is a village in Abdullapurmet Mandal, Rangareddy District, Telangana State. Kawadipally is 13 km distance from Main Town Hayathnagar. Kawadipally is 63.6 km distance from its District Main City Rangareddy. And 23 km distance from its State Main City Hyderabad. The village is famous for 400 years old SRI SRI SRI KODANDA RAMACHANDRASWAMY(శ్రీ శ్రీ శ్రీ కోదండ రామచంద్రస్వామి) Temple. The temple also includes few upalayas like Vinayaka Temple, Hanuman Temple, Srimannarayana sametha Ashtalakshmi Temple, Subramanya swamy Temple and Navagrahas. Every year during Sri Rama Navami - Kalyanotsavam, Rathothsavam and Chakratheertham are performed by the archakas.

Devotees from distant places visit and take blessings of the Lord Sri Seetha Ramachandra Swamy.

Apart from the temple other main attraction is Antharganga Waterfalls during monsoon season.

Origin/History of Village Name: The village's name in Telugu, కవాడిపల్లి (Kavadipally), has an interesting history rooted in its military past. The original Telugu description, "సైనికుల కవాతు శిక్షణ జరిగిన స్థలము. కవాతు పదాతిదళ విన్యాసములు జరుగుచోటు," translates to "a place where soldiers underwent parade training and infantry drills took place." It's believed that the army would approach the main city with caution, giving advance warning from a distance. Because of this strategic military presence, the place was initially called కవాతిపల్లి (Kavathipally), signifying "a place associated with the army." Over time, the name gradually transformed into its current form, కవాడిపల్లి (Kavadipally).

Reference from Telugu book రంగారెడ్డి జిల్లా గ్రామనామాలు సమగ్ర పరిశీలన by డాక్టర్ మొరంగపల్లి శ్రీకాంత్ కుమార్:

సైనికుల కవాతు శిక్షణ జరిగిన స్థలము. కవాతు పదాతిదళ విన్యాసములు జరుగుచోటు. మహానగరానికి సైన్యము కొంతదూరము నుండియే హెచ్చరిక చేస్తూ రావాలి, కావున జాగ్రత్తతో సైన్యము చేరేదని ప్రతీతి. సైన్యముతో కూడిన స్థలము కావున దీనికి కవాతిపల్లి అనేది. రానురాను కవాడిపల్లిగా మార్పుచెందినది.
