= Galigudem =

Coordinates: 16°54′N 78°12′E

- village
- Interactive map of Galigudem
- Country: India
- State: Andhra Pradesh
- District: Ranga Reddy

Languages
  - Official: Telugu
- Time zone: UTC+5:30 (IST)
- PIN: 509207
- Vehicle registration: AP22
- Lok Sabha constituency: Mahabubnagar
- Vidhan Sabha constituency: Shadnagar

Galigudem is a village and Gram panchayat in Chouderiguda mandal in Ranga Reddy district.
