= Keshampeta mandal =

Keshampet Kesampeta
- mandal
- Nickname: kesampet
- Country: India
- State: Telangana
- District: RangaReddy

Languages
  - Official: Telugu
- Time zone: UTC+5:30 (IST)
- PIN: 509408
- Vehicle registration: TG 07
- Nearest city: Hyderabad
- Lok Sabha constituency: Mahabubnagar
- Vidhan Sabha constituency: Shadnagar
- Climate: hot (Köppen)

Keshampet is a Mandal in Ranga Reddy district, Telangana, Pincode number 509408.The coordinates of Keshampet is 16.9532° N, 78.3480° E.

== Institutions ==
- Zilla Parishad High School
- Hinduja Degree College

== Villages ==
The villages in Keshampeta mandal include:

- Alwal
- Bhairkhanpally
- Bodanampalle
- Chowlapalle
- Eklaskhampeta
- Ippalapalle
- Kakunoor
- Keshampet
- Kondareddipalle
- Kothapeta
- Lemamidi
- Lingamdana
- Mangalguda
- Nirdavally
- Papireddiguda
- Pomalpalle
- Sangem
- Santhapur
- Sundarapuram
- Thommidirekula
- Vemulanarva
- konayapally
