= Koheda, Ranga Reddy district =

Koheda Fruit Market Town
- village
- Nickname: Fruit Town
- Country: India
- State: Telangana
- District: Ranga Reddy

Languages
  - Official: Telugu
- Time zone: UTC+5:30 (IST)

Koheda is a village and in abdullapurmet mandal in Ranga Reddy district in the state of Telangana in India.
