= Chappidolla Gudem =

- village
- Location in Telangana, India Chappidolla Gudem (India)
- Coordinates: 17.311815°N 78.929565°E
- Country: India
- State: Telangana
- District: Nalgonda

Government
  - Chappidi: Laxma Reddy

Population (2001)
  - Total: 4,375

Languages
  - Official: Telugu
- Time zone: UTC+5:30 (IST)
- PIN: 508252
- Telephone code: 08694
- Vehicle registration: AP 24, TS 05
- Sex ratio: 1.04 ♂/♀
- Website: bhongir.org/Mandals.asp?View=Census

Chappidolla Gudem is a village of Choutuppal mandal in the Nalgonda district in Telangana. It falls under Munugodu assembly and Bhongir parliament constitution.

Concerns: These village's ground water is rapidly polluting by surrounded pharma companies like Prathista Industries Limited and other Pharama Companies.
