= Porandla, Jagtial district =

Coordinates: 18.8357°N 78.90885°E

Porandla
- Village
- Interactive map of Porandla
- Location in Telangana, India
- Country: India
- State: Telangana
- District: Jagtial district

Government
  - Body: Gram panchayat

Languages
  - Official: Telugu
- Time zone: UTC+5:30 (IST)
- Civic agency: Mandal Office

Porandla is a village in Jagtial Rural mandal, Jagtial district, in the Indian state of Telangana.
