= Korremula =

- Village
- Interactive map of Korremula
- Country: India
- State: Telangana

Languages
  - Official: Telugu
  - Spoken Languages: Hindi, English
- Time zone: UTC+5:30 (IST)
- Telephone code: 040
- Vehicle registration: TS 08 X XXXX
- Website: telangana.gov.in

Korremula is a village of Medchal-Malkajigiri district in Telangana, India. It falls under Ghatkesar mandal. Korremula is an upcoming residential and commercial suburban area due its close proximity to Singapore Township and Raheja Mindspace. The Outer Ring Road, Hyderabad is passing through this village, developing like urban area.
