= Chowderguda =

- Village
- Interactive map of Chowderguda
- Country: India
- State: Andhra Pradesh

Languages
  - Official: Telugu
- Time zone: UTC+5:30 (IST)
- Telephone code: 040
- Vehicle registration: TG-07

Chowderguda is a village in Ranga Reddy district of the Indian state of Telangana. It is located in Shamshabad mandal of Rajendranagar revenue division.
