= Medchal =

Medchal Medi chelama
- Town
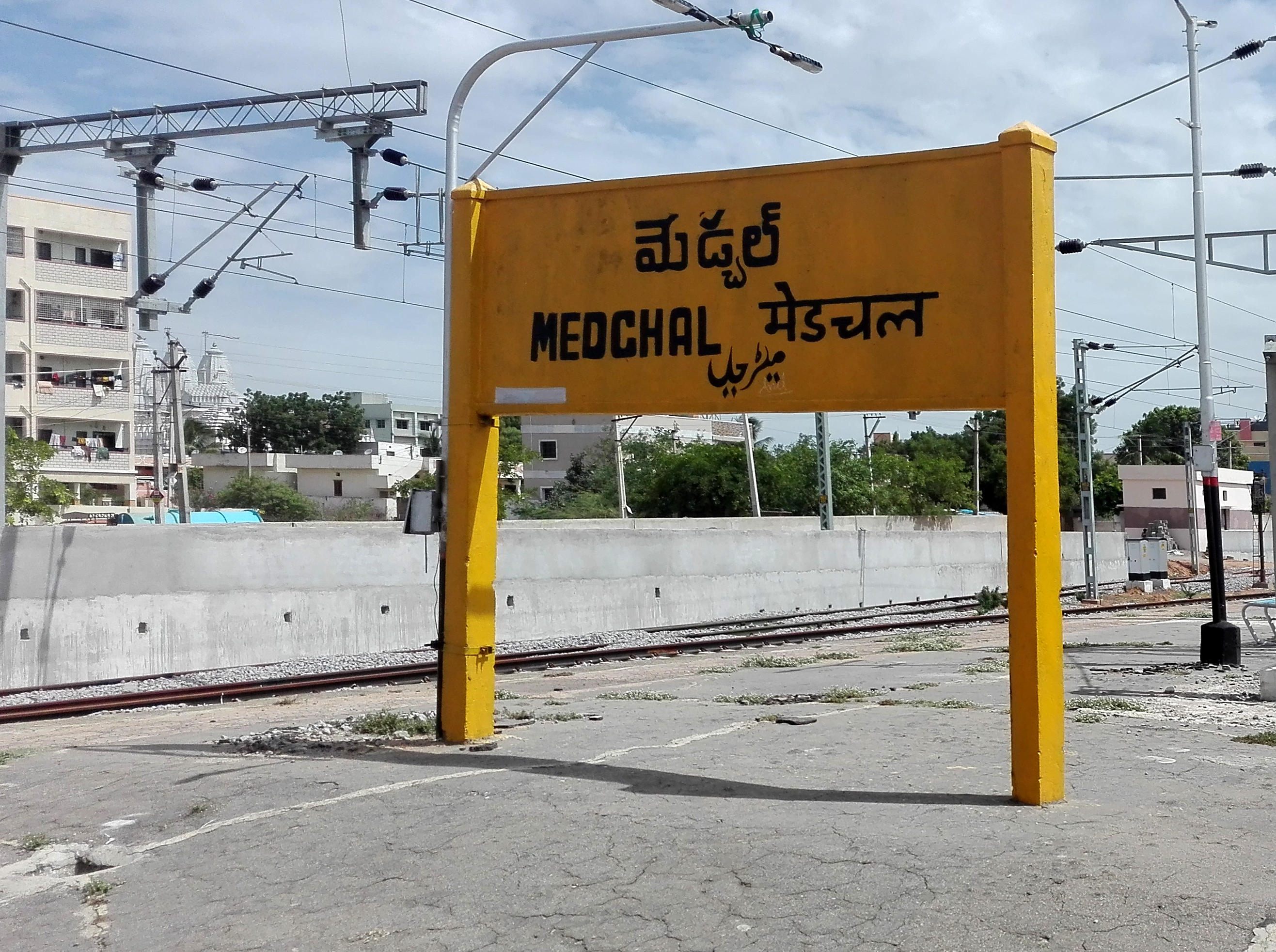
- Medchal Railway station

- Location in Telangana, India Medchal (India)
- Coordinates: 17.6297°N 78.4814°E
- Country: India
- State: Telangana
- District: Medchal–Malkajgiri district
- Metro: Hyderabad Metropolitan Development Authority
- Incorporated (town): 22-03-2013

Government
  - Type: Municipal
  - Body: Medchal Municipality

Area
  - Total: 26.95 km^{2} (10.41 sq mi)

Population (2018)
  - Total: 38,116
  - Density: 1,414/km^{2} (3,663/sq mi)

Languages
  - Official: Telugu
- Time zone: UTC+5:30 (IST)
- PIN Code: 501401
- Vehicle registration: TG-08

Medchal is an outer suburb of Hyderabad in the Medchal–Malkajgiri district of the Indian state of Telangana. It is the mandal headquarters of Medchal mandal in Keesara revenue division of the district. It also forms a part of Hyderabad Metropolitan Development Authority. Chamakura Malla Reddy is the MLA of Medchal Assembly Constituency.

== History ==
The History of Medchal is about 160-180 years. Medchal was named by a rich Baniah Sri Kandukuri Raja Ram who was a resident of Hyderabad state. While travelling on a horse-drawn cartm he stopped at this place because of experiencing some body pains. He took some water from a small pond, drank it and slept under a tree called Medi chettu. When he woke up, his body pains were gone. He decided to stay in that place and named it Medi chelama, which turned into Medchal. Eventually people started living in this area. He had 3 houses constructed which are G+1 storied buildings out of which 2 are dismantled and 1 is available now. This is an industrially developed area. Medchal was previously known as Medichelama (Medi means Fig and Chelama means spring) and was later renamed as Medchal, which means town of glory. Medchal was once a resort for Nizams, who constructed a beautiful mansion here. The Jain temple of Vardhaman Mahavir, which is India's third most famous temple for Jains, is located in Medchal. There are many dhabas, grape gardens, and beautiful villas on the Medchal highway.

Medchal Municipality constituted vide G.O.Ms.No.106 MA & UD (Elec-I) Dept. dated 22-03-2013 duly merging two Gram Panchayats viz., Medchal and Athvelly. The Nagar Panchayat administration is functioning w.e.f. 16.09.2013. The area of the Nagar Panchayat is 26.95 Sq. Kms. Medchal town is located at 17.6297 N 78.4814 E. It has an average elevation of 577 meters (1896 feet).

== Geography ==
Medchal is located at 17.6297°N 78.4814°E.

== Government and politics ==
The Medchal municipality is the local self government of the town.

== Public transport ==
There is a railway station in Medchal under South Central Railway, Indian Railways. Medchal also has a bus station, which is the second richest in Telangana in terms of revenue, according to 2016 report.

== Important Places ==
ISKCON runs a temple of Krishna and his older brother Balarama in the Dabilpur village, near Medchal which is visited annually by thousands of devotees.

The campus also has a Goshala with 150 cows along with a practice of organic farming.

There is a newly built Jain Temple near Medchal Railway Station. It is called 72 Jinalaya. Lord Tribhuvan Parswanth is Presiding Deity along. A Dadawadi is also built. The temple have residential and food facility for Jain Pilgrims. It is gaining popularity among the jain pilgrims from across the country.

== Notable people ==
- Sandeep Reddy - Telangana state first MBC Corporation chairman
