= Maheswaram =

- Village
- Interactive map of Maheswaram
- Coordinates: 17.933029°N 79.862234°E
- Country: India
- State: Telangana
- District: NARSAMPET DIVISION
- Talukas: Maheswaram

Languages
  - Official: Telugu
- Time zone: UTC+5:30 (IST)

Maheswaram Maheshwaram is a Village in Narsampet Mandal in Warangal District of Telangana State, India. It belongs to Telangana region. As part Telangana Districts re-organisation, Maheshwaram Village Narsampet Mandal re organised from Warangal District to Warangal Rural district and later to Ranga Reddy district. It is located 35 KM towards East from District head quarters Warangal. 4 KM from Narsampet.

Maheshwaram Pin code is 506331 and postal head office is Togarrai .
