= Ranga Reddy district =

- District of Telangana
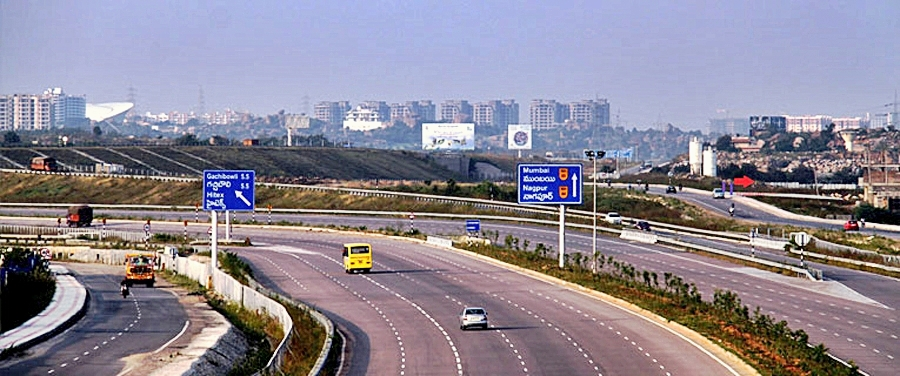
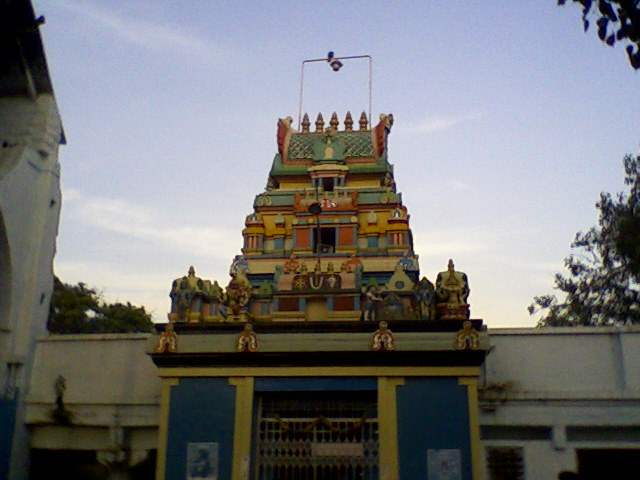
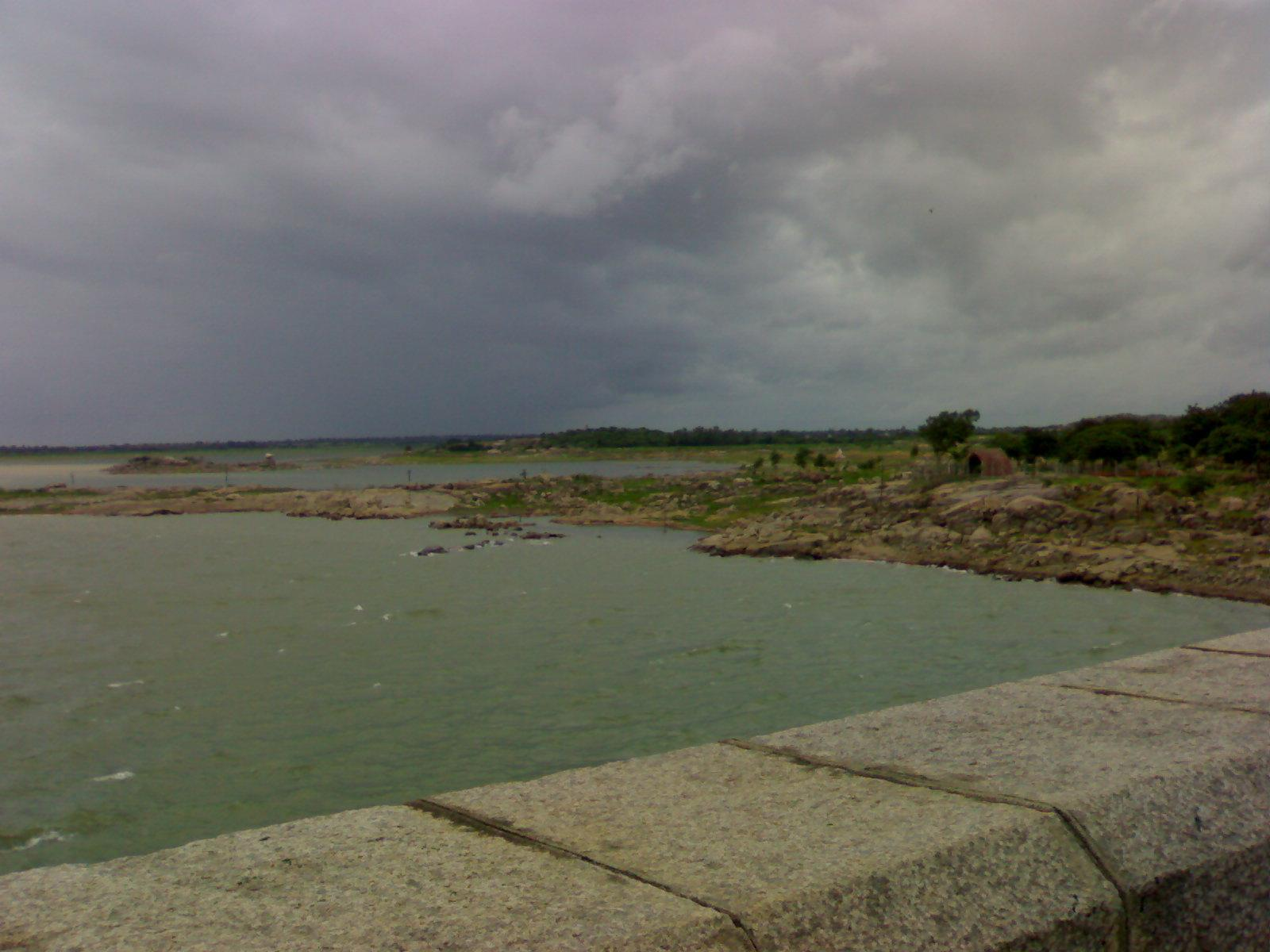
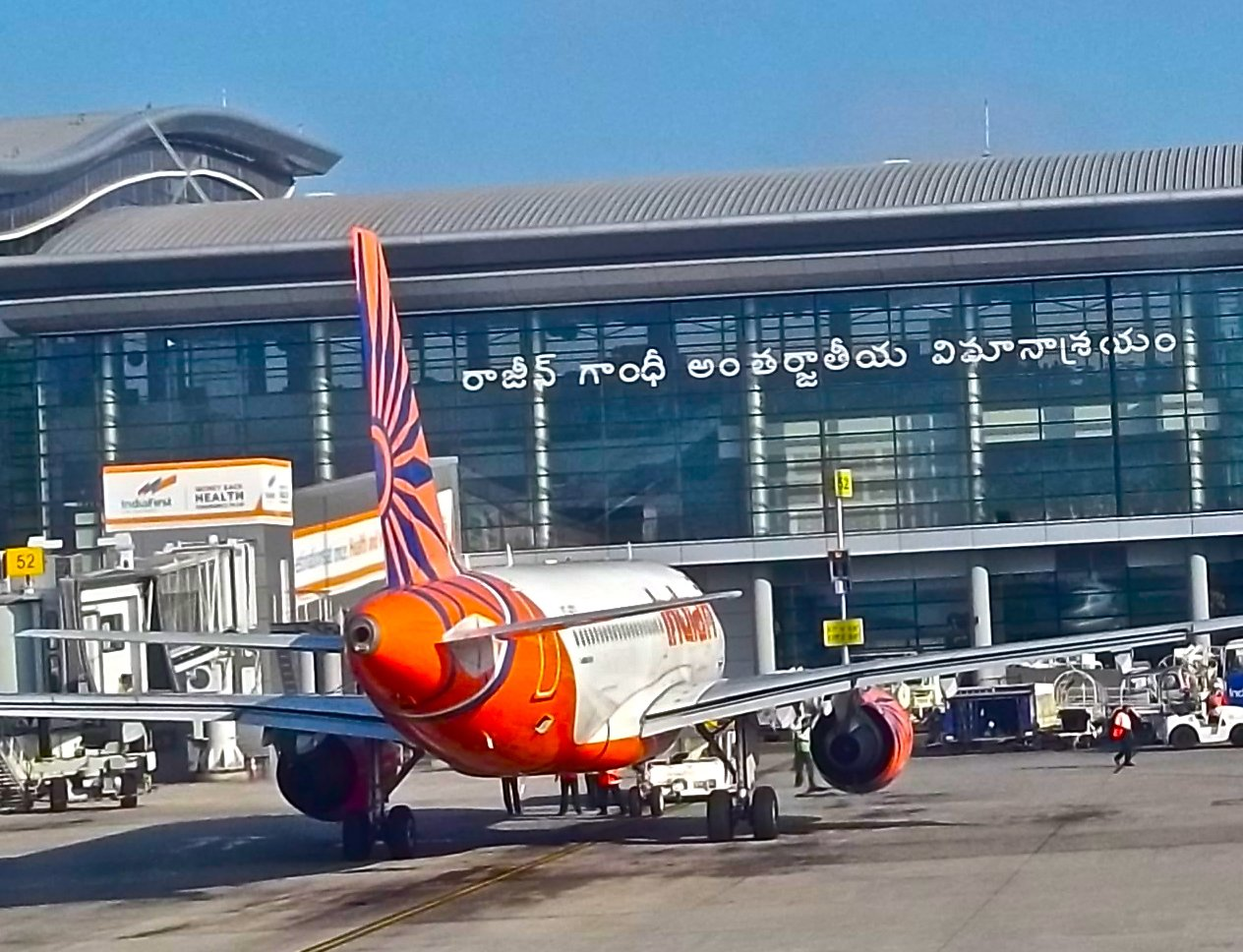
- Clockwise from top: Outer Ring Road, Chilkoor Balaji Temple, Rajiv Gandhi International Airport, View of Osman Sagar, Residential buildings at Miyapur
- Nickname: RR District
- Location in Telangana
- Ranga Reddy district
- Coordinates: 17.3°N 78.1°E
- Country: India
- State: Telangana
- Headquarters: Kongara Kalan Village, Ibrahimpatnam Mandal
- Mandals: 27
- Revenue Divisions: 5
- Established: 15 August 1978
- Reorganisation: 11 October 2016
- Founder: Government of Telangana
- Named for: K. V. Ranga Reddy

Government
  - Type: Zilla Parishad (Zilla Panchayat) or District Administration
  - Body: Ranga Reddy Zilla Parishad (Panchayat)
  - District Election Commissioner and District Collector: Sri. C. Narayana Reddy I.A.S

Area
  - District of Telangana: 5,031 km^{2} (1,942 sq mi)

Population (2011)
  - District of Telangana: 2,446,265
  - Rank: 2nd
  - Density: 486/km^{2} (1,260/sq mi)
  - Urban: 1,420,152
  - Rural: 1,026,113

Languages
  - Official: Telugu
- Time zone: UTC+5:30 (IST)
- PIN: 500 0XX, 501 5XX, 501 2XX, 501 1XX, 509 3XX
- Telephone code: 91-, 040, 08413, 08414, 08417
- Vehicle registration: TG–07
- Nominal GDP (2022-23): ₹283,419.12 crore (US$36.06 billion)
- Per Capita Income (2022-23): ₹946,862 (US$12,045.9)
- Website: rangareddy.telangana.gov.in

Ranga Reddy district is a district in the Indian state of Telangana. The district headquarters is located at Kongara Kalan Village, Ibrahimpatnam Mandal. The district was named after the former deputy chief minister of the United Andhra Pradesh, K. V. Ranga Reddy. The district shares boundaries with Nalgonda, Yadadri, Hyderabad, Medchal–Malkajgiri, Nagarkurnool, Mahabubnagar, Sangareddy and Vikarabad districts.

== History ==
=== Dynasties ===
Chronological order of kingdoms who ruled Rangareddy and Hyderabad regions is as follows:

1. Nandas
2. Mauryas
3. Satavahanas
4. Ikshvakus
5. Vakatakas
6. Vishnukundinas
7. Badami Chalukyas
8. Rashtrakutas
9. Kalyani Chalukyas
10. Kakatiyas
11. Delhi Sultanate (Khilji & Tughlaq dynasties)
12. Musunuri Nayakas
13. Recherla Padmanayakas (Rachakonda & Devarakonda Velamas)
14. Bahamanis
15. Qutub Shahis
16. Mughals
17. Asaf Jahis

=== Formation of district ===
The district was formed in 1978 when it was split from Hyderabad district. Originally named Hyderabad Rural district, it was renamed after Konda Venkata Ranga Reddy, a freedom fighter who fought for the independence of Telangana from the Nizams, and who went on to become the deputy chief minister of Andhra Pradesh. In 2016, it was carved out during the district's reorganisation to create the new Vikarabad district and Medchal–Malkajgiri district.

== Geography ==
Ranga Reddy District occupies an area of approximately 5,031 square kilometres (1,942 sq mi).

A freshwater reservoir, called Osman Sagar, Himayath Sagar, on the river Musi at Gandipet, is the prime drinking water source for the capital city of Hyderabad/Secunderabad.

== Demographics ==
Religion in Rangareddy district (2011)
Hinduism	84.34%
Islam	12.67%
Christianity	1.86%
Other or not stated	1.13%

According to the 2011 census, Ranga Reddy District has a population of 2,446,265, of which 1,254,184 were males and 1,192,081 were females. The Sex Ratio (Females per 1000 Males) was 950. The rural population in the district was 1,026,113 (41.95%) while the urban population was 1420152 (58.05%). The literacy rate was calculated to be 71.95%, higher than the state's literacy rate of 66.54%. 300,511 (12.28%) were under 6 years of age. Scheduled Castes and Scheduled Tribes made up 337,023 (13.78%) and 138,710 (5.67%) of the population respectively.

Languages of Rangareddy district (2011)
1. Telugu (77.5%)
2. Urdu (11.9%)
3. Lambadi (4.76%)
4. Hindi (2.72%)
5. Others (3.19%)

At the time of the 2011 census, 77.47% of the population spoke Telugu, 11.86% Urdu, 4.76% Lambadi and 2.72% Hindi as their first language.

== Economy ==
- Medium-scale industries and Cement Corporation Of India (CCI)'s cement factories are established at Tandur.
- Another major company is Hyderabad Chemicals and Fertilizers, established at Moula-Ali in 1942.

In 2006 the Indian government named Ranga Reddy one of the country's 250 most backward districts (out of a total of 640). It is one of the 33 districts in Telangana currently receiving funds from the Backward Regions Grant Fund Programme (BRGF).

As of 2025, Ranga Reddy district has the highest per-capita GDP in India.

== Administrative divisions ==
The district will have five revenue divisions: Chevella, Ibrahimpatnam, Rajendranagar, Kandukur and Shadnagar. They are sub-divided into 27 mandals. Amoy Kumar IAS is the present collector of the district.

=== Municipalities/municipal corporations ===
There are 14 Municipalities and 3 municipal corporations in Ranga Reddy district. They are Adibatla, Amangal, Badangpet, Bandlaguda Jagir, Chevella, Ibrahimpatnam, Jalpally, Manikonda, Meerpet, Moinabad, Narsingi, Pedda Amberpet, Shadnagar, Shamshabad, Shankarpally, Thukkuguda, Thurkayamjal.

=== Mandals ===
The table below categorizes mandals into their respective revenue divisions in the district:

#	Chevella revenue division	Ibrahimpatnam revenue division	Kandukur revenue division	Rajendranagar revenue division	Shadnagar revenue division
1	Chevella	Abdullapuramet	Amangal	Gandipet	Chowderguda
2	Moinabad	Hayathnagar	Balapur	Rajendranagar	Farooqnagar
3	Shahbad	Ibrahimpatnam	Kandukur	Serilingampally	Keshampeta
4	Shankarpalle	Madgul	Kadthal	Shamshabad	Kondurg
5		Manchal	Maheswaram		Kothur
6		Yacharam	Talakondapalle		Nandigama
7		Irwin	Saroornagar		

=== Villages ===
- Bacharam
- Bakaram Jagir
- Bandamadharam
- Barkathpally
- Chakrampally
- Eliminedu
- Gaddamallaiahguda
- Girmapur
- Hajipalle
- Injapur
- Kammeta
- Koheda
- Kawadipally
- Korremula
- Medipally Nakkartha
- Nagaram, Shamshabad mandal
- Nagireddiguda
- Ponnal
- Sreerangavaram

=== Assembly constituencies ===
There are eight assembly constituencies in Ranga Reddy district. They are Chevella, Rajendranagar, L. B. Nagar, Shadnagar, Kalwakurthy, Serlingampally, Ibrahimpatnam and Maheshwaram.

== See also ==
- List of districts in Telangana
