= Himmat Pura Anand Basti =

Himmat pura anand basti
- Founded: 1670
- Type: residence area
- Location: Hyderabad, India
- Key people: Sonu & Khaleel Baba

Himmat Pura Anand Basti is a historic locality in the surroundings of Charminar. It is a 500 year old locality which was established during the reign of the Nizam of Hyderabad.

The biggest landmark in the locality was two storied building Hidayath Manzil & Rashid Manzil that time, during those days only few buildings were erected. Most of the dwellings were Kutcha houses and only few residence were pucca houses.

It has a renowned old mosque, Chamkura Masjid, where residents offer their congregational prayers in large numbers.
