= Char Kaman =

Four historical arches in Hyderabad, India

Coordinates: 17°21′44″N 78°28′29″E

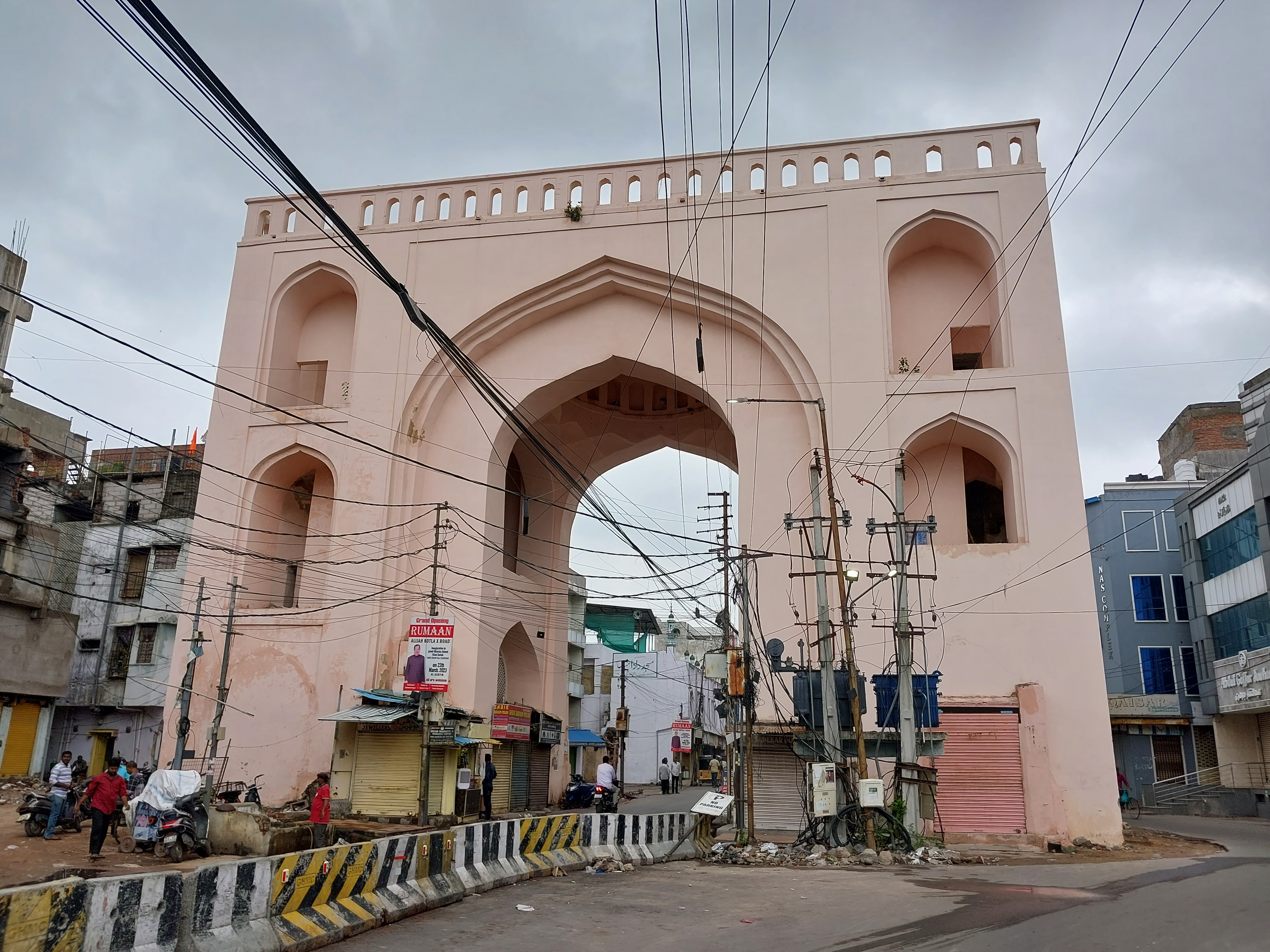
- Kali Kaman, one of the four archways
- Interactive map of Char Kaman
- Type: Arch

History
- Founder: Muhammad Quli Qutb Shah
- Built: 1592; 434 years ago

Site notes
- Area: Old City, Hyderabad
- Architect: Mir Mu'min Astarabadi
- Architectural style: Indo-Islamic architecture
- Owner: Government of Telangana

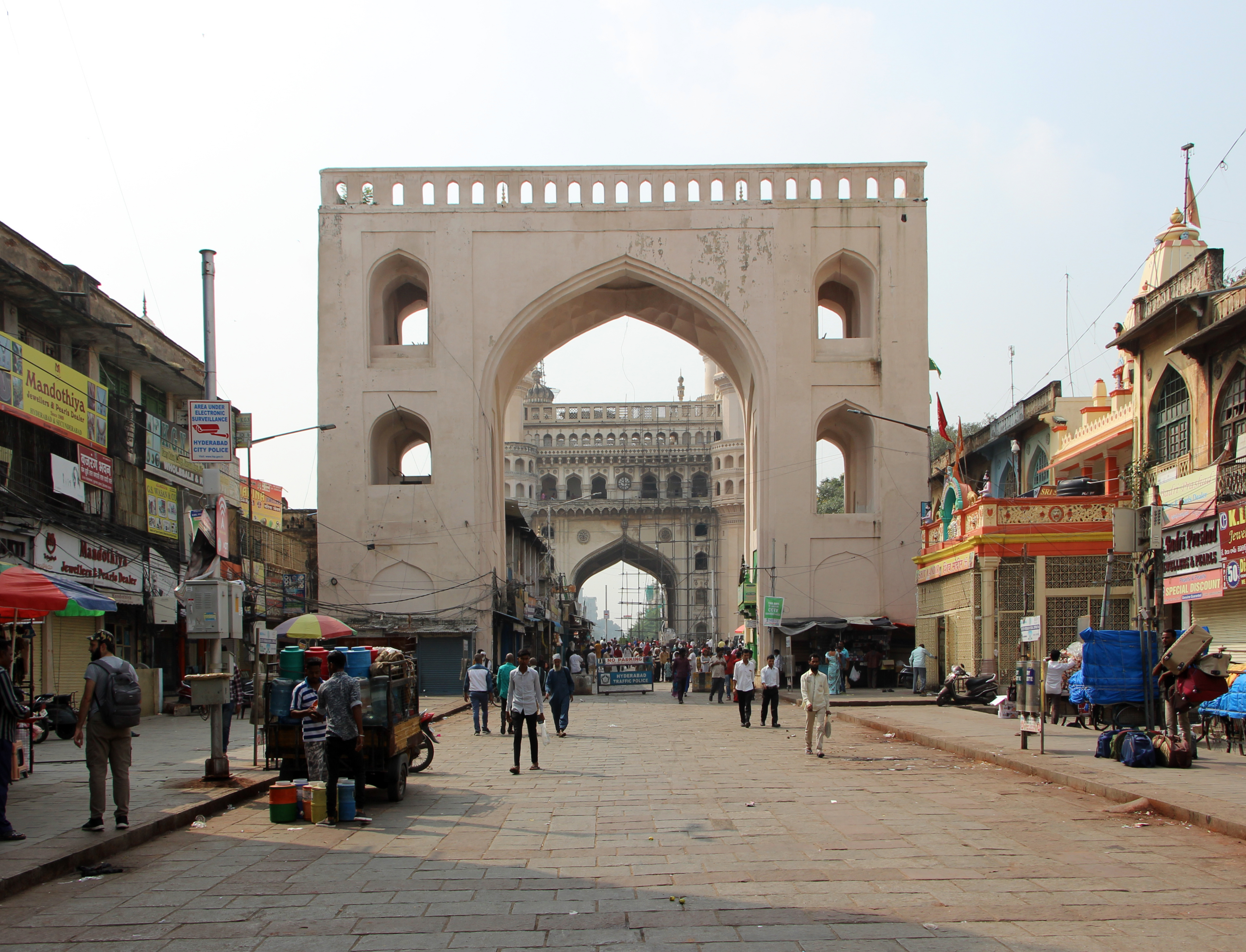
The Charminar seen through the Charminar Kaman

Char Kaman (literally meaning "four gates") are four historical arches in Hyderabad, India. Originally demarcating an open square, they face the four cardinal directions.

== Background ==
In the late 16th century, Muhammad Quli Qutb Shah, the ruler of the Golconda Sultanate, founded the city of Hyderabad, which was to serve as the new capital of the kingdom. The city plan was designed by Mir Mu'min Astarabadi, an Iranian scholar and architect. The Charminar formed the centerpiece of the new city. The four arches of the Char Kaman are located directly to the south of the Charminar.

The arches demarcated a piazza, called the Jilu Khana, which was surrounded by the royal palaces and the Charminar. Every morning, the noblemen along with their retinue would pass through the square, where the retinue would be left behind, while the noblemen would proceed for an audience with the sultan. In the center of the square is the Gulzar Houz, an octagonal cistern, served to provide drinking water to the waiting attendants, as well as soldiers who would stand guard along the gates of the royal residence. The arches were completed in 1592.

Some scholars, including M. A. Nayeem, draw parallels between the piazza formed by the arches and the Naqsh-e Jahan Square in Isfahan, since Mir Mu'min was Iranian himself. However, the construction of the square in Isfahan began in 1598, by which time the Char Kaman complex had been completed and was already in use. The complex may be of Timurid inspiration, conceptually resembling the Registan in Samarkand.

The practice of building elaborate portals facing the cardinal directions is reminiscent of a Hindu architectural tradition popular in the Deccan, with the most famous example being the Kakatiya Kala Thoranam. The grand gateway of the Atala Mosque is also considered to be the forerunner of elaborate Indo-Islamic gateways including the Char Kaman and the nearby Charminar.

According to historian Ghulam Yazdani, another motivation behind their construction might have been the fact that the flagbearers of the royal processions, mounted upon elephants, might have had to dismount or lower their banners when passing through smaller gateways. The arches are large enough to allow an elephant, with a canopy upon its back, to pass through.

== Description ==
Each of the arches is approximately 60 feet tall, 36 feet wide at the base, and six feet in thickness. They are separated from the center of the piazza by nearly 375 feet in each case. They are built in the Qutb Shahi style, with the characteristic pointed arch, interpreted by some scholars to represent the unity of God.

The southern arch, directly facing the Charminar, is called the Charminar Kaman.

The northern arch is called the Machli Kaman (literally "fish gateway") since a large fish made up of bamboo and paper would be suspended in the center of the arch on every lunar new year, as a symbol of prosperity.

The eastern arch is called the Kali Kaman. (literally "black gate") It was originally called the Naqqar Khana. Drummers and musicians were accommodated in an elevated chamber atop this arch.

The western gateway, originally called Kaman Sher-i-'Ali, formed the eastern entrance to the royal palaces. In order to ward off any magic used against the royals, Mir Mu'min had erected a stone pillar by this gate, with Quranic verses and charms inscribed upon it. Due to this pillar, this gate was also known as the Kaman Sihr-i-Batil, which has now been corrupted to Kaman Sher-i-Batil. The complex of royal palaces, which extended up to the Musi river, was destroyed following the Siege of Golconda.

In 1858, the monument was rehabilitated by the fifth Nizam of Hyderabad, Afzal-ud-Daulah.

Charkaman is notified as a heritage structure by INTACH

Char Kaman or the four gates
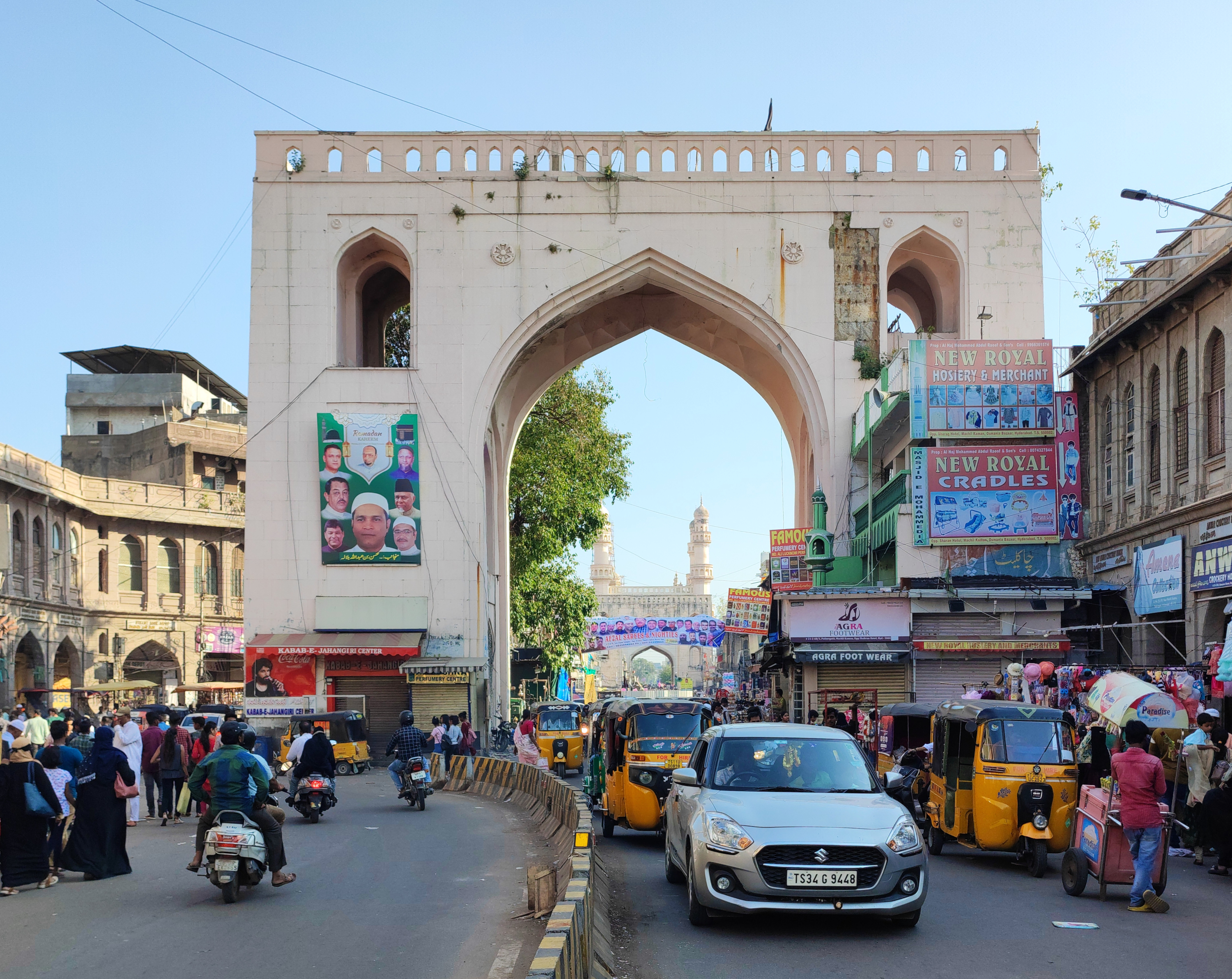
Machli Kaman (North)

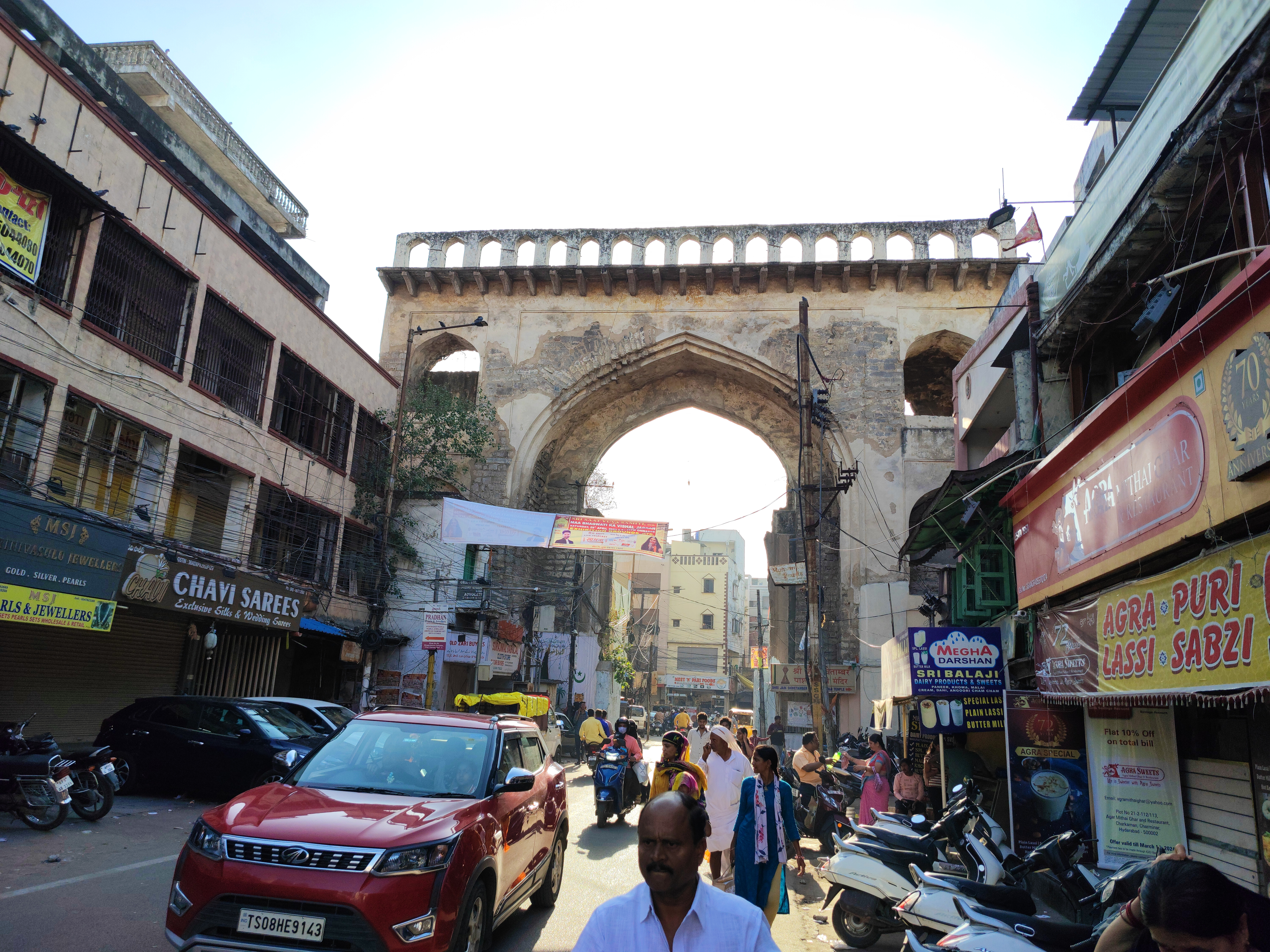
Sher-e-Batil-Ki-Kaman (West)

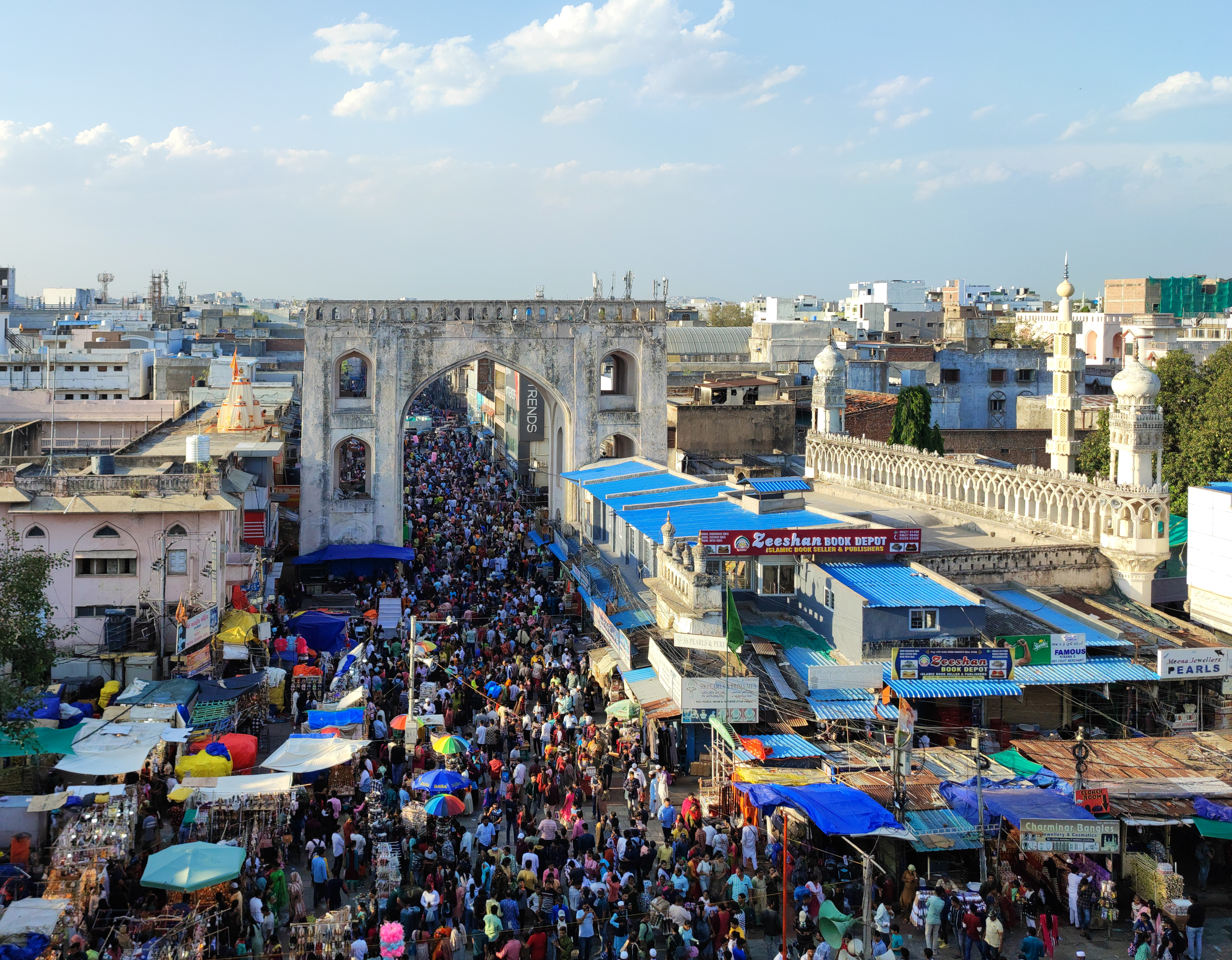
Charminar Kaman (South)

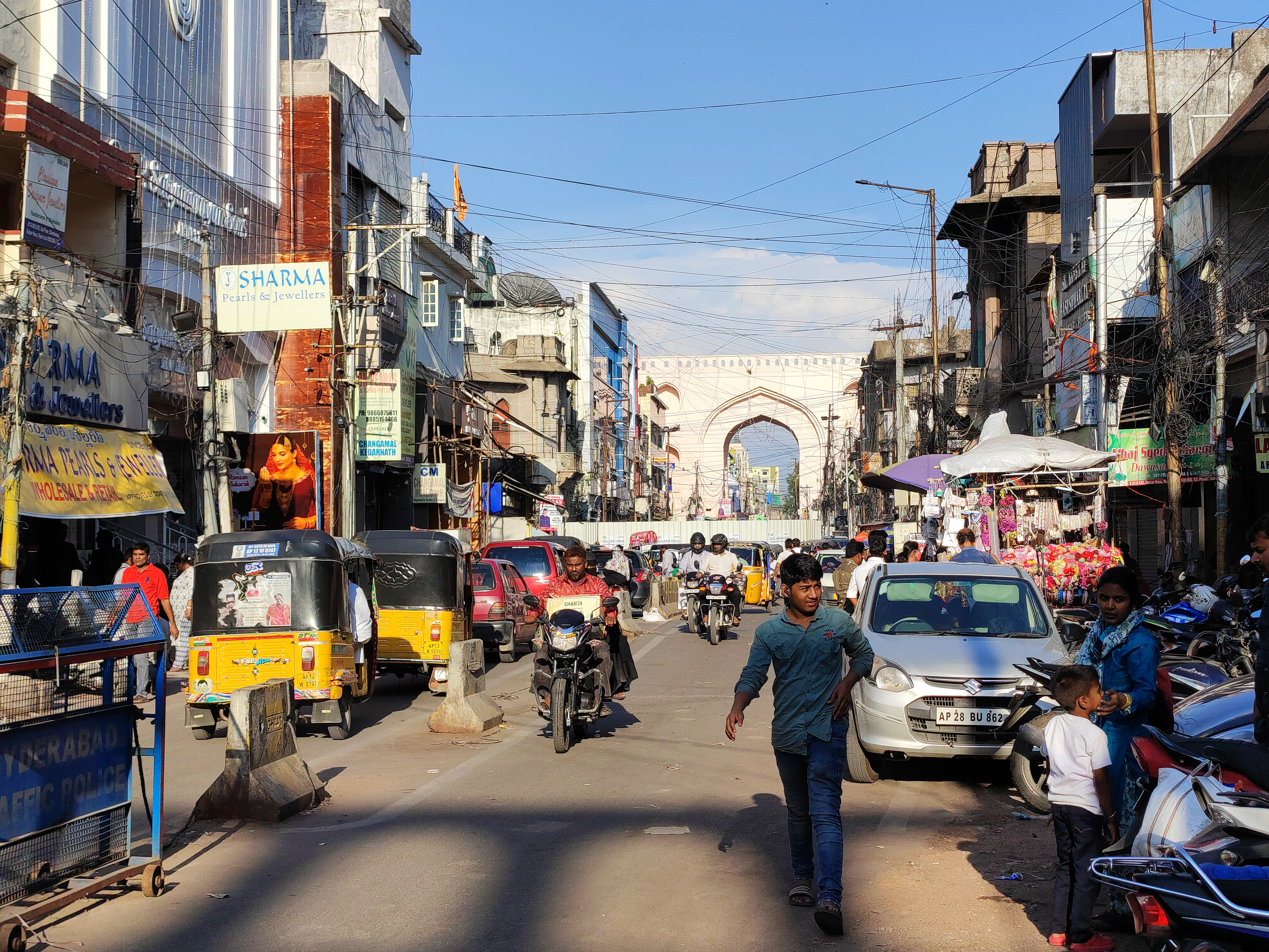
Kali Kaman (East)
