= Bhagyalakshmi Temple =

Hindu temple in Hyderabad, India

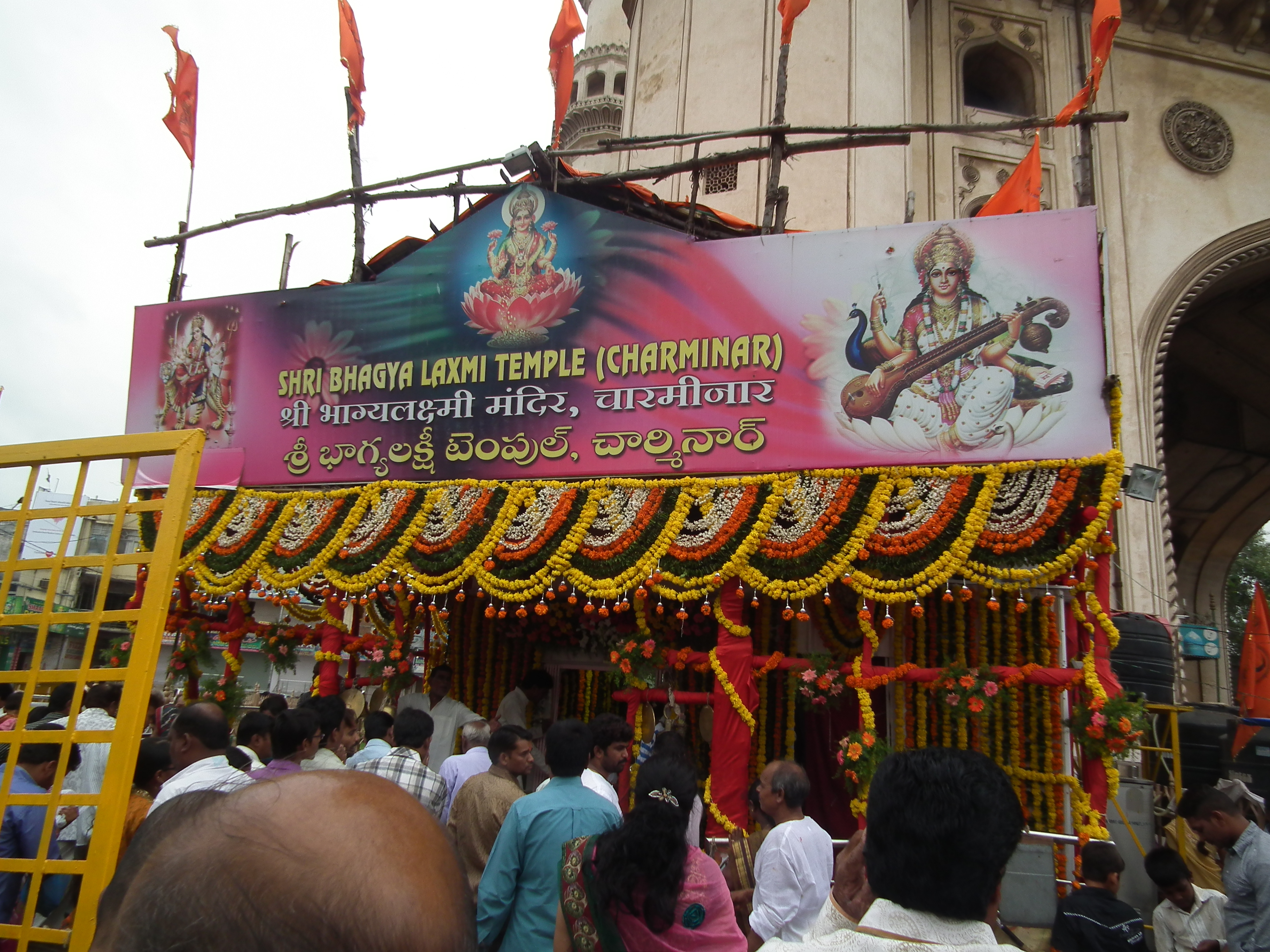
- Bhagyalakshmi Temple, Hyderabad

- Location within Telangana

Religion
- Affiliation: Hinduism
- District: Hyderabad
- Deity: Bhagyalakshmi

Location
- Location: Charminar, Ghansi Bazaar, Hyderabad, Telangana 500002
- State: Telangana
- Country: India
- Coordinates: 17°21′41″N 78°28′28″E

Architecture
- Temple: 1

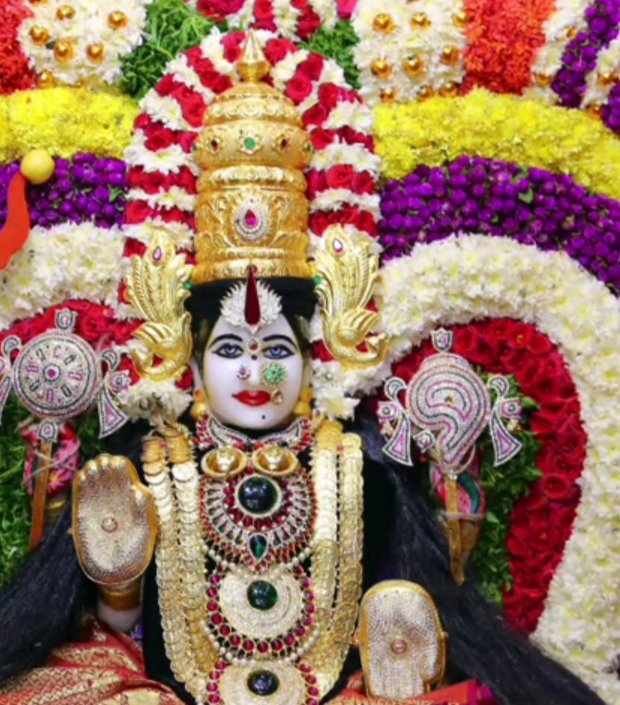
Goddess Bhagyalakshmi

Bhagyalakshmi temple is a shrine dedicated to a Hindu goddess located in Hyderabad, India. This temple is located adjacent to the city's historic monument Charminar. Charminar is under care of Archaeological Survey of India (ASI), while a Hindu trust manages the temple dedicated to the Goddess Bhagyalakshmi. The origin of the temple is currently disputed and the current structure that houses the idol was erected in the 1960s. In 2012, Telangana High Court stopped any further expansion of the temple. In 2013, ASI declared the temple structure as an unauthorised construction.

== History ==
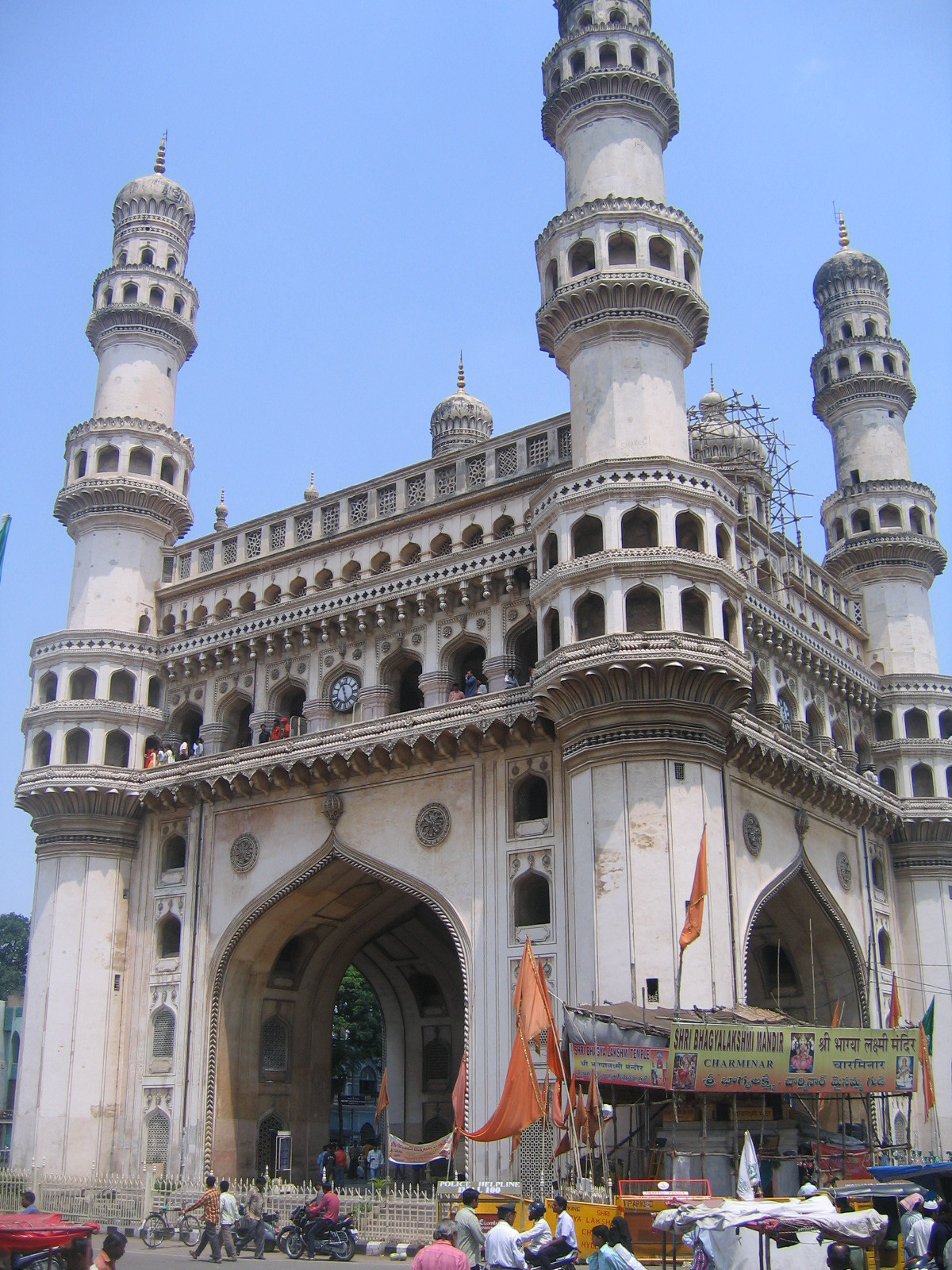
View of Historic Charminar, The Bhagyalakshmi Temple can be seen at the bottom right of the image

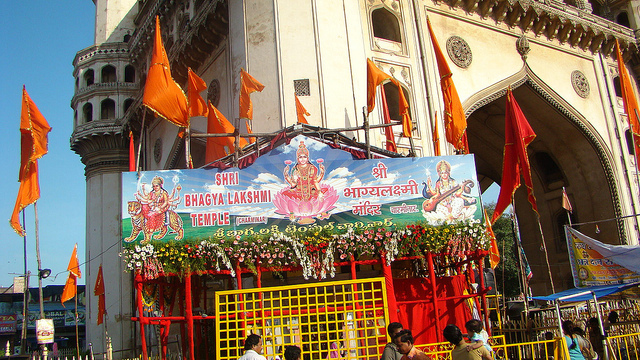
The temple

As per the local Telangana history and the Telugu name in the temple name board in View of Historic Charminar image, Bhagyalakshmi Goddess is worshipped as or along with Charminar Maisamma(in the stone form) and every year Bonalu is offered to her in the Ashada Masam.

According to the Muslim Priest of Charminar altar, the original stone in question was a guard stone placed near the corner to protect the walls of charminar from automobiles.

In 2012, Times of India reported citing old people that in the late 1960s, the temple building was built on the east side of Charminar and opened for visits by devotees. Times of India referred to the popular folklore that the holy stone was laid at the site several years ago at an unknown date, most likely since the Quli Qutub Shah period. The stone was worshipped as a sign of prosperity by residents. Others insist that the temple did not exist there until it was erected a few decades back and called the claims of the temple being "as old as the Charminar" as completely 'baseless' claims.

Claims of newer origins of temple are proposed by historians such as Narendra Luther, who claim the temple did not exist until the 1960s when it was erected un-necessarily by some locals. According to historians, one of the guard stone similar in shape to a milestone near Charminar was painted with saffron color in 1965, and an old woman became the person in-charge of this shrine. After an Andhra Pradesh State Road Transport Corporation bus collided with the stone and damaged it, a pucca structure was created at the site. An idol of the goddess Lakshmi replaced the stone.

A case was filed in the High court, opposing the encroachment of Charminar by the temple authorities. High court ordered to maintain the status quo and banned any further construction of the temple.

Local Congress leader G. Niranjan considers the co-existence of the two structures as a reflection of the "composite culture" of Hyderabad. He claimed that Charminar had places of worship for both communities for several centuries and it was sending a message to the entire world about rich secular traditions and the Ganga-Jamuni tehzeeb ("composite culture") of Hyderabad. A book sources the name of the shrine in the memory of the Queen Bhagmati (or Bhagyavati).

== AMASR Act ==
The "Ancient Monuments and Archaeological Sites and Remains Act" or AMASR Act passed in 1958 is an act of parliament of the government of India that provides for the preservation of ancient and historical monuments and archaeological sites and remains of national importance.

The rules stipulate that area in the vicinity of the monument, within 100 meters is prohibited area. The area within 200 meters of the monument is regulated category. Any repair or modifications of buildings in this area requires prior permission. According to the ASI officials, the Bhagya Laxmi temple comes under the prohibited area of the monument Char Minar. Hence any activity that attempts to extend the structure is considered "illegal activity".

== Controversies ==
The temple has been a subject of friction between temple administration, who wish to expand the temple, and local Indian historical preservationists, who want to preserve historic Muslim Indian heritage of the Charminar. Since 1951, the Charminar is under the list of centrally protected monuments that are looked after by the ASI. In the 1960s, the replacement of the holy stone with an idol and the addition of a temporary shed evoked communal tensions. In 1979, the temple was vandalized by extremists when some local Hindu merchants allegedly refused to comply with a bandh protesting Grand Mosque Seizure.

During the Ganeshotsava celebrations in September 1983, Saffron organizations put up big cloth banners at a number of places in the area asking for the declaration of India as a Hindu republic. In this charged atmosphere, it was alleged a Muslim threw a stone at the temple. Saffron organisations desecrated a mosque in retaliation and placed idols and pictures of Hindu Gods which resulted in local Muslim leaders calling for a bandh. The riots that ensued led to 45 deaths.

During the night of 1 November 2012, the temple administration started to carry out illegal construction work without the permission of Archaeological Survey of India (ASI), stating that they were decorating the temple ahead of the Diwali festival by replacing old bamboo with new ones. The construction activity, which was illegal according to the ASI, was stopped by the police. Local Muslim politicians feared that the expansion might damage the historic Charminar, which they identify with Islamic heritage. This construction work at the temple premises triggered Hindu-Muslim tension in the city.

The temple authorities maintain that they were not planning an expansion and had only replaced the worn-out bamboo structures with new ones. A contingent of MIM party workers and five MLAs led by Akbaruddin Owaisi organized a rally, alleging that the police were facilitating the illegal expansion work. The police stopped the rally and took the MIM leaders into custody. Following this, a few violent incidents were reported in the city, including stone pelting and damage to four APSRTC buses, two cars, an ATM and a garments showroom. The city administration temporarily put a ban on the public visits to Charminar, shut down the nearby market and barricaded some of the streets. The police also prevented the Hindu leaders from organizing a march to the temple by taking the organizers into custody.

On 16 November 2012, more violence broke out after the Friday prayers at the Mecca Masjid. A large number of people proceeded towards Charminar after the prayers to offer 'salam'(salutation) at a religious symbol abutting the monument, but they were stopped by the police. The protesters started raising slogans against the police and demanded that restrictions be lifted. The protesters later pelted stones and attacked vehicles and shops. The police used teargas shells and baton charge to disperse the mobs. Seven people were injured during the violence.
