= Ali ibn Tayfur Bistami =

17th-century Iranian theologian, philosopher, and historian

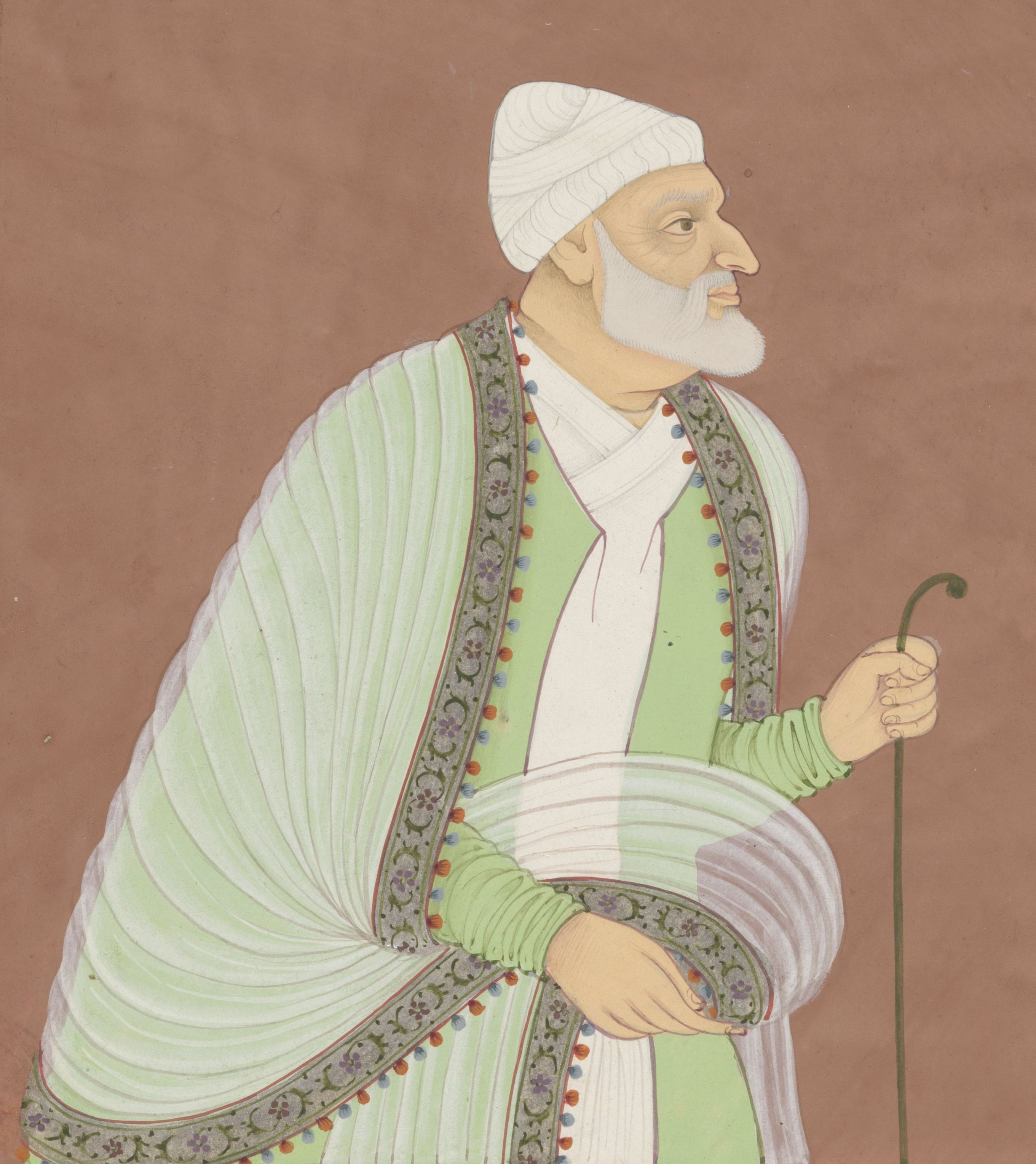
Portrait of Ali ibn Tayfur Bistami, dated 1686

Ali ibn Tayfur Bistami (Persian: علی بن طیفور بسطامی; fl. late 17th century) was an Iranian-born theologian, philosopher and historian in the Sultanate of Golconda. A native of Bistam in northern Iran, his patrons were his suzerain Abdullah Qutb Shah (r. 1626–1672) and countryman, the commander-in-chief Neknam Khan. For the latter, Bistami composed the Ganjnama dar hall-i-lughat-i-shahnama ("Treasure Book to Solve Words in the Book of Kings"), a dictionary for the outdated words used in the Persian epic Shahnameh ("Book of Kings").

After the collapse of the Sultanate of Golconda in 1686, Bistami returned to Iran.

== Sources ==
- Dayal, Subah (2020). "On Heroes and History: Responding to the Shahnama in the Deccan, 1500–1800". In Overton, Keelan (ed.). Iran and the Deccan: Persianate Art, Culture, and Talent in Circulation, 1400–1700. Indiana University Press. pp. 421–446. ISBN 978-0253048912.
- Overton, Keelan (2020). "Introduction to Iranian Mobilities and Persianate Mediations in the Deccan". In Overton, Keelan (ed.). Iran and the Deccan: Persianate Art, Culture, and Talent in Circulation, 1400–1700. Indiana University Press. pp. 3–76. ISBN 978-0253048912.
- Nayeem, M. A. (1985). "ʿAlī b. Ṭayfūr". In Yarshater, Ehsan (ed.). Encyclopædia Iranica (Online ed.). Encyclopædia Iranica Foundation. ISBN 978-0933273719.
