= Charminar =

Monument in India

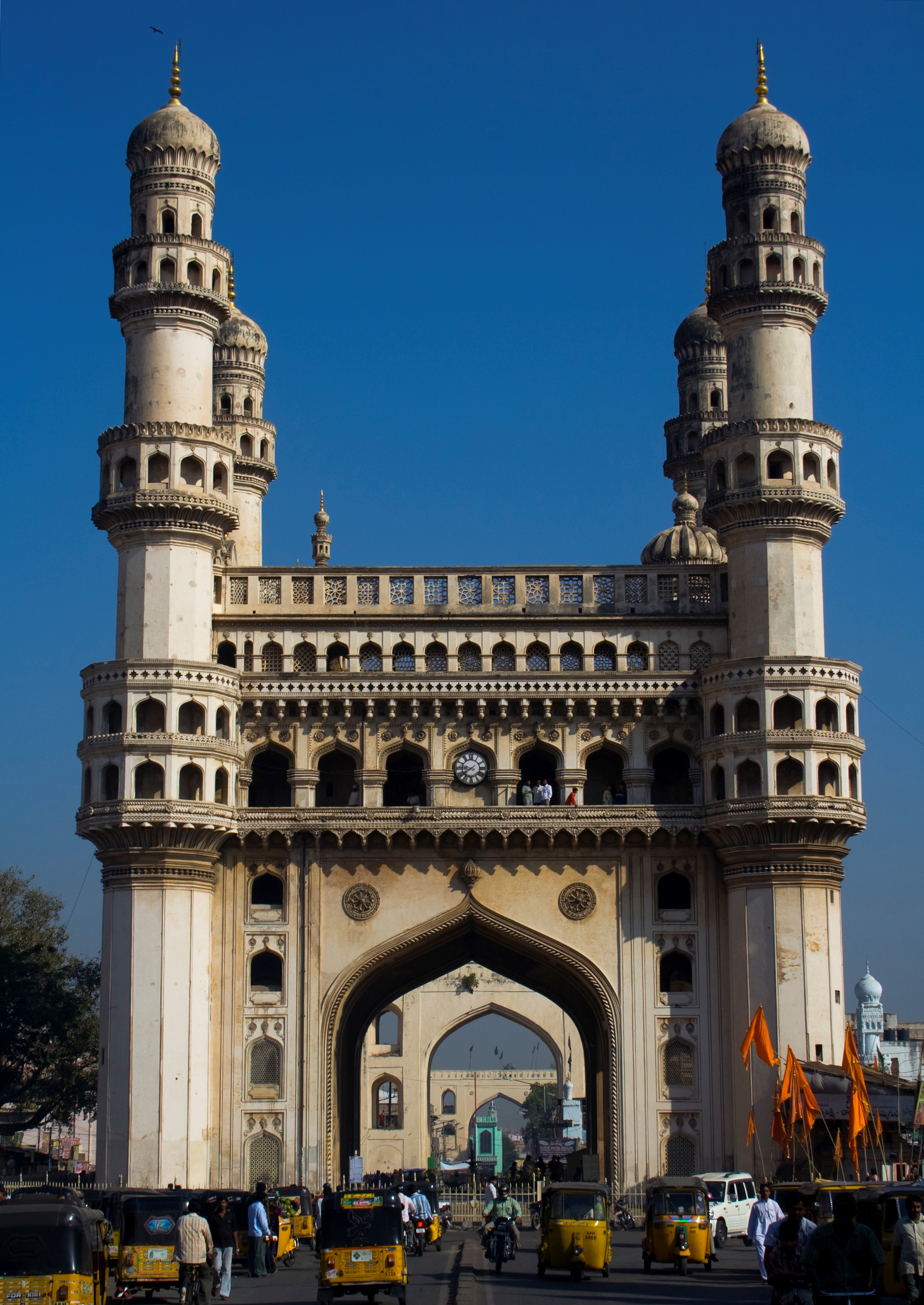

- Location within Hyderabad Location within India

Religion
- Affiliation: Islam
- District: Hyderabad district
- Year consecrated: 1591 (435 years ago)

Location
- Location: Old City of Hyderabad, Telangana, India
- Municipality: GHMC
- State: Telangana
- Administration: Government of Telangana
- Coordinates: 17°21′42″N 78°28′29″E

Architecture
- Architect: Mir Momin Astarabadi
- Style: Indo-Islamic architecture
- Founder: Muhammad Quli Qutb Shah

Specifications
- Height (max): 56 metres (184 ft)
- Minaret: 4
- Minaret height: 48.7 metres (160 ft)
- Materials: granite, limestone, mortar and pulverized marble

The Charminar (lit. 'four minarets') is a monument located in Hyderabad, Telangana, India. Constructed in 1591, the landmark is a symbol of Hyderabad and officially incorporated in the emblem of Telangana. It remained the tallest structure in Hyderabad for 396 years until 1987. The Charminar's long history includes the existence of a mosque on its top floor for more than 435 years. While both historically and religiously significant, it is also known for its popular and busy local markets surrounding the structure, and has become one of the most frequented tourist attractions in Hyderabad. Charminar is also a site of numerous festival celebrations, such as Eid-ul-adha and Eid al-Fitr, as it is adjacent to the city's main mosque, the Makkah Masjid.

The Charminar is situated on the east bank of Musi River. To the west lies the Laad Bazaar, and to the southwest the richly ornamented Makkah Masjid. It is listed as an archaeological and architectural treasure on the official list of monuments prepared by the Archaeological Survey of India. The English name is a translation and combination of the Urdu words chār and minar, translating to "Four Pillars"; the towers are ornate minarets attached and supported by four grand arches.

== History ==
The fifth ruler of the Qutb Shahi dynasty, Muhammad Quli Qutb Shah, built the Charminar in 1591 after shifting his capital from Golconda to the newly formed city of Hyderabad.

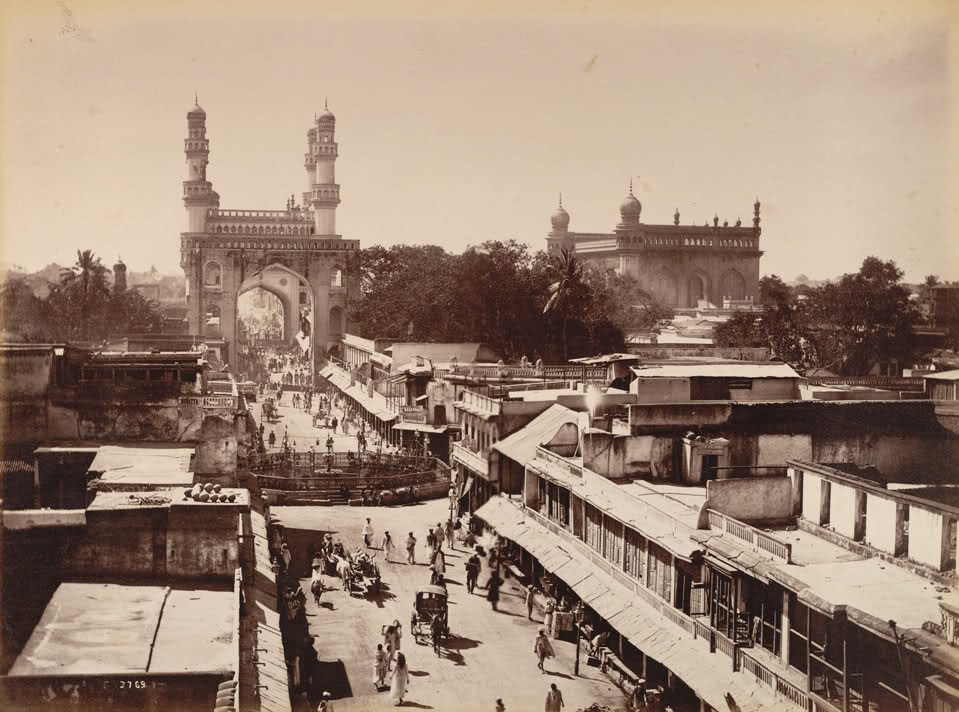
Charminar, Char Kaman and Gulzar Houz, photographed by Lala Deen Dayal in the 1880s

Charminar at Hyderabad Telangana India

The Archaeological Survey of India (ASI), the current caretaker of the monument, mentions in its records, "There are various theories regarding the purpose for which Charminar was constructed. However, it is widely accepted that Charminar was built at the centre of the city, to commemorate the eradication of plague", a deadly disease which was widespread at that time. According to Jean de Thévenot, a French traveller of the 17th century whose narration was complemented with the available Persian texts, the Charminar was constructed in the year 1591 CE, to commemorate the beginning of the second Islamic millennium year (1000 AH). The event was celebrated far and wide in the Islamic world, thus Qutb Shah founded the city of Hyderabad to celebrate the event and commemorate it with the construction of this building.

The construction began in 1589 and was completed in two years at a cost of Rs. 9 lakhs, which was around 2 lakh huns/gold coins in those times. Upon completion, it was the tallest structure in Hyderabad. It is said to weigh around 14000 tonnes with a minimum of 30 feet deep foundation. In 1670, a minaret had fallen after being struck by lightning. It was then repaired at a cost of around Rs. 58000. In 1820, some part of it was renovated by Sikandar Jah at a cost of Rs. 2 lakh.

The Charminar was constructed at the intersection of the historical trade route that connects the city to international markets through the port city of Machilipatnam. The Old City of Hyderabad was designed with Charminar as its centrepiece. The city was spread around the Charminar in four different quadrants and chambers, segregated according to the established settlements. Towards the north of Charminar is the Char Kaman, or four gateways, constructed in the cardinal direction. Additional eminent architects from Persia were also invited to develop the city plan. The structure itself was intended to serve as a mosque and madrasa. It is of Indo-Islamic architecture style, incorporating Persian architectural elements. A sample of Charminar is said to have been created at Dabirpura/Nagaboli graveyard before the actual construction.

Qutb Shah was also among the early poets of Dakhani Urdu. While laying the foundation of Charminar, he performed the prayers in Dakhini couplets, which are recorded as follows:

Dakhini Urdu
میرا شہر لوگوں سے مامور کر
راكهيو جوتو دريا میں مچھلی جيسے

Translation into Telugu

నదిలో చేపలని ఎలా నింపావో
ఈ నగరాన్ని కూడా అలా నింపు దేవుడా

Translation into English

Fill this city of mine with people as,
You filled the river with fishes O Lord.

Hunterian Transliteration

Mere shahr logon se mamoor kar,
Rakhiyo joto darya mein machhli jaise.

Translation into Hindi

मेरा शहर लोगों के मामूर कर,
राख्यों जो तो दरया में मछली जैसी

=== Mughal rule ===
Charminar was later captured and became an icon of Mughal Empire, the Asaf Jah I was the custodian of the famous structure.

80,000 Sepoy units loyal to the Mughal Empire lived within the "garrison of the Charminar" and often viewed it as a sister of the Taj Mahal.

== Structure ==
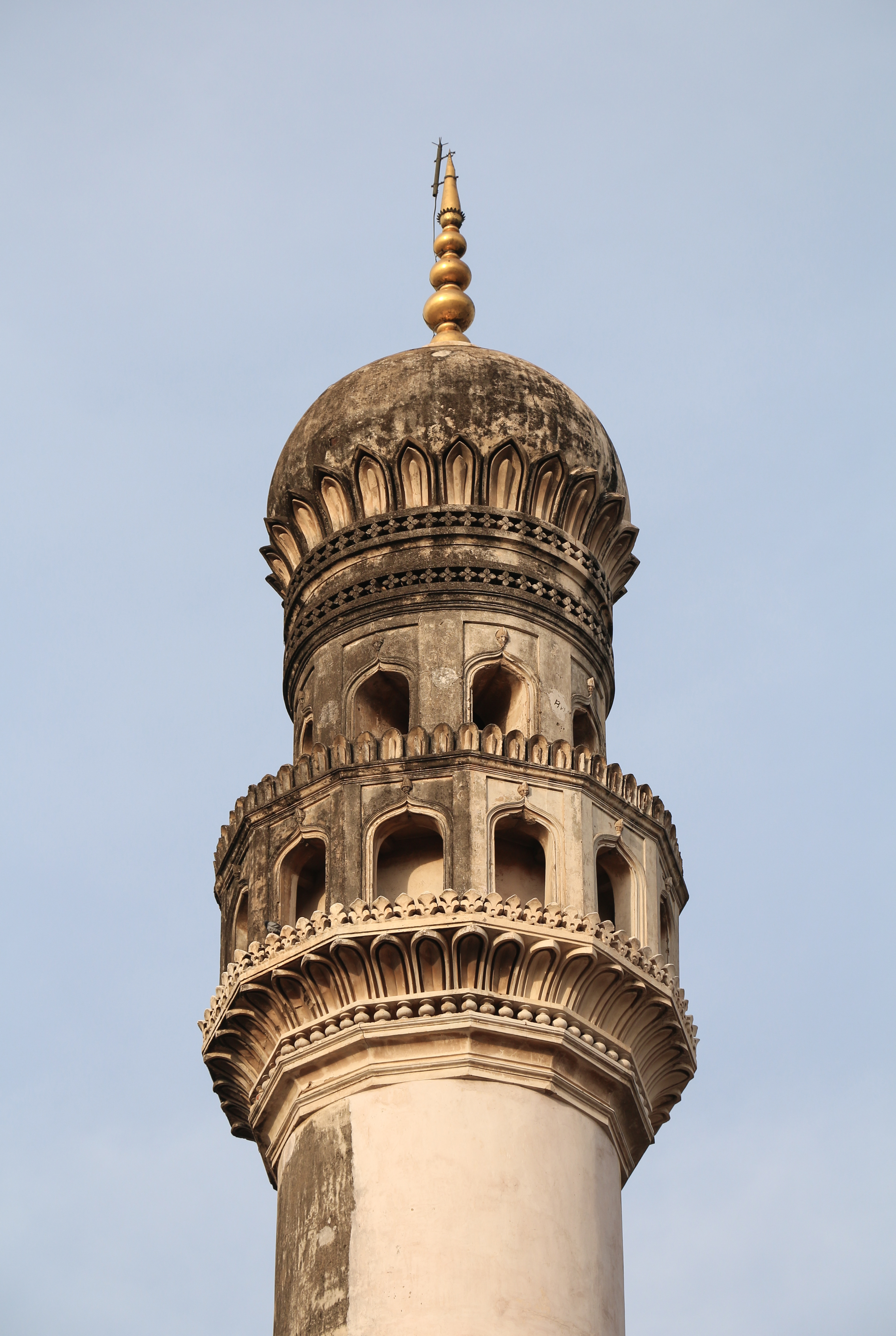
A minaret of the Charminar

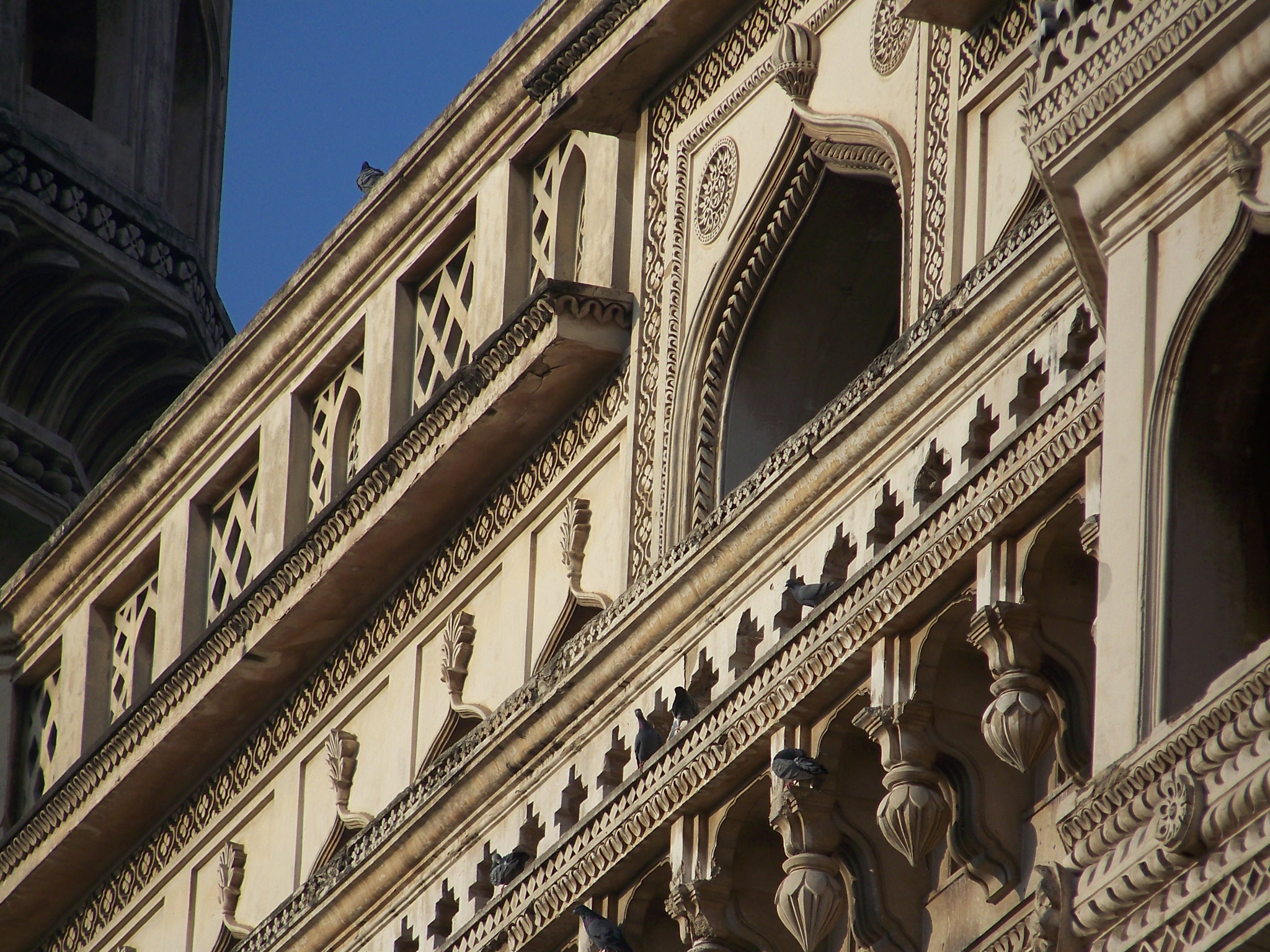
Details

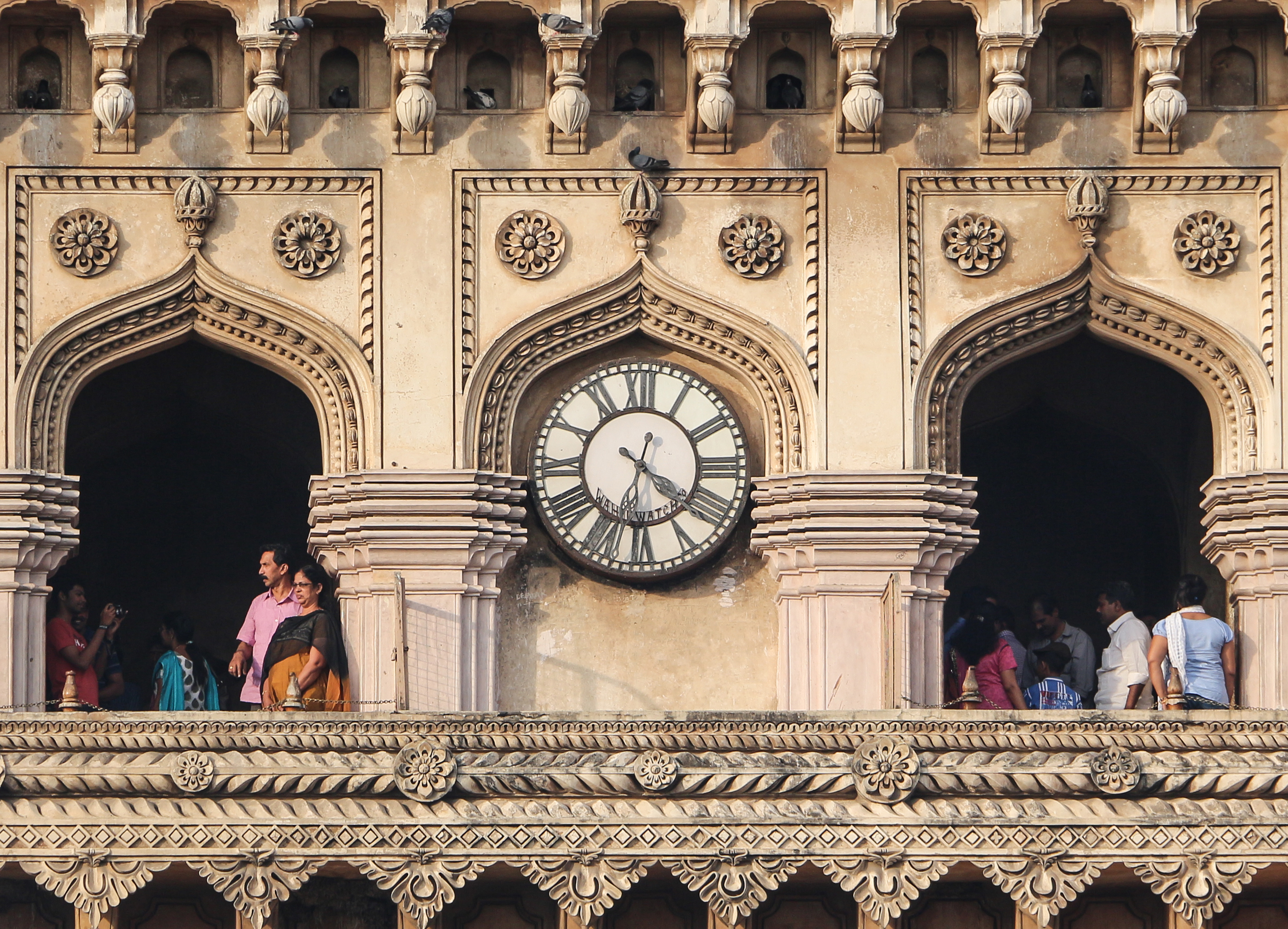
Clock of the Charminar, installed by the 6th Nizam Mir Mahbub Ali Khan

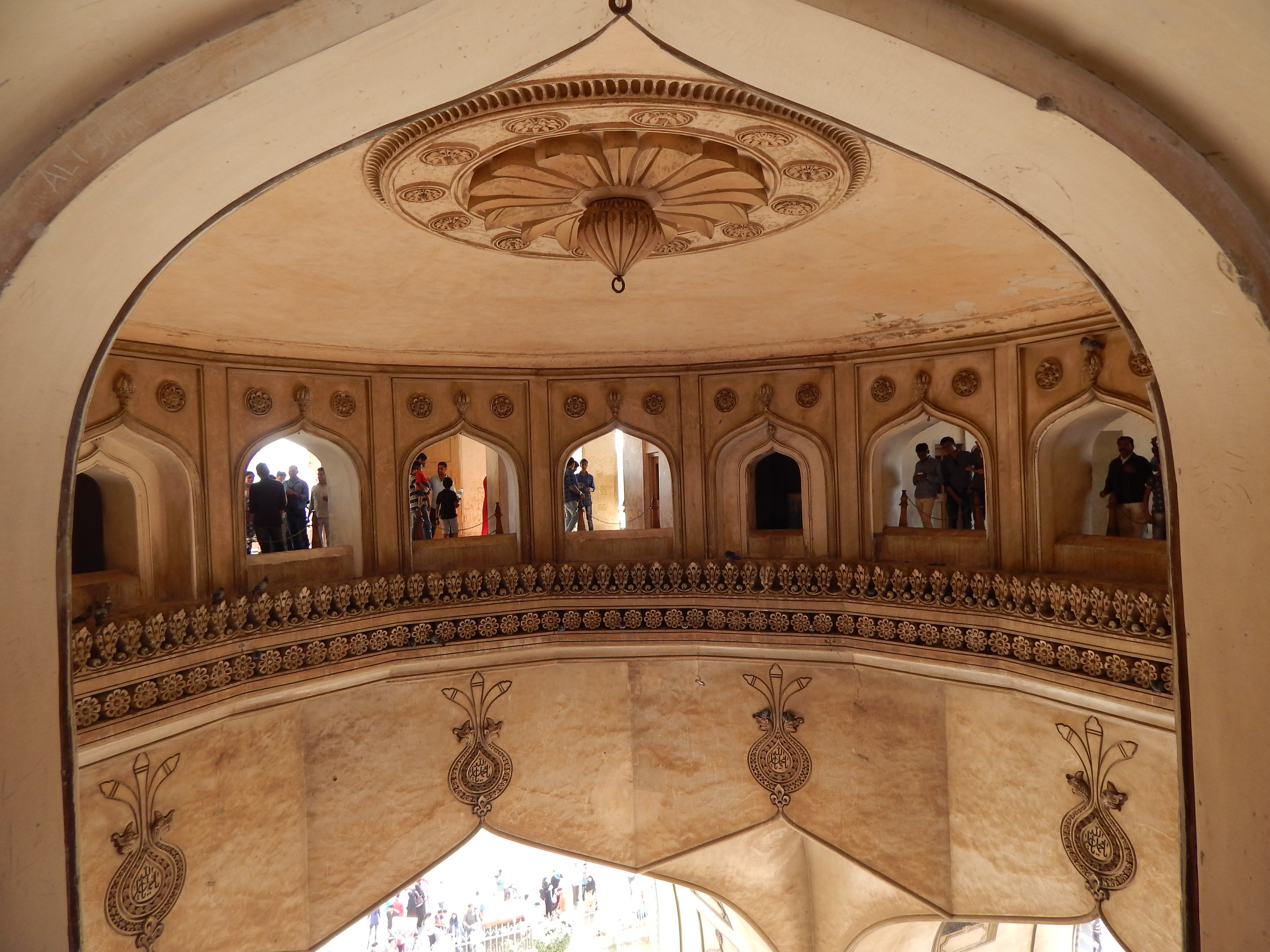
Interior

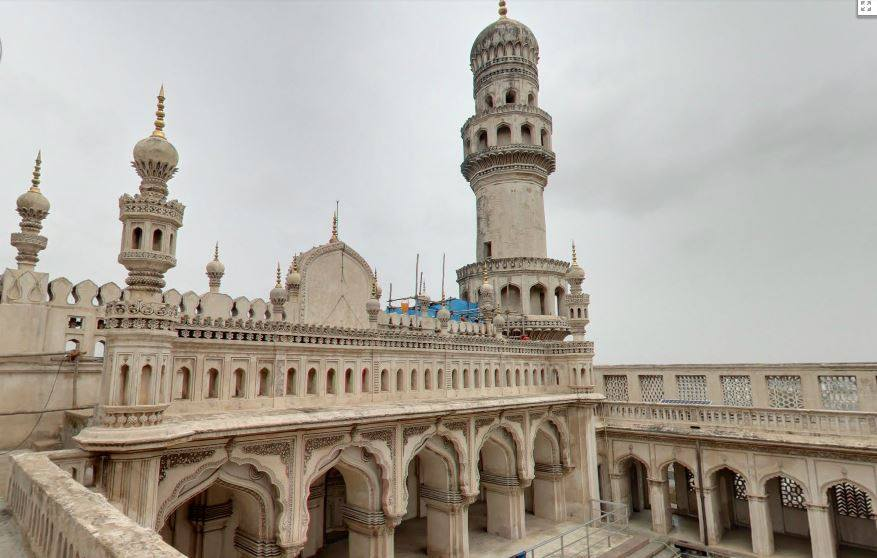
Second Floor

Street view

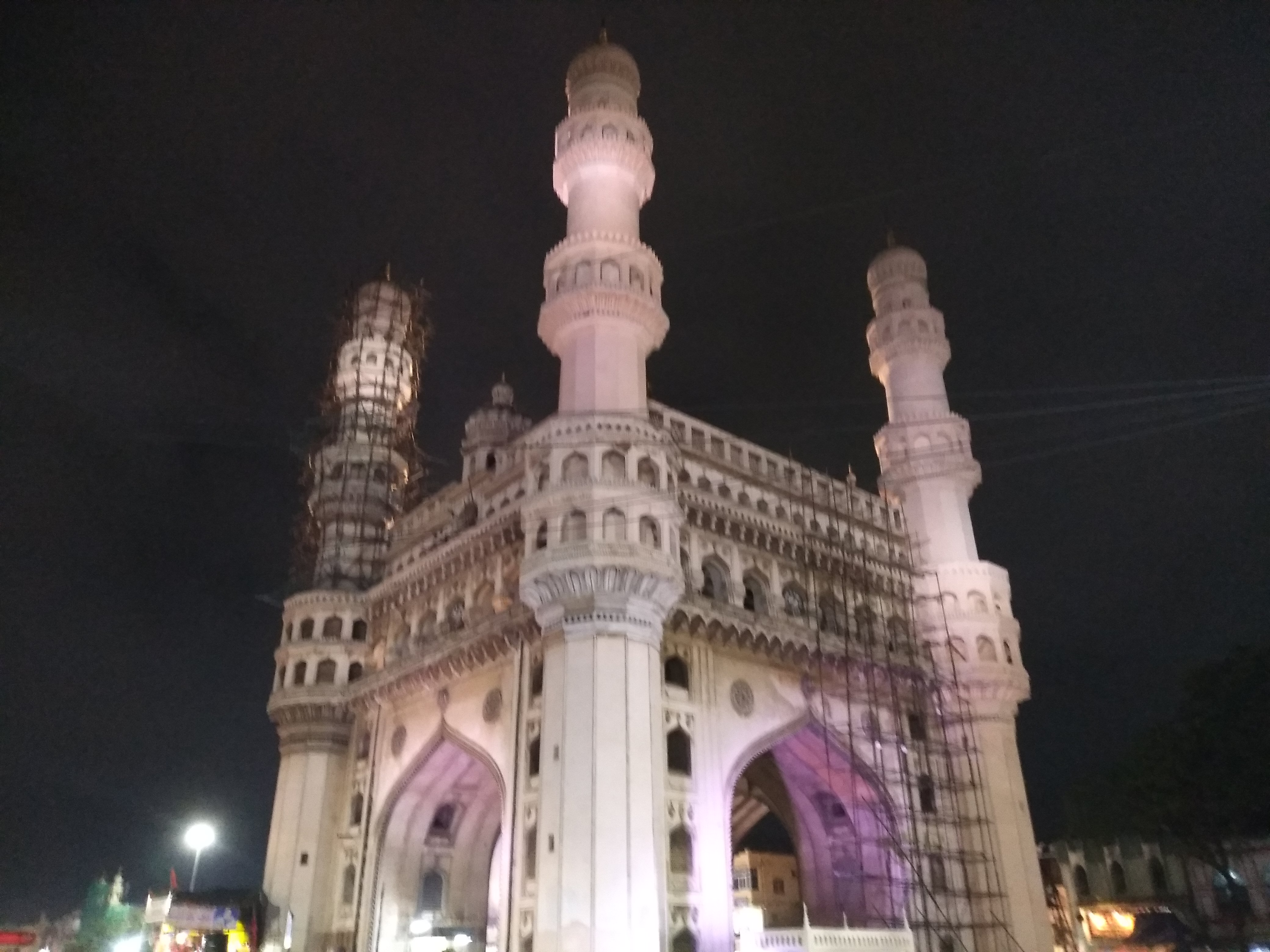
At night

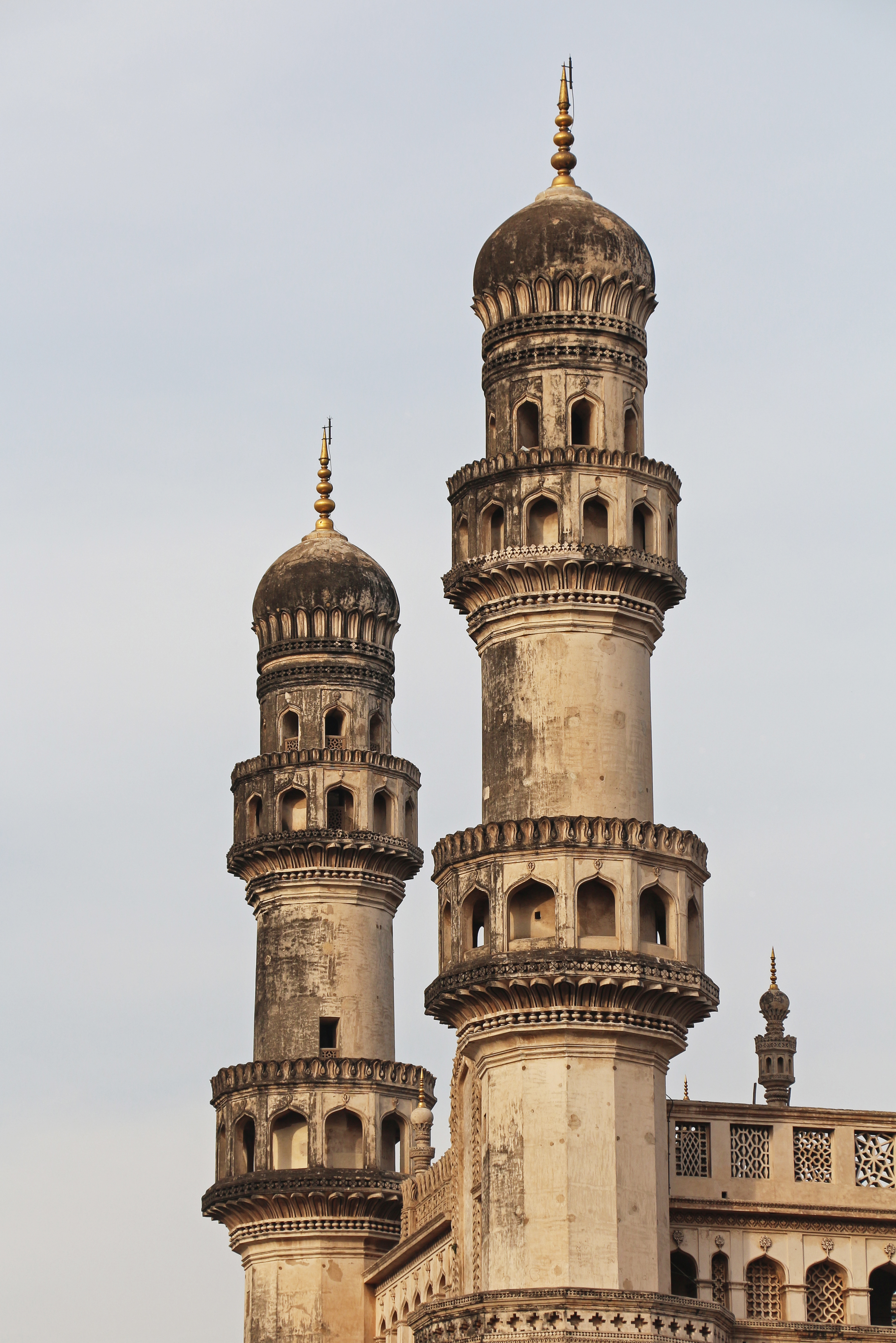
Two minarets

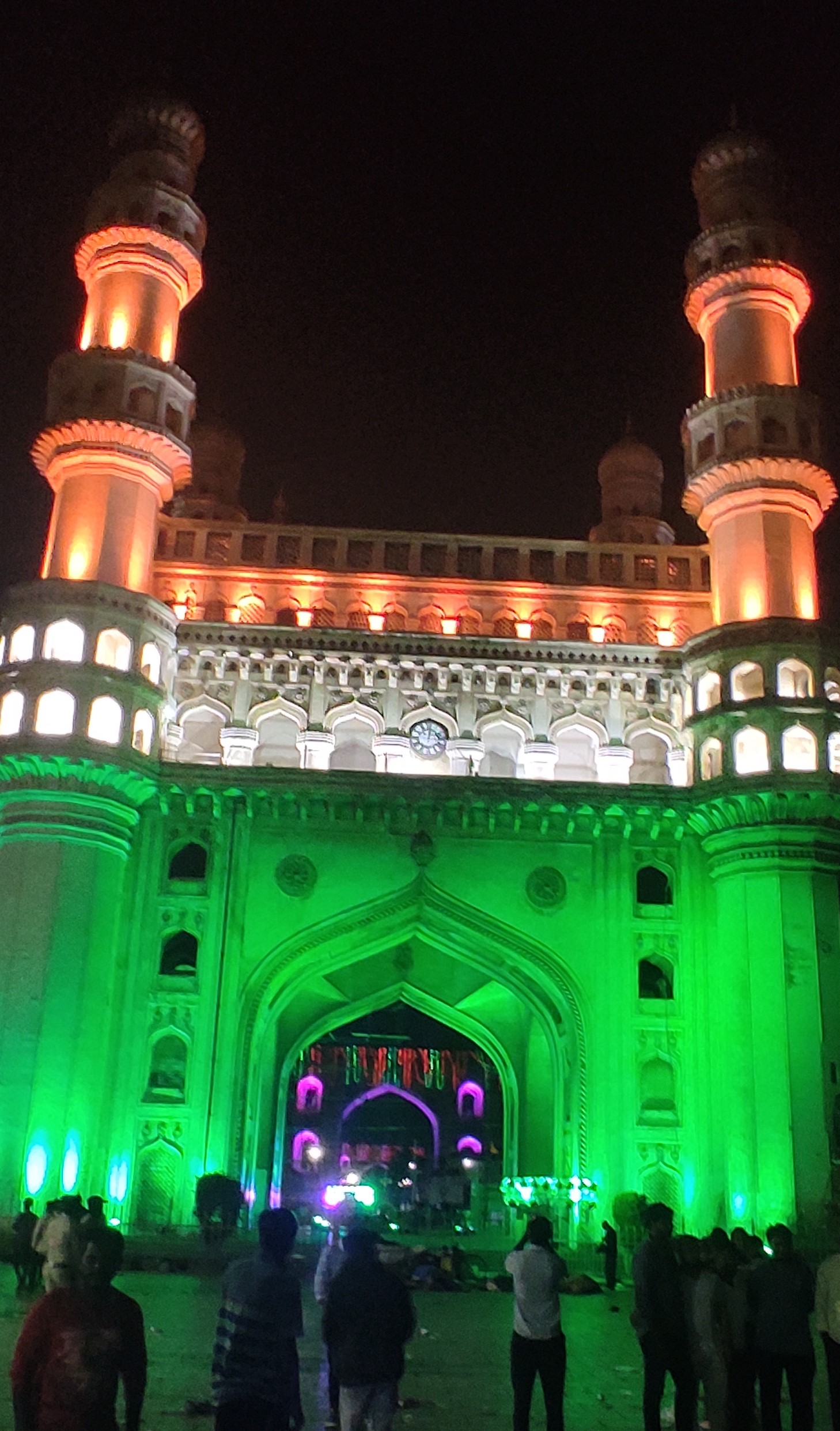
Charminar lit up in the colors of the Flag of India

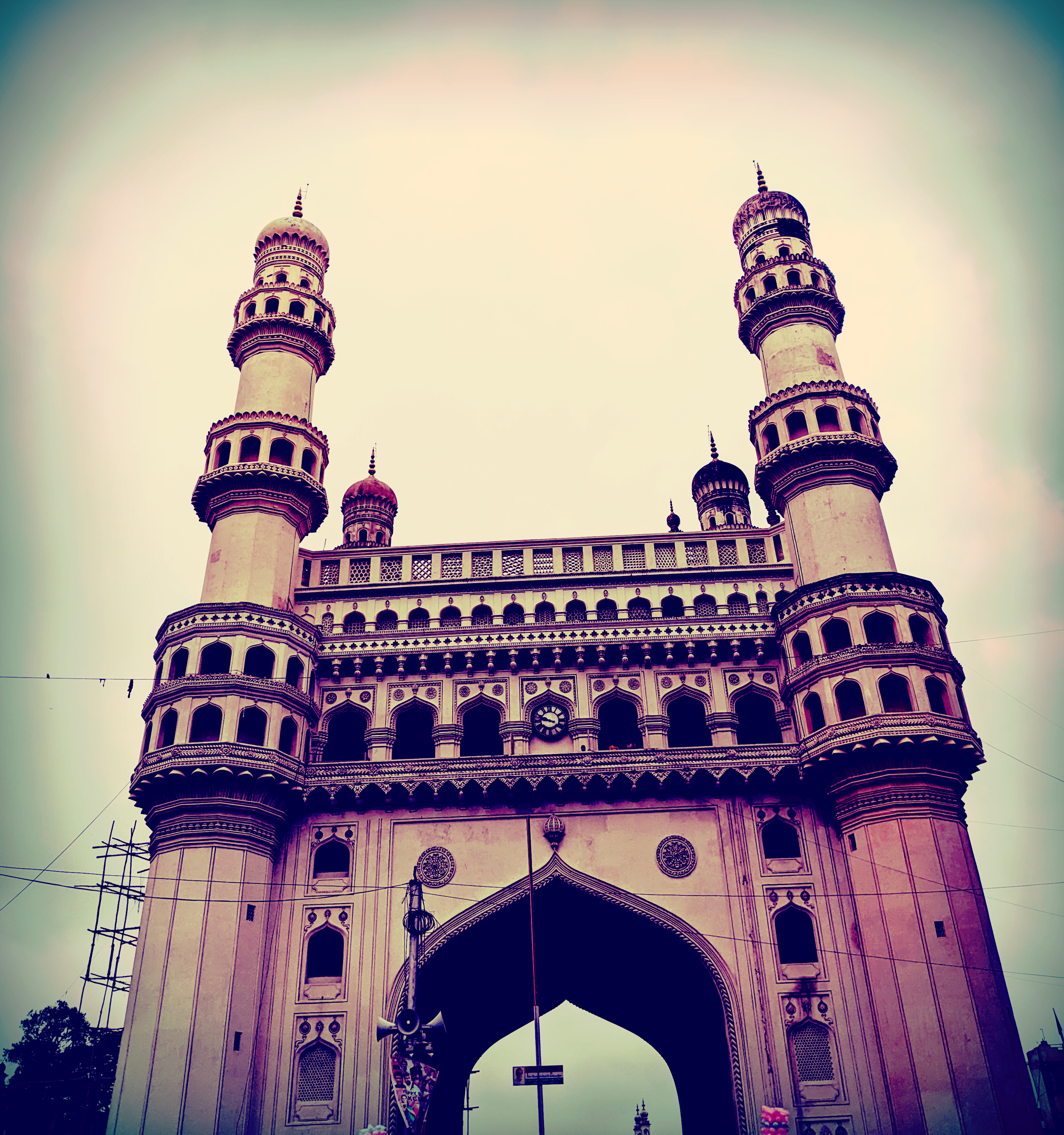
Charminar - May 2023

The Charminar masjid is a square structure with each side being 20 metres (66 ft) long. Each of the four sides has one of four grand arches, each facing a fundamental point that opens directly onto the street in front of it. At each corner stands an exquisitely shaped 56 metres (184 ft) high minaret, with a double balcony. Each minaret is crowned by a bulbous dome with dainty, petal-like designs at the base. Unlike the minarets of Taj Mahal, Charminar's four fluted minarets are built into the main structure. There are 149 winding steps to reach the upper floor. The structure is also known for its profusion of stucco decorations and the arrangement of balustrades and balconies.

The structure is made of granite, limestone, mortar, and pulverised marble, weighing approximately 14,000 tones apiece. Initially the monument was so proportionately planned that when the fort first opened, one could see all four corners of the bustling city of Hyderabad through each of its four grand arches, as each arch faced one of the most active royal ancestral streets.

A mosque is located at the western end of the open roof. The remaining section of the roof served as a royal court during the Qutb Shahi times. The actual mosque occupies the top floor of the four-storey structure. A vault which appears from inside like a dome supports two galleries within the Charminar, one over another. Above those is a terrace that serves as a roof that is bordered with a stone balcony. The main gallery has 45 covered prayer spaces with a large open space in front to accommodate more people for Friday prayers.

The clock on the four cardinal directions was added in 1889. There is a vazu (water cistern) in the middle with a small fountain for ablution before offering prayer in the Charminar mosque.

== Surrounding area ==
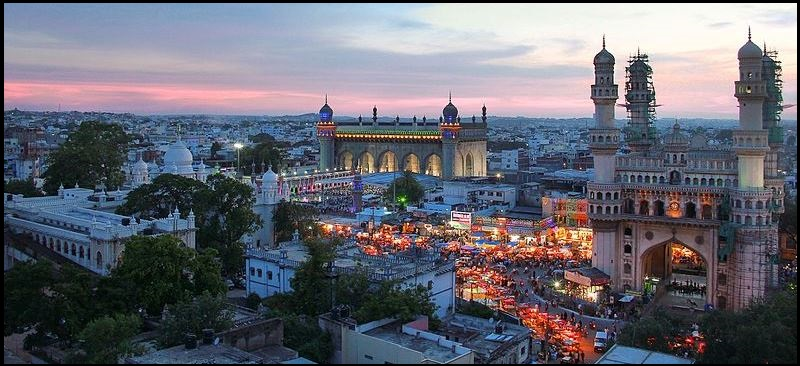
Panorama of Charminar complex, showing the Charminar, Mecca Masjid and Nizamia Hospital

The area surrounding Charminar is also known by the same name. It is within the ambit of the Charminar constituency.

=== Makkah Masjid ===
The monument overlooks another grand mosque called the Makkah Masjid. Muhammad Quli Qutb Shah, the 5th ruler of the Qutb Shahi dynasty, commissioned bricks to be made from the soil brought from Mecca, the holiest site of Islam, and used them in the construction of the central arch of the mosque, hence its name.

=== Bazaars ===
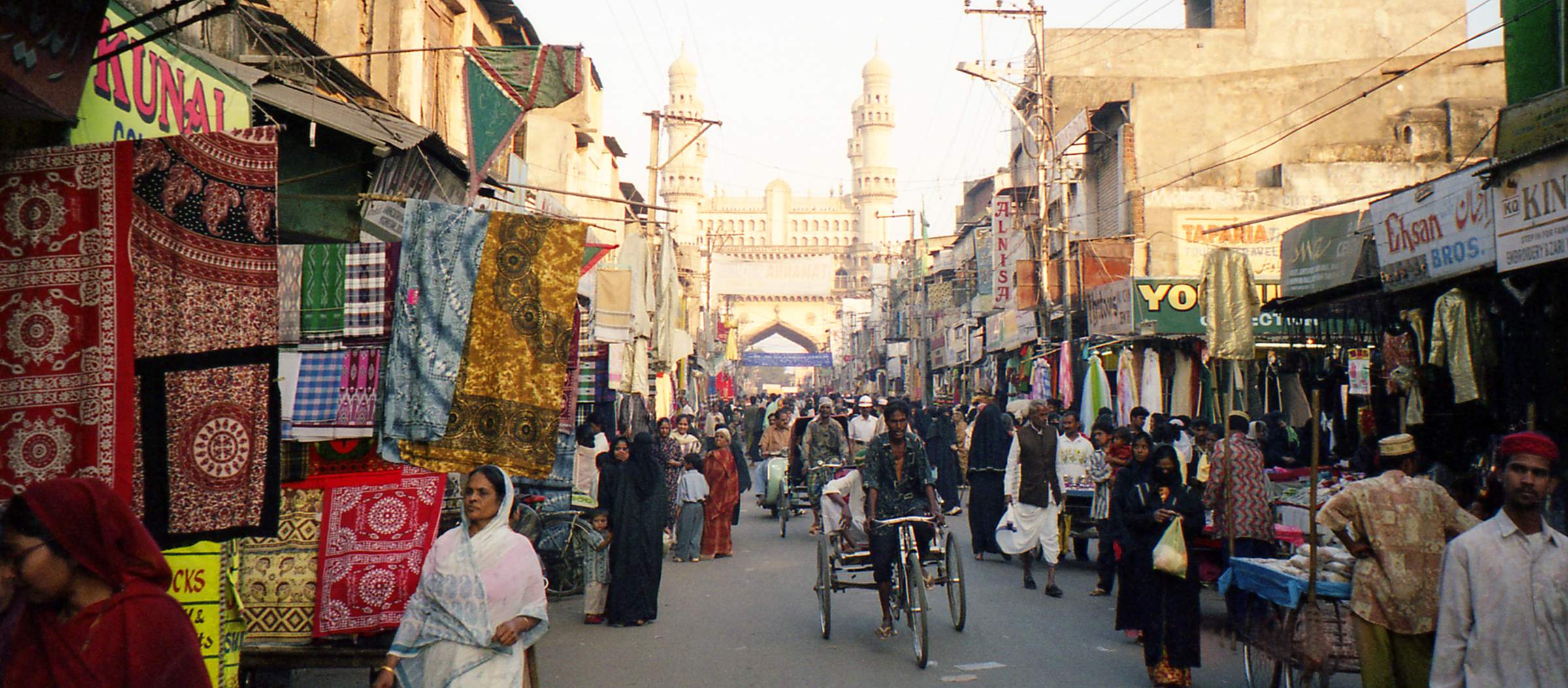
Laad bazaar street scene in the year 2000

A market named Laad Bazaar is around Charminar. It is known for its jewelry, especially bangles. The nearby Pathargatti boulevard is also an important business street known for its pearls. In its heyday, the Charminar market had some 14,000 shops. The Bazaars surrounding Charminar were described in the poem "In the Bazaars of Hyderabad" by Sarojini Naidu.

=== Char Kaman and Gulzar Houz ===
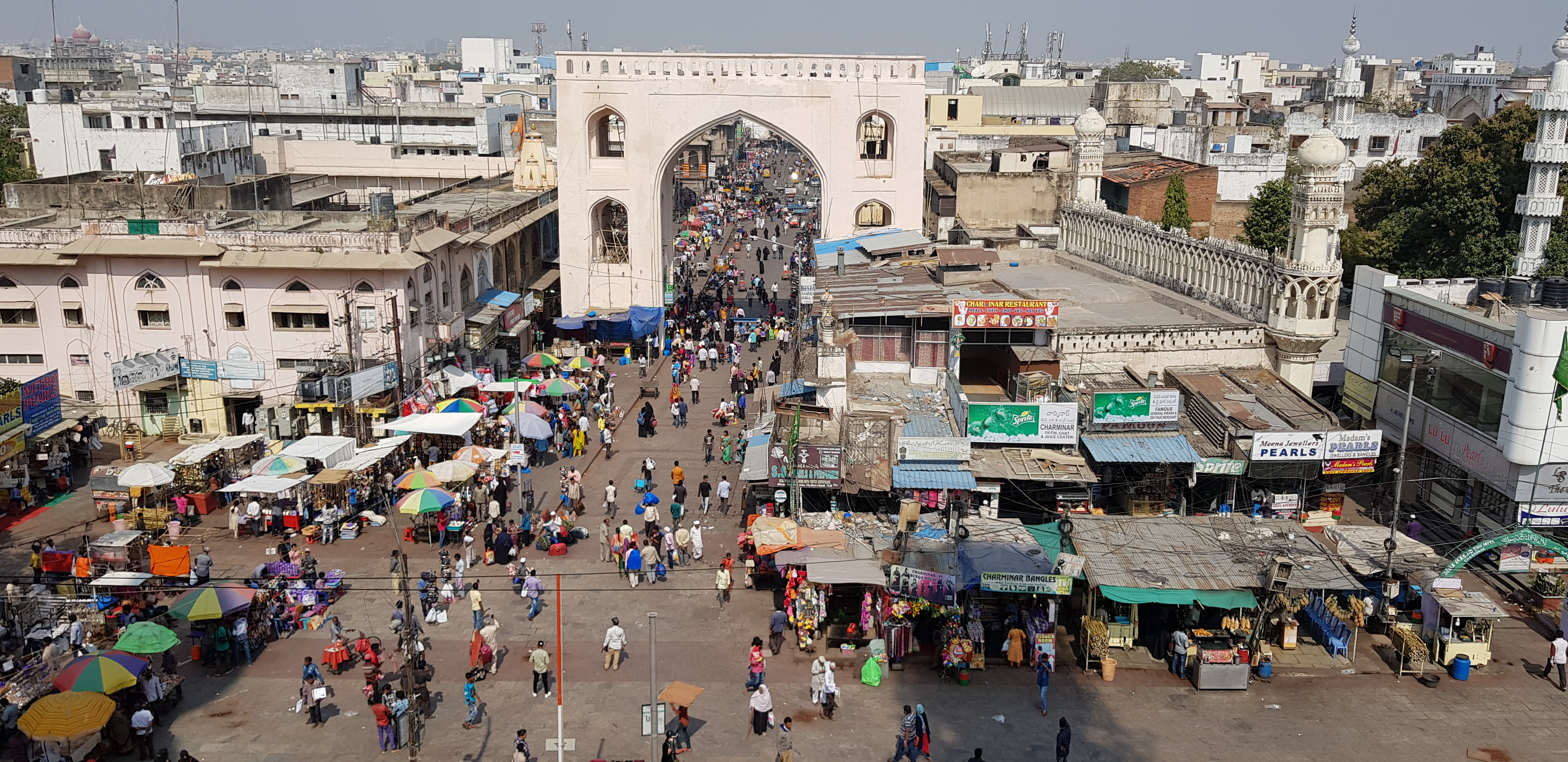
Char Kaman seen from the top of the Charminar

Arches in four directions of Charminar are known as Char Kaman. These were built along with the Charminar in the 16th century. These are the Kali Kaman, Machli Kaman, Seher-e-Batil ki Kaman and Charminar Kaman. At the centre of these arches is a fountain called the Gulzar Houz. The Char Kaman are in dire need of restoration, and protection from encroachments.

== Influences ==
In 2007, Hyderabadi Muslims living in Pakistan constructed a small-scaled quasi replica of the Charminar at the main crossing of the Bahadurabad neighbourhood in Karachi.

Lindt chocolatier Adelbert Boucher created a scaled model of the Charminar out of 50 kilograms of chocolate. The model, which required three days' labour, was on display at The Westin, Hyderabad, India on 25 and 26 September 2010.

The Charminar Express is an express train named after the Charminar, which runs between Hyderabad and Chennai.

Other appearances of Charminar

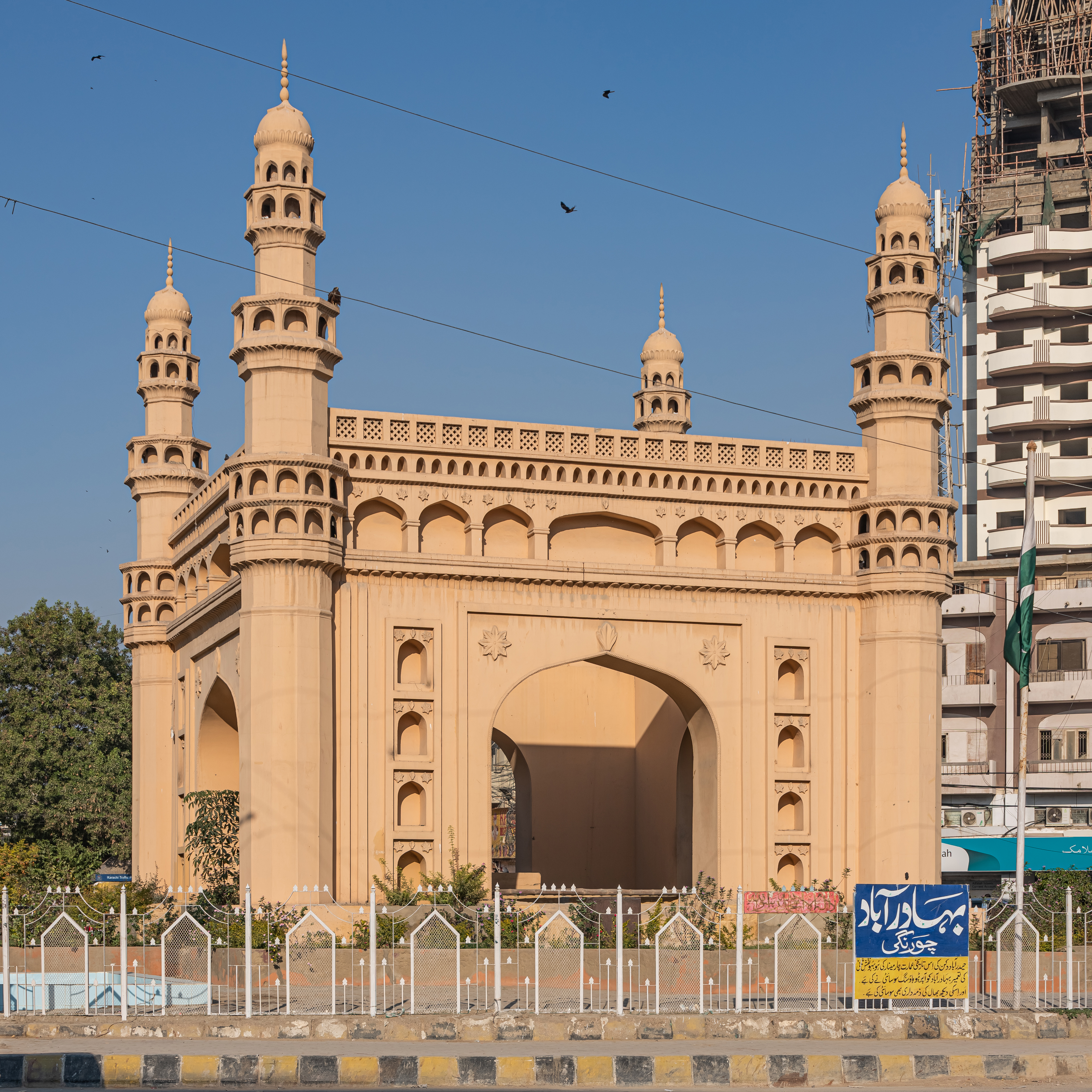
A replica of the Charminar built in the Bahadurabad, Karachi, Pakistan

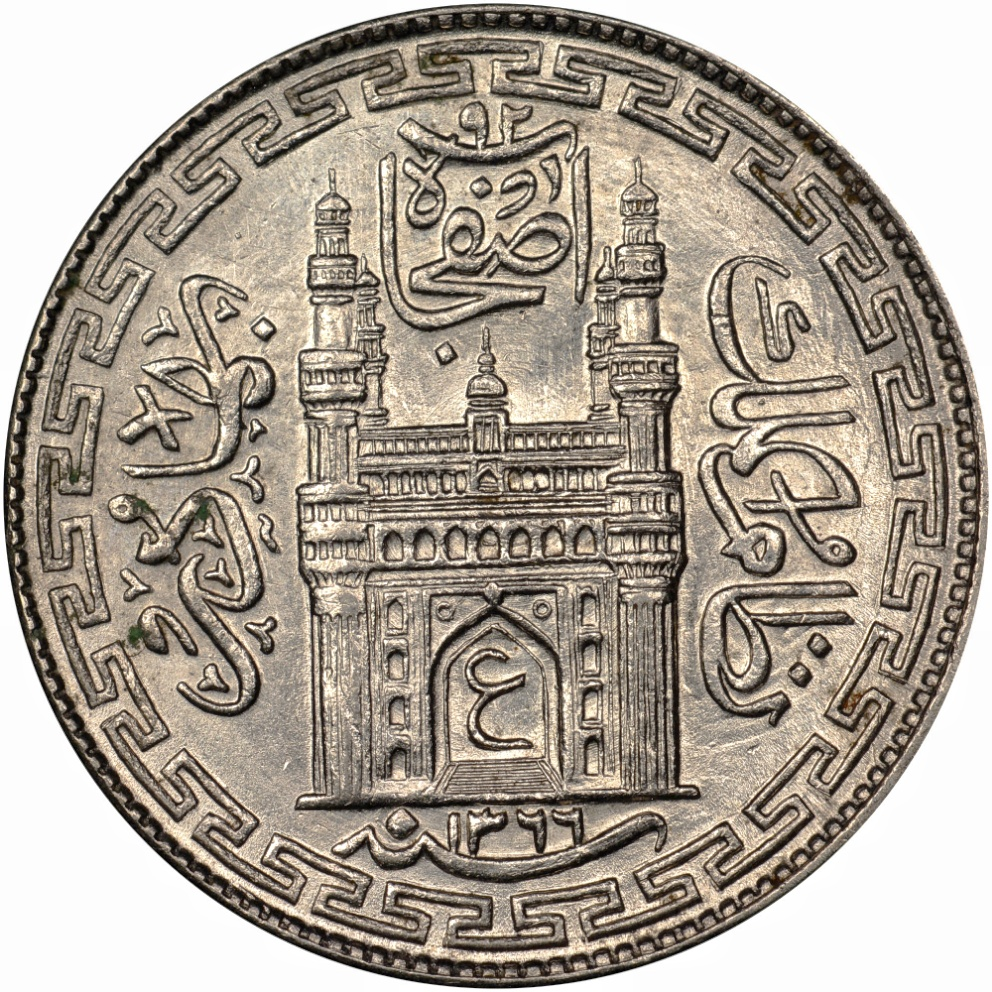
Silver one rupee coin from the princely state of Hyderabad, featuring the Charminar

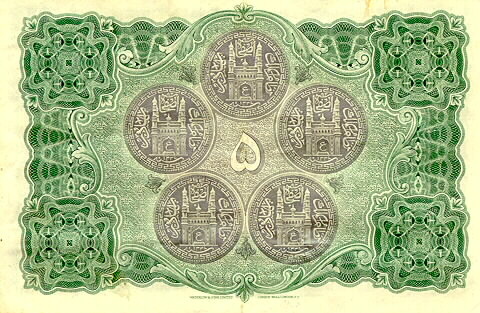
Five Hyderabadi Rupee note issued during the reign of Asaf Jah VII

The Charminar also appears on coins and banknotes of the defunct Hyderabadi Rupee, the currency of the erstwhile Hyderabad State.

As an icon of the city of Hyderabad as well as the Telangana State, the structure also appears on the Emblem of Telangana, along with the Kakatiya Kala Thoranam.

== Charminar Pedestrianisation Project (CPP) ==
The Charminar Pedestrianisation Project is an initiative aimed at transforming the area around the iconic Charminar monument in Hyderabad, India into a pedestrian-friendly zone. The project was proposed by the government of Telangana in 2016 and is part of a larger effort to improve the city's urban infrastructure. The Charminar is a historic monument that attracts millions of visitors each year, but the surrounding area is congested with traffic and is not conducive to walking. The Pedestrianisation Project seeks to address this issue by creating a car-free zone around the monument and improving the overall pedestrian experience.

The project involves the construction of wider sidewalks, pedestrian crossings, and improved lighting, as well as the installation of street furniture and landscaping to create a more attractive and welcoming environment for visitors. The plan also includes the development of a dedicated parking area for visitors to the Charminar, which will be located outside the pedestrian zone.

The project has been met with some controversy, as it involves the relocation of several street vendors and businesses that currently operate in the area. However, proponents of the project argue that the benefits of creating a more pedestrian-friendly environment around the Charminar will outweigh any short-term disruptions.

Overall, the Charminar Pedestrianisation Project represents an important effort to improve the urban infrastructure of Hyderabad and create a more attractive and accessible environment for visitors to one of the city's most iconic landmarks. Later during January 2017, the new Government of Telangana introduced a 14-member French Delegation to take over the project to assess the feasibility in developing the monument as an eco-friendly tourism and heritage destination. The team has inspected surrounding areas such as the Gulzar house, Makkah Masjid, Lad Bazar, and Sardar Mahal.

== UNESCO World Heritage Site tentative list ==
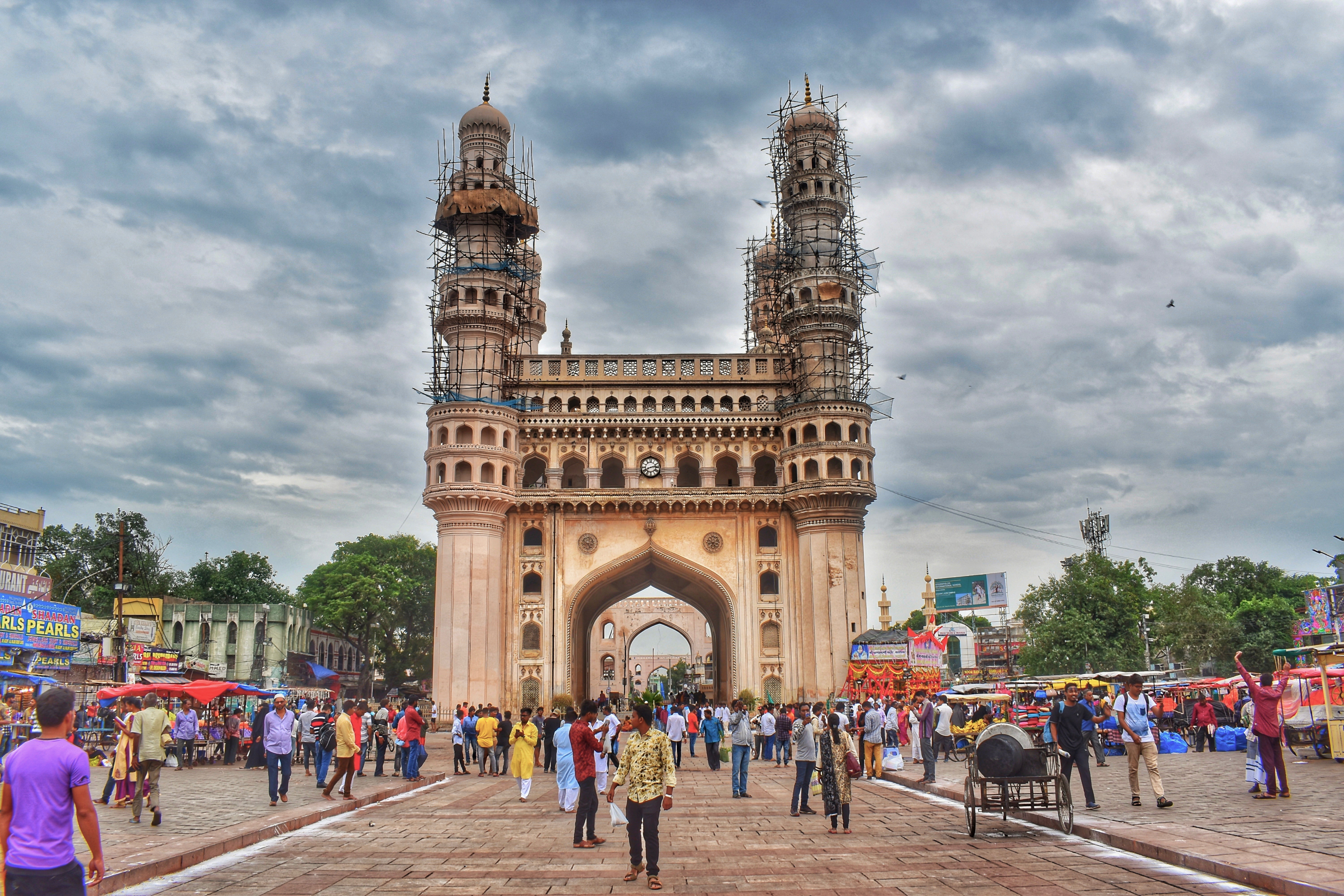
Charminar on a cloudy day

Charminar, along with the Qutb Shahi Monuments of Hyderabad: the Golconda Fort, and the Qutb Shahi Tombs, were included in the "tentative list" of UNESCO World Heritage Site. The monument was submitted by the Permanent Delegation of India to UNESCO on September 10, 2010.

== Temple structure ==
A temple by the name of Bhagyalakshmi Temple sprouted up at the base of Charminar in the 1960s. The Archaeological Survey of India—which manages the Charminar—has declared the temple structure as an unauthorised construction. The Hyderabad High Court has stopped any further expansion of the temple. While the origin of the temple is currently disputed, the current structure that houses the idol was erected in the 1960s. In 2012, The Hindu newspaper published an old photograph showing that the temple structure never existed. The Hindu also released a note asserting the authenticity of the photographs, and clearly stated that there was no temple structure in photos taken in 1957 and 1962. Additionally, it showed photos that provide evidence that the temple is a recent addition: a temple structure can be seen in photos taken in 1990 and 1994. Also, a temple is seen in a photograph taken in 1986, which is kept in the Aga Khan Visual Archive, MIT Libraries' collections, United States, but not in the earlier ones.

== See also ==
- Nizams of Hyderabad
- History of Hyderabad
- Kingdom of Hyderabad
- Tourist attractions in Hyderabad
- Hyderabad city
- Telangana State
