= Neknam Khan =

17th-century Iranian commander-in-chief of the Sultanate of Golconda

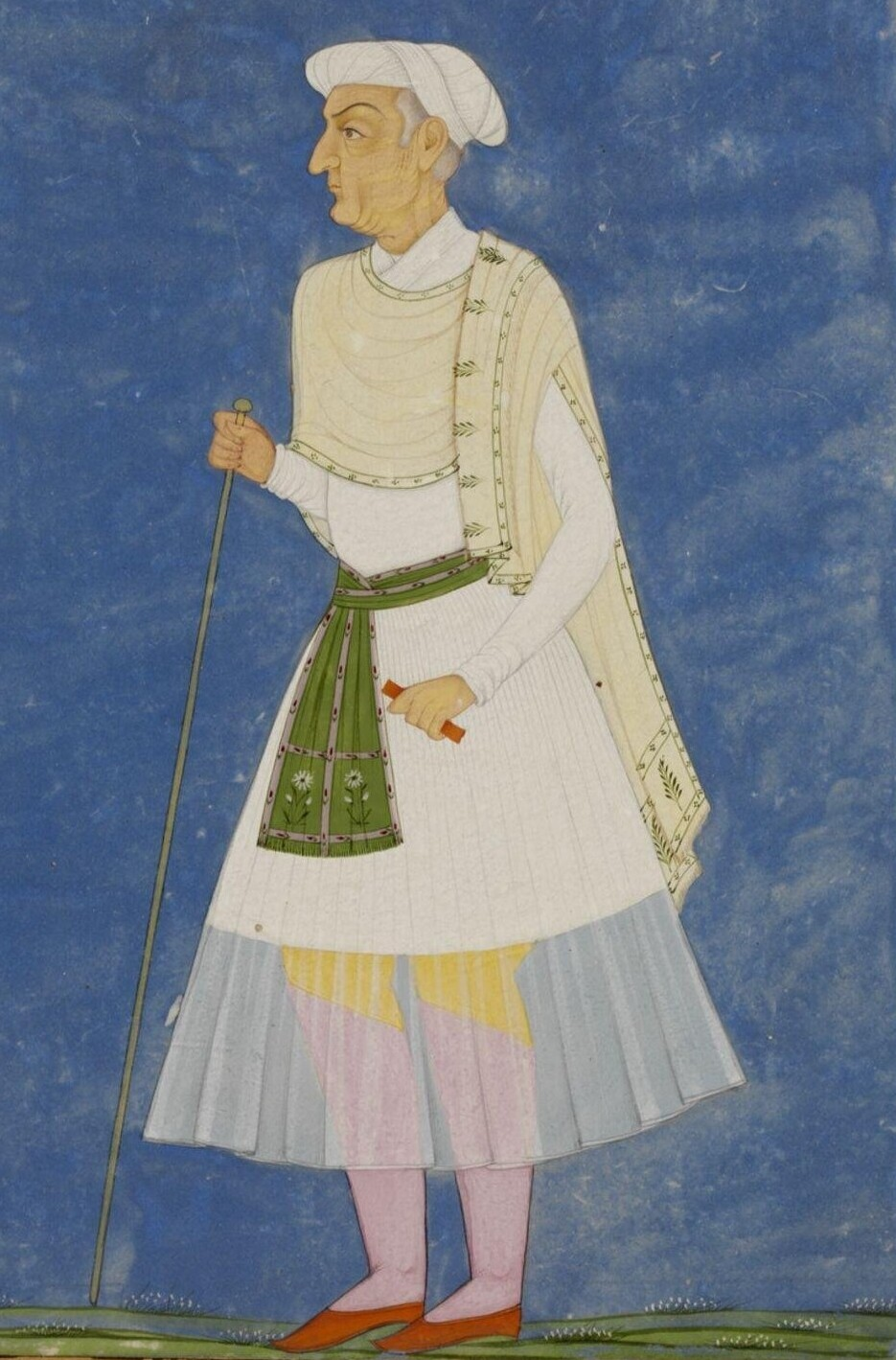
Portrait of Neknam Khan. Made in the Deccan, dated 1690

Neknam Khan (Persian: نک‌نام خان; born Reza Qoli Beg, died 29 March 1672) was the Iranian-born sipahsalar (commander-in-chief) of the Sultanate of Golconda. A native of Gilan or Mazandaran, he initially served in the court of the Mughal emperor Jahangir (r. 1605–1627) before moving to Golconda in 1634/35. There he worked under its ruler Abdullah Qutb Shah (r. 1626–1672), as well as briefly Mir Jumla II. He supported the Iranian theologian and historian Ali ibn Tayfur Bistami, who dedicated the Ganjnama dar hall-i-lughat-i-shahnama ("Treasure Book to Solve Words in the Book of Kings") to him. It was a dictionary for the outdated words used in the Persian epic Shahnameh ("Book of Kings").

== Sources ==
- Dayal, Subah (2020). "On Heroes and History: Responding to the Shahnama in the Deccan, 1500–1800". In Overton, Keelan (ed.). Iran and the Deccan: Persianate Art, Culture, and Talent in Circulation, 1400–1700. Indiana University Press. pp. 421–446. ISBN 978-0253048912.
- Overton, Keelan (2020). "Introduction to Iranian Mobilities and Persianate Mediations in the Deccan". In Overton, Keelan (ed.). Iran and the Deccan: Persianate Art, Culture, and Talent in Circulation, 1400–1700. Indiana University Press. pp. 3–76. ISBN 978-0253048912.
