= Emblem of Telangana =

State Emblem of India

- Armiger: Government of Telangana
- Adopted: 2 June 2014
- Crest: National Emblem of India
- Shield: Kakatiya Kala Thoranam, Charminar
- Supporters: Kakatiya Kala Thoranam; Charminar
- Use: As State Emblem

The Emblem of Telangana is the state emblem of Telangana in South India. The arms has the Kakatiya Kala Thoranam in the middle, and the Charminar inside it and bordered in green.

== Design ==
The emblem is a circular seal consisting of the Kakatiya Kala Thoranam and Charminar with the Sarnath Lion Capital above. It has "Telangana Prabhutvamu" in Telugu."Government of Telangana" in English and "Telangana Sarkar" in Urdu and Satyameva Jayate is written in Sanskrit.

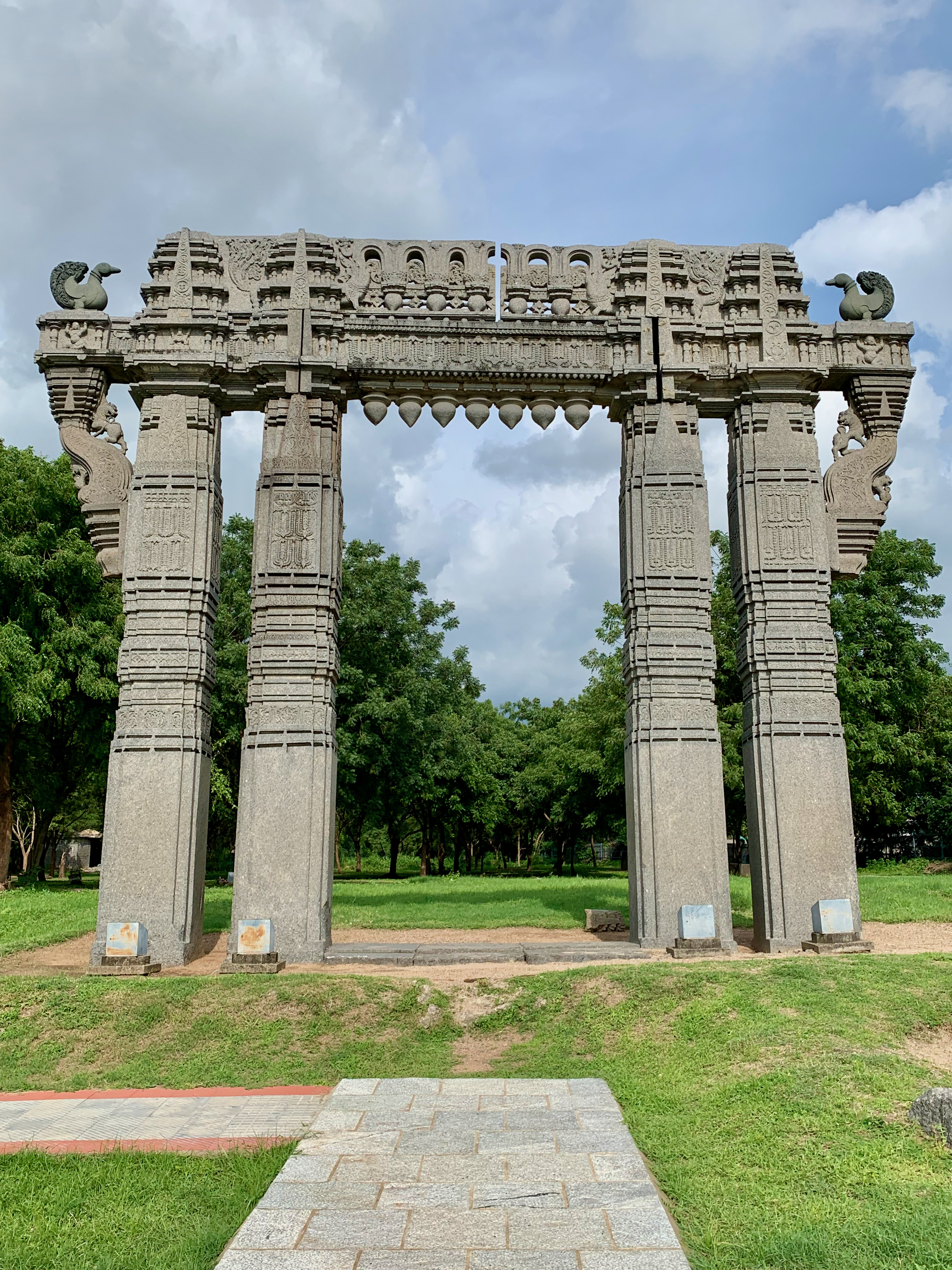
Kakatiya Kala Thoranam

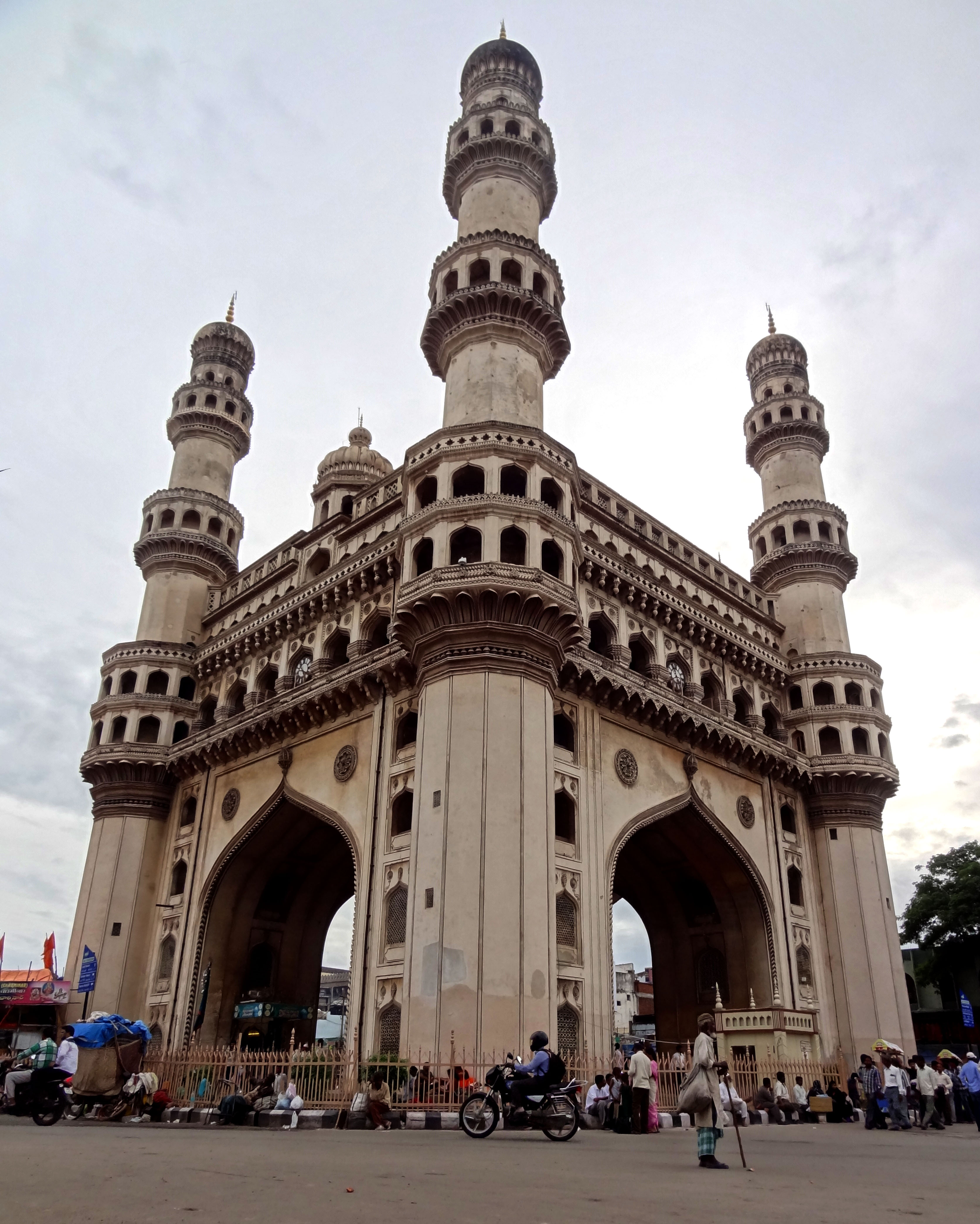
Charminar

== History ==
The emblem was designed by painter, Laxman Aelay. It was adopted on 2 June 2014 after the newly formed government headed by K. Chandrashekar Rao adopted it. It was the first file to be signed by him after swearing in. Initially, Charminar was not included.

Initially the national motto was written below the emblem. Naresh Kadyan, Abhishek Kadyan, and Sukanya Kadyan complained to the government about the alleged insult of the Emblem without the motto. The Sarnath Lion Capital, when used in heraldry, is required to have the words Satyameva Jayate underneath it, as per the State Emblem of India (Prohibition of Improver Use) Act, 2005, which the new logo violated when it was first released. The emblem was corrected with an amendment approved by the Government of Telangana on 25 June 2014 made by Laxman Aelay, by moving the Satyameva Jayate below the Sarnath Lion Capital, complying with the national norm.

=== Historic emblems ===
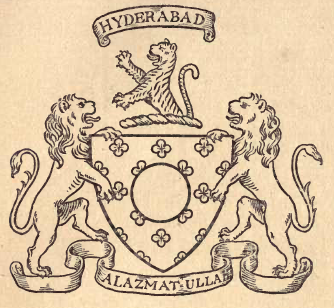
Coat of arms of Nizam of Hyderabad (1869–1911)

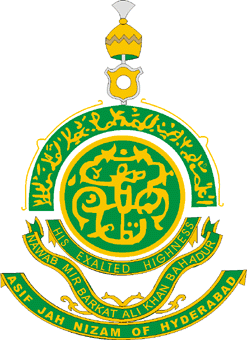
Coat of arms of Nizam of Hyderabad (1911–1947)

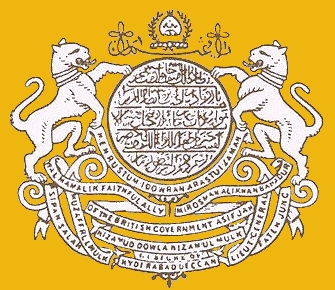
Coat of arms of Nizam of Hyderabad (1947–1948)

Emblem of Hyderabad State (1947–1948)

Emblem of Hyderabad State (1948–1956)

Emblem of Undivided Andhra Pradesh (1956–2014)

== Government banner ==
The Government of Telangana can be represented by a banner displaying the emblem of the state on a white field.

Banner from 1956 to 2014

== See also ==
- National Emblem of India
- List of Indian state emblems
