= Gulzar Houz =

Neighbourhood & fountain in Hyderabad, Telangana, India

- Year: 1592; 434 years ago
- Type: Fountain
- Dimensions: 312 m (1,024 ft)
- Location: Hyderabad, Telangana, India; 17°21′48″N 78°28′30″E
- Owner: Government of Telangana

Gulzar Houz is a historical fountain located in Hyderabad, Telangana, India. It is located near the Charminar monument. The fountain is in the middle of the road between Charminar and Madina building.

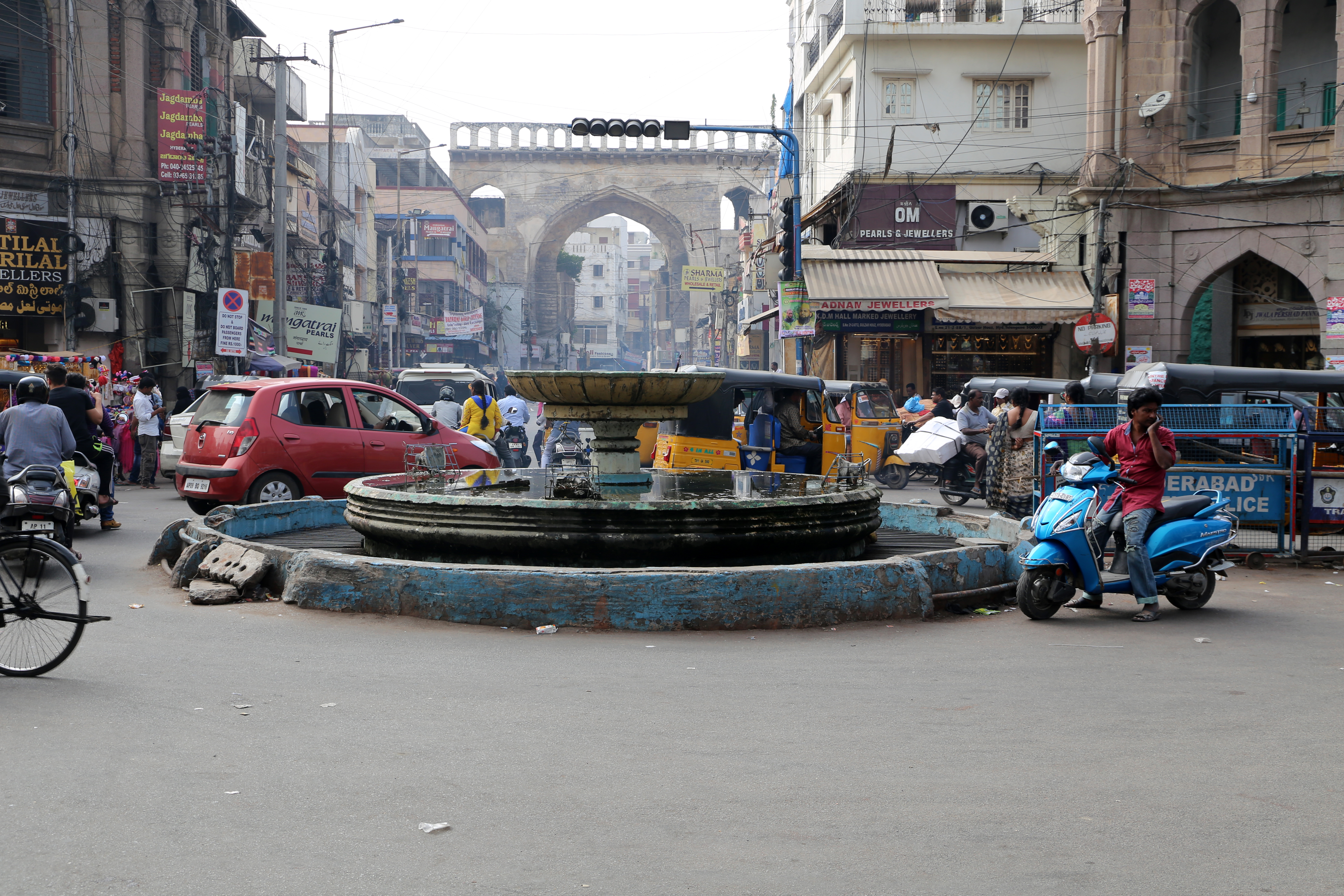
Gulzar Houz, before restoration

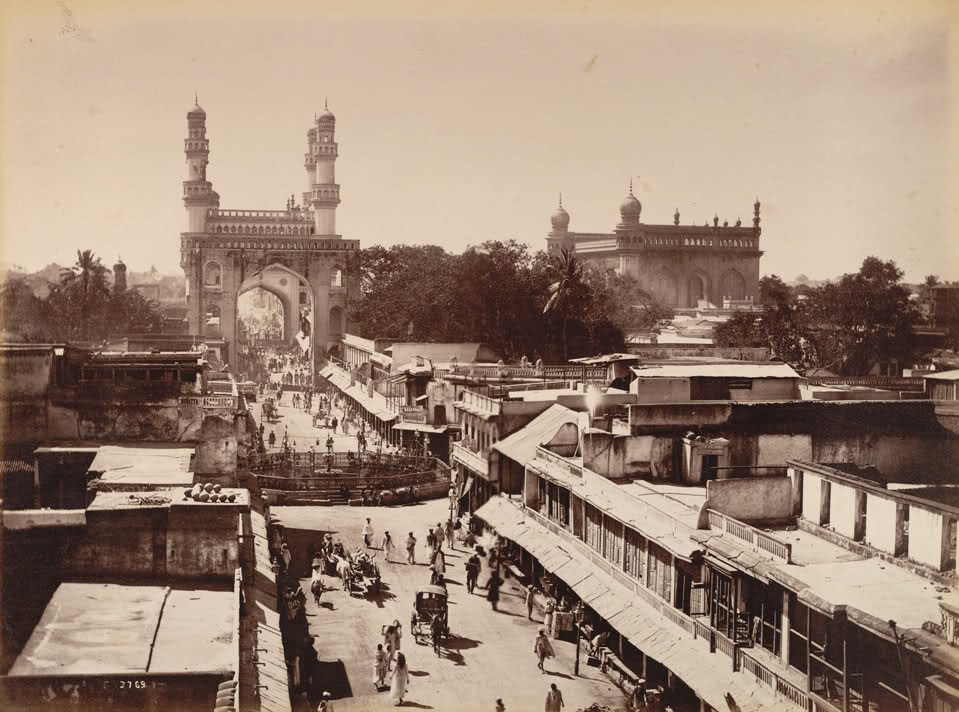
Gulzar Houz, circa 1880

The area between the four arches of Charkaman was a vast square called Jilu Khana or the Guard's Square. In the centre of the square was the Char-Su-Ka-Hauz (the cistern of four cardinal points). This was later known as "Suka-Hauz" and now Gulzar Houz. This was built 350 feet equidistant from the four kamaans surrounding it. Initially it was 12 sided then it turned octagonal and today it looks almost circular. It was an octagonal shaped water reservoir made for quenching the thirst of the Nizam's soldiers. At that time, there were four streams flowing from this fountain, dividing each of the Radial roads into two halves. It was constructed by Mir Momin Astarabadi, the first prime minister under Mohammed Quli Qutub Shah (5th Sultan of Qutb shahi dynasty) around 400 years ago.

It was refurbished and reopened in the year 2023.

== Incidents ==
On 18 May 2025, a devastating fire occurred in a century-old building near Gulzar Houz in Hyderabad. The blaze resulted in the deaths of 17 members of a single family, including eight children. The fire reportedly started around 4:45 AM IST in the ground-floor pearl shop, likely due to a short circuit in the display cabinet's wiring. This led to an explosion in the air-conditioner's compressor, causing the fire to spread rapidly through the building, which featured wooden interiors and lacked proper ventilation. Family members attempted to extinguish the fire themselves for approximately 45 minutes before contacting emergency services at around 6:00 AM. The delay in reporting the fire contributed to the severity of the incident.
