= M. A. Nayeem =

Indian historian (1938–2022)

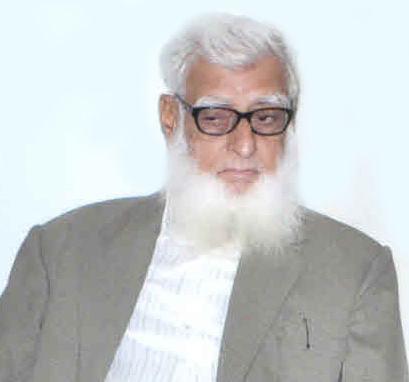
- Born: 1938
- Died: 14 June 2022 (aged 83–84)

Academic background
- Education: Osmania University; Aligarh Muslim University; Pune University
- Thesis: External Relations of the Bijapur Kingdom 1489 - 1686 A.D. ( A Study in Diplomatic History)
- Doctoral advisor: AR Kulkarni

Muhammad Abdul Nayeem (1938 – 13 June 2022) was an Indian historian, known for his work on the history of the Deccan Sultanates and Hyderabad.

== Early life and education ==
Nayeem graduated from Osmania University and completed his master's from Aligarh Muslim University. He went on to obtain a PhD from Pune University.

== Career ==
In 1982, Nayeem moved to Saudi Arabia, where he worked at the King Saud University. He moved back to Hyderabad in 2000.

== Personal life ==
He was married to Fouzia Nayeem, who was a doctor.

== list of works ==
- External Relations of the Bijapur Kingdom 1489- 1686 A.D., 1974
- The Heritage of the Qutb Shahis of Golconda and Hyderabad (2006)
- The Heritage of the Bahmanis & the Baridis of the Deccan (1347-1538-1619 A.D) (2012)
- The Heritage of the Adil Shahis of Bijapur, 2008
- Safavid Iran and the Deccan Sultanates, 2017
- Farmans and Sanads of the Deccan Sultans 1408-1687 A.D., 1980
- Mughal Documents: Catalogue of Aurangzeb’s Reign Part 1 and 2, 1980–81
- Mughal Administration of Deccan under Nizamul Mulk Asaf Jah, 1720-48 A.D., 1985
- The History of Gardens and Garden Culture in the Deccan (with Daud Ali, Omar Khalidi), 2007
- History of Modern Deccan 1720-1948 Vol.1 Political and Administrative Aspects (with A.R.Kulkarni), 2000
- History of Modern Deccan 1720-1948 Vol.2 Economic and Cultural Aspects, 2009
- Studies in History of the Deccan Medieval and Modern: Professor A.R.Kulkarni Felicitation Volume (with Aniruddha Ray, K.S.Mathew), 2002
- Studies in the Foreign Relations of India Ancient time to 1947: Prof. H.K.Sherwani Felicitation Volume (with P.M.Joshi), 1974
- Medieval Deccan History: commemoration Volume in Honor of P.M.Joshi (with A.R.Kulkarni, T.R.deSouza)
- Temples of Andhra Pradesh: History, Art and Architecture (with Pidatala Sitapati), 2018
- The Splendor of Hyderabad: The Last Phase of an Oriental Culture, 1591-1948 A.D., 2002
- The Philatelic and Postal History of Hyderabad: History of Postal administration in Hyderabad, 1970
- The Philatelic and Postal History of Hyderabad: Postal Markings, 1967
- Evolution of Postal Communications and Administration in the Deccan, from 1294 A.D. to the Formation of Hyderabad State in 1724 A.D., 1968
- Hyderabad philatelic History, 1980
- Miniature Paintings of Nizam Ali Khan Asaf Jah II & Others, 2014

The Salar Jungs (with Dharmendra Prasad), 1986

- Nawab Imadul Mulk, 1979
- The Royal Palaces of the Nizams (2009)
- Mir Osman Ali Khan Asaf Jah VII Nizam of Hyderabad and his contributions, 2018
- The Sultanate of Oman, 1990
- Prehistory and Protohistory of the Arabian Peninsula: Qatar (1990)
- Prehistory and Proto history of the Arabian Peninsula: The United Arab Emirates, 1990
- Prehistory and Protohistory of the Arabian Peninsula: Bahrain, 1990
- Prehistory and Proto history of the Arabian Peninsula: Oman, 1990
- The Rock Art of Arabia: Saudi Arabia, Oman, Qatar, the Emirates and Yemen (2000)
- Origin of Ancient Writing in Arabia and New Scripts from Oman an Introduction to South Semitic Epigraphy and Paleography, 2001
