= Kakatiya Kala Thoranam =

Coordinates: 17.956286°N 79.616053°E

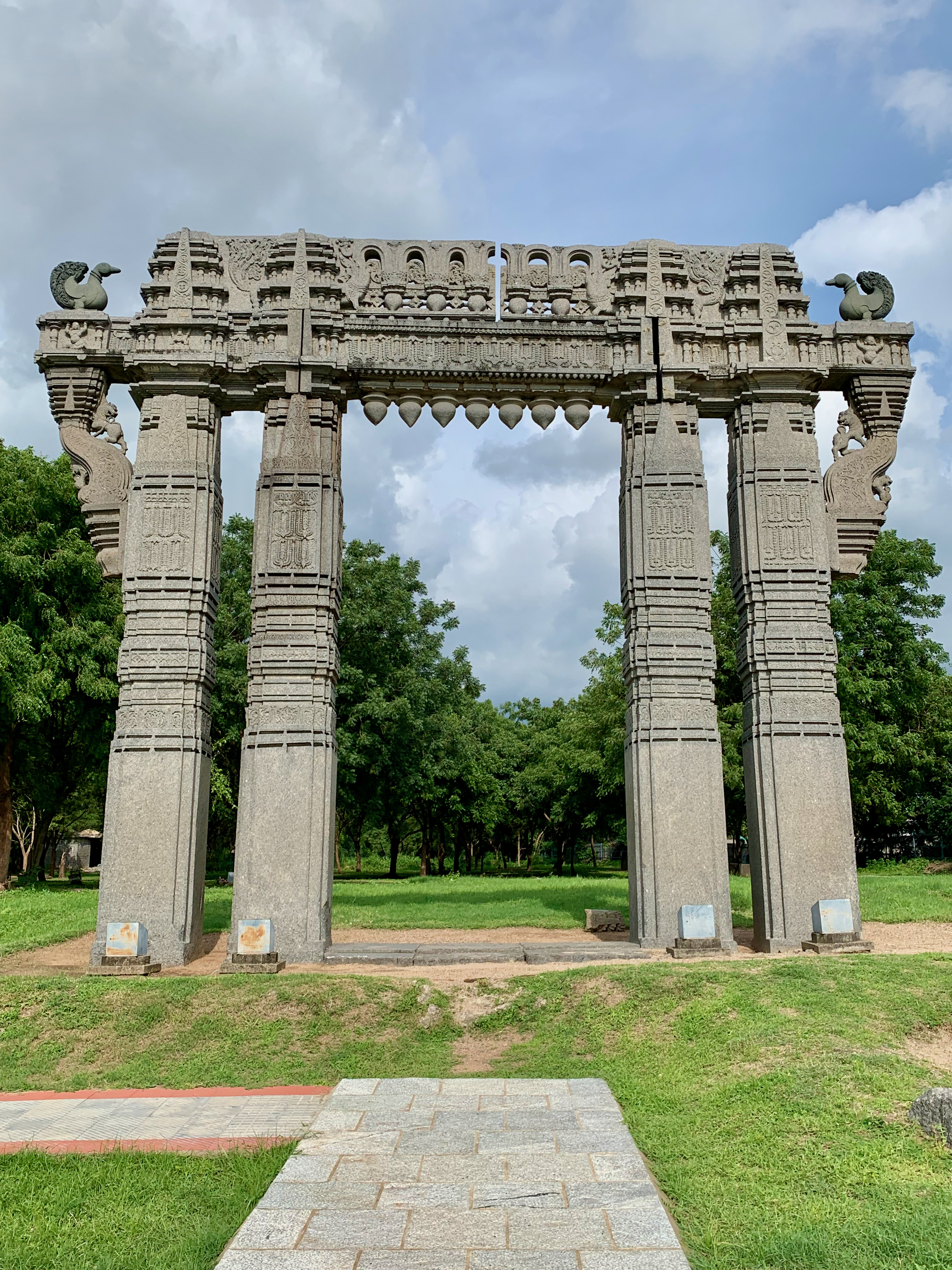
- Interactive map of the Kakatiya Kala Thoranam area

General information
- Type: Arch
- Location: Warangal, Telangana, India
- Completed: 1200; 826 years ago

Kakatiya Kala Thoranam (also called Warangal Gate) is a historical arch in the Warangal district, of the Indian state of Telangana. The Warangal Fort has four ornamental gates which originally formed the gates to the ruins of the great Shiva temple which are known as Kakatiya Kala Thoranam or Warangal Gates. The architectural feature of these historical arches of the Warangal Fort has been adopted as the symbol of the Kakatiya Dynasty and has been officially incorporated as the Emblem of Telangana for the state of Telangana.

The arch was built around 12th century during the rule of the Kakatiya dynasty. The Monument was included in the "tentative list" of UNESCO World Heritage Site. The Monument was submitted by the Permanent Delegation of India to UNESCO on 10/09/2010.

== History ==
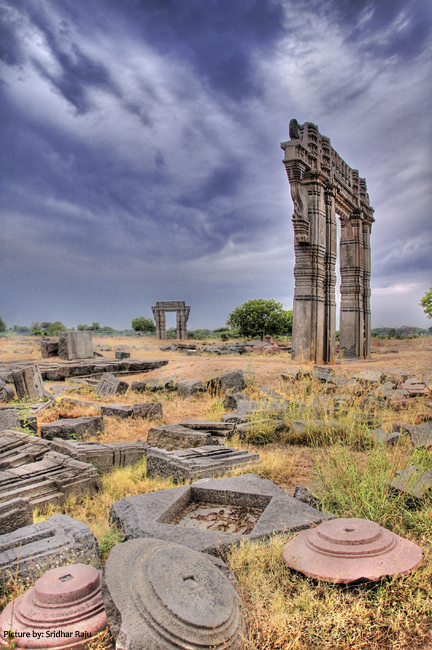
Kakatiya Kala Thoranam (Warangal Gate) and Ruins

The Kakatiya Kala Thoranam, or arch, is an extensive ornamented stone sculpture; reflective of four identical gates in the Warangal Fort, which was part of the great Swayambhusiva temple of Shiva in the fort built by Ganapati-deva (1199-1262) during the 12th century. His daughter Rudrama Devi and Pratap Rudra II of the Kakatiya Dynasty added more fortifications to the fort which was laid in three concentric circles. The four gateways (char kaman) were part of the temple which was destroyed by the Muslim invader Jauna Khan during the 1323 invasion, as a part of their policy followed after their victories over territories, to desecrate Hindu temples. The great temple of which the gates were integral is said to be comparable to the size and splendor of the Rudra Mahalaya Temple at Siddhpur in Gujarat.

== Features ==
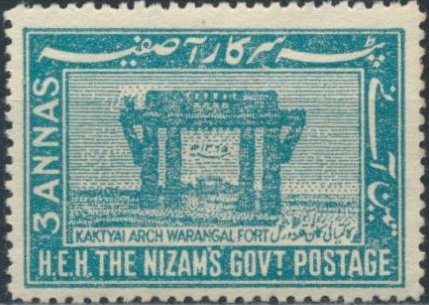
The arch depicted on a stamp

A depiction of the arch forms the main symbol in the Emblem of Telangana for the state of Telangana. This logo or emblem, in English, Telugu and Urdu is portrayed with a combination of green and gold, representing "Bangaru Telangana" (meaning: "Golden Telangana"). Also inscribed on the logo are the names of the Government of Telangana in English, and as "Telangana Prabhutvam" in Telugu and as "Telangana Sarkar" in Urdu. At the base of the logo there is an inscription in Sanskrit which says "Satyameva Jayate" (meaning: Truth shall triumph).

The central part of the fort, identified as the archaeological zone, contains the ruins of the great Swayambhusiva temple, now seen with only the free-standing "Entrance Portals", or gates on the four sides, all being similar in design. Each gate has twin pillars with angled brackets over which lies the huge lintel; the height of this gate being 10 metres (33 ft). The gates have extensive intricate carvings of "lotus buds, looped garlands, mythical animals, and birds with foliated tails". They do not depict any religious symbols, said to be the reason for its preserved condition for not being destroyed by Muslim invaders. The gates at the northern and southern ends are 480 feet (150 m) apart. The eastern and western gates are at a distance of 433 feet (132 m) apart.

== Replicas ==
A replica of the gateway has been installed at Narsingi.

== Bibliography ==
- Cousens, Henry (1900). Lists of antiquarian remains in His Highness the Nizam's territories. Office of the superintendent of government printing, India.
- Eaton, Richard M. (17 November 2005). A Social History of the Deccan, 1300-1761: Eight Indian Lives. Cambridge University Press. ISBN 978-0-521-25484-7.
- Michell, George (1 May 2013). Southern India: A Guide to Monuments Sites & Museums. Roli Books Private Limited. ISBN 978-81-7436-903-1.
- Prasādarāvu, Calasāni (1989). Kakatiya Sculpture: A Critical Study of the Sculptural and Artistic Relics and Monuments of Telangana During the Years 1,000 to 1,323 A.D. Under the Kakatiya Rulers. Rekha.
- Singh, Sarina (2007). South India. Lonely Planet. ISBN 978-1-74104-704-2.
