= Pucca housing =

Type of permanent housing in South Asia

Pucca housing (or pukka or pacca) refers to dwellings that are designed to be solid and permanent. This term is applied to housing in South Asia built of substantial material such as stone, brick, cement, concrete, or timber.

The term pucca means "solid" and "permanent", from Hindustani पक्का/پکّا pakkā, lit. '"ripe, cooked, experienced"'. It is contrasted with kutcha housing (कच्जा/کچّا kaččā lit. '"unripe, raw, inexperienced"'), referring to buildings of flimsy construction. Pucca homes are typically made of concrete, stone, clay tiles and/or metal, in contrast to older homes made of mud and organic material. These building methods are more costly and labor-intensive than the more traditional building methods.

In India, there is currently a large-scale effort to build pucca houses for people. As of 10th June 2024, under the Pradhan Mantri Awas Yojana-Urban (PMAY-U), 83.67 lakh (8,367,000) pucca houses have been completed out of the total of 1.18 Crore (11,800,000) houses sanctioned for construction.

Pucca houses are sometimes built to replace homes damaged by natural disasters. The permanency of pucca materials and techniques inevitably makes it less easy to adjust the house to the needs and habits of the occupants, and the relationship between house and occupants becomes more rigid, more fixed.
