= A Guide to the Heritage of Hyderabad =

A Guide to the Heritage of Hyderabad: The Natural and the Built
- Author: Madhu Vottery
- Language: English
- Genre: History
- Publication date: 2010
- Publication place: India
- Media type: Print (Hardback & Paperback)
- Pages: 270 pp (US hardback edition)
- ISBN: 978-81-291-1656-7

A Guide to the Heritage of Hyderabad: The Natural and the Built is a book on the heritage structures and buildings located in Hyderabad, Telangana, India. It is written by Madhu Vottery. The book contains all the heritage structures and building like the Charminar, Golconda, Qutb Shahi Tombs, Chowmahalla Palace etc.
