= Mohammed Adil Shah of Bijapur =

Sultan of Bijapur from 1627 to 1656

Mohammed Adil Shah
- Sultan; Shah
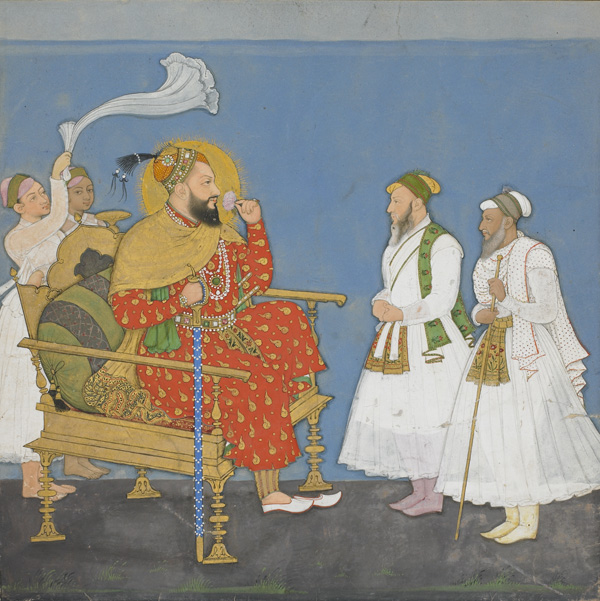
- Muhammad Adil Shah with courtiers and attendants

7th Sultan of Bijapur
- Reign: 12 September 1627 – 4 November 1656
- Predecessor: Ibrahim Adil Shah II
- Successor: Ali Adil Shah II
- Born: 1612; Bijapur
- Died: 4 November 1656 (aged 43–44); Bijapur
- Burial: Gol Gumbaz
- Spouse: Taj Jahan Begum (daughter of Abdur Rahman Quadri); Khadija Sultana (daughter of Sultan Muhammad Qutb Shah}; Uroos Begum (daughter of Nawab Mustafa Khan also known as Khan Baba)
- Issue: Ali Adil Shah II
Names
- Mohammed Adil Shah Ghazi
- Dynasty: Adil Shahi Empire
- Father: Ibrahim Adil Shah II
- Mother: Taaj Sultana or Badi Sahiba
- Religion: Sunni Islam

Mohammed Adil Shah (1612 – 4 November 1656) was the seventh sultan of Bijapur, ascending the throne in 1627. During his reign, he assisted the Mughals with their campaigns against the Ahmednagar Sultanate and signed a peace treaty with them in 1636. He died in 1656 and was buried in the Gol Gumbaz.

== Rule ==
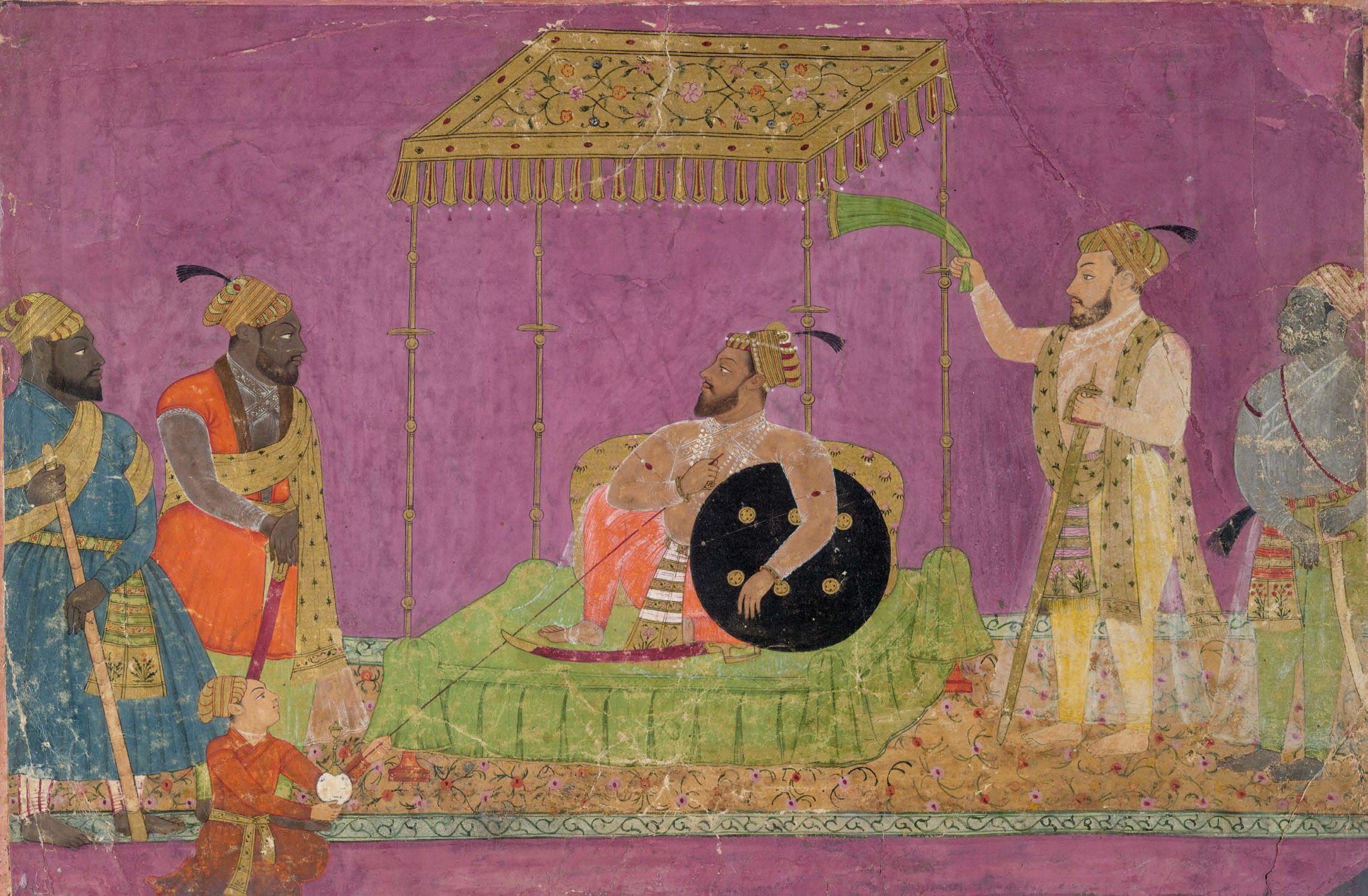
Sultan Muhammad Adil Shah of Bijapur and African courtiers, ca, 1640

Although Darvesh Padshah was Ibrahim's eldest son, Mohammed Adil Shah was raised to the throne in 1627 on his father's death, at the age of fifteen.

Mohammed Adil Shah of Bijapur partnered with the Mughals in their conquest of Ahmednagar. Mohammed maintained friendly relations with Shah Jahan and made a peace treaty of 1636, after the extinction of Ahmednagar. By a firman of Shah Jahan, he got assurances for the end of Mughal aggression against Bijapur and due to his good relations with the Mughals, Shah Jahan formally recognized Muhammad's sovereignty and bestowed upon him the title of Shah in 1648, the only ruler of Bijapur to receive such recognition from the Mughals.

The Treaty of 1636 with the Mughals sealed the expansion of Bijapur in the north. So, Mohammed Adil Shah extended his dominations westwards into Konkan, Pune, Dhabul, southwards into Mysore, and eastwards into Karnataka, present south Andhra Pradesh and Tamil Nadu. During his reign, the kingdom attained its greatest extent, power and magnificence, and his dominions stretched from the Arabian Sea to the Bay of Bengal.

Besides territorial expansions, Bijapur also attained peace and prosperity during Mohammed's reign. His kingdom yielded an annual revenue of seven crore eighty four lakh rupees, besides the five and half crores of tributes that were from vassal rulers and zamindars. Cultural activities like poetry, painting and architecture also received a great impetus. Mohammed Adil Shah did his best to emulate the glorious traditions left to him by his versatile father. Diffusion of general education and religious teachings were one of his chief concerns, and he did his utmost to improve the socio-economic and educational standards of the people.

Mohammed continued his father's patronage of the arts, though on a lesser scale. He introduced fresco paintings and portraits, the examples of which are the walls of Asar Mahal, pavilion at Kumatgi and Sat Manzil.

== The Marathas' insurgency ==
Mohammed Adil Shah along with Golconda sultan was responsible for dissolution of already decaying Vijayanagara Empire. This made him the most powerful ruler of Deccan region for a while. But as fate would always have its turn, Marathas inspired by Vijayanagar's history of valour launched a series of battles under the leadership of Shivaji and started capturing Bijapur territories during very same Muhamad's reign.Muhammed failed to check the rise of Marathas to independence and finally large part of Deccan region came under Maratha influence with defeat of Bijapur Sultanate.

== Death ==
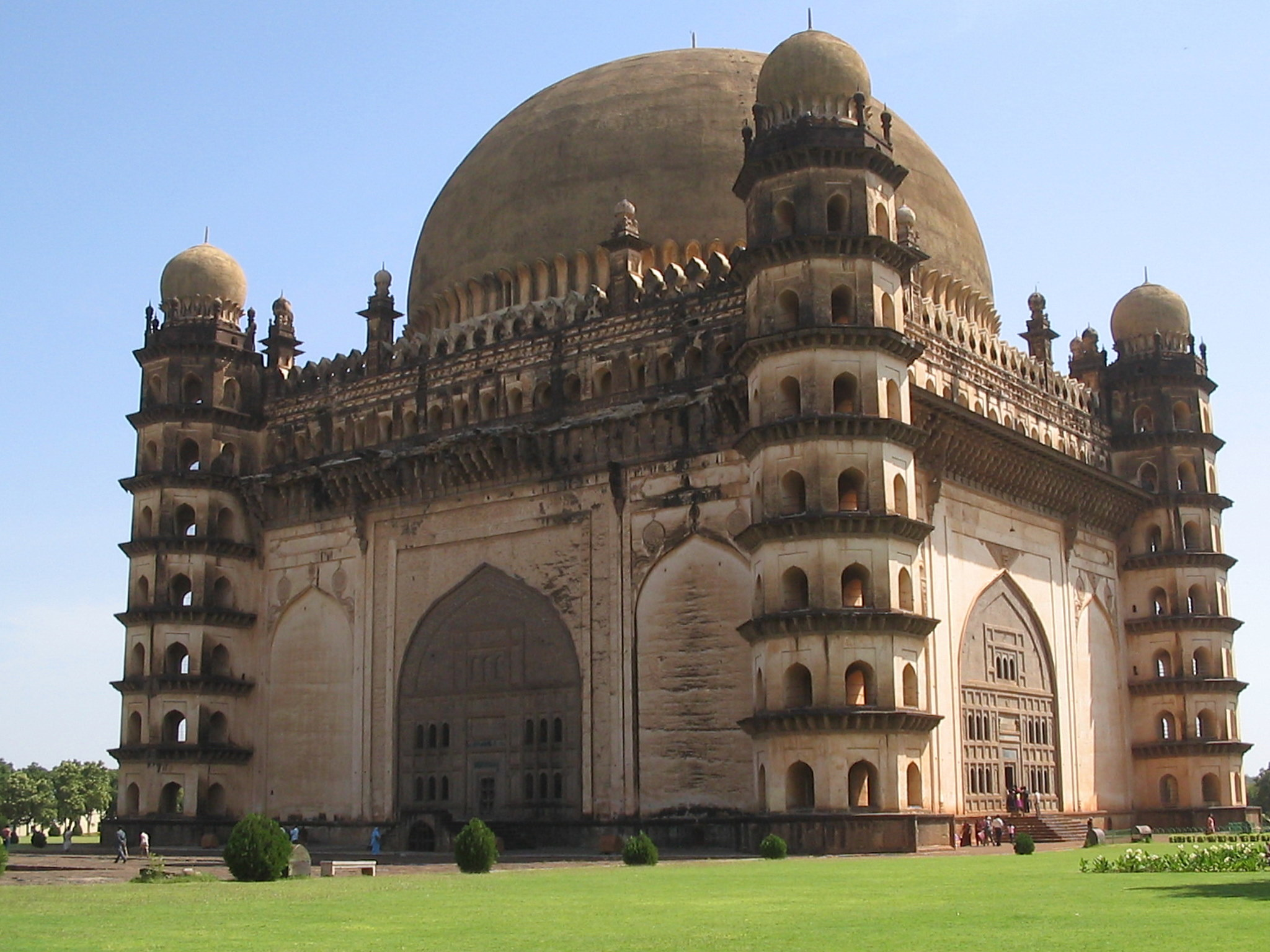
Gol Gumbaz, the tomb of Adil Shah. The dome of Gol Gumbaz is the second largest in the world

After an extended illness, Mohammad died and was succeeded by his son Ali Adil Shah II.

== Tomb ==
He was buried in the Gol Gumbaz, near the tomb of his spiritual teacher Hashim Peer Dastagir. Hashim Peer arrived in Bijapur at the rule of Ibrahim Adil Shah II. Hashimpeer influenced the rulers of Bijapur to give up their un-Islamic and heretic practices. Gol Gumbaz, located near the shrine of Hashimpeer, owes its completion to the 10 years of life that Hashimpeer granted to his disciple Adil Shah.

The dome of the Gol Gumbaz is the second largest in the world, 44 metres (144 ft) in diameter. The Gol Gumbaz complex includes a mosque, a Naqqar Khana (a hall for the trumpeters, now it is used as museum) and the ruins of guest houses.

== Popular culture ==
=== Films and television ===
- In the 2008-2009 Indian historical TV serial Raja Shivchhatrapati, he is portrayed by Milind Safai.
- In the 2011-2012 Indian historical TV serial Veer Shivaji, he is portrayed by Alihassan Turabi.
- In the 2026 Indian Marathi-language historical film Raja Shivaji, he is portrayed by Amole Gupte.

== See also ==
- Adil Shahi–Portuguese conflicts

| Preceded by Ibrahim Adil Shah II | Adil Shahi Rulers of Bijapur; 1627–1656 | Succeeded by Ali Adil Shah II |
