= Qutb Shahi tombs =

Historical Islamic tomb in Hyderabad, Telangana, India

Qutub Shahi tombs
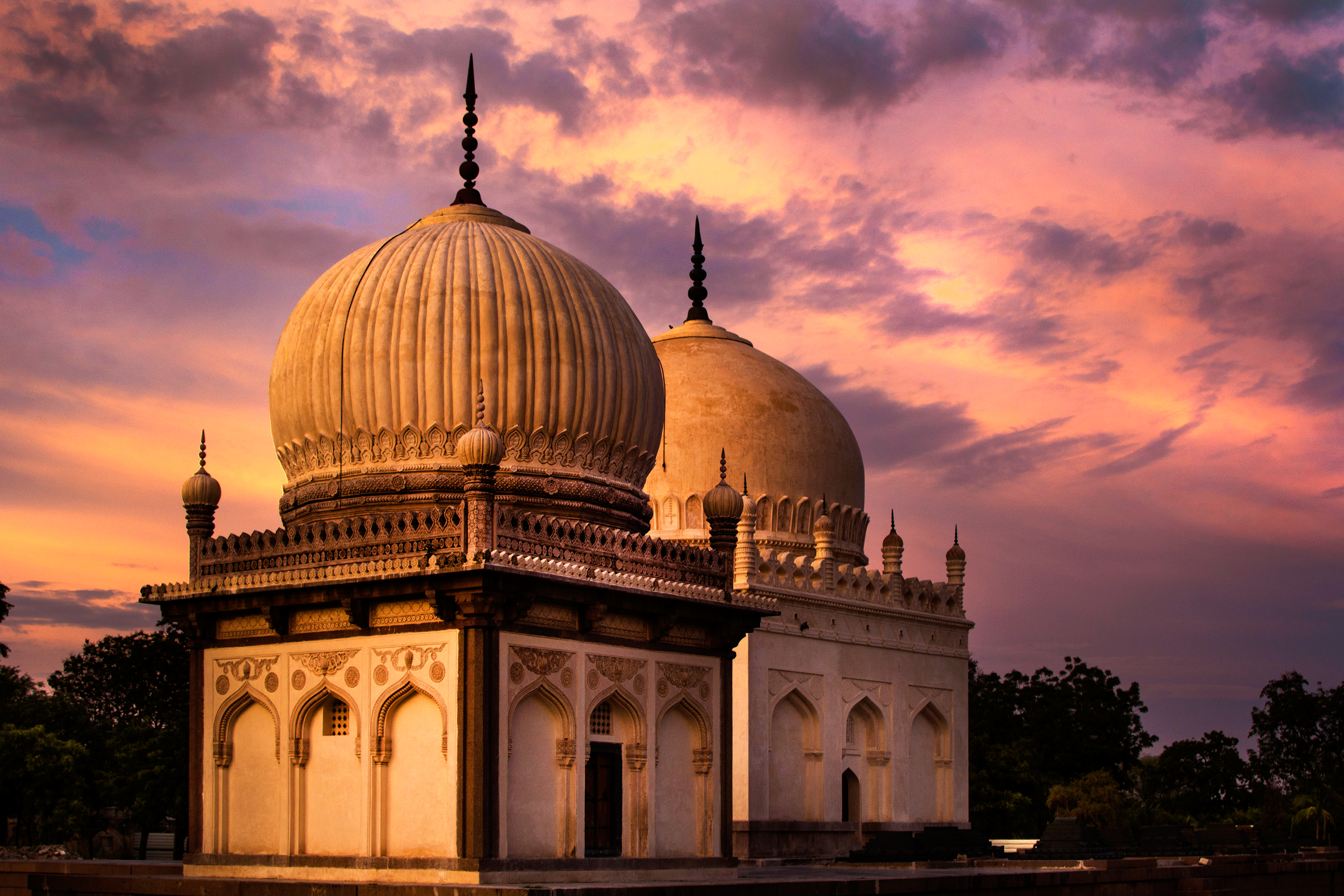
- Tombs of Subhan Quli (front) and Sultan Quli (rear)

- Location of the tombs in Hyderabad
- 17°23′42″N 78°23′46″E
- Type: Islamic Necropolis
- Location: Hyderabad, Hyderabad District, Telangana, India
- Nearest city: Golconda Fort

History
- Founded: 1543 CE
- Founder: Sultan Quli Qutb-ul-Mulk
- Built: 16th and 17th centuries
- Built for: Qutub Shahi dynasty

Site notes
- Architectural styles: Indo-Islamic; Qutb Shahi
- Restored: 2013–2019
- Restored by: Telangana State Archaeology and Museums Department, Aga Khan Trust for Culture

Monument of National Importance
- Official name: Qutub Shahi tombs
- Part of: Golkonda Fort, Fortifications
- Reference no.: N-AP-79

The Qutub Shahi tombs are a series of Islamic tombs and mosques built by the various kings of the Qutub Shahi dynasty, located in the Ibrahim Bagh (garden precinct), close to the famous Golconda Fort in Hyderabad, in the Hyderabad district of the state of Telangana, India.

A stunning and concentrated example of Indo-Islamic and Qutb Shahi architecture, the galleries of the smaller tombs are of a single storey while the larger ones are two-storied. In the centre of each tomb is a sarcophagus which overlies the actual burial vault in a crypt below. The domes were originally overlaid with blue and green tiles, of which only a few pieces now remain.

The tomb complex forms part of the Golkonda Fort, Fortifications, a Monument of National Importance, administered by the Archaeological Survey of India. In 2014, UNESCO placed the complex on its "tentative list" to become a World Heritage Site, with others in the region, under the name Monuments and Forts of the Deccan Sultanate (despite there being a number of different sultanates).

An underground tunnel-like structure has been discovered in August 2026 during excavation work near the tombs. Officials of Archaeological Survey of India are expected to survey the area and determine the age and purpose of the structure.

== Location ==
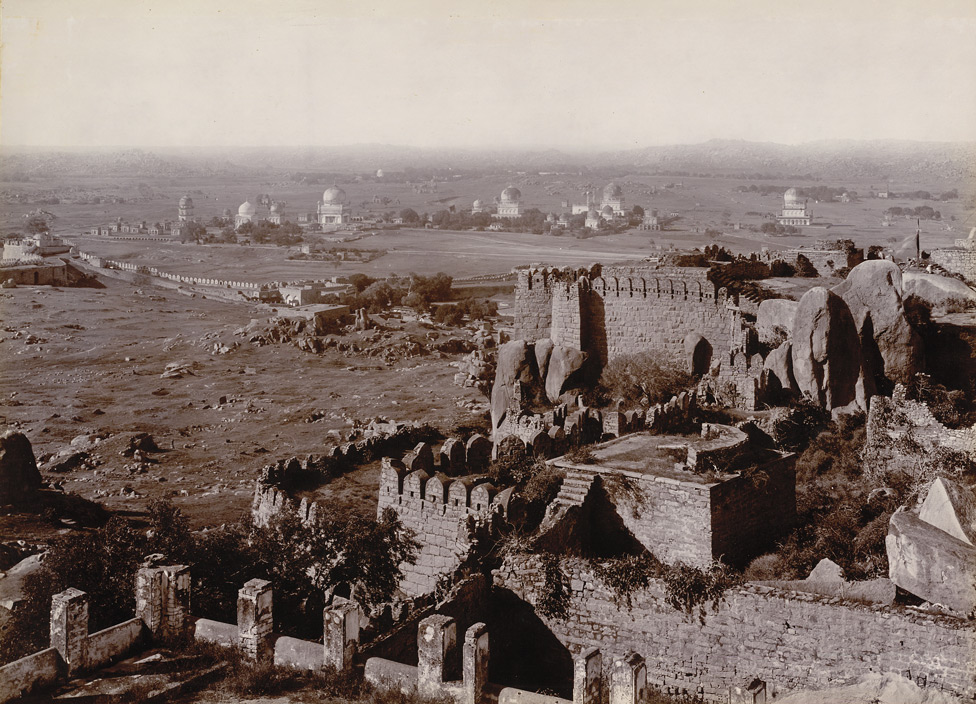
View of Qutb Shahi Tombs from the Golkonda fort

The tomb complex lies north of the outer perimeter wall of Golkonda Fort and its Banjara Darwaza (Gate of the Gypsies), amidst the Ibrahim bagh.

== Description ==
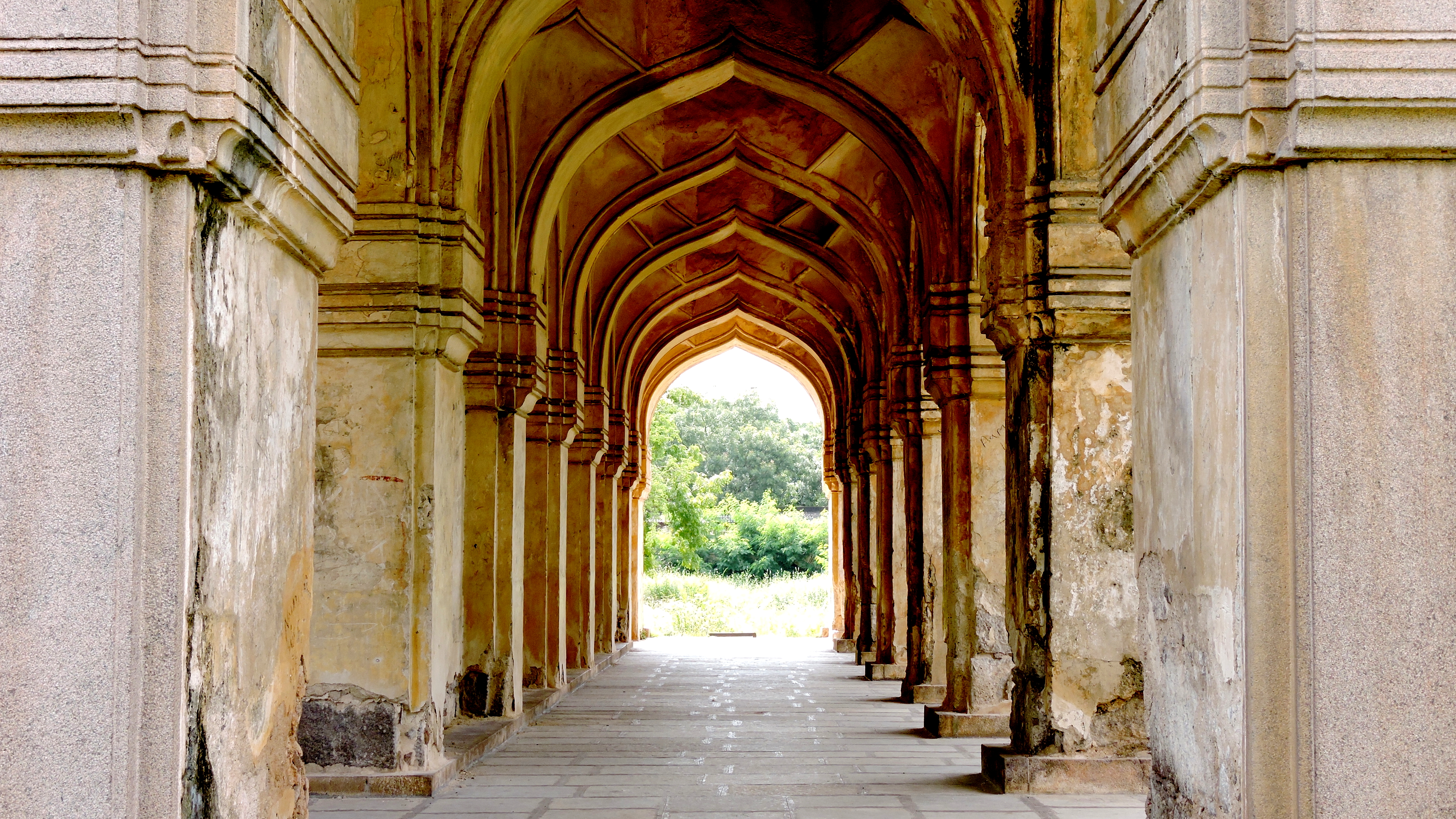
Archways at Qutb Shahi Tombs

The tombs form a large cluster and stand on a raised platform. They are domed structures built on a square base surrounded by pointed arches, a distinctive style that blends Persian and Indian forms. The tombs are structures with intricately carved stonework and are surrounded by landscaped gardens. The tombs of Sultan Quli, Jamsheed Quli, and Ibrahim Quli were the tallest structures in Hyderabad at the time of their completion.

The tombs were once furnished with carpets, chandeliers, and velvet canopies on silver poles. Copies of the Quran were kept on pedestals and readers recited verses from the holy book at regular intervals. Golden spires were fitted over the tombs of the sultans to distinguish their tombs from those of other members of the royal families.

== History ==
During the Qutb Shahi period, these tombs were held in great veneration. In 1687, during the Siege of Golconda, the tombs were converted into barracks by the invading Mughal army, and the grounds were turned into a camp. Guns were mounted onto the mausoleums in order to bomb the fortress.

The tombs fell into disrepair until Sir Salar Jung III ordered their restoration in the early 19th century. A garden was laid out, and a compound wall was built. Once again, the tomb garden of the Qutb Shahi family became a place of serene beauty. All except the last of the Qutb Shahi sultans lie buried here.

=== 21st century restoration ===
The Telangana State Archaeology and Museums Department, in collaboration with the Aga Khan Trust for Culture, has restored the tombs. The restoration of the step-wells within the complex was funded by the US Ambassadors Fund for Cultural Preservation. The restoration work started in 2013, and was unveiled by the U.S. Ambassador to India on 10 March 2020. While restoration work paused due to the COVID-19 global pandemic, as of July 2020 work had recommenced at a slower rate.

== Tombs and structures of the complex ==
=== Seven Qutub Shahi tombs ===
The complex is popularly known as seven tombs as it houses the tombs of the seven (out of the eight) sultans of the Qutub Shahi dynasty:

==== First sultan ====
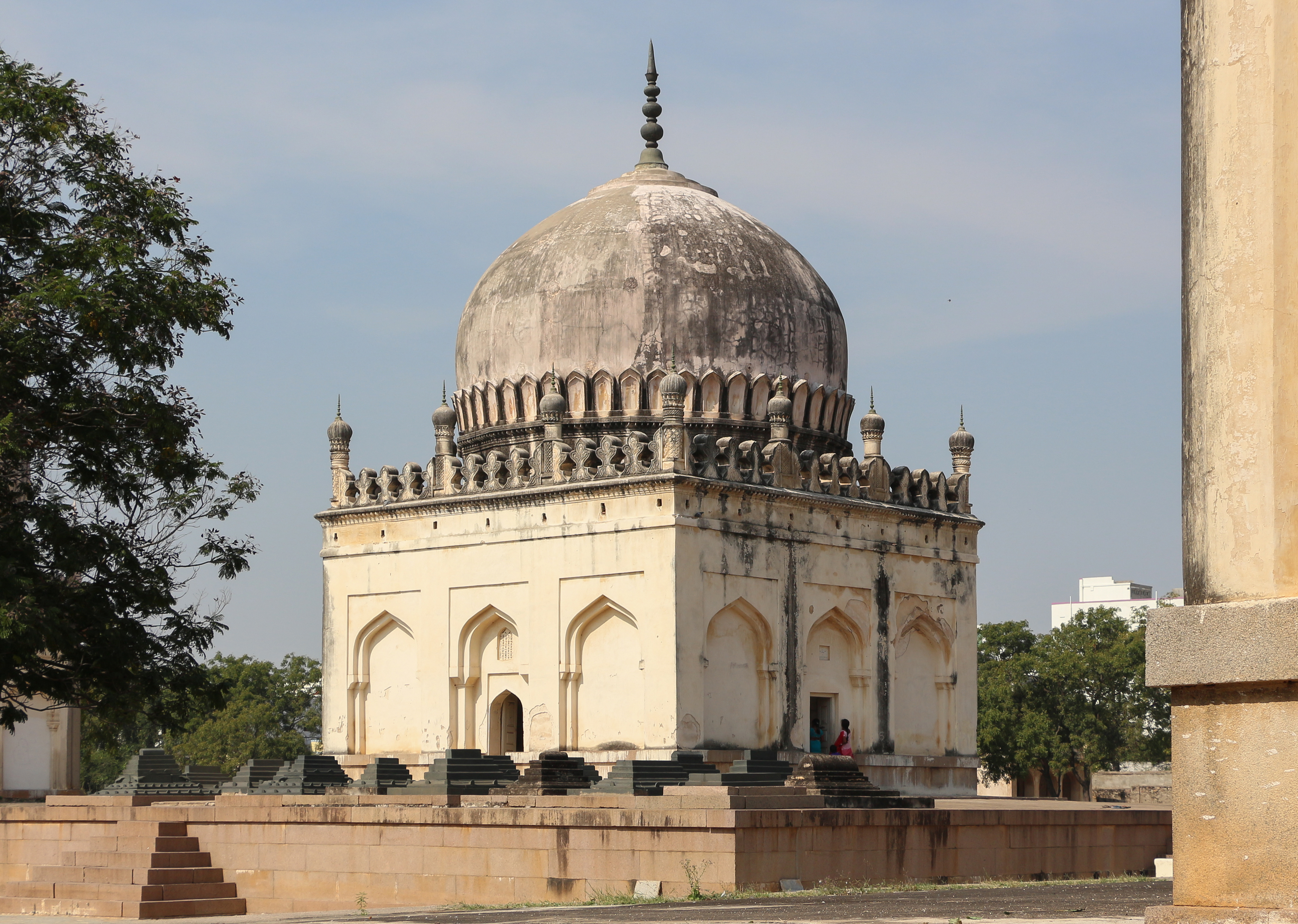
Mausoleum of Sultan Quli Qutb-ul-Mulk

Sultan Quli Qutb-ul-Mulk (1518-1543) was the first sultan.

His tomb, the style of which sets the example for the tombs of his descendants, is on an elevated terrace measuring 30 metres (98 ft) in each direction. The tomb chamber proper is octagonal, with each side measuring approximately 10 metres (33 ft). The entire structure is crowned by a circular dome. There are three graves in this tomb chamber and twenty-one laid out on the surrounding terrace, all of which lack inscription except for the main tomb. The inscription on Sultan Quli's tomb is in three bands, in the Naskh and Tauq scripts. The inscription refers to Sultan Quli as Bade Malik (Great Master) — the endearing term by which all people of the Deccan used for him. The tomb was built in 1543 CE by the Sultan, during his lifetime, as was the custom.

==== Second sultan ====
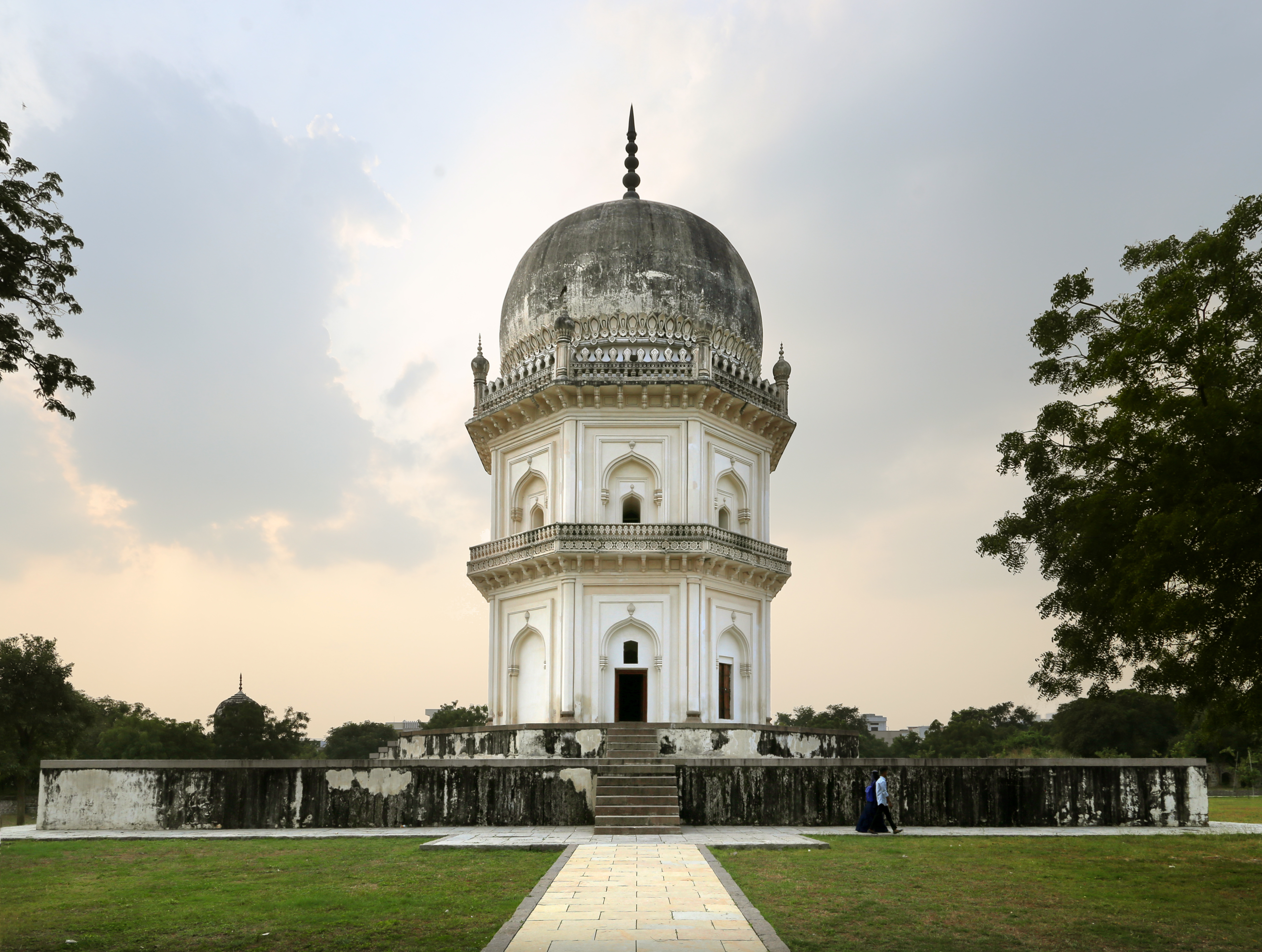
Mausoleum of Jamsheed Quli Qutb Shah

Jamsheed Quli Qutb Shah (1543-1550) was the second sultan.

Near the tomb of Sultan Quli is that of his son, Jamsheed. Built in 1550 CE, this is the only Qutb Shahi tomb which has not been fashioned from shining black basalt. Its appearance, too, is quite unlike the other tombs in the garden — it rises gracefully in two stories, unlike the squat tombs of the other kings. Jamsheed Quli Qutb Shah's is the only tomb of a Qutb Shahi ruler without any inscriptions; of course, Jamsheed's son, Subhan's tomb also does not have any inscriptions.

==== Third sultan ====
Subhan Quli Qutb Shah (1550) was the third sultan and ruled for a short time. Subhan's tomb stands midway between the tombs of his father and grandfather. He was popularly called Chhote Malik (Small Master). Subhan's tomb also does not have any inscriptions.

==== Fourth sultan ====
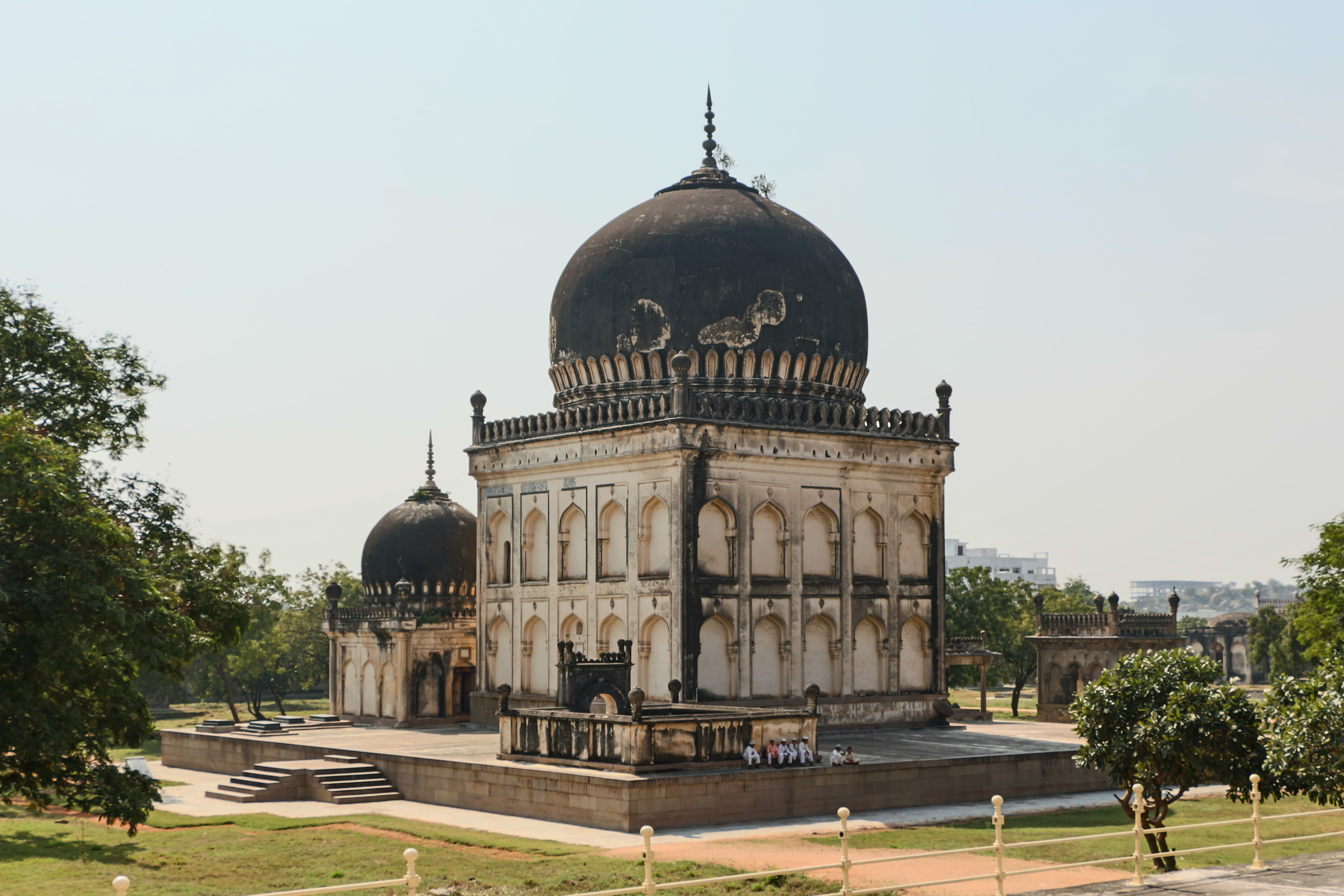
Mausoleum of Ibrahim Quli Qutb Shah

Ibrahim Quli Qutb Shah Wali (1550-1580) was the fourth sultan.

His tomb, built in 1580, after his death, is slightly larger than Sultan Quli's tomb. Traces of the enameled tiles, which once adorned this mausoleum, can still be seen on the southern wall. The tomb has two graves in the main chamber and 16 on the terrace; some of them probably are those of his six sons and three daughters. There are inscriptions in the Thuluth script on all faces of the sarcophagus. The three famous calligraphists — Isphalan, Ismail, and Taqiuddin Muhammad Salih — who left a store of Naskh, Thuluth, and Nastaliq inscriptions on the many Qutb Shahi edifices in the city, were contemporaries of Ibrahim Shah.

==== Fifth sultan ====
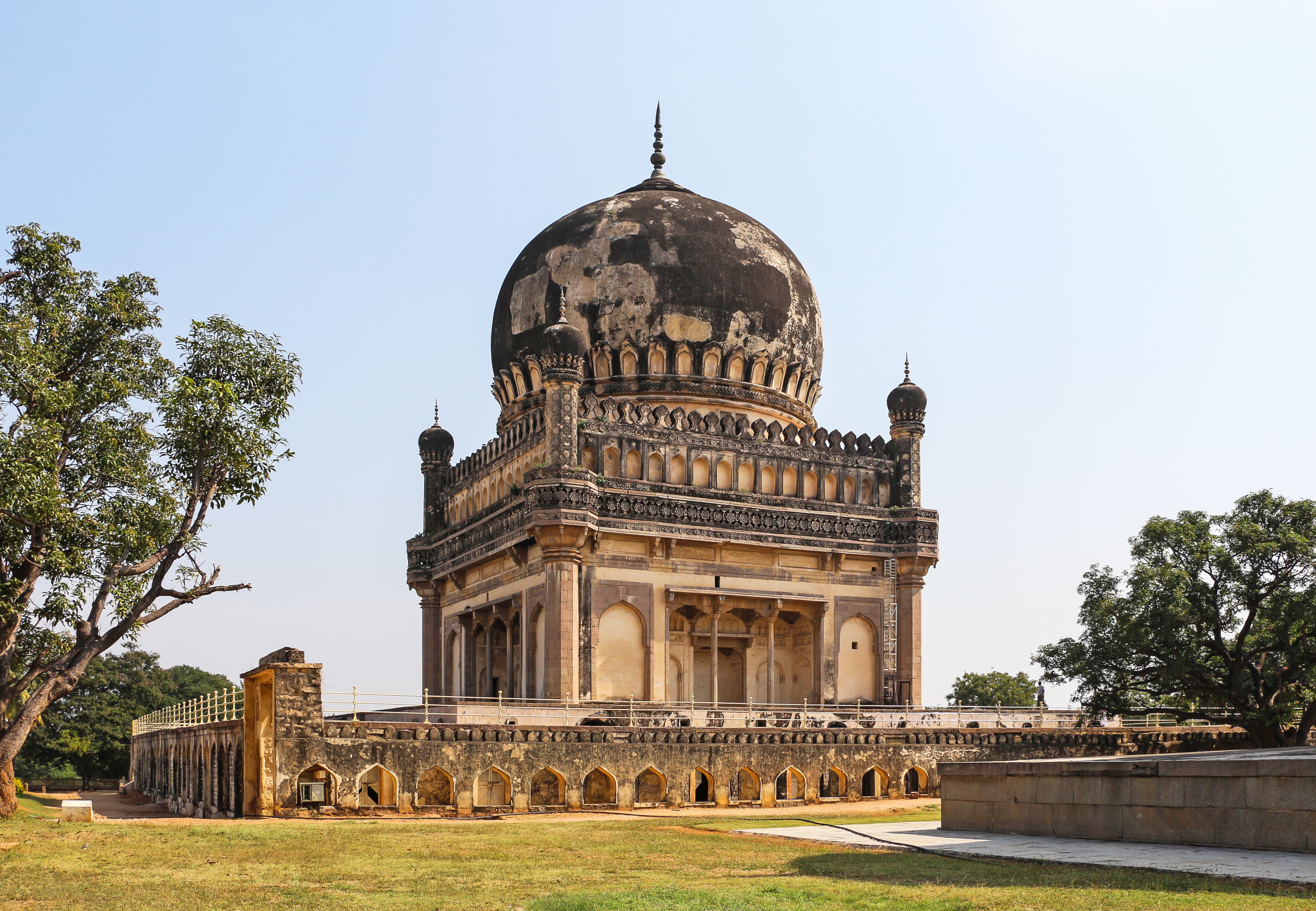
Tomb of Muhammad Quli Qutb Shah

Muhammad Quli Qutb Shah (1580-1612) was the fifth sultan.

His mausoleum is considered the grandest of the Qutb Shahi tombs. Built in 1602 CE, the tomb is on a terrace of 65 square metres (700 sq ft) and 4 metres (13 ft) high. A flight of steps leads to the mausoleum proper, which is 22 square metres (240 sq ft) on the outside and 11 square metres (120 sq ft) on the inside. There are entrances on the southern and eastern sides. The tomb is in a vault below the terrace. Inscriptions in Persian and the Naskh scripts decorate it.

==== Sixth sultan ====
Sultan Muhammad Qutb Shah (1612-1626) was the sixth sultan.

Another grand mausoleum, the facade of this tomb was once decorated with enameled tiles; only traces are now evident. There are six graves and inscriptions in Thuluth and Naskh. The mausoleum was built in 1626.

==== Seventh sultan ====
Abdullah Qutb Shah (1626-1672) was the seventh sultan.

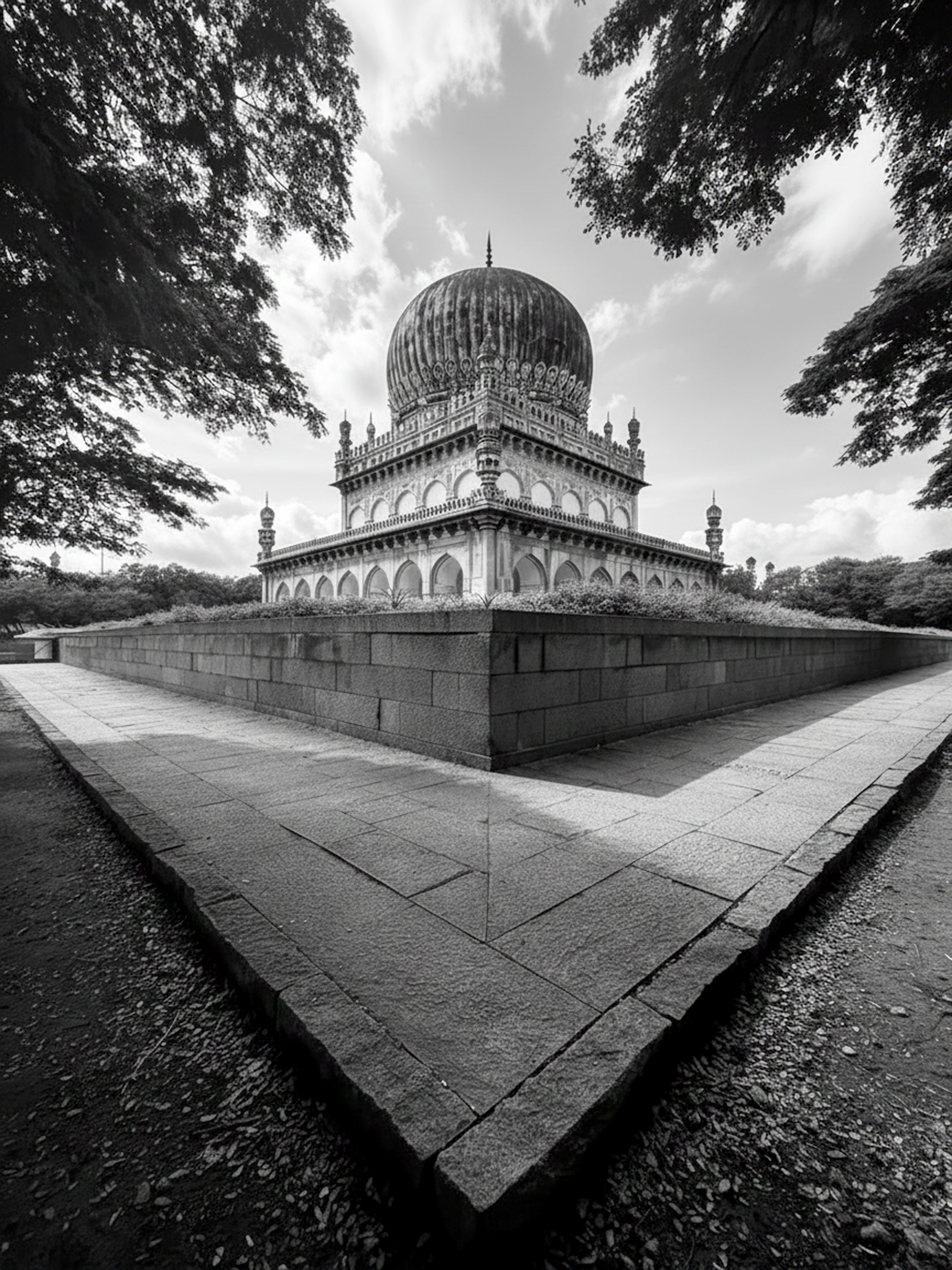
The Qutub Shahi tombs are a series of Islamic tombs and mosques built by the various kings of the Qutub Shahi dynasty.

His tomb is the last of the royal tombs, as Abul Hasan Qutb Shah (Tana Shah), the last Qutb Shahi Sultan, was a prisoner in the fortress of Daulatabad, near Aurangabad, when he died. While the tombs of those who ruled dominate the area, interspersed are many other monuments, most of them tombs of other members of the royal family.

=== Other tombs and structures ===
Mausoleum of Hayat Bakshi Begum

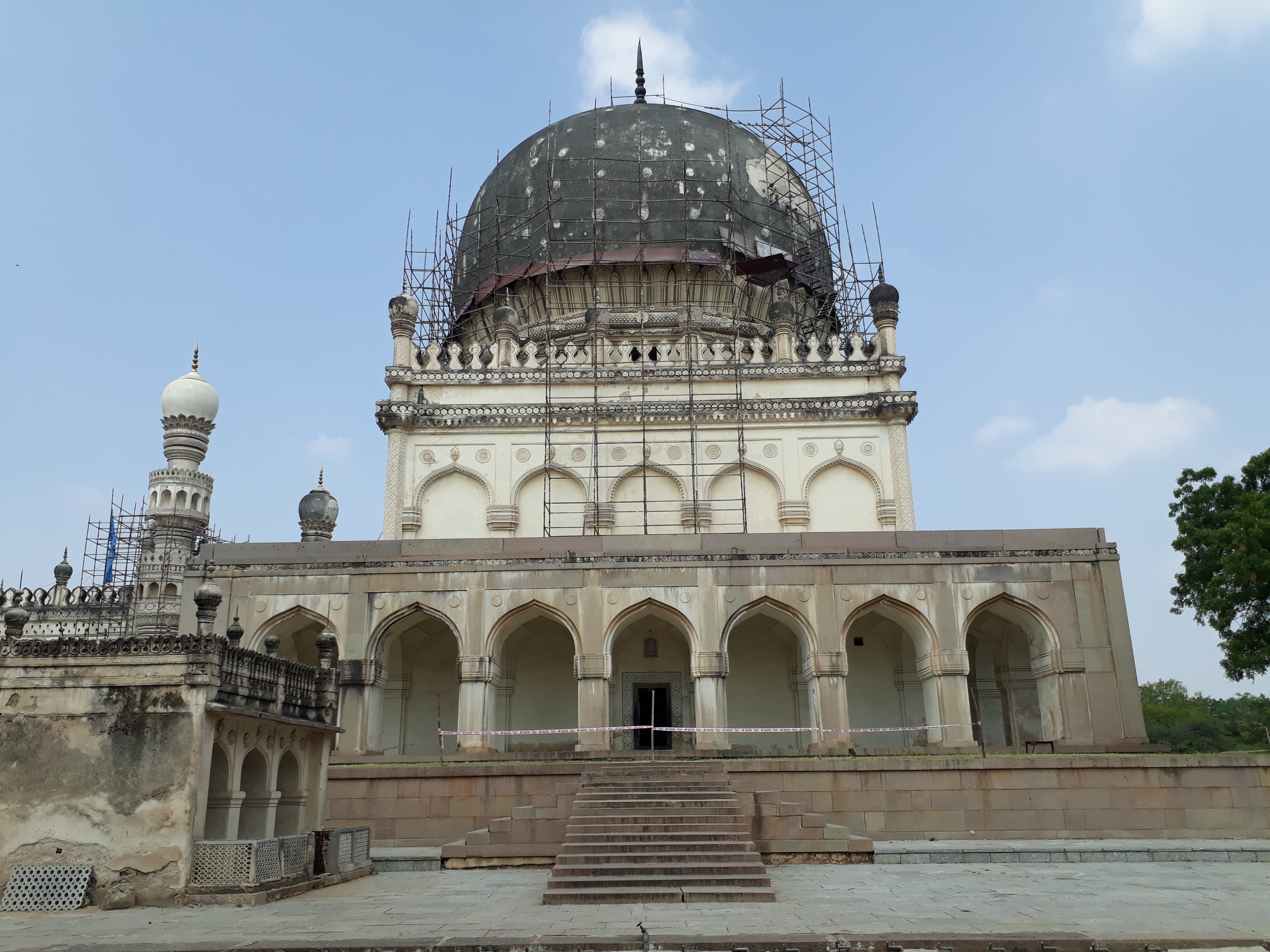
Mausoleum of Hayat Bakshi Begum

Hayat Bakshi Begum (died: 1667) was the only daughter of Muhammed Quli Qutb Shah, the fifth sultan, and the wife of Sultan Muhammed Qutb Shah, the sixth sultan, and the mother of Abdullah Qutb Shah, the seventh sultan. She was affectionately known as "Ma Saheba" (Revered Mother). The tomb-garden of the sultans of Golkonda was known as "Lagar-e-Faiz Athar" (a place for bountiful entertainment) in the days of the Qutb Shahi rulers, for some item or song or dance or even an occasional play was staged here every evening, free of cost, to entertain the poor.

Incomplete tomb of Mir Ahmed

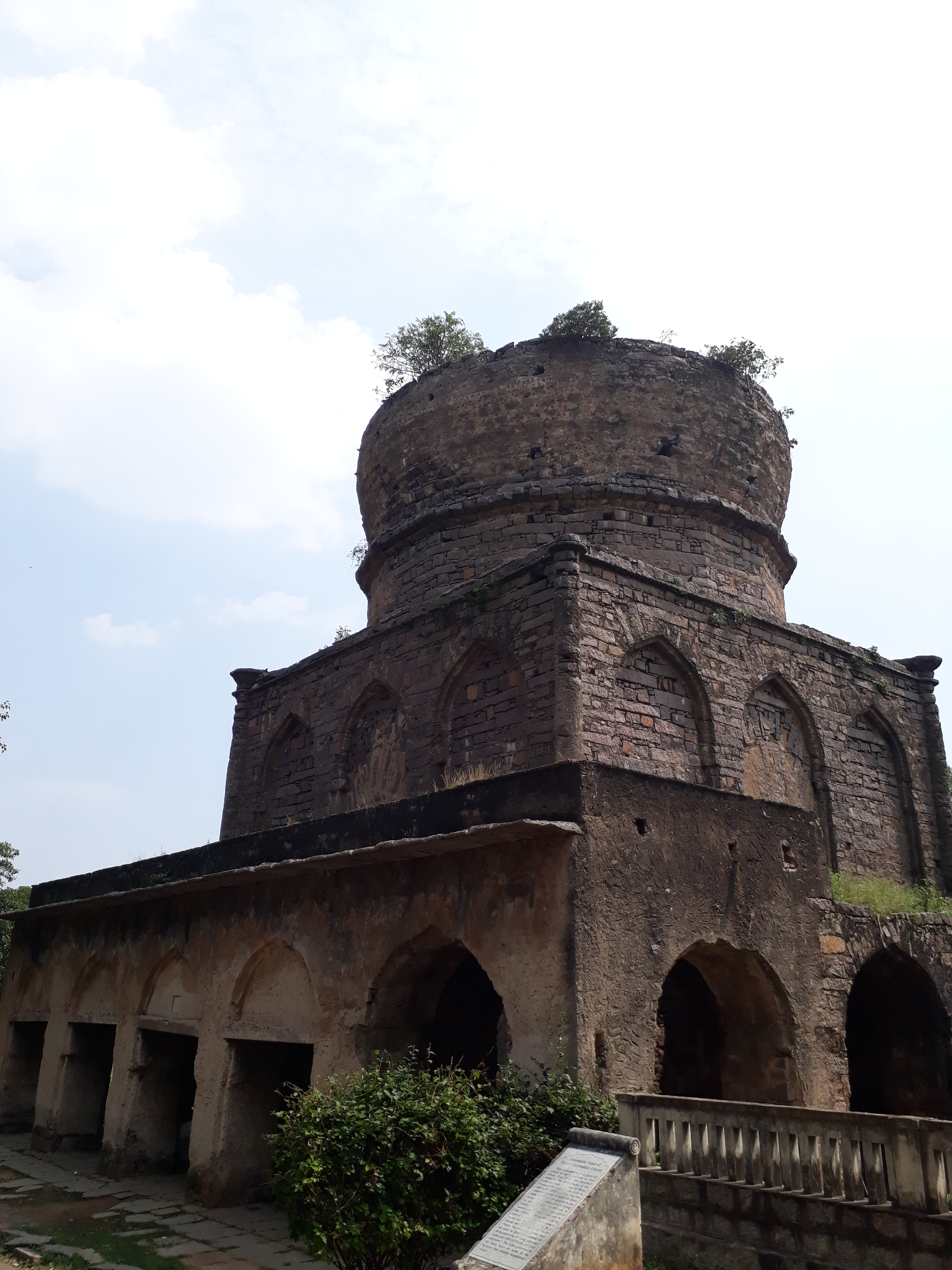
Unfinished tomb of Nizamuddin Ahmed

The last sultan of the dynasty, Abul Hasan Qutb Shah (also known as Tana Shah), was not buried alongside his ancestor. Instead, he was buried at Khuldabad. The mausoleum which Abul Hasan, the last Qutb Shahi Sultan, began building for himself, actually houses the grave of Mir Ahmed, the son of Sultan Abdullah's son-in-law and the sister of Abbas II Safair, the Shah of Persia. The tomb of Fadma Khanum, one of Sultan Abdullah's daughters, stands near the mausoleum of her husband, Mir Ahmed. Hers is the only Qutb Shahi tomb not surmounted by a dome.

Mausoleum of Fatima Sultana

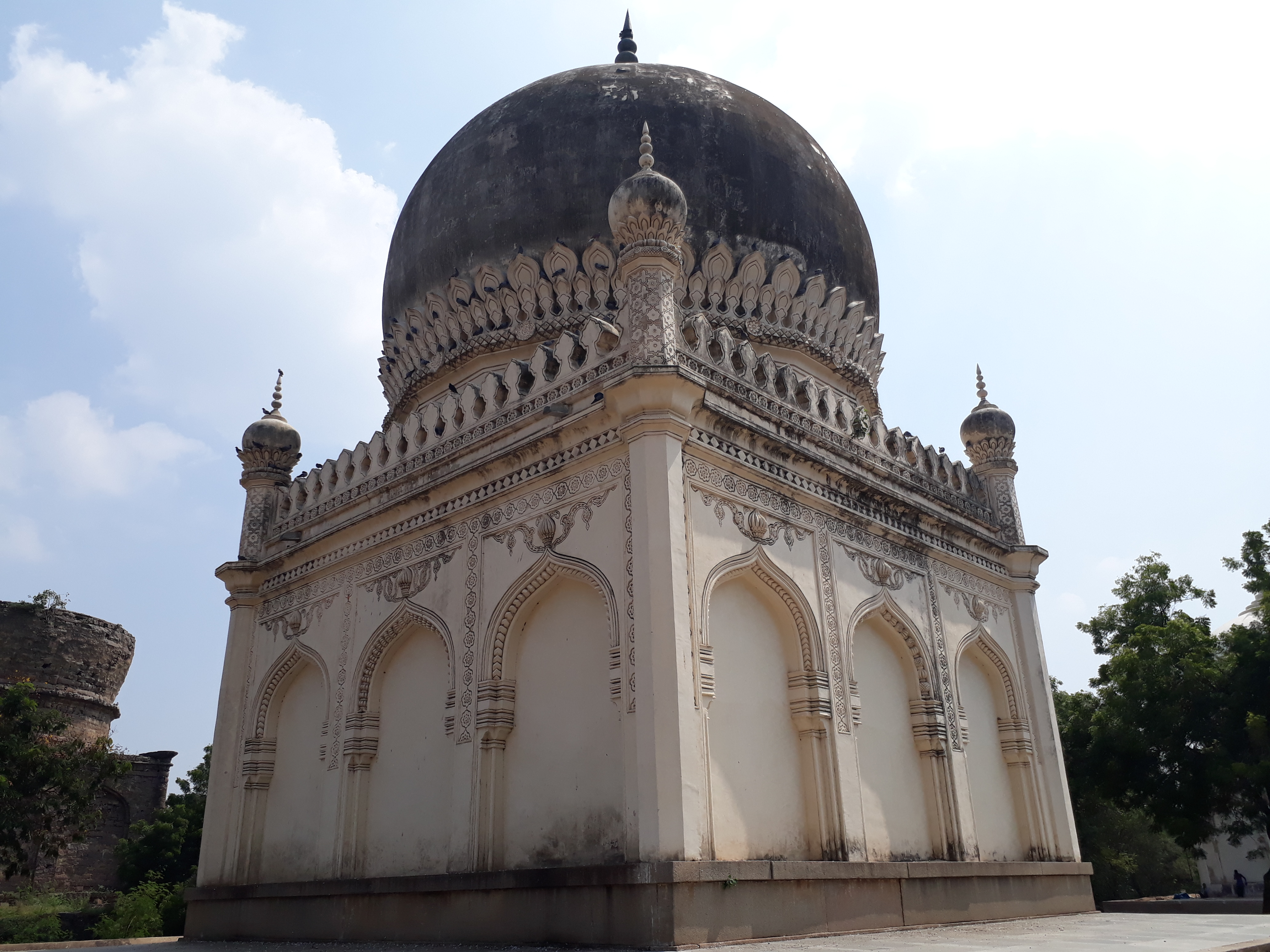
Mausoleum of Fatima Sultana

The tomb of Fatima Sultan, with its bulbous dome, is near the entrance to the tomb-garden. Fatima was the sister of Muhammed Qutb Shah. Her tomb houses several graves, two with inscriptions. Immediately to the south of Muhammed Quli's tomb are three uninscribed tombs. There are the mausoleums of Kulthoom, Muhammed Qutb Shahi's granddaughter born of the son of the sultan's favourite wife Khurshid Bibi, her (Kulthoom's) husband and daughter. Kulthoom's tomb is on the west of this cluster.

Other tombs

The twin-tombs of the two favourite hakims (physicians) of Sultan Abdullah — Nizamuddin Ahmed Gilani and Abdul Jabbar Gilani — were built in 1651. They are among the few Qutb Shahi tombs that are not of royalty. Another pair are those of Premamati and Taramati, the favourite courtesans of Sultan Abdullah Shah, who were laid to rest beside his tomb. One other tomb which is not that of a Qutb Shahi family member is that of Neknam Khan. Neknam Khan, who served in Abdullah's army, was the commander-in-chief of the Carnatic. His tomb is on a platform outside the mausoleum of Ibrahim Qutb Shah. It was built in 1672, two years after Nekam Khan's death.

Dargah of Hussain Shah Wali

To the west of the tombs lies the dargah of Hussain Shah Wali, the revered Sufi saint. He is most affectionately remembered by people as the builder of Hussain Sagar in 1562. Among other monuments in the garden that are not tombs, the most important are the mortuary bath and the Masjid of Hayat Bakshi Begum.

Mortuary bath

The mortuary bath, which stands opposite the tomb of Muhammad Quli, was built by Sultan Quli to facilitate the ritual washing of the bodies of the dead kings and others of the royal family before they were carried to their final resting place. The practice followed was to bring the body out of the fort, through the Banjara Gate, to this bath, before carrying it away for burial with the ritualistic pomp that was required to mark the occasion. A large number of people — relatives, officials, friends, and fond subjects — attended. The bath is one of the finest existing specimens of ancient Persian or Turkish baths.

Mosques

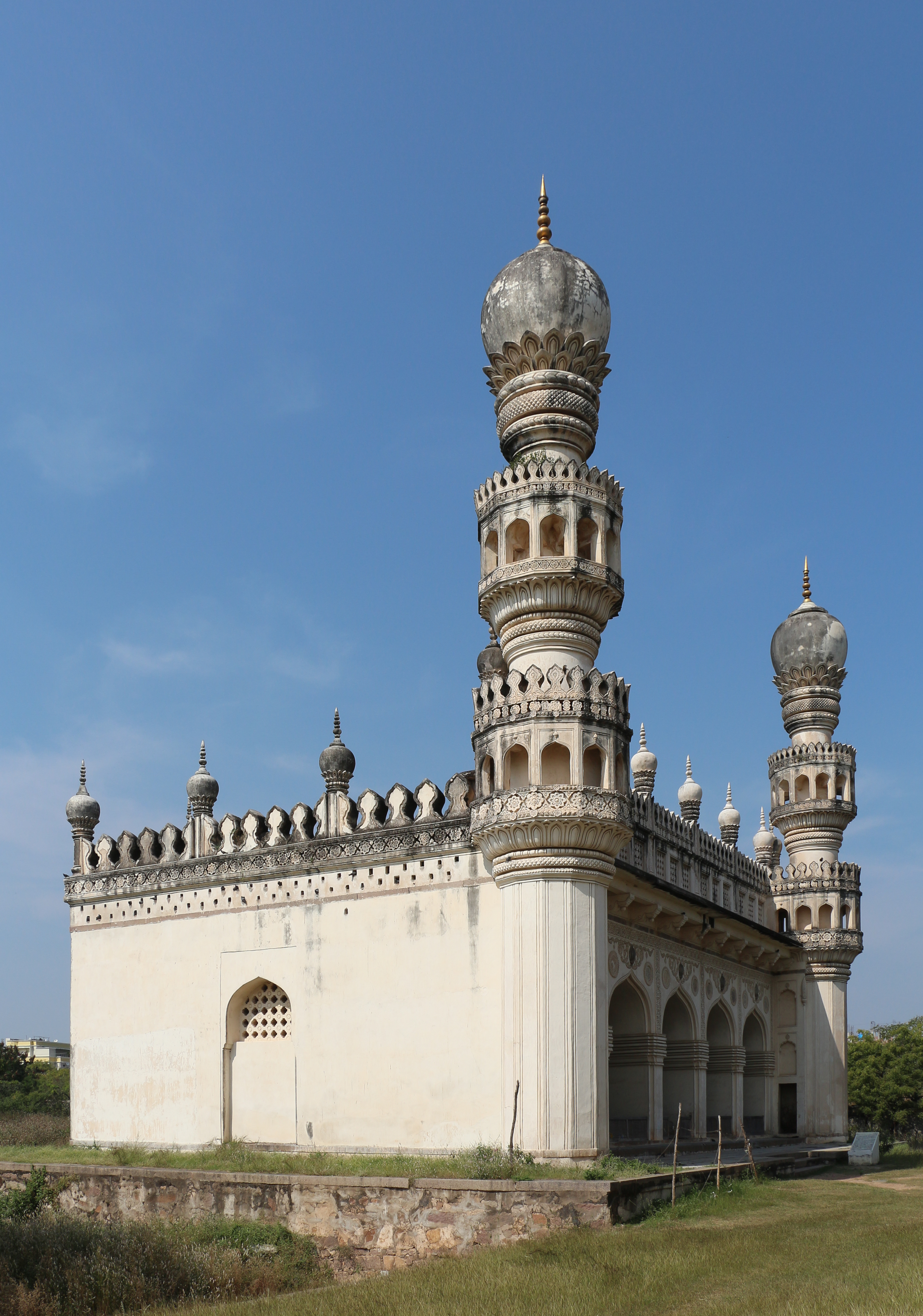
The Great Mosque in the Qutb Shahi Tombs Complex

The Qutb Shahis built a number of masjids all over Golkonda and Hyderabad, and almost every tomb has a masjid adjacent. The biggest and the grandest such masjid is by the mausoleum of Hayat Bakshi Begum. Popularly known as the great masjid of the Golkonda tombs, it was built in 1666 CE Fifteen cupolas decorate the roof and the prayer-hall is flanked by two lofty minarets. The impression, as a whole, is one of majesty and splendour. The inscriptions in the masjid are in calligraphic art.

== Ropeway ==
Golconda-Qutub Shahi Tomb Ropeway, a 1.5 km long ropeway project between hilltop Golconda Fort and 7 Qutb Shahi tombs was approved in September 2025 under Parvatmala, tenders were invited for feasibility study, following which DPR will be prepared for the construction.

== In art and literature ==
An engraving of a painting by William Purser entitled The Tombs of the Kings of Golconda. is the subject of a poetical illustration by Letitia Elizabeth Landon in Fisher's Drawing Room Scrap Book, 1838.

== Gallery ==
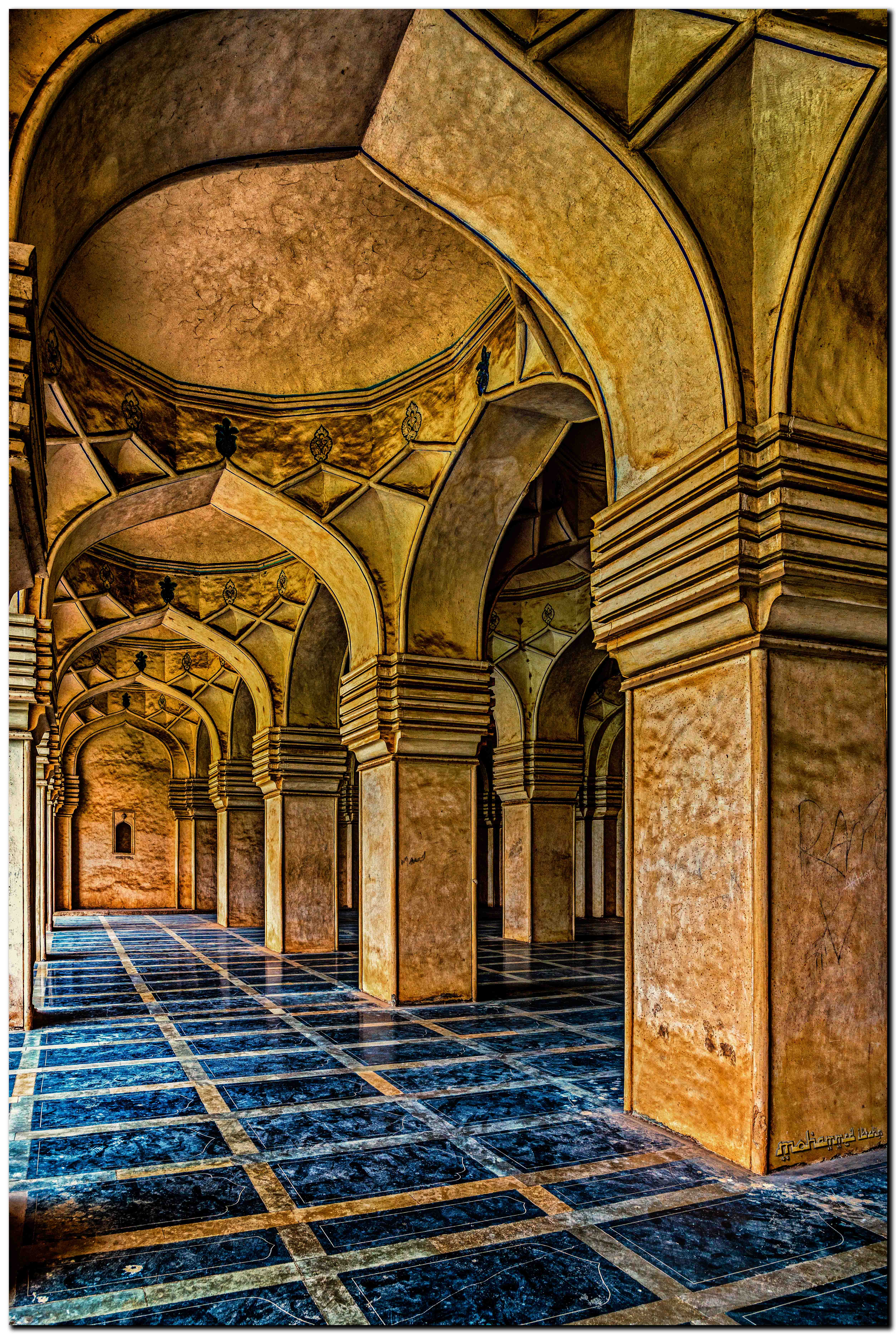
Qutb Shahi Mosque interior

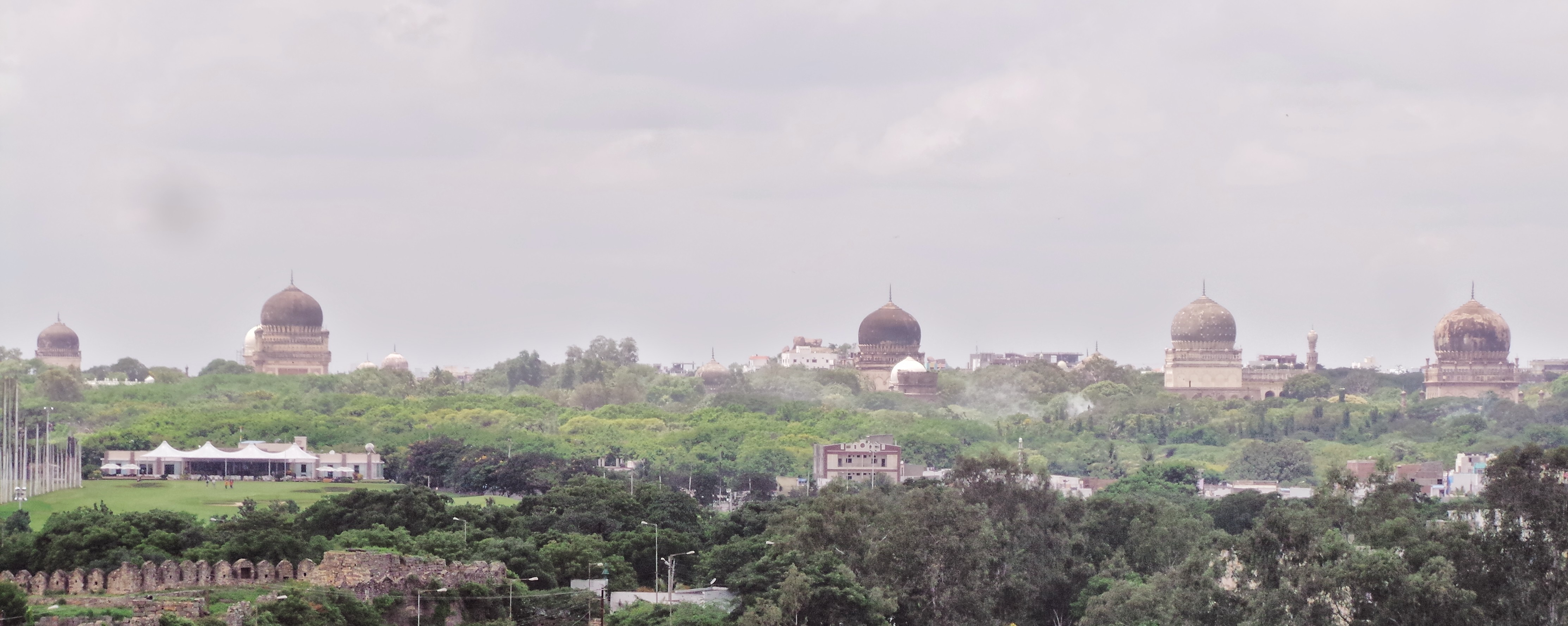
Distant shot of all the Qutb Shahi Tombs, Hyderabad

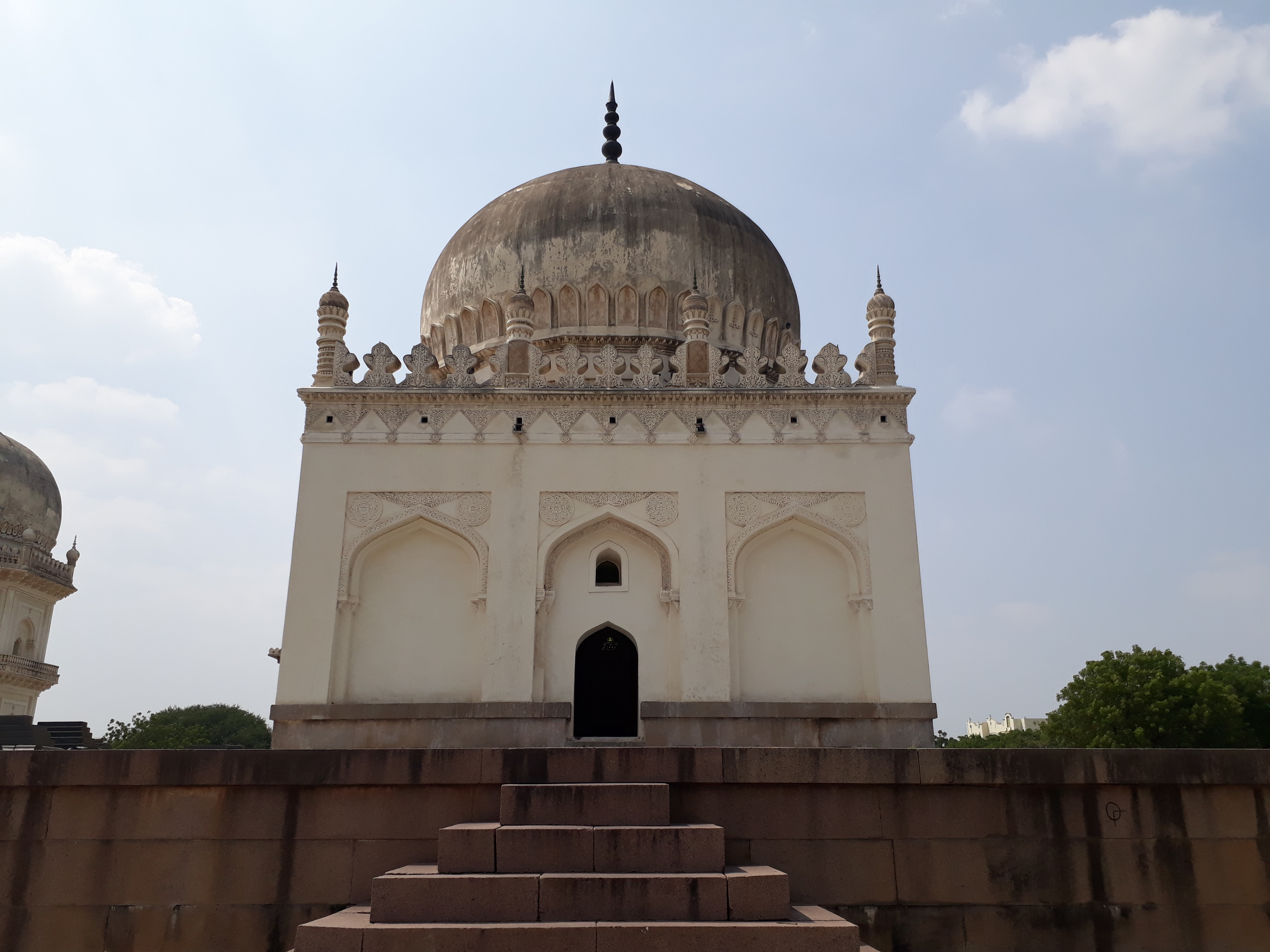
Mausoleum of Kulsum Begum

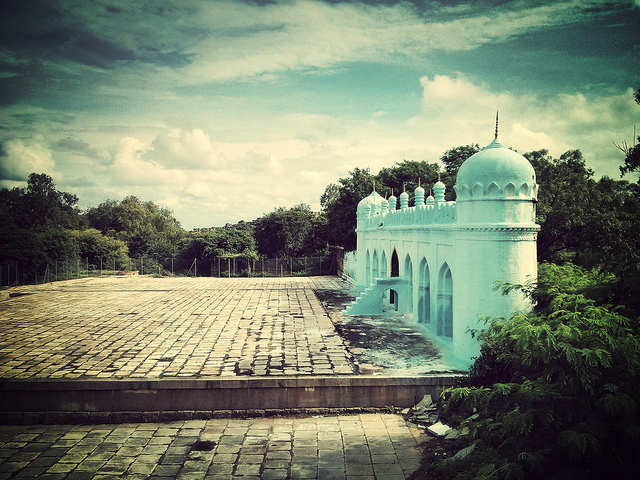
Qibla wall in Qutb Shahi

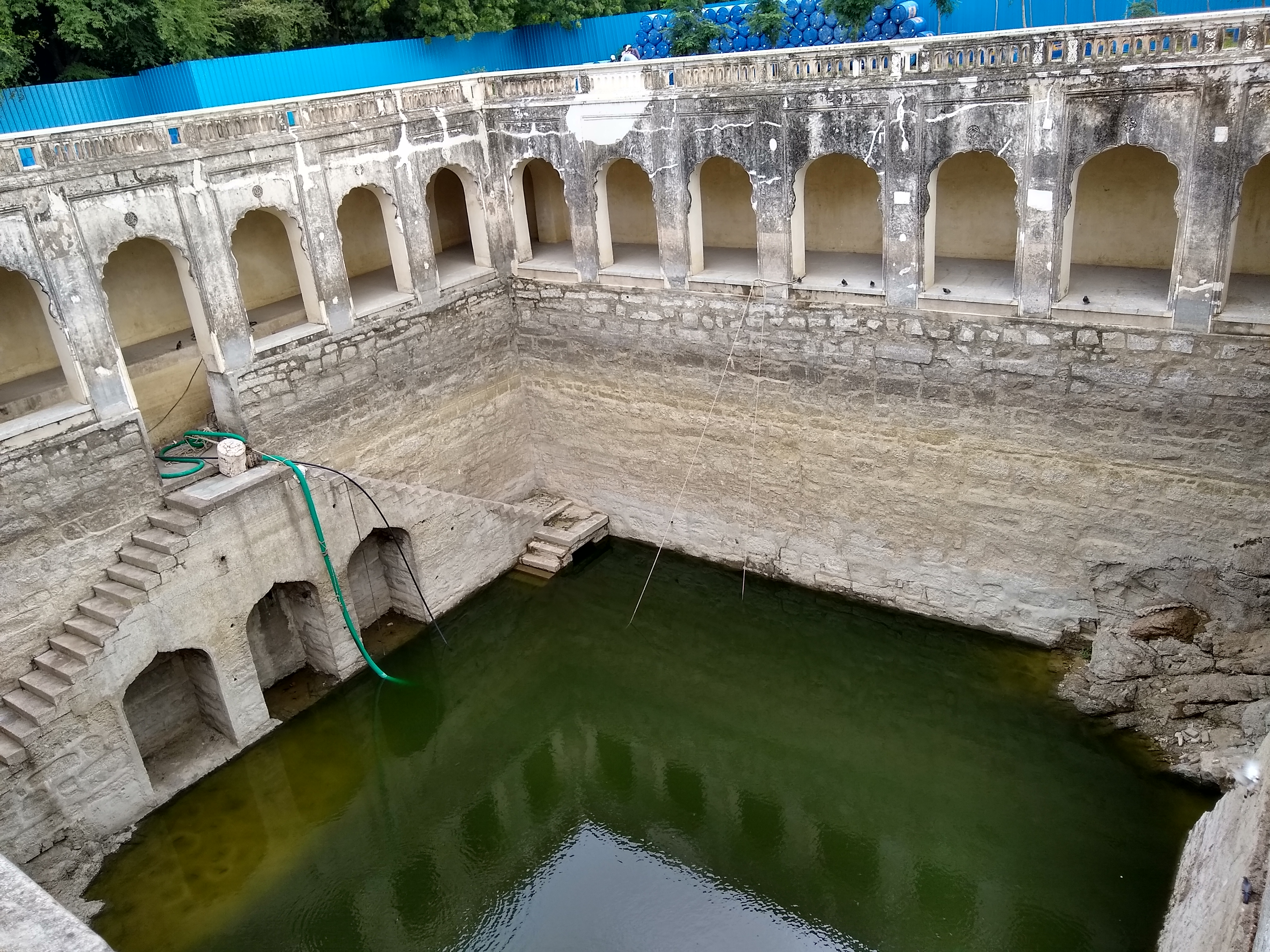
Badi Baoli at Qutb Shahi Tombs

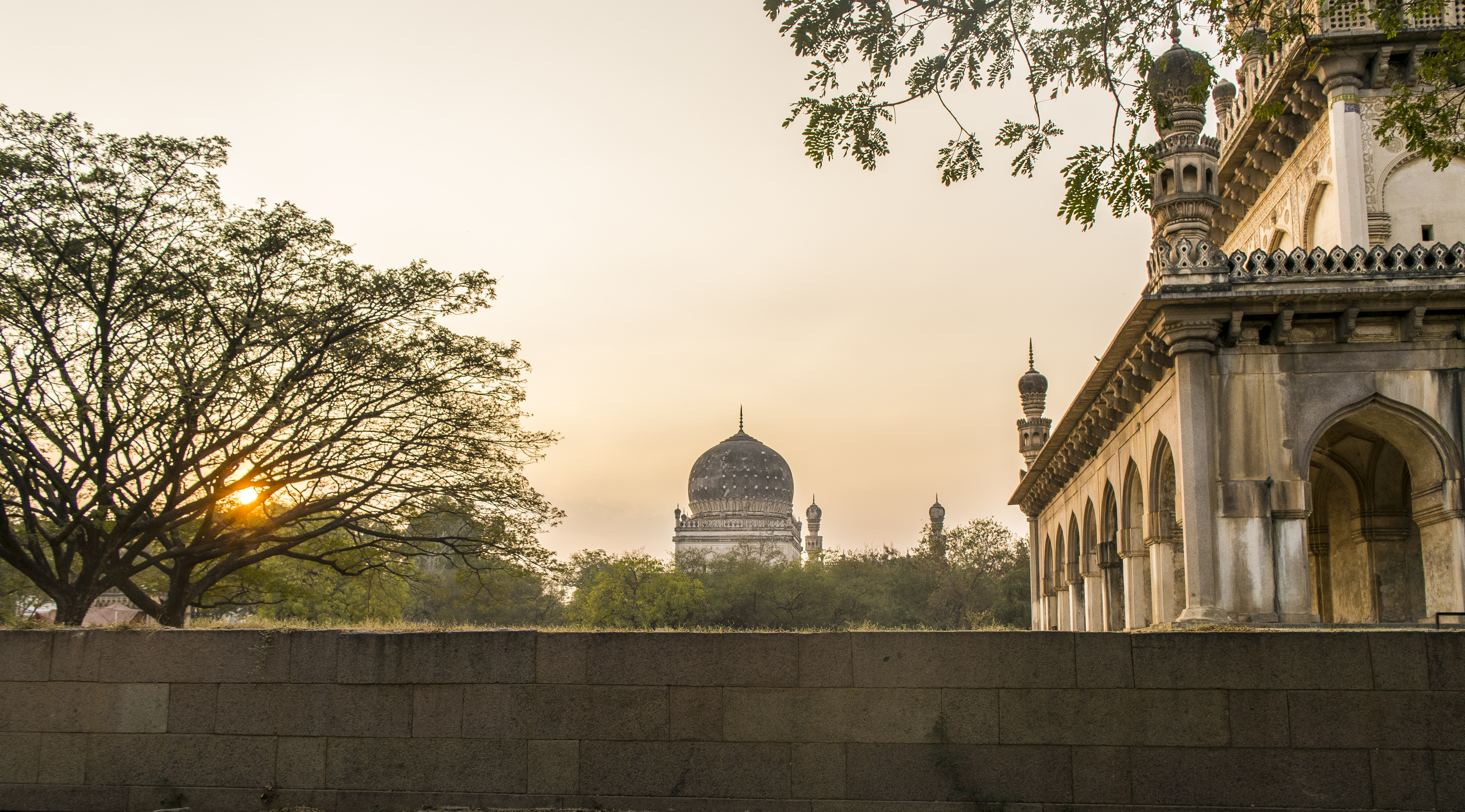
Sunset

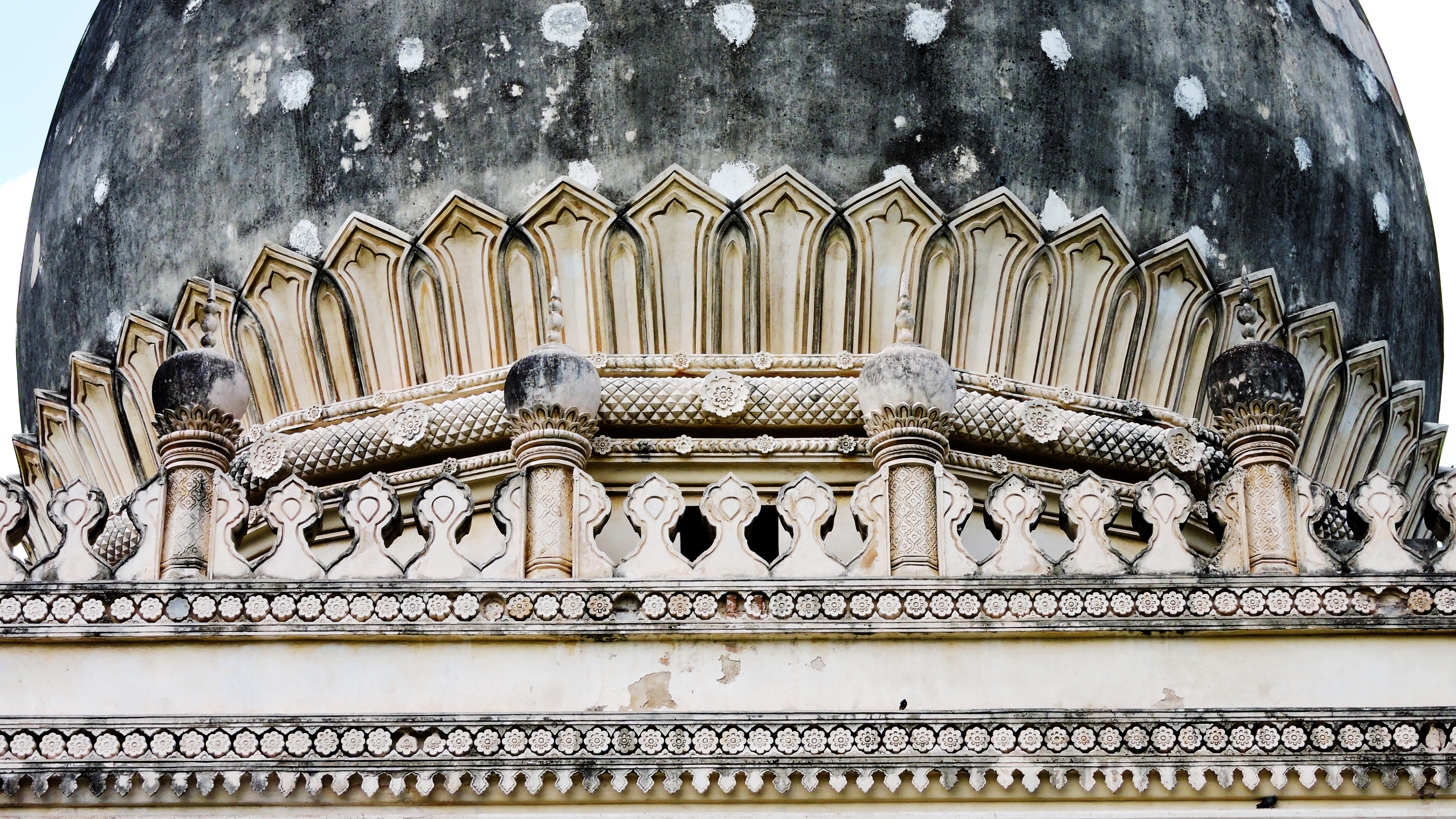
Base of the dome of the mausoleum of Hayat Bakshi Begum

Silhouette of Sultan Quli Qutub Shah Tomb

== See also ==
- Islam in India
- List of mosques in Telangana
- List of Monuments of National Importance in Telangana
- Purani Haveli
- Taramati Baradari
