= Hayat Bakshi Begum =

Royal consort of Sultan Muhammad Qutb Shah

- Died: 26 February 1667
- Burial: Qutb Shahi tombs
- Spouse: Sultan Muhammad Qutb Shah
- Issue: 3, including Abdullah Qutb Shah
- House: Qutb Shahi
- Dynasty: Qara Qoyunlu
- Father: Muhammad Quli Qutb Shah

Hayat Bakshi Begum (died 26 February, 1667) was the royal consort of Sultan Muhammad Qutb Shah, the sixth ruler of the Qutb Shai Dynasty in south India and daughter of Muhammad Quli Qutb Shah, fifth Sultan of the dynasty. When her son Abdullah Qutb Shah was made sultan at the age of fourteen in 1626, she acted as regent for the first few years of his reign, and continued to wield considerable influence in the state until her death.

== Biography ==
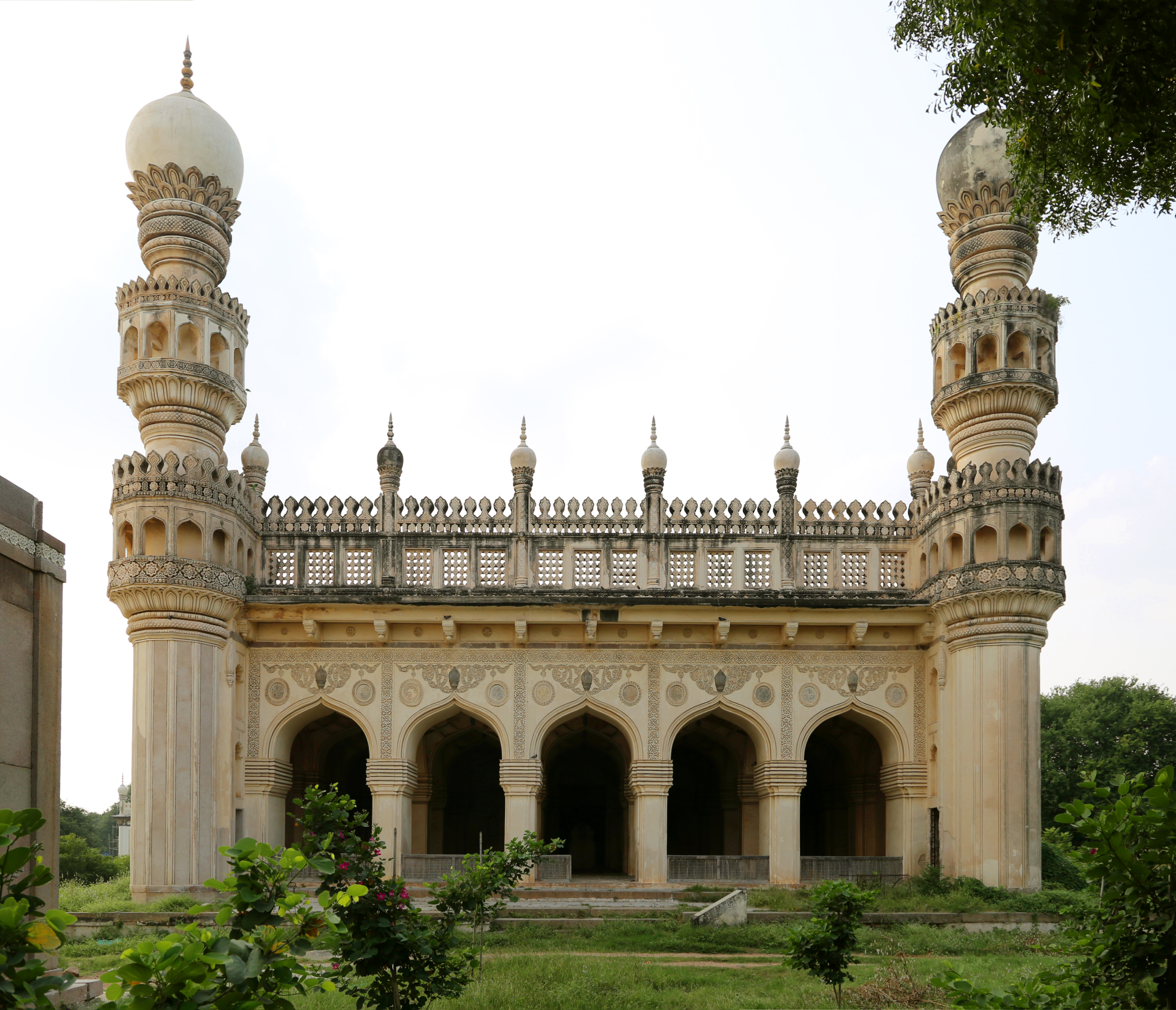
The Hayat Bakshi Mosque is named after her

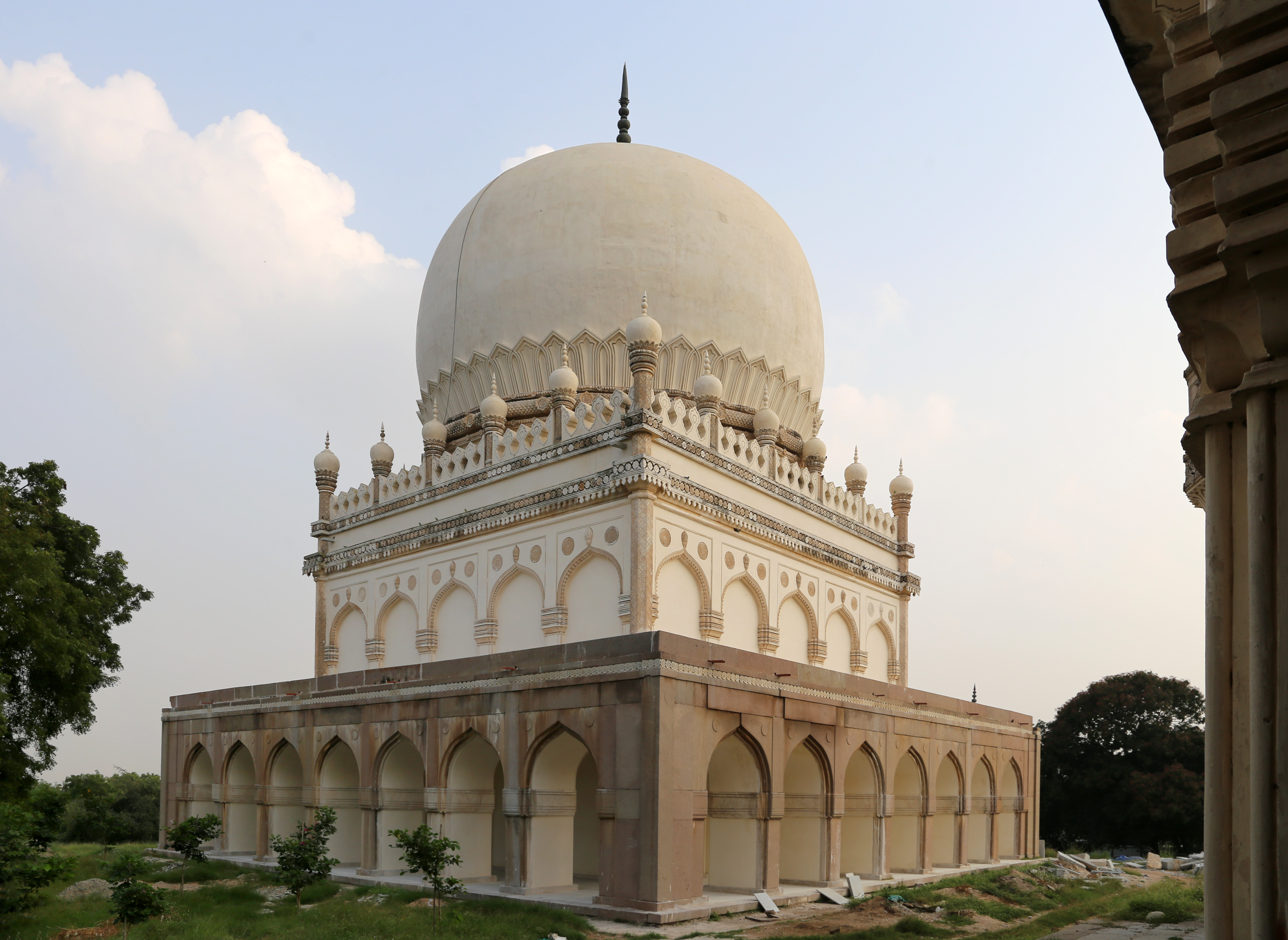
Tomb of Hayath Bakshi Begum within the Qutb Shahi tombs

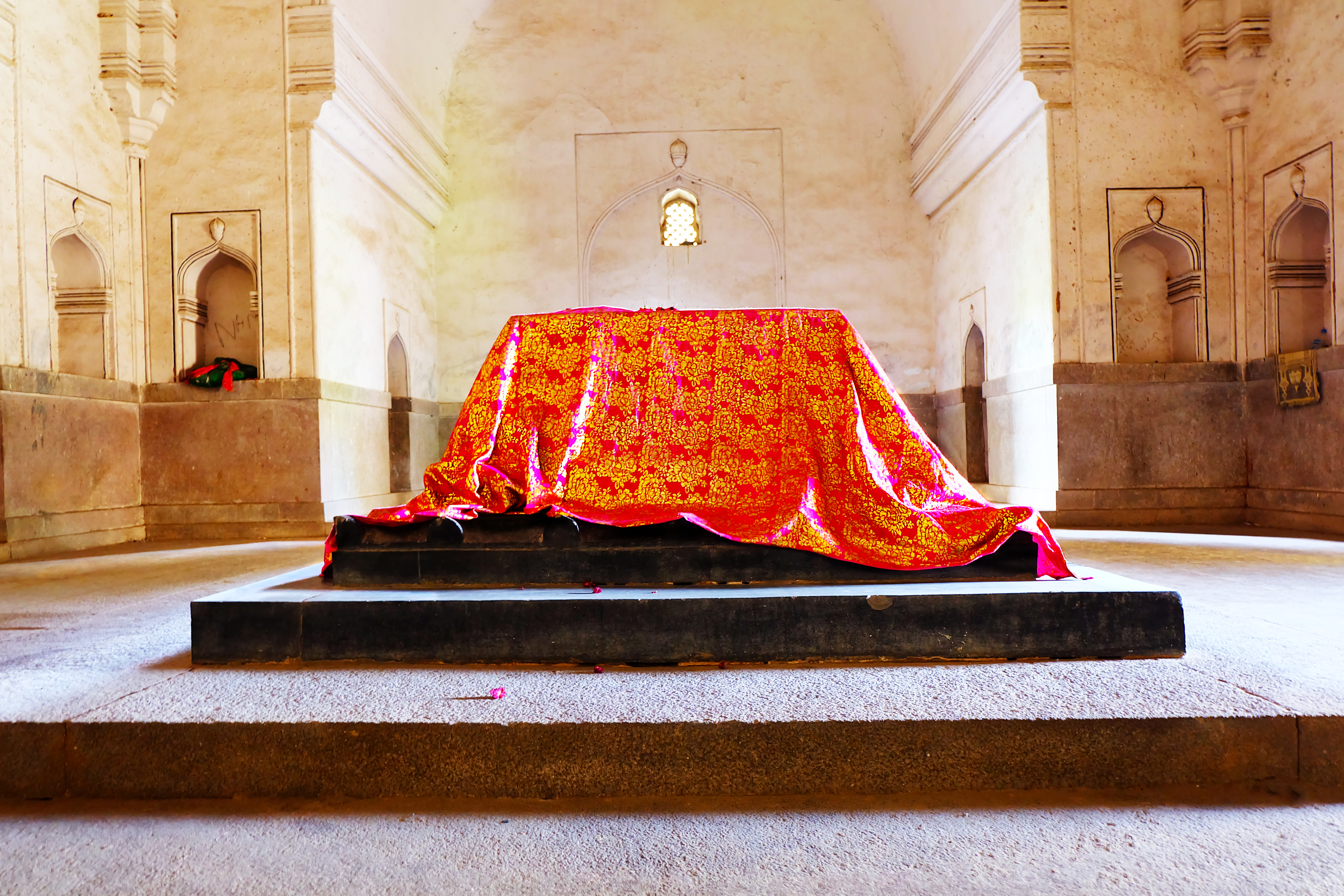
Hayat Bakshi Begum's sarcophagus

=== Early life ===
Hayat Bakshi, whose name meant Life, was born in 1591. She was the only daughter of Muhammad Quli Qutb Shah, who did not have any male heirs. Muhammad Quli is alleged to have brought her up as he would have a son, beginning with the celebration that were initiated on her birth As she grew older, the sultan let her be educated with the skills needed to be a ruler.

=== Marriage of Hayat Bakshi Begum and Muhammad Qutb Shah ===
Hayat Bakshi began receiving marriage proposals from the age of 11, among the most notable being one from the Safavid King, Shah Abbas, for one of his three sons. However, Muhammad Quli had other plans and she was married to her cousin Muhammad Qutb Shah in 1607.

There is no contemporary account of their wedding, although a later account described the revelries that took place. The city was decorated with earthen lamps and all the citizens were well fed amidst great festivities. Muhamad Qutb Shah, being a great patronage of arts, organised various events of dance and music for the citizens. Once the festivities were over, the couple moved into Khudabad Mahal. The palace was considered to was extraordinarily opulent and luxurious.

In 1611 Muhammad Quli died. Muhammad Qutb became the king of the dynasty and Hayat Bakshi became Queen Consort. Sources state that Muhammad Qutb was a pious, philanthropic and cultured ruler, and turned to the advice of Hayat Bakshi for several state matters. This gave her a good practice in managing the state affairs.

Hayat Bakshi gave birth to a boy, Abdullah Qutb Shah, in the year 1614. A prophecy foretold by several astrologers was that there would be a tragedy for Muhammad Qutb Shah if the son saw the face of his father before the age of 12. Hayat Bakshi therefore developed a separate township for his son to keep them apart, the area is now known as Sultan Nager, located in the eastern part of Hyderabad. However, a couple of years after Muhammad Qutb saw his son, he died. Hayat Bakshi's practice in the governance of the state had prepared her for this calamity, he closed the palace door at the same time and declared Abdullah Qutb Shah as king of the dynasty.

=== Hayat Bakshi Begum as Ma Saheb (Queen Mother) ===
In 1626, Sultan Muhammad died, and Hayat had her son Abdullah Qutb Shah crowned. The new sultan was fourteen years old, and Hayat ruled as regent for the first few years of his reign. During the reign of Abdullah Qutb Shah the most significant challenge was to keep the Mughals at the bay. In 1656 when Aurangzeb, then viceroy of Deccan, besieged Abdullah Qutb Shah in Golconda he asked for considerable tribute. Hayat Bakshi managed to soften the deal, agreeing with Aurangzeb that Abdullah's daughter would be married off to Mughal prince Muhammad Sultan and the Golconda Sultanate would be ceded to the Mughals after Abdullah's death. In return Aurangzeb significantly lowered the required financial tribute.

Hayat Bakshi died on 26 February 1667. She was buried in a tomb within the Qutb Shahi tombs. Her tomb is the only woman's tomb which is equal in size to the tombs of the kings.

== Legacy ==
In 2019, IIT Hyderabad released a Virtual Reality film entitled Ma Saheba – The queen of Hyderabad, about Hayat Bakshi Begum.
