= Sultan Muhammad Qutb Shah =

Sultan of Golconda from 1612 to 1626

Muhammad Qutb Shah
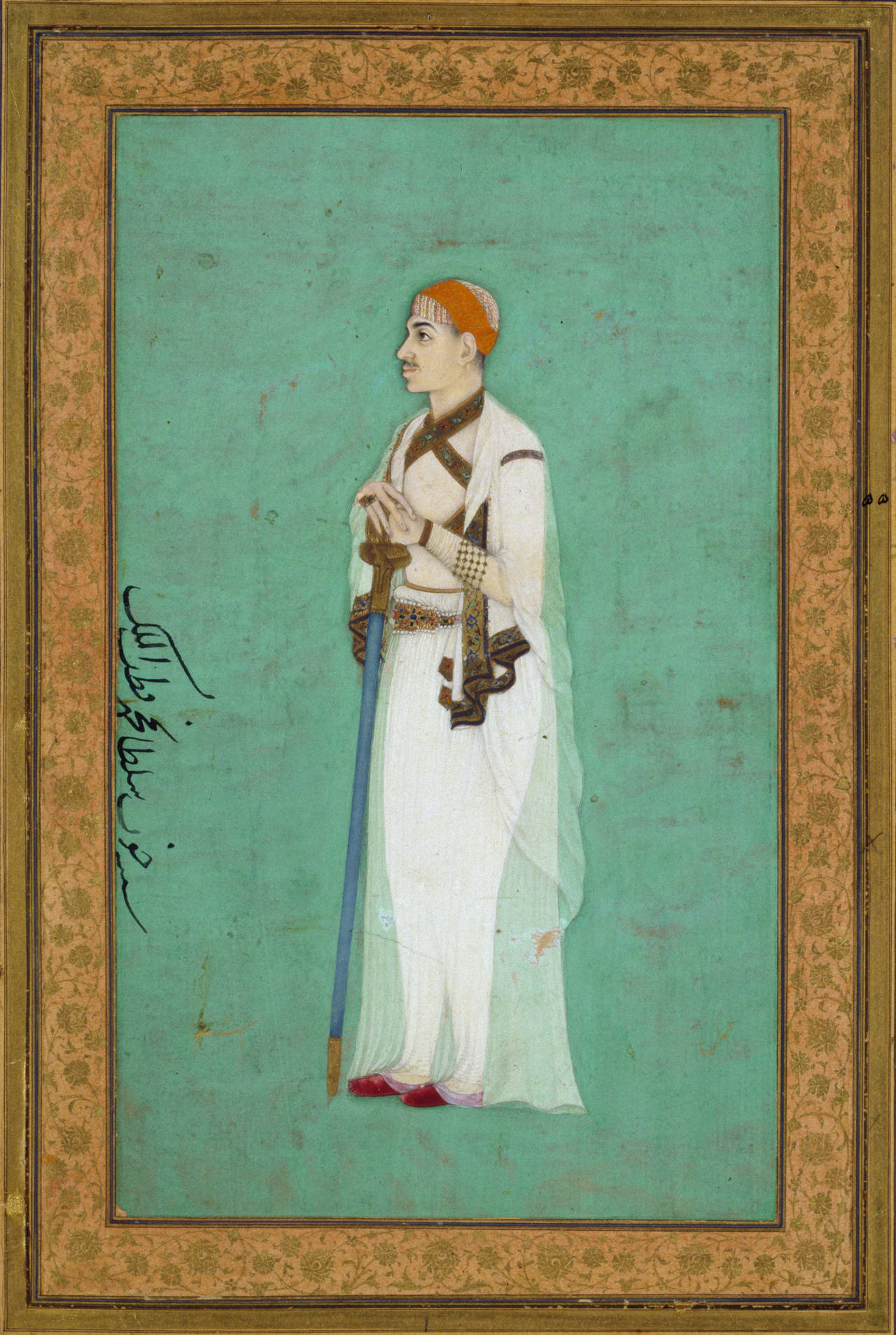

6th Sultan of Golconda
- Reign: 11 January 1612 – 9 February 1626
- Predecessor: Muhammad Quli Qutb Shah
- Successor: Abdullah Qutb Shah
- Born: April 1593
- Died: 9 February 1626 (aged 32)
- Burial: Qutb Shahi tombs, Hyderabad, India
- Spouse: Daughter of Muhammad Quli Qutb Shah; Hayat Bakshi Begum (m. 1607); Khurshid Bibi
- Issue: Abdullah Qutb Shah; Khadija Sultana (wife of Muhammad Adil Shah); Ibrahim Mirza; Sultan Quli Mirza; Mirza Kamal
- House: Qutb Shahi
- Dynasty: Qara Qoyunlu
- Father: Muhammad Amin
- Mother: Khanum Agha
- Religion: Shia Islam

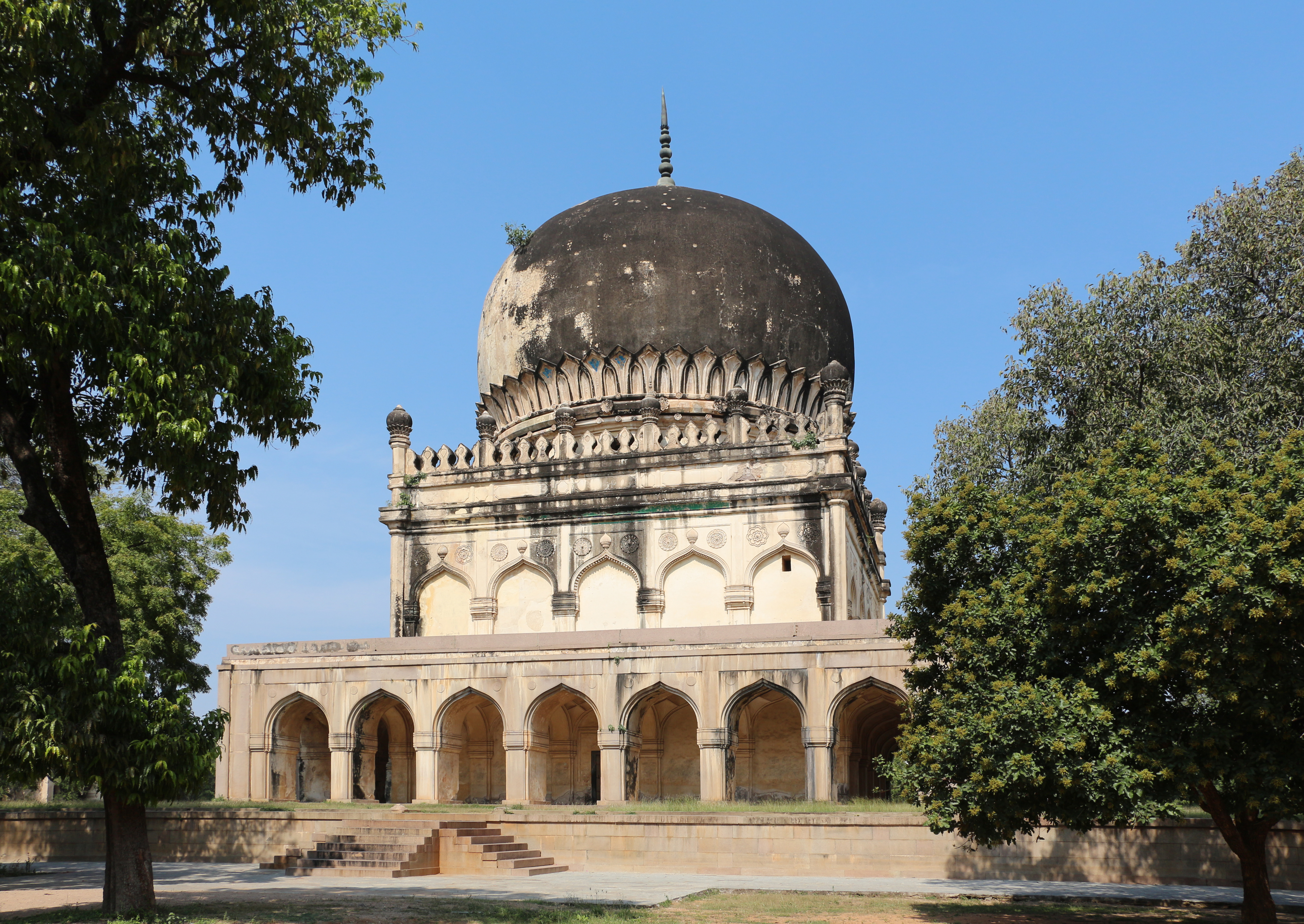
Mausoleum of Sultan Muhammad Qutb Shah in Hyderabad, India.

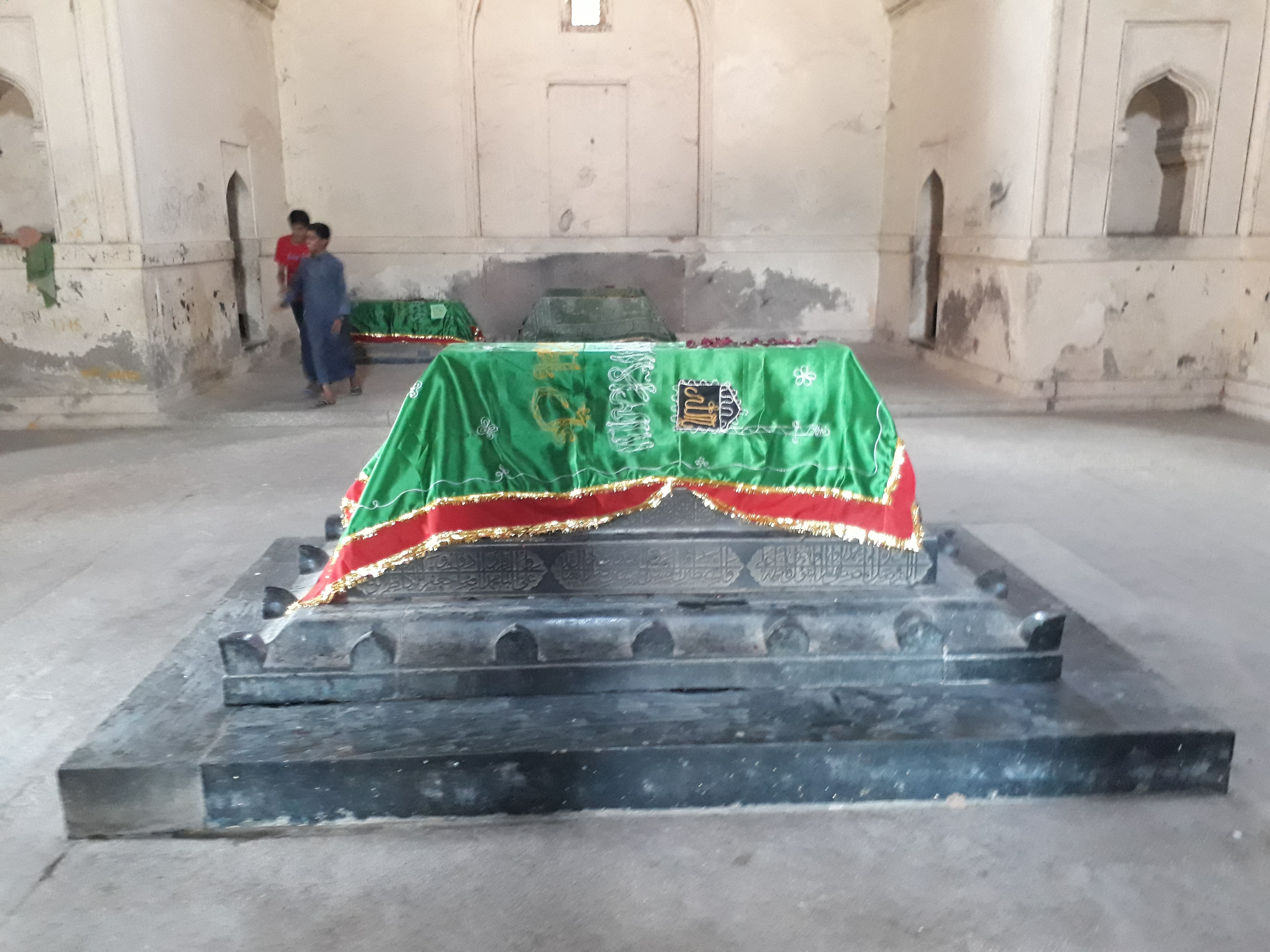
Muhammad Qutb Shah's tomb

Sultan Muhammad Qutb Shah (April 1593 – 9 February 1626) was the sixth ruler of the kingdom of Golconda in southern India under the Qutb Shahi dynasty.

He ruled from 11 January 1612 until his death on 9 February 1626. He was the nephew and son-in-law of Muhammad Quli Qutb Shah, having married Muhammad's only daughter Hayat Bakshi Begum in 1607.

The first Qutb Shahi history was compiled during his reign known as the Tarikh-i Qutb Shahi. His son, Abdullah Qutub Shah, later became the Shah of Golconda.

In 1620, as then ruler of Golconda, Sultan Muhammad Qutb Shah had decided to move his capital away from Golconda and Hyderabad. He selected a site about 6 miles (9.7 km) east of then Hyderabad, what is today Saroornagar. The fort was named after himself and called as Sultan Nagar Fort. The construction of this fort was abandoned by his wife Hayat Bakshi Begum who considered his sudden death in 1626 as a bad omen.

The Aga Khan Trust for Culture is carrying out the conservation effort on the sprawling necropolis in collaboration with Department of Archaeology and Museums, Telangana. After he died his sons migrated to different areas. Mostly the next king would be his first son, who migrated to Subcontinent, place now known as Pakistan. He refused to rule but could take back the king throne any time as the value and authorities. And he also died and the first sons could be the ruler and until now. The lastly researched one was Noor Muhammad .

== Sources ==
- Sharma, Sunil (2020). "Forging a Canon of Dakhni Literature: Translations and Retellings from Persian". In Overton, Keelan (ed.). Iran and the Deccan: Persianate Art, Culture, and Talent in Circulation, 1400–1700. Indiana University Press. pp. 401–420. ISBN 978-0253048912.
- Zore, Syed Mohiuddin Qadri (1941). میر محمّد مومن: حیات اور کارنامے [Mir Muhammad Muʼmin: Life and Achievements]. Hyderabad: Aazam Steam Press.

Preceded by Muhammad Quli Qutb Shah	Qutb Shahi dynasty 1612-1626	Succeeded by Abdullah Qutb Shah
