= Khadija Sultana =

- Bari Sahib

Consort of the Adil Shahi Sultan
- Tenure: 1633 – 4 November 1656

Regent and mother of Ali Adil Shah II
- Reign: 1656 – late 1650s
- Born: 1600
- Died: 1665/1669; Bijapur, Sultanate of Bijapur
- Spouse: Mohammed Adil Shah
- Children: Ali Adil Shah II
Names
- Khadija Sultana Muhammad Qutb Shah
- Dynasty: Qutb Shahi (by birth); Adil Shahi (by marriage)
- Father: Muhammad Qutb Shah
- Religion: Islam

Khadija Sultana (1600 – died after 1665) was the regent of the Bijapur Sultanate between 1656 and 1661.

She was the daughter of Sultan Muhammad Qutb Shah, married to Mohammed Adil Shah, Sultan of Bijapur and possible mother of Ali Adil Shah II, and acted as the regent for him during his minority.

== Biography ==
Khadija Sultana was the daughter of Muhammad Qutb Shah of Golkonda (1593–1626) and an unknown mother. In 1633 she married Mohammed Adil Shah (1613–1656) who ruled as the Sultan of Bijapur from 1626 to 1656. She was of the highest rank among his wives holding the title Bari Sahiba or Bari Sahib. In late 1635 or early 1636, she played a key role in a palace coup in which a minister, Khawas Khan, was deposed.

Following her husband's death in 1656, she became regent of the Bijapur Sultanate for his son and heir Ali Adil Shah II who was still a minor. It is unknown whether he was Khadija's biological son or not. According to a contemporary English source, Ali was the son of Muhammad and one of his concubines. Rumors began circulating that he was illegitimate, which was taken as an excuse by the Mughal emperor to invade the Bijapur Sultanate. Khadija was allied with the Dutch company, and in 1659 sent troops to the company's attack on Goa. Her regency ended in 1661. During a pilgrimage to Mecca in 1661, she was transported on one of the Dutch company's ships. It was exceptional, not only because members of Indian dynasties often only used their own ships on their way to Mecca, but also because she, as a Muslim woman, travelled with non-Muslim men. She and her female staff were taken on board the boat between a corridor of screens, to a boat that was also equipped with a tent. It is unknown how much contact Khadija had with the Dutch staff on board, but a Dutch helmsman and an English sailor during the voyage converted to Islam and stopped when the ship docked in Mecca. This resulted in an international scandal, as this would have been due to Khadija. Even years later, Khadija denied any involvement.

Khadija returned in 1662 on an Indian ship back to Bijapur. She traveled in 1663 to Persia and the holy Shia sites of Iraq such as the city of Karbala. The traces of her cease in 1665.

Dutch translations of three of her letters to Dutch East India Company officials survive in the Company archives in Jakarta and The Hague. They seem to be all that is left of her writing. They are highly polished in the Persian letter writing tradition. We also have other indications of a rich intellectual life. The Dutch East India Company employee and travel writer Johan Nieuhof noted her intelligence as it appeared from her dictating letters in various languages. Moreover, two manuscript volumes in the National Museum in Delhi bear her seal and must therefore have been part of her library.

== In popular culture ==
=== Films and television ===
- In the 2026 Indian Marathi-language historical film Raja Shivaji, she is portrayed by Vidya Balan.
