= Abdullah Qutb Shah =

Sultan of Golconda from 1626 to 1672

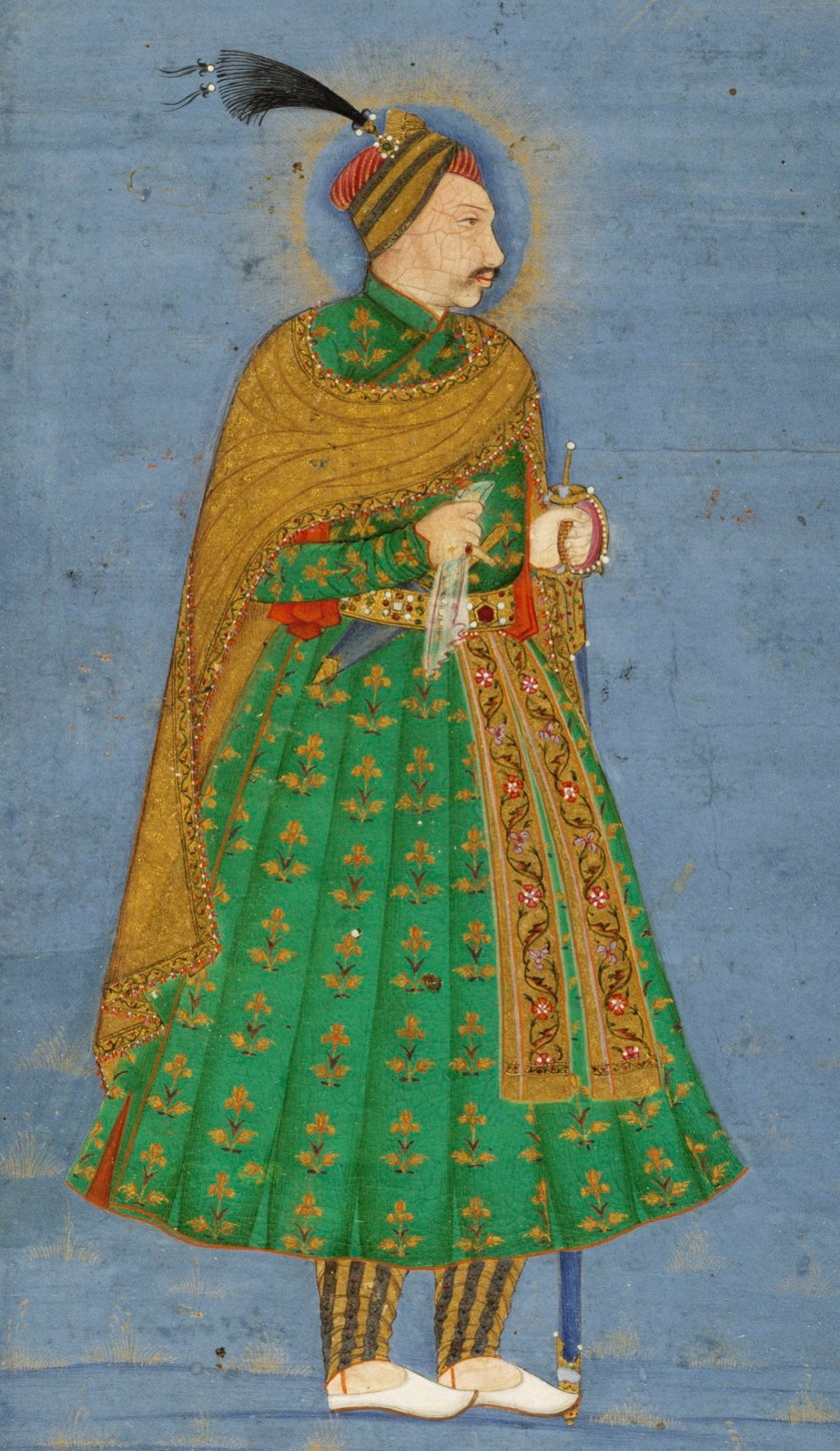
- Contemporary portrait of Abdullah Qutub Shah, dated 1650

7th Sultan of Golconda
- Reign: 9 February 1626 – 21 April 1672
- Predecessor: Sultan Muhammad Qutb Shah
- Successor: Abul Hasan Qutb Shah
- Born: 21 November 1614
- Died: 21 April 1672 (aged 57)
- Burial: Qutb Shahi tombs, Hyderabad
- Issue: 3 daughters
- House: Qutb Shahi
- Dynasty: Qara Qoyunlu
- Father: Sultan Muhammad Qutb Shah
- Mother: Hayat Bakshi Begum
- Religion: Shia Islam

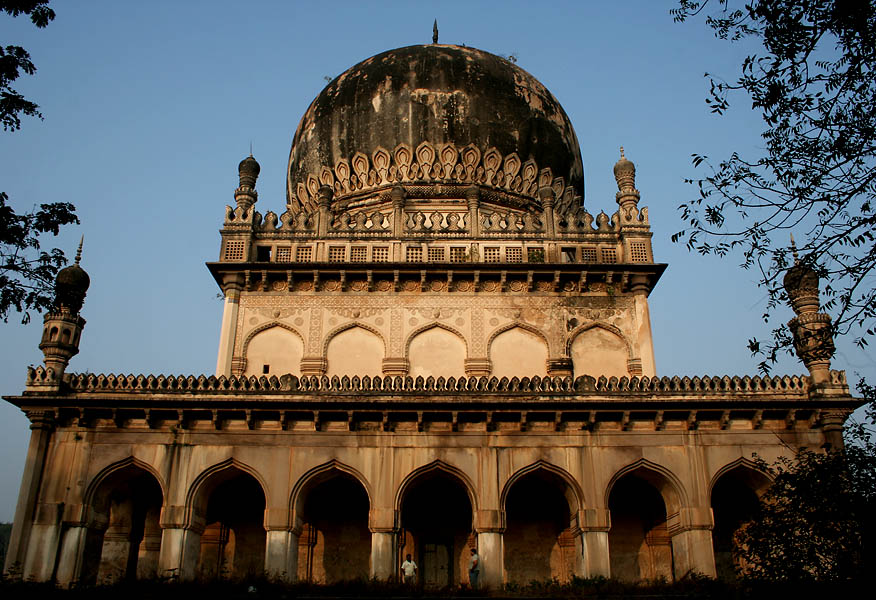
Tomb of Abdullah Qutb Shah in Hyderabad, India.

Abdullah Qutb Shah (21 November 1614 – 21 April 1672) was the seventh ruler of the kingdom of Golconda in southern India under the Qutb Shahi dynasty. He ruled from 1626 to 1672.

Abdullah, son of Sultan Muhammad Qutb Shah, was a polyglot, and a lover of poetry and music. He invited to his court and respected Kshetrayya, a famous lyric writer. Kshetrayya is known for his romantic poetry.

== Reign ==
His reign was full of sorrow and trouble. His only success was demolishing the decayed Vijayanagara Empire by capturing Vellore, last capital of it in 1646 with the help of his wazir Mir Jumla. Aurangzeb under the command from Shah Jahan took over Hyderabad by surprise and restricted Abdullah within the Golconda fort. Abdullah worked hard to negotiate reasonable terms of surrender but the Mughals forced him into accepting severe conditions. However, the severe terms were sweetened by a matrimonial alliance between the two families: Abdullah's second daughter, known as Padshah Bibi Sahiba, was married to Aurangzeb's eldest son, Muhammad Sultan Mirza. She was his first wife, so the chances of her progeny becoming Mughal emperor were great. However, it ultimately did not happen. Also, the rise of the Marathas under Shivaji in the Deccan region alarmed Golconda Sultan. Marathas captured all territories vested from Vijayanagara by Bijapur and Golconda. The victory of Marathas over the Bijapur Sultanate made Sultan Abul Hasan Tana Shah, the successor of Abdullah Qutb Shah create an alliance with Marathas, by offering them a large sum and sufficient military resources to fight the Mughals when needed, as the Mughals posed a threat to both Marathas and Deccan sultans. Thus eventually Golconda became a protectorate of the Maratha Empire. He was also quite interested in mathematics that although being a Muslim, he favoured many Europeans who excelled in mathematics.

This unhappy monarch died on 21 April 1672 and was succeeded by his son-in-law, Abul Hasan Qutb Shah.

== Cultural activities ==
Abdullah Qutb Shah was a supporter and writer of Deccani literature. In terms of belles-lettres, Persian seems to have been surpassed by Deccani since the 1620s. Abdullah Qutb Shah supported Iranian poets who wrote in Persian, such Ulfati Savaji, Salik Yazdi, and Mirza Razi Mashhadi, although they did not create any significant works like previous Persian poets, including Muhammad Zuhuri. During his reign, in 1634, the ancient Indian sex manual Koka Shastra was translated into Persian and named Lazzat-un-Nisa (Flavours of the Woman).

== Family ==
Abdullah had three daughters.

- eldest daughter: married the Mughal prince Muhammad Sultan.
- second daughter: married Nizam al-Din Ahmad al-Husayni, the chief minister of the Sultanate of Golconda from 1656 to 1672.
- Badshah Bibi: married Abul Hasan Qutb Shah.

== Sources ==
- Sharma, Sunil (2020). "Forging a Canon of Dakhni Literature: Translations and Retellings from Persian". In Overton, Keelan (ed.). Iran and the Deccan: Persianate Art, Culture, and Talent in Circulation, 1400–1700. Indiana University Press. pp. 401–420. ISBN 978-0253048912.

Preceded by Sultan Muhammad Qutb Shah	Qutb Shahi dynasty 1518–1687	Succeeded by Abul Hasan Qutb Shah
