= Muhammad Quli Qutb Shah =

Sultan of Golconda from 1580 to 1612

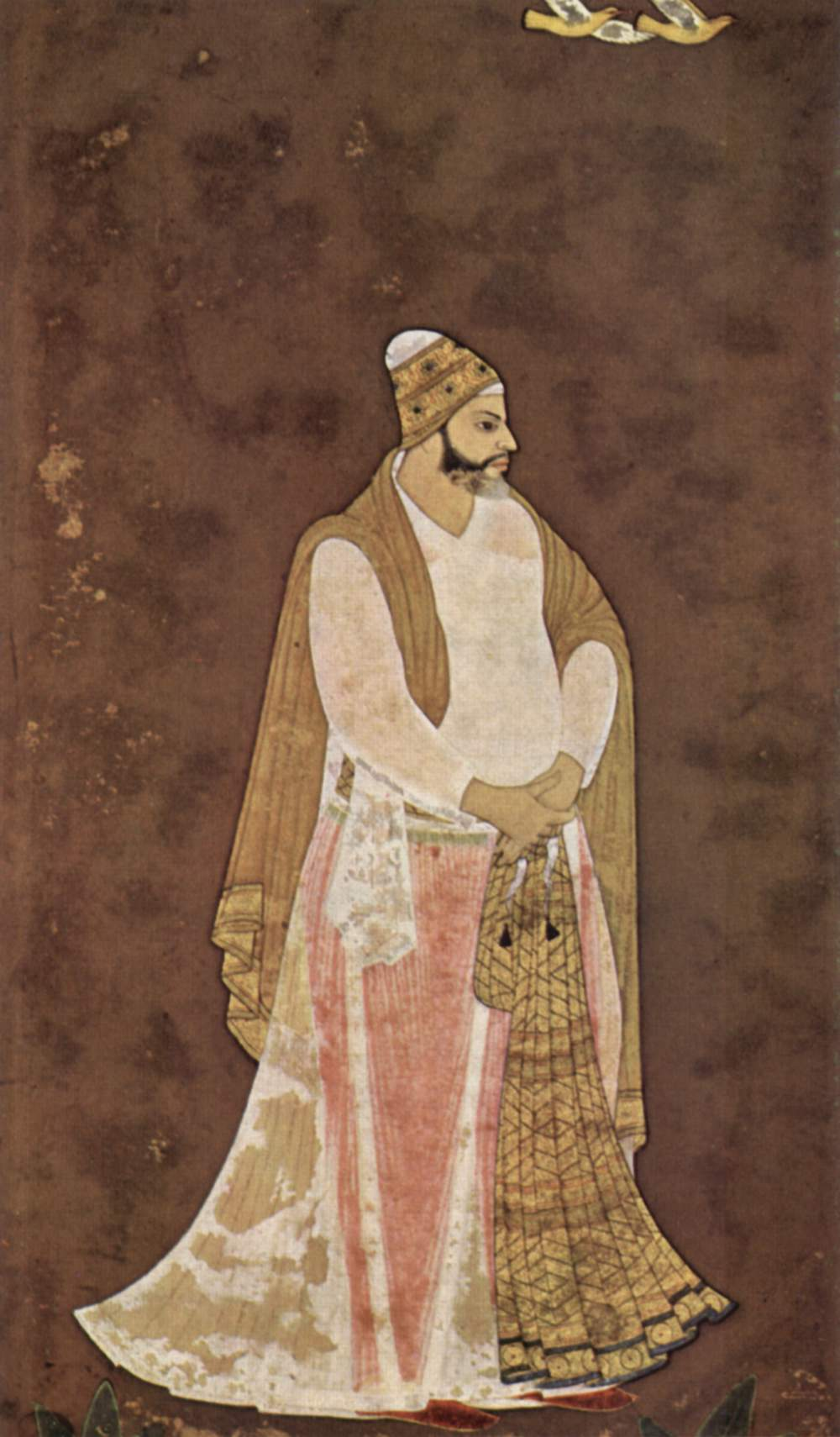

5th Sultan of Golconda
- Reign: 5 June 1580 – 11 January 1612
- Coronation: 1586
- Predecessor: Ibrahim Quli Qutb Shah
- Successor: Sultan Muhammad Qutb Shah
- Born: 4 April 1565; Golconda, Golconda Sultanate (now in Telangana, India)
- Died: 11 January 1612 (aged 46); Daulat Khan-e-Ali Palace, Hyderabad
- Issue: Hayat Bakshi Begum (wife of Sultan Muhammad Qutb Shah)
- House: Qutb Shahi
- Dynasty: Qara Qoyunlu
- Father: Ibrahim Quli Qutb Shah
- Mother: Ma Saheba
- Religion: Shia Islam

Muhammad Quli Qutb Shah (4 April 1565 – 11 January 1612) was the fifth sultan of the Sultanate of Golconda and founder of the city of Hyderabad. He built its architectural centrepiece, the Charminar. He was an able administrator and his reign is considered one of the high points of the Qutb Shahi dynasty. He ascended to the throne in 1580 at the age of 15 and ruled for 31 years.

== Early life and reign ==
Muhammad Quli Qutub Shah was the third son of Ibrahim Quli Qutb Shah Wali of the Sultanate of Golconda .

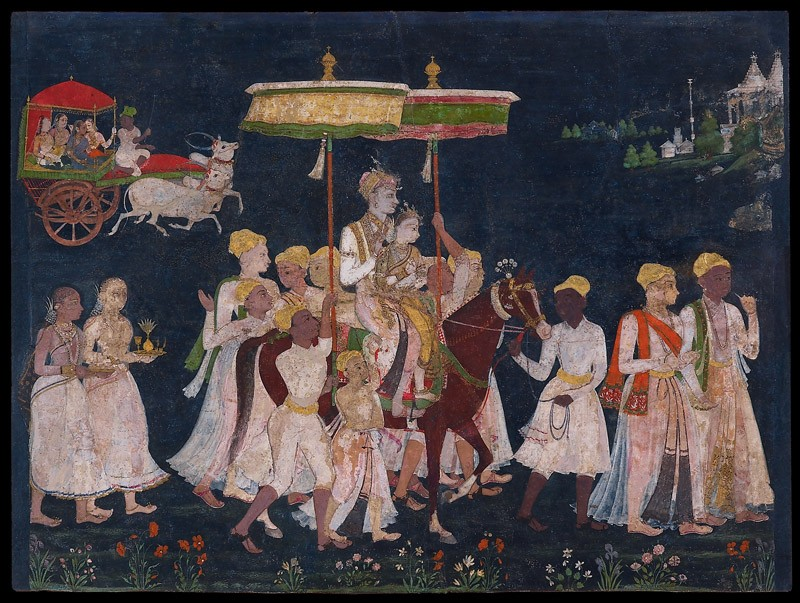
The Shah's wedding party with his bride.

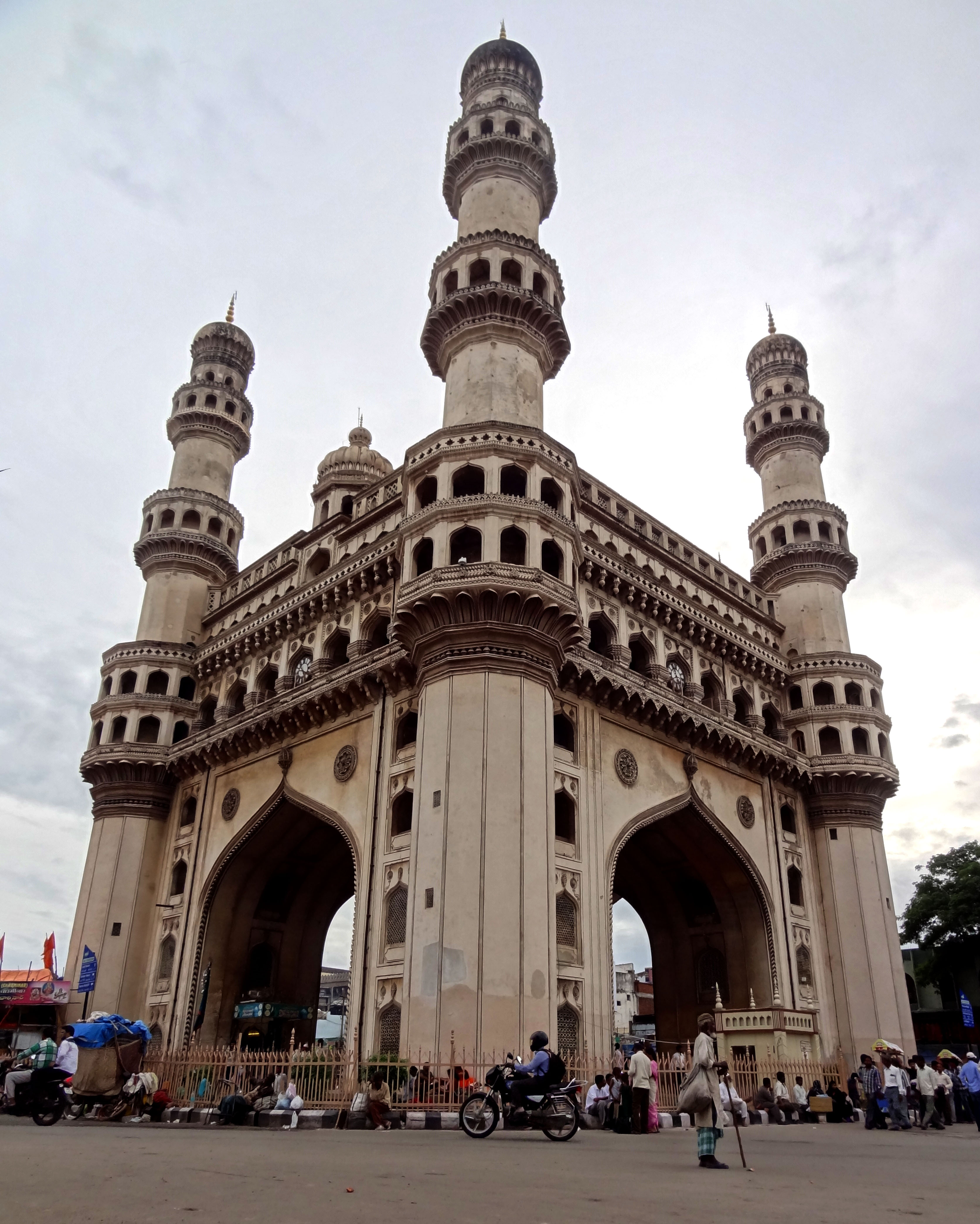
Charminar in Hyderabad was built by Quli Qutub Shah

Muhammad succeeded his father in the year 1580 at the age of 15. His rule lasted for 31 years. He faced minor rebellions on the eastern and western fronts of the sultanate during the initial years of his rule. He led the troops himself and defeated Ali Khan Loor and Yashwant Raj.

In 1592 further disturbance was created by Shah Saheb for ascending the throne. During this time he sent Aitbar Khan with a large troop and he defeated Shah Saheb. Amidst the chaos Muhammad Quli was still able to patronage art and establish the city of Hyderabad. His reign is considered the high point of the Sultanate of Golconda.

=== Founding of Hyderabad ===
From the time of his father Ibrahim Quli Qutb Shah, there was a high influx of populace into the city of Golconda, which led to over-crowding and unhygienic conditions. This created the need for an extension or new city. The construction of Hyderabad was initiated in 1591, on the southern bank of the River Musi. Before construction he prayed by reciting the following couplet for the welfare of the city: "Make my city full of people, like you keep the river full of fish."

There is a degree of folklore associated with selection of the land for the new city of Hyderabad. It is said that once the sultan was coming back from a hunt and he crossed the bridge across River Musi and arrived at the flat land which pleased him. However, Muhammad Quli must have been aware of the presence of this land and the story is a romanticised version.

The city was planned in a gridiron manner with the Charminar in the centre and other important palaces and administrative buildings along the surrounding axes. Other important buildings which were constructed in the following years such as Dar-ul-Shifa, Mecca Masjid, Badshahi Ashurkhana and several palaces which have since been demolished.

Muhammad Quli also planned several gardens throughout the city.

=== Patronage of art and literature ===
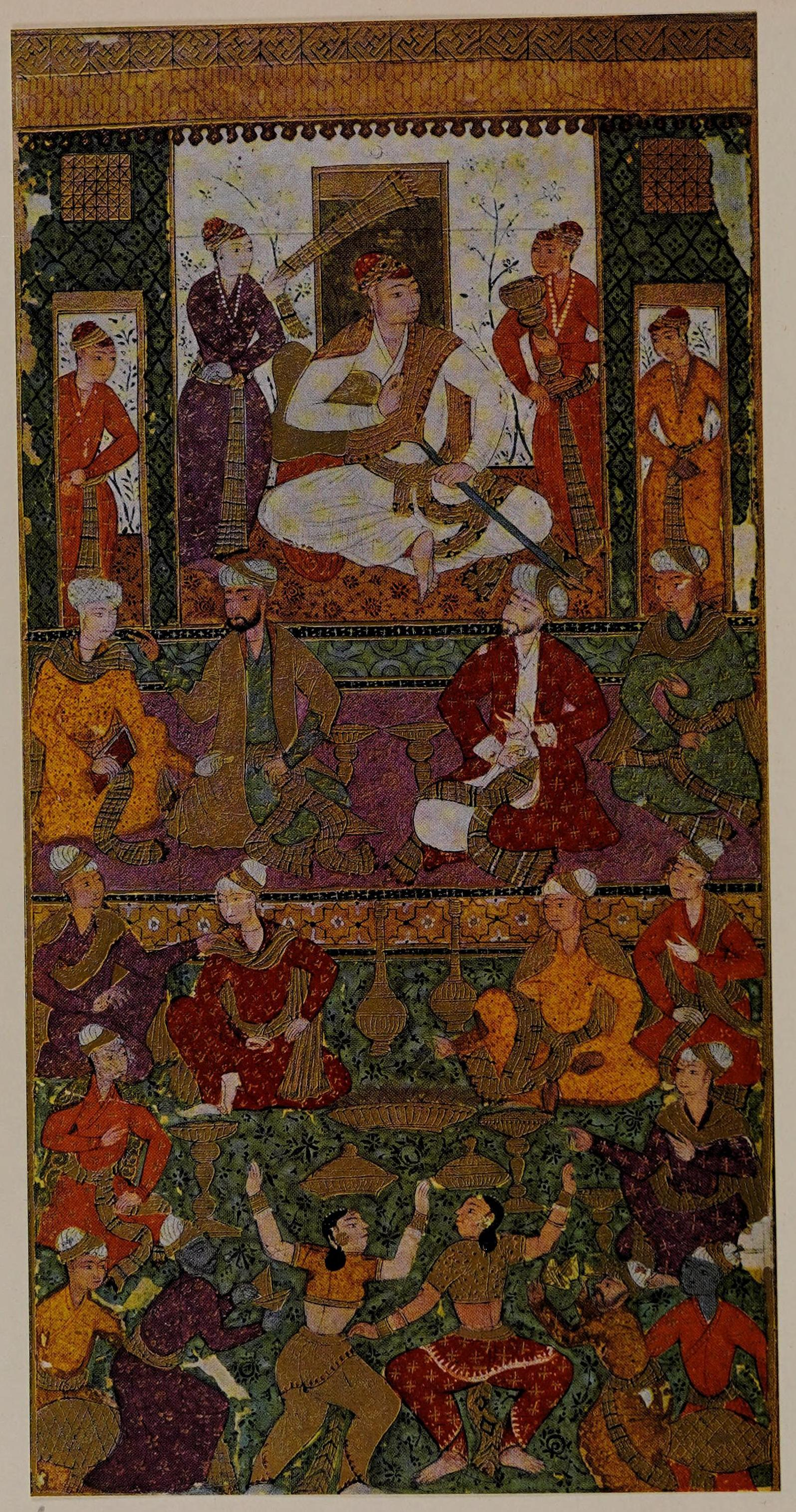
Dancing before Muhammad Quli Qutb Shah, Golconda, about 1590

Muhammad Quli was a patron of poetry, paintings, calligraphy and architecture. Major scripts used in this period are Nastaliq, Naksh, Kufi, Tughra and Sulus. A unique inscription is on Mecca Masjid in Nastaliq script, a script not known anywhere else in the Deccan region. Another inscription in the same mosque is a verse of the Quran carved in Naksh style.

Muhammad Quli was an accomplished poet and wrote his poetry in Persian, Telugu and Urdu. He is considered one of the first poets to write in the Deccani Urdu language. He wrote in a wide range of genres from religious to romantic to profane. He composed his verses in the Persian diwan style, and his poems consisted of verses relating to a single topic, gazal-i musalsal. His poetry has been compiled into a volume entitled Kulliyat-e-Quli Qutub Shah. Over half of its 1800 pages were gazals, while qasidas were present on one hundred pages, and the rest over 300 pages of matnawi and marsiyas. He was the first Saheb-e-dewan Urdu poet. But death came and took him. After he died his sons migrated to different areas.Mostly the next king would be his First son, who migrated to Subcontinent, place now known as Pakistan. He refused to rule but could take back the king throne any time as the value and authorities.And he also died and the first sons could be the ruler and until now. The lastly researched one was Noor Muhammad.

Physicians who wrote Persian language books on Unani medicine during his reign include Mir Momin (Ikhtiyarat-i Qutub Shahi), Shamsuddin Ali Husain al-Jurjani (Tazkirat-i Kahhalin), Hakim Shamsuddin bin Nuruddin (Zubdat-ul Hukama), Abdullah Tabib (Tibb-i Farid), Taqiuddin Muhammad bin Sadruddin Ali (Mizan-ul Tabai'), Nizamuddin Ahmad Gilani (Majmu'a-i Hakim-ul mulk), and Ismai'l bin Ibrahim Tabrezi (Tazkirat-ul Hukama).

Preceded by Ibrahim Quli Qutb Shah	Qutb Shahi dynasty 1580-1612	Succeeded by Sultan Muhammad Qutb Shah
