= Jama Mosque (disambiguation) =

A jama masjid is a congregational mosque.

Jama Mosque or Jama Masjid may also refer to:

- Jama Masjid, Delhi
- Jama Masjid, Fatehpur Sikri
- Jama Masjid, Bidar
- Jama Masjid, Hyderabad
- Jama Masjid, Lucknow
- Jama Masjid, Mandu
- Jama Masjid, Motijheel
- Jama Masjid, Nerul
- Jamia Masjid, Srinagar
- Jamia Masjid, Shopian
- Jama Mosque, Agra
- Jama Mosque, Delanipur
- Jama Mosque, Ahmedabad
- Jama Mosque, Champaner
- Jama Mosque, Dharamshala
- Jama Mosque, Golconda
- Jama Mosque, Ramgarh
- Jama Mosque, Bijapur
- Jama Mosque, Kalaburagi
- Jama Mosque, Aurangabad
- Jama Mosque, Erandol
- Jama Mosque, Mumbai
- Jama Mosque, Nagpur
- Jama Mosque, Furus
- Jama Mosque, Golconda
- Jama Mosque, Jaunpur
- Jama Mosque, Mathura

== See also ==
- List of grand mosques for a list of similar mosques
