= List of State Protected Monuments in Telangana =

This is a list of State Protected Monuments as officially reported by and available through the website of the Archaeological Survey of India in the state Telangana, India. The monument identifier is a combination of the abbreviation of the subdivision of the list (state, ASI circle) and the numbering as published on the website of the ASI.

In the undivided state of Andhra Pradesh; 500 State Protected Monuments were recognized by the ASI. In 2014 the western part of the state was separated into the State of Telangana, which has 323 State Protected Monuments as listed below .

Besides the State Protected Monuments, the List of Monuments of National Importance in this state has primary sites.

The below tables lists the monuments based on alphabetical order of their respective districts.

== Adilabad ==
SL. No.	Description	Location	Address	District	Coordinates	Image
S-AP-1	Hindu Temple			Adilabad		Upload Photo
S-AP-2	Hindu Temple			Adilabad		Upload Photo
S-AP-3	Hindu Temple			Adilabad		Upload Photo
S-AP-4	Prehistoric site			Adilabad		Upload Photo
S-AP-5	Fossils (Prehistoric)			Adilabad		Upload Photo
S-AP-6	Hindu Temple			Adilabad		Upload Photo
S-AP-7	Mosque			Adilabad		Upload Photo
S-AP-8	Hindu Temple			Adilabad		Upload Photo
S-AP-9	Prehistoric burials			Adilabad		Upload Photo
S-AP-10	Prehistoric burials			Adilabad		Upload Photo
S-AP-11	Prehistoric site			Adilabad		Upload Photo
S-AP-12	Prehistoric site			Adilabad		Upload Photo
S-AP-13	Prehistoric site			Adilabad		Upload Photo
S-AP-14	Prehistoric site			Adilabad		Upload Photo
S-AP-15	Hindu Temple			Adilabad		Upload Photo
S-AP-16	Fortifications			Adilabad		Upload Photo
S-AP-17	Prehistoric site			Adilabad		Upload Photo
S-AP-18	Gopalji's temple & other temple and inscriptions on the tank bund			Adilabad		Upload Photo
S-AP-19	Idgah and Muslim Dargah & old Jami Masjid			Adilabad		Upload Photo
S-AP-20	Saraswathi Temple			Adilabad		Upload Photo
S-AP-21	Prehistoric stone circles			Adilabad		Upload Photo
S-AP-22	Fort			Adilabad		Upload Photo
S-AP-23	Fort			Adilabad		Upload Photo
S-AP-24	Prehistoric site			Adilabad		Upload Photo
S-AP-25	Prehistoric burials			Adilabad		Upload Photo
S-AP-26	Hindu temple			Adilabad		Upload Photo
S-AP-27	Jami Masjid			Adilabad		Upload Photo
S-AP-28	Fortifications			Adilabad		Upload Photo
S-AP-29	Ibrahim Bagh			Adilabad		Upload Photo
S-AP-30	Prehistoric site			Adilabad		Upload Photo
S-AP-31	Prehistoric site			Adilabad		Upload Photo
S-AP-32	Prehistoric site			Adilabad		Upload Photo
S-AP-33	Hindu temple			Adilabad		Upload Photo
S-AP-34	Fortification and Idgah			Adilabad		Upload Photo
S-AP-35	Gandharikota			Adilabad		Upload Photo

== Hyderabad ==
SL. No.	Description	Location	Address	District	Coordinates	Image
S-AP-142	Mecca Masjid			Hyderabad		Mecca Masjid
S-AP-143	Badshahi Ashurkhana			Hyderabad		Badshahi Ashurkhana
S-AP-144	Old Gate of Dabirpura			Hyderabad		Old Gate of Dabirpura
S-AP-145	Mushirabad Mosque			Hyderabad		Upload Photo
S-AP-146	Toli Masjid			Hyderabad		Toli Masjid
S-AP-147	Gunfoundry			Hyderabad		Upload Photo
S-AP-148	Khazana Building			Hyderabad		Upload Photo
S-AP-149	Shamsheerkota			Hyderabad		Upload Photo
S-AP-150	Qutb Shahi Tombs			Hyderabad		Qutb Shahi Tombs
S-AP-151	Tara Mati's Baradari			Hyderabad		Tara Mati's Baradari
S-AP-152	Prema Mati's Mosque			Hyderabad		Upload Photo
S-AP-153	Akkanna's Sarai (Mahankali Maheswaram) (Maisaram)			Hyderabad		Upload Photo
S-AP-154	Shaikpet mosque and sarai			Hyderabad		Upload Photo
S-AP-155	Hakim's Tomb			Hyderabad		Upload Photo
S-AP-156	Mia Miskh's Mosque, Hamam and Sarai			Hyderabad		Upload Photo
S-AP-157	Khairat Khan's Tomb			Hyderabad		Khairat Khan's Tomb
S-AP-158	Khairati Begum's Tomb and Mosque			Hyderabad		Khairati Begum's Tomb and Mosque
S-AP-159	Khairati Begum's Tomb and Mosque			Hyderabad		Khairati Begum's Tomb and Mosque
S-AP-160	Monds Raymond's Obelisk			Hyderabad		Monds Raymond's Obelisk
S-AP-161	Mir Alam Tank Cairns			Hyderabad		Upload Photo
S-AP-162	Hashmatpet Cairns			Hyderabad		Upload Photo
S-AP-163	Maula Ali Cairns and Cromlechs			Hyderabad		Upload Photo
S-AP-164	Boinapalli Cairns			Hyderabad		Upload Photo
S-AP-165	Lingampalli Cairns			Hyderabad		Upload Photo
S-AP-166	Kukatpalli Cairns			Hyderabad		Upload Photo
S-AP-167	Gurramguda Cairns			Hyderabad		Upload Photo
S-AP-168	Begumpet (Neolithic site)			Hyderabad		Upload Photo
S-AP-169	Akkanna Madanna's Temple (Kukatpalli)			Hyderabad		Upload Photo
S-AP-170	Grave and Mosque of Princes, Hussaina Begum, Abdullah Qutub Shah's daughter			Hyderabad		Upload Photo
S-AP-171	Sculptures at Tilak Road			Hyderabad		Upload Photo
S-AP-172	Daraga Hazarat Syed Shah Raziuddin			Hyderabad		Upload Photo
S-AP-173	Megalithic Burials			Hyderabad		Upload Photo
S-AP-174	Prehistoric Burials			Hyderabad		Prehistoric Burials
S-AP-175	Artifacts			Hyderabad		Artifacts
S-AP-176	Megalithic circle			Hyderabad		Megalithic circle
S-AP-177	Fortification and Baradari			Hyderabad		Fortification and Baradari
S-AP-178	Armenian cemetery			Hyderabad		Upload Photo
S-AP-179	Ancient gateway called "Puranapul"			Hyderabad		Ancient gateway called "Puranapul"
S-AP-180	Kulsum Begum Mosque			Hyderabad		Upload Photo
S-AP-181	Shams-Ul-Umra Tombs (Paigah Tombs)			Hyderabad		Shams-Ul-Umra Tombs (Paigah Tombs)
S-AP-182	Sir Ronald Ross Building (Near Begumpet Airport)			Hyderabad		Upload Photo
S-AP-183	Dargah Hazratha Saidani-Ma-Saheba			Hyderabad		Upload Photo

== K ==
SL. No.	Description	Location	Address	District	Coordinates	Image
S-AP-184	Prehistoric site			Karimnagar		Upload Photo
S-AP-185	Chalukyan temple (Siva temple) (Endowments Dept)			Karimnagar		Upload Photo
S-AP-186	Hindu temple (Endowments Dept)			Karimnagar		Upload Photo
S-AP-187	Temples & sculptures (Endowments Dept)			Karimnagar		Upload Photo
S-AP-188	Old Hindu Fort (Bajgar)			Karimnagar		Upload Photo
S-AP-189	Malang Shah's Dargah			Karimnagar		Upload Photo
S-AP-190	Hill Fort			Karimnagar		Upload Photo
S-AP-191	Temple & inscriptions (Endowments Dept)			Karimnagar		Upload Photo
S-AP-192	Temple & sculptures (Endowments Dept)			Karimnagar		Upload Photo
S-AP-193	Prehistoric site			Karimnagar		Upload Photo
S-AP-194	Prehistoric site			Karimnagar		Upload Photo
S-AP-195	Prehistoric site			Karimnagar		Upload Photo
S-AP-196	Fort and Mosque			Karimnagar		Upload Photo
S-AP-197	Pratapagiri Fort			Karimnagar		Upload Photo
S-AP-198	Temples (Endowments Dept) i) Sileshwara gudi ii) Sivangudi iii) Mahalakshmigudi iv) Onkaliswara gudi v) Lakshminarayana gudi Gauthameswar temple			Karimnagar		Upload Photo
S-AP-199	Ramgir Fort			Karimnagar		Ramgir Fort
S-AP-200	Hindu temple			Karimnagar		Upload Photo
S-AP-201	Temples and sculptures column			Karimnagar		Upload Photo
S-AP-202	Temples and sculptures			Karimnagar		Upload Photo
S-AP-203	An Old Temple			Karimnagar		Upload Photo
S-AP-204	Anantgiri Fort			Karimnagar		Upload Photo
S-AP-205	Two temples (Endowments Dept)			Karimnagar		Upload Photo
S-AP-206	Temples and inscriptions (Endowments Dept)			Karimnagar		Upload Photo
S-AP-207	Dargah of Bagsawar (Endowments Dept)			Karimnagar		Upload Photo
S-AP-208	Mosque in Fort, Hill Fort Jami Masjid and Idgah			Karimnagar		Mosque in Fort, Hill Fort Jami Masjid and Idgah
S-AP-209	Sri Kaleswaraswamy temple			Karimnagar		Upload Photo
S-AP-210	Gathemaswara temple			Karimnagar		Upload Photo
S-AP-211	Ancient fort			Karimnagar		Upload Photo
S-AP-212	Fort			Karimnagar		Upload Photo
S-AP-213	Laxmi Narasimhaswamy temple			Karimnagar		Upload Photo
S-AP-214	Siva temple			Karimnagar		Upload Photo
S-AP-215	Ancient Megalithic burials site			Karimnagar		Upload Photo
S-AP-216	Sri Kesavanadha Pancha Mukha Lingeswara Swamy temple			Karimnagar		Upload Photo
S-AP-217	Buddhist and Andhra sites			Khammam		Upload Photo
S-AP-218	Hindu Fort			Khammam		Hindu Fort
S-AP-219	Stone Circle			Khammam		Upload Photo
S-AP-220	Stone Circle			Khammam		Upload Photo
S-AP-221	Stone Circle			Khammam		Upload Photo
S-AP-222	Cairns and Menhirs			Khammam		Upload Photo
S-AP-223	Cairns			Khammam		Upload Photo
S-AP-224	Flakes Cores and other stone implements			Khammam		Upload Photo
S-AP-225	Stone Circle			Khammam		Upload Photo
S-AP-226	Megalithic burials			Khammam		Upload Photo
S-AP-227	Temples Ganapeswapuram, Mukkanteswaralayam			Khammam		Upload Photo
S-AP-228	Menhirs and Alignments			Khammam		Upload Photo
S-AP-229	Prehistoric Cist burials complex			Khammam		Upload Photo
S-AP-230	Old temple called ‘Sivalayam'			Khammam		Upload Photo

== M ==
SL. No.	Description	Location	Address	District	Coordinates	Image
S-AP-258	Hindu Temple and Inscriptions			Mahabubnagar		Upload Photo
S-AP-259	Jami Masjid			Mahabubnagar		Upload Photo
S-AP-260	Old Hindu Fortress			Mahabubnagar		Upload Photo
S-AP-261	Hindu temple and inscriptions			Mahabubnagar		Upload Photo
S-AP-262	Hindu temples and sculptures			Mahabubnagar		Upload Photo
S-AP-263	Uma Maheshwara temple			Mahabubnagar		Upload Photo
S-AP-264	Old Hindu Fort			Mahabubnagar		Upload Photo
S-AP-265	Muslim Fort and Shah Ali's Dargah			Mahabubnagar		Upload Photo
S-AP-266	Old Hindu temples			Mahabubnagar		Upload Photo
S-AP-267	Hindu temples and inscriptions			Mahabubnagar		Upload Photo
S-AP-268	Old Hindu Fortress			Mahabubnagar		Upload Photo
S-AP-269	Old Hindu Fort and inscriptions			Mahabubnagar		Upload Photo
S-AP-270	Old Hindu temple			Mahabubnagar		Upload Photo
S-AP-271	Old Hindu temple			Mahabubnagar		Upload Photo
S-AP-272	Old Hindu Fort and Inscriptions			Mahabubnagar		Upload Photo
S-AP-273	Cairns			Mahabubnagar		Upload Photo
S-AP-274	Dolmens			Mahabubnagar		Upload Photo
S-AP-275	Cairns			Mahabubnagar		Upload Photo
S-AP-276	Stone Circles prehistoric burials			Mahabubnagar		Upload Photo
S-AP-277	Cairns			Mahabubnagar		Upload Photo
S-AP-278	Jami Masjid			Mahabubnagar		Upload Photo
S-AP-279	Prehistoric stone circle and other remains			Mahabubnagar		Upload Photo
S-AP-280	Stone circles			Mahabubnagar		Upload Photo
S-AP-281	Hindu temple & inscriptions (Kannada & Telugu)			Mahabubnagar		Upload Photo
S-AP-282	Telugu Inscription			Mahabubnagar		Upload Photo
S-AP-283	Idgah of Hazrat Syed Abdur Rahman Chisti			Mahabubnagar		Upload Photo
S-AP-284	Fort Ashur Khana and inscription of Ibrahim Qutub Shah			Mahabubnagar		Upload Photo
S-AP-285	Prehistoric burials Avenues and Cairns			Mahabubnagar		Upload Photo
S-AP-286	Old Mosque			Mahabubnagar		Upload Photo
S-AP-287	Cairns			Mahabubnagar		Upload Photo
S-AP-288	Stone circles – prehistoric burials			Mahabubnagar		Upload Photo
S-AP-289	Prehistoric burials, stone circles & Menhirs			Mahabubnagar		Upload Photo
S-AP-290	Hindu Temple			Mahabubnagar		Upload Photo
S-AP-291	Old Hindu temple			Mahabubnagar		Upload Photo
S-AP-292	Old Hindu temple			Mahabubnagar		Upload Photo
S-AP-293	Ancient Monuments & Remains (Buddhist)			Mahabubnagar		Upload Photo
S-AP-294	Old tower			Mahabubnagar		Upload Photo
S-AP-295	Stone circle			Mahabubnagar		Upload Photo
S-AP-296	Jami Masjid & Persian inscription of Mohd. Bin Humayun Shah			Mahabubnagar		Upload Photo
S-AP-297	Stone circle prehistoric graves			Mahabubnagar		Upload Photo
S-AP-298	Stone circle			Mahabubnagar		Upload Photo
S-AP-299	Old Hindu temple			Mahabubnagar		Upload Photo
S-AP-300	Cairns			Mahabubnagar		Upload Photo
S-AP-301	Jami Masjid			Mahabubnagar		Upload Photo
S-AP-302	Old temple			Mahabubnagar		Upload Photo
S-AP-303	Old Hindu fort and hill			Mahabubnagar		Upload Photo
S-AP-304	Gudem Muke Gudulu			Mahabubnagar		Upload Photo
S-AP-305	Temple complex near District Museum, Pillalamarri			Mahabubnagar		Upload Photo
S-AP-306	Dolmens			Mahabubnagar		Upload Photo
S-AP-307	Kumbeswara Swamy temple			Mahabubnagar		Upload Photo
S-AP-308	Sri Channakeswa Swamy temple			Mahabubnagar		Upload Photo
S-AP-309	Megalithic site			Mahabubnagar		Upload Photo
S-AP-310	Megalithic site			Mahabubnagar		Upload Photo
S-AP-311	Megalithic site			Mahabubnagar		Upload Photo
S-AP-312	Ancient mud fort Jaladurg called as Nizamkonda			Mahabubnagar		Upload Photo
S-AP-313	Hill fort			Medak		Hill fort
S-AP-314	Mubarak Manal			Medak		Upload Photo
S-AP-315	Qutub Shahi Mosque; Arab Khan's Mosque and Inscriptions			Medak		Upload Photo
S-AP-316	Inscriptions (Canarese)			Medak		Upload Photo
S-AP-317	Hindu temples and inscriptions			Medak		Upload Photo
S-AP-318	Stone circles			Medak		Upload Photo
S-AP-319	Prehistoric burials			Medak		Upload Photo
S-AP-320	Remains of Hindu temples etc.			Medak		Upload Photo
S-AP-321	Remains of Jaina temples, sculptures & inscriptions			Medak		Upload Photo
S-AP-322	Ruined tombs			Medak		Upload Photo
S-AP-323	Prehistoric burials			Medak		Upload Photo
S-AP-324	Prehistoric burials			Medak		Upload Photo
S-AP-325	Prehistoric cairns			Medak		Upload Photo
S-AP-326	Old Mosque			Medak		Upload Photo
S-AP-327	Qutub Shahi Mosque			Medak		Upload Photo
S-AP-328	Prehistoric cairns			Medak		Upload Photo
S-AP-329	Rakasigudi			Medak		Upload Photo
S-AP-330	Rakasigudi			Medak		Upload Photo
S-AP-331	Rakasigudi			Medak		Upload Photo
S-AP-332	Rakasigudi			Medak		Upload Photo
S-AP-333	Siva Temple			Medak		Upload Photo
S-AP-334	Sri Ramalingeswara Swamy temple			Medak		Upload Photo
S-AP-335	Subedar Office Building			Medak		Upload Photo
S-AP-336	Kasivisweswaralayam (consisting of Venugopala, Anantapadmanabha and Kasivisweswara)			Medak		Upload Photo
S-AP-337	The ancient temple with prehistoric rock shelters containing bruisings and Animal figures in Chowdannagutta and Gangiavula gattu			Medak		Upload Photo

== N ==
SL. No.	Description	Location	Address	District	Coordinates	Image
S-AP-338	Monolithic Pillar			Nalgonda		Upload Photo
S-AP-339	Fort			Nalgonda		Upload Photo
S-AP-340	Old Dams: Telugu and Persian inscriptions			Nalgonda		Upload Photo
S-AP-341	Hindu Temples			Nalgonda		Upload Photo
S-AP-342	Hindu Temples			Nalgonda		Upload Photo
S-AP-343	Stone circles			Nalgonda		Upload Photo
S-AP-344	Stone circles			Nalgonda		Upload Photo
S-AP-345	Stone circles			Nalgonda		Upload Photo
S-AP-346	Cairns and Menhirs			Nalgonda		Upload Photo
S-AP-347	Cairns and Menhirs			Nalgonda		Upload Photo
S-AP-348	Stone circles			Nalgonda		Upload Photo
S-AP-349	Cairns			Nalgonda		Upload Photo
S-AP-350	Cairns			Nalgonda		Upload Photo
S-AP-351	Cairns			Nalgonda		Upload Photo
S-AP-352	Fort			Nalgonda		Upload Photo
S-AP-353	Fortification			Nalgonda		Upload Photo
S-AP-354	Cairns			Nalgonda		Upload Photo
S-AP-355	Hill Fort			Nalgonda		Hill Fort
S-AP-356	Inscriptions in Fort			Nalgonda		Upload Photo
S-AP-357	Dargah of Hazrat Zamal Bahar			Nalgonda		Upload Photo
S-AP-358	Buddhist and Andhra site			Nalgonda		Upload Photo
S-AP-359	Stone circles			Nalgonda		Upload Photo
S-AP-360	Fort			Nalgonda		Upload Photo
S-AP-361	Avenues			Nalgonda		Upload Photo
S-AP-362	Buddhist and Andhra site			Nalgonda		Upload Photo
S-AP-363	Buddhist and Andhra site			Nalgonda		Upload Photo
S-AP-364	Fort			Nalgonda		Upload Photo
S-AP-365	Stone circles			Nalgonda		Upload Photo
S-AP-366	Cairns			Nalgonda		Upload Photo
S-AP-367	Stone circles			Nalgonda		Upload Photo
S-AP-368	Stone circles			Nalgonda		Upload Photo
S-AP-369	Stone circles			Nalgonda		Upload Photo
S-AP-370	Cairns			Nalgonda		Upload Photo
S-AP-371	Cairns			Nalgonda		Upload Photo
S-AP-372	Muslim Mosque Dargah and fort			Nalgonda		Upload Photo
S-AP-373	Hindu temples and inscriptions			Nalgonda		Hindu temples and inscriptions
S-AP-374	Temples, Frescoes and inscriptions			Nalgonda		Temples, Frescoes and inscriptions More images
S-AP-375	Fortifications			Nalgonda		Upload Photo
S-AP-376	Buddhist and Andhra sites			Nalgonda		Upload Photo
S-AP-377	Dolmens, Cairns, Venues			Nalgonda		Upload Photo
S-AP-378	Andhra and Buddhist sites			Nalgonda		Upload Photo
S-AP-379	Andhra and Buddhist sites			Nalgonda		Upload Photo
S-AP-380	Buddhist and Andhra sites			Nalgonda		Upload Photo
S-AP-381	Buddhist and Andhra sites			Nalgonda		Upload Photo
S-AP-382	Hindu temple with a natural cavern at the back			Nalgonda		Upload Photo
S-AP-383	Cairns and Cromlechs			Nalgonda		Upload Photo
S-AP-384	Cairns			Nalgonda		Upload Photo
S-AP-385	Cairns & Cromleches			Nalgonda		Upload Photo
S-AP-386	Cairns & Cromleches			Nalgonda		Upload Photo
S-AP-387	Stone circles			Nalgonda		Upload Photo
S-AP-388	Avenues			Nalgonda		Upload Photo
S-AP-389	Stone circles			Nalgonda		Upload Photo
S-AP-390	Stone circles			Nalgonda		Upload Photo
S-AP-391	Avenues			Nalgonda		Upload Photo
S-AP-392	Cairns			Nalgonda		Upload Photo
S-AP-393	Cairns			Nalgonda		Upload Photo
S-AP-394	Cairn circles			Nalgonda		Upload Photo
S-AP-395	Menhir			Nalgonda		Upload Photo
S-AP-396	Sri Siva Temple ‘Basavanna Temple'			Nalgonda		Upload Photo
S-AP-405	Old tombs			Nizamabad		Upload Photo
S-AP-406	Jains sculptures			Nizamabad		Upload Photo
S-AP-407	Fort			Nizamabad		Upload Photo
S-AP-408	Temple			Nizamabad		Upload Photo
S-AP-409	Hindu Temple			Nizamabad		Upload Photo
S-AP-410	Deval Mosque and Rashtrakuta (Canara-Telugu) inscriptions			Nizamabad		Upload Photo
S-AP-411	Stone circle			Nizamabad		Upload Photo
S-AP-412	Fort			Nizamabad		Upload Photo
S-AP-413	Cairns			Nizamabad		Upload Photo
S-AP-414	Stone circles			Nizamabad		Upload Photo
S-AP-415	Iklas Khan's Mosque			Nizamabad		Upload Photo
S-AP-416	Tomb of Behlul Shah Wali			Nizamabad		Upload Photo
S-AP-417	Mosque of Khooni Khan			Nizamabad		Upload Photo
S-AP-418	Dargah of Shah Zia-Ul-Haq			Nizamabad		Upload Photo
S-AP-419	Mahadeva temple			Nizamabad		Upload Photo
S-AP-420	Hill fort and Persian inscriptions			Nizamabad		Upload Photo
S-AP-421	Fortification walls including Moatbed and Mahadev temple			Nizamabad		Upload Photo
S-AP-422	Siva Temple(Trilingeswaralayam)			Nizamabad		Upload Photo
S-AP-423	Sri Raja Rajeswara temple			Nizamabad		Upload Photo

== R ==
SL. No.	Description	Location	Address	District	Coordinates	Image
S-AP-444	Keesaragutta site			Rangareddy		Keesaragutta site
S-AP-445	Qutub Shahi Mosque			Rangareddy		Upload Photo
S-AP-446	Hayat Bakshi Begum Mosque			Rangareddy		Hayat Bakshi Begum Mosque
S-AP-447	Sivalayam			Rangareddy		Upload Photo

== W ==
SL. No.	Description	Location	Address	District	Coordinates	Image
S-AP-466	Shambunigudi temple			Warangal		Upload Photo
S-AP-467	Stone circles			Warangal		Stone circles
S-AP-468	Cairns			Warangal		Upload Photo
S-AP-469	Temple & inscriptions			Warangal		Temple & inscriptions
S-AP-470	Fort			Warangal		Fort
S-AP-471	Fort			Warangal		Fort
S-AP-472	Fort			Warangal		Upload Photo
S-AP-473	Cromlechs			Warangal		Upload Photo
S-AP-474	Cairns			Warangal		Upload Photo
S-AP-475	Stone circles			Warangal		Upload Photo
S-AP-476	Lake & Inscriptions			Warangal		Upload Photo
S-AP-477	Hindu temples inscriptions and sculptures			Warangal		Hindu temples inscriptions and sculptures
S-AP-478	Temples and sculptures			Warangal		Temples and sculptures
S-AP-479	Hindu temples and sculptures			Warangal		Upload Photo
S-AP-480	Flakes, cores and Deolithis			Warangal		Upload Photo
S-AP-481	Dolmens			Warangal		Upload Photo
S-AP-482	Cairns			Warangal		Upload Photo
S-AP-483	Cairns			Warangal		Upload Photo
S-AP-484	Flakes, cores and Deolithis			Warangal		Upload Photo
S-AP-485	Tukne inscriptions			Warangal		Upload Photo
S-AP-486	Siva temple			Warangal		Siva temple
S-AP-487	Panchayatna temple			Warangal		Upload Photo
S-AP-488	Reddygudi temple			Warangal		Upload Photo
S-AP-489	Megalithic burials			Warangal		Upload Photo
S-AP-490	Angadiveerannagudi			Warangal		Upload Photo
S-AP-491	Two inscriptions			Warangal		Upload Photo
S-AP-492	Siva temple			Warangal		Siva temple
S-AP-493	Fort of Servay Papa Rayudu (Soldier) locally known as quilla shapur			Warangal		Upload Photo
S-AP-494	Siva temple			Warangal		Upload Photo
