= List of mosques in Telangana =

Prominent mosques in Telangana, India

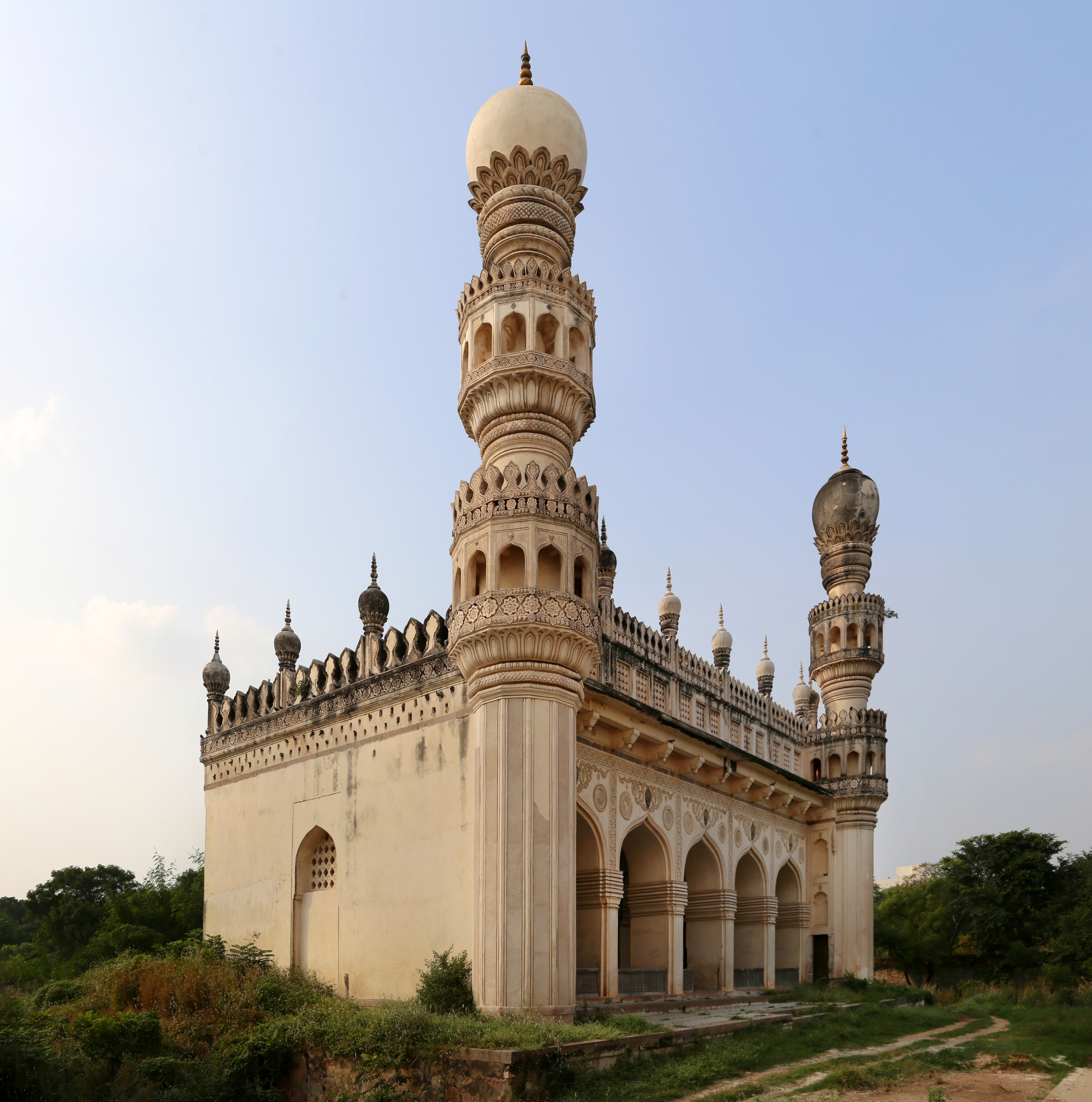
Mosque at the Qutb Shahi tombs

This is a list of mosques in Telangana, that date from the 14th century. The earliest mosques in the region were built during the short-lived reign of the Delhi Sultanate, established after the defeat of the Kakatiya kingdom. These were often built with the ruins of desecrated Hindu temples, such as the Deval Masjid.

The majority of mosques are located in the Telangana capital city of Hyderabad.

== History ==
In 1518, Quli Qutb-ul-Mulk established the Qutb Shahi dynasty and rebuilt the fortress of Golconda. He also commissioned the Jama Mosque, which is the oldest surviving mosque in Hyderabad. Successive Qutb Shahi rulers would patronize the construction of several elaborate mosques built in the distinctive style that evolved during this period.

Muhammad Quli Qutb Shah established the city of Hyderabad in 1591, which would grow to encompass Golconda. He built the Charminar as the centerpiece of the city, as well as the Mecca Masjid, which is the largest mosque in the city with a capacity to accommodate 10,000 worshippers. The 17th-century Toli Masjid shows Hindu influences in its ornamentation. Other mosques dating back to the Qutb Shahi period include the mosques at Khairatabad, Hayatnagar, and Musheerabad.

After a brief Mughal rule, the Nizams of Hyderabad ruled modern-day Telangana between 1724 and 1948. Some of the mosques from this period, such as the Afzal Gunj mosque and Chowk Ke Masjid were reminiscent of the Qutb Shahi style. Later mosques showed more cosmopolitan influences, such as the Spanish Mosque, drawing from Moorish architecture.

== List of mosques ==
Mosques
Name	Image	Coordinates	Location	Established	Ref(s)
Afzal Gunj Masjid	A black and white image of a mosque with three arched entrances, flanked by two minarets on the sides.	17°22′27.6″N 78°28′31.6″E	Hyderabad	1866	
Azizia Masjid	A white multi-storied building with one minaret, with a busy street in the foreground.	17°23′45.5″N 78°26′33.5″E	Hyderabad	1966	
Chowk Ke Masjid		17°21′42.7″N 78°28′12.8″E	Hyderabad	1817	
Hayat Bakshi Mosque, Hayathnagar	A mosque with five arched entrances, flanked by two minarets. The facade is white, and the minarets are brown. In the foreground are steps leading up to the mosque, with shrubs on either side.	17°19′34.1″N 78°35′56.4″E	Hyderabad	17th century	
Hayat Bakshi Mosque, Qutb Shahi tombs	A very richly decorated mosque building, with five arched entrances, flanked by two minarets. The building is situated within a garden, and some flowering shrubs are seen in the foreground	17°23′49.2″N 78°23′47.7″E	Hyderabad	1666	
Jama Mosque, Golconda		17°23′03.2″N 78°24′13.4″E	Hyderabad	1518	
Jama Masjid, Hyderabad	Black-and-white image of a building with arched entrances. Two people are seen entering through one of the entrances.	17°21′44.3″N 78°28′30.3″E	Hyderabad	1597-98	
Kali Masjid		17°21′52.14″N 78°29′9.84″E	Hyderabad	1702	
Khairatabad Mosque	A richly decorated mosque is seen situated on top of a platform, with a fight of steps leads to it. The mosque is flanked by two minarets. One of the minarets is whitewashed, while the rest of the mosque is cream-colored. There are two white buildings, with arched entrances and windows on the ground level, on either side of the flight of steps. Two small trees are also seen in the foreground.	17°24′30.9″N 78°27′47.8″E	Hyderabad	1626	
Kulsum Begum Mosque	A black and white image of a small mosque amidst thick trees. The mosque is richly decorated with two large minarets in the front, and some smaller minarets and a dome only partially visible at the rear.	17°22′31.0″N 78°26′35.5″E	Hyderabad	17th century	
Masjid-e-Raheem Khan		17°22′29.29″N 78°26′30.42″E	Hyderabad	1643	
Masjid E Qutub Shahi, Langer Houz		17°22′43.2″N 78°25′04.5″E	Hyderabad		
Masjid Uppal Kalan	The foreground consists of a street and a small shop, a vehicle, and some people are visible. The background is a cream-colored mosque on a white platform, partially hidden by a tree.	17°24′6.96″N 78°33′57.90″E	Hyderabad	1660s	
Mecca Masjid	A large brown stone mosque with five arched entrances, with a courtyard in front. A projection extends from the left side of the mosque. People are seen in the courtyard, and birds flying are also visible.	17°21′37.9″N 78°28′23.8″E	Hyderabad	1693	
Mian Mishk Mosque		17°22′09.0″N 78°27′28.1″E	Hyderabad	17th century	
Mirpet Mosque			Hyderabad	1610	
Musheerabad Masjid	A black and white image of a mosque with five arched entryways, flanked by two minarets on the sides. A fountain is seen in front of the mosque	17°25′05.6″N 78°29′50.9″E	Hyderabad	1560	
Premamati Mosque	A black and white image of a building with five arched entrances	17°22′46.2″N 78°22′47.3″E	Hyderabad	1560	
Saidabad Mosque	Black-and-white close-up of three arched entrances, with the central arch fully visible and two partially visible on either side. Above the arches, a parapet runs across the image.	17°21′38.4″N 78°30′29.6″E	Hyderabad	1605	
Secretariat Mosque		17°24′35.43″N 78°28′5.28″E	Hyderabad	2023	
Shahi Masjid	A white mosque with three domes, flanked by two minarets on the sides. Trees are seen in the background.	17°24′2.0″N 78°28′8.0″E	Hyderabad	1933	
Shaikpet Mosque and Sarai (partial ruinous state)		17°24′23″N 78°23′48″E	Hyderabad	1043 AH (1633/1634 CE)	
Spanish Mosque	A building with church-like pyramidal spires	17°26′37.7″N 78°28′21.4″E	Hyderabad	1906	
Toli Masjid	A very richly decorated mosque building, with five arched entrances, flanked by two minarets	17°22′28.6″N 78°26′20.0″E	Hyderabad	1671	
Deval Masjid (partial ruinous state)	Ruins of a stone mosque	18°39′49″N 77°53′07″E	Bodhan, Nizamabad district	c. 12th century (as a temple)	

== See also ==
- Islam in India
- List of mosques in India
