= Afzal Gunj Masjid =

Mosque in Afzalgunj, Hyderabad, Telangana, India

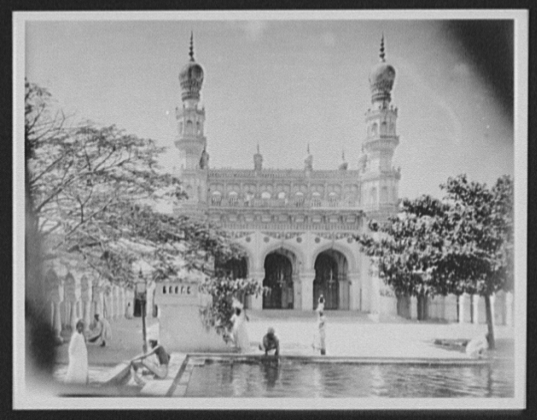
- The mosque in 1895

- Location of the mosque in Hyderabad

Religion
- Affiliation: Islam
- Ecclesiastical or organizational status: Mosque
- Status: Active

Location
- Location: Hyderabad, Hyderabad District, Telangana
- Country: India
- Interactive map of Afzal Gunj Masjid
- Coordinates: 17°26′38″N 78°28′21″E

Architecture
- Type: Mosque architecture
- Style: Qutb Shahi Revival
- Funded by: Afzal-ud-Daulah
- Completed: 1866
- Construction cost: ₹1 lakh
- Minaret: Two

The Afzal Gunj Masjid, also known as the AfzalGunj Masjid and also the Afzalgunj Mosque, is a mosque located in the Afzalgunj, Hyderabad, in the state of Telangana, India. The mosque was constructed in 1866 by Afzal-ud-Daulah, the fifth Nizam of Hyderabad, after the construction of Nayapul which connects the city with its new establishment.

== Overview ==
The mosque was commissioned by Afzal-ud-Daulah, and constructed at a cost of ₹1 lakh. Upon its completion, the mosque was the second-largest in the city, with the Mecca Masjid being the largest.

The mosque is constructed in a Qutb Shahi revival style. However, it has three arches instead of five; with two minarets in the front corner of rectangular hall. The minarets are surmounted by domes and finials, and the façade is embellished by plaster work.

== See also ==
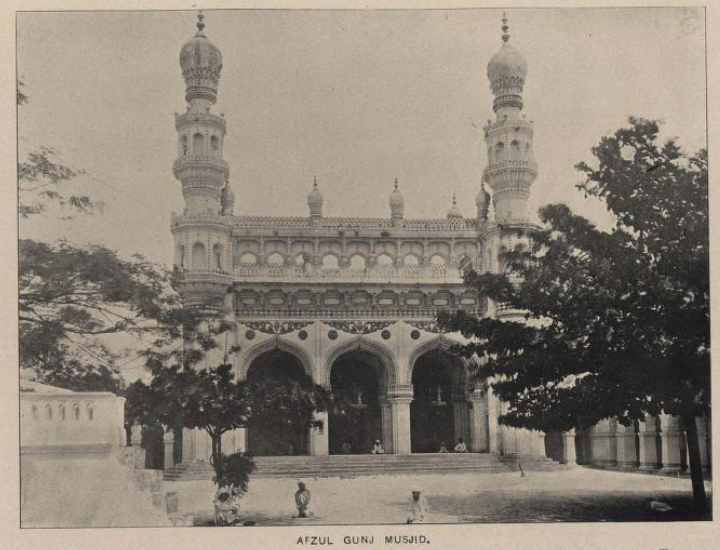
Afzal Gunj Mosque

- Islam in India
- List of mosques in Telangana
