= Azizia Masjid, Hyderabad =

Grand mosque in Mehdipatnam, Hyderabad, Telangana, India

Azizia Masjid
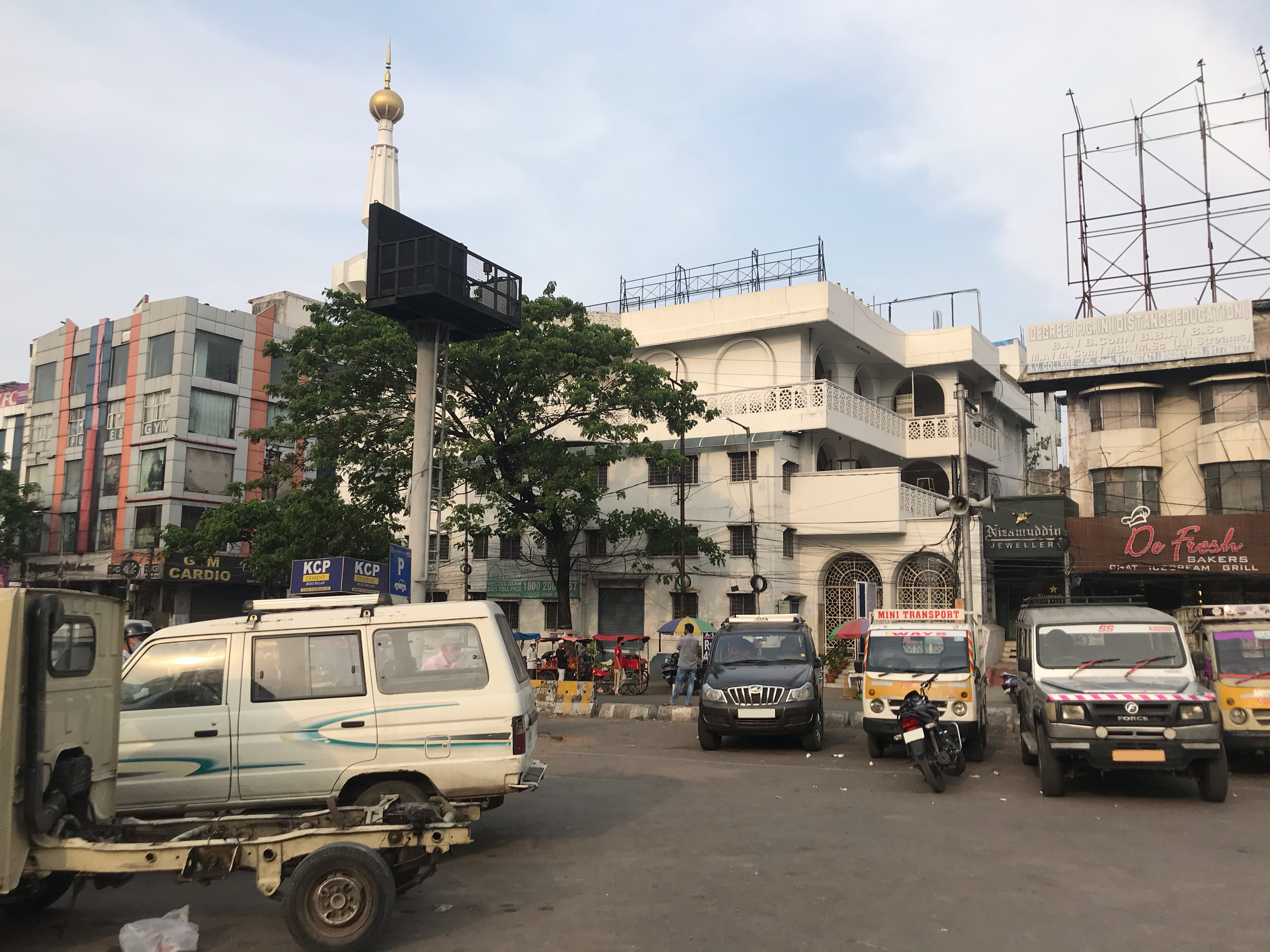
- The mosque in 2021

- Location of the mosque in Telangana Azizia Masjid, Hyderabad (Telangana) Azizia Masjid, Hyderabad (India)

Religion
- Affiliation: Islam
- Ecclesiastical or organisational status: Friday mosque
- Governing body: Telangana State Waqf Board; Jamaat-e-Islami Hind
- Leadership: Aijaz Mohiuddin Waseem (President)
- Status: Active

Location
- Location: Mehdipatnam, Hyderabad District, Telangana
- Country: India
- Coordinates: 17°23′46″N 78°26′34″E

Architecture
- Type: Mosque architecture
- Style: Indo-Islamic
- Founder: Abdul Hafeez Khan
- Completed: 1966
- Capacity: 10,000 worshippers

The Azizia Masjid, also known as the Majid-e-Azizia (Urdu: مسجد عزیزیہ; Hindi: मस्जिद अजीजिया; Telugu: మస్జిద్ అజీజియా) is a Friday mosque, located in Mehdipatnam, in the Hyderabad district of the state of Telangana, India.

It is the largest mosque in Mehdipatnam with a capacity of over 10,000 people. The mosque was built in 1966 and the building has four floors that, in an addition to the mosque, also contains the headquarters of the Students Islamic Organization of India and the Islamic Center of Jamaat-e-Islami Hind.

== History ==
The foundation stone was laid in 1966 by Abdul Hafeez Khan, and he named the mosque Azizia, after his father's name, Abdul Azeez.

== Facilities ==
=== Religious ===
This mosque is the largest mosque in Mehdipatnam with four floors that can accommodate over 10,000 worshippers. It has a Wudu Khana (Ablution Center) on every floor. It holds the Friday Jumma prayers every week and the sermons (bayan) is delivered by Aijaz Mohiuddin Waseem which focuses on current and contemporary socio-economic issues based on the Quran & Sunnah. Women may attend prayers.

=== Non-religious ===
Besides being a mosque; it also serves as a "community center". The mosque helps address the issues of health, education, jobs, etc. It provides medical aid to the poor irrespective of religion, and it provides free blood pressure and sugar level testing after the Fajr prayer.

The mosque community offers gold loans without any interest to the poor and pensions to widows and the elderly. The mosque also displays announcement of job vacancies in various government departments on its notice board.

The mosque runs a school of 'Hifz' where the Imam trains students in memorizing the Quran. It also conducts summer workshops for both boys and girls. According to Sheikh Imaduddin Madani, the imam of the mosque:

Masjid-e-Nabawi (Prophet's mosque in Medina) had a medical facility, The mosque should not merely be a place of worship. It should serve as a platform to solve the problems of the milli (community), train the people in developing their character and personality for the success in this world and the hereafter.

The masjid also has plans to expand these community services by setting up an Islamic center for inter-faith dialogues.

== Online presence ==
This mosque is one of the few in the area to have an online presence. The Friday sermons and during Ramadan are broadcast on YouTube. A Facebook account has been opened in the mosque's name to propagate its activities.

== See also ==
- Islam in India
- List of mosques in Telangana
