= Chowk Ke Masjid =

Mosque in Hyderabad, Telangana, India

Masjid-e-chowk
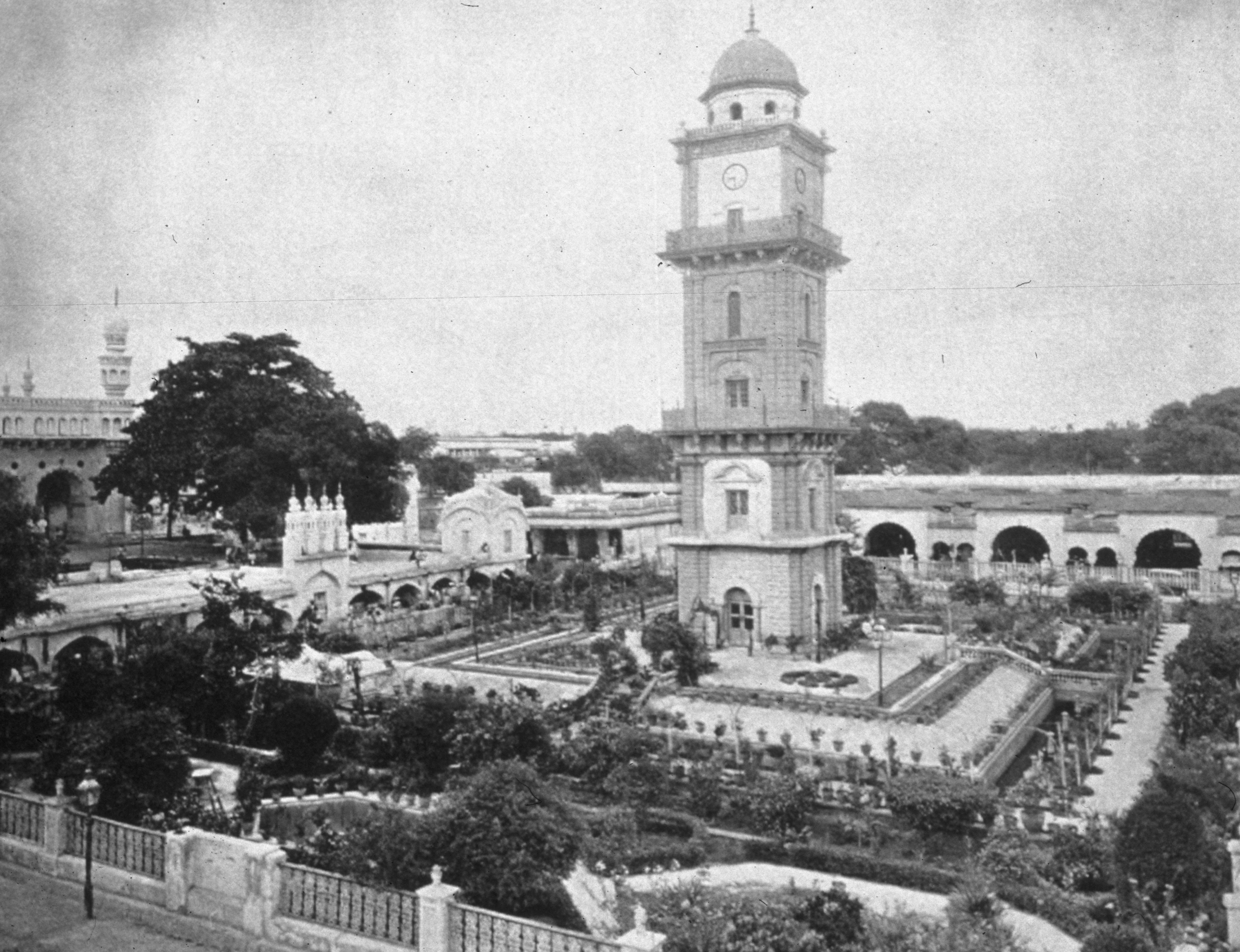
- The mosque, located to the left of the Mahboob Chowk Clock Tower, in 1898

- Location of the mosque in Hyderabad

Religion
- Affiliation: Islam
- Ecclesiastical or organizational status: Mosque
- Status: Active

Location
- Location: Hyderabad, Hyderabad District, Telangana
- Country: India
- Interactive map of Masjid-e-chowk
- Coordinates: 17°26′38″N 78°28′21″E

Architecture
- Type: Mosque architecture
- Founder: Khaja Abdullah Khan
- Completed: 1817
- Minaret: Two

The Masjid-e-chowk, also known as Chowk Ke Masjid or Jama Masjid Chowk, is a mosque located in the Mahboob Chowk Clock Tower, in Hyderabad, in the Hyderabad district of the state of Telangana, India. The mosque was constructed in 1817 by Khaja Abdullah Khan. The mosque was initially constructed with a three-arched façade. Later four arches were added by extending the structure and the two minarets in the front of rectangular hall.

== See also ==
- Islam in India
- List of mosques in Telangana
