= Masjid Uppal Kalan =

Mosque in Uppal Kalan, Hyderabad, India

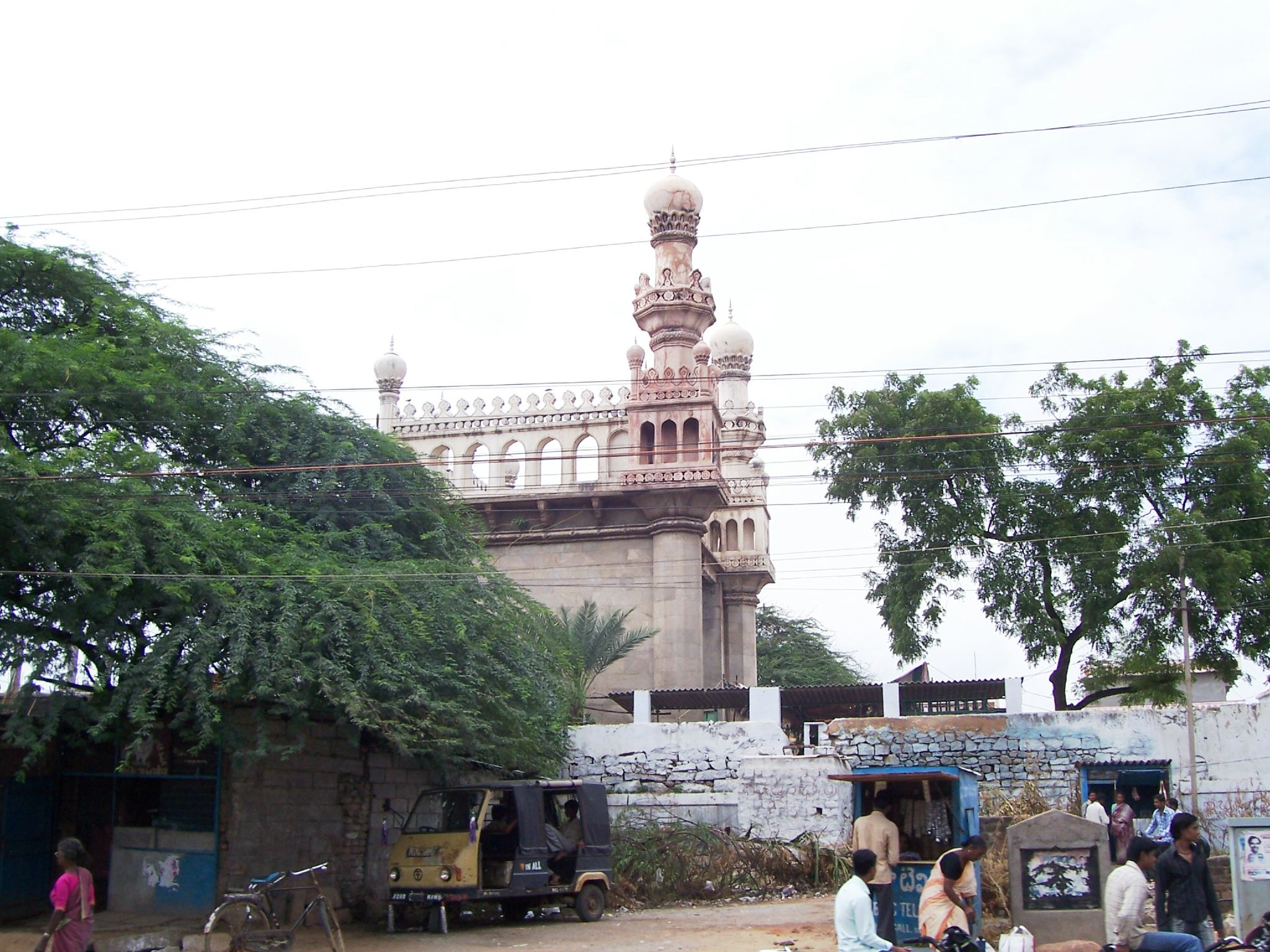
- The mosque on 1 January 2004

- Location of the mosque in Hyderabad

Religion
- Affiliation: Islam
- Ecclesiastical or organizational status: Mosque
- Status: Active

Location
- Location: Uppal Kalan, Hyderabad, Hyderabad District, Telangana
- Country: India
- Interactive map of Masjid Uppal Kalan
- Coordinates: 17°24′6.96″N 78°33′57.90″E

Architecture
- Type: Mosque architecture
- Style: Qutb Shahi
- Founder: Abdullah Qutb Shah
- Completed: c. 1660s CE
- Minaret: Four

The Masjid Uppal Kalan is a mosque located in the Uppal Kalan neighborhood of Hyderabad, in the Hyderabad district of the state of Telangana, India. The mosque was built in c. 1660s CE by Abdullah Qutb Shah.

== Overview ==
Completed in the Qutb Shahi style, the mosque is built on a plinth, which is accessed by a flight of stairs. The façade has three arched entrances, over which is a chajja supported by stone brackets. The façade is flanked by two tall minarets on either side, with two smaller minarets at the rear of the mosque.

== See also ==
- Islam in India
- List of mosques in Telangana
