= Secretariat Mosque =

Mosque in Hyderabad, Telangana, India

- Location of the mosque in Hyderabad

Religion
- Affiliation: Islam
- Ecclesiastical or organizational status: Mosque
- Status: Active

Location
- Location: Hyderabad, Hyderabad District, Telangana
- Country: India
- Interactive map of Secretariat Mosque
- Coordinates: 17°24′35″N 78°28′06″E

Architecture
- Type: Mosque architecture
- Groundbreaking: 2021
- Completed: 2023

The Secretariat Mosque is a mosque in Hyderabad, in the Hyderabad district of the state of Telangana, India.

== History ==
Two mosques were located within the old secretariat complex, named Masjid-e-Hashmi and Masjid Dafatir-e-Mautamadi. These mosques were demolished by the government to construct the new Secretariat building.

To replace these mosques, the government announced the construction of a mosque, spread across 1,300 square metres (1,500 sq yd) at a cost of Rs. 2.9 crore. The foundation stone was laid on November 25, 2021.

The mosque was due to be inaugurated on August 25, 2023, along with a temple and a church; and it was officially active from August 2023.

== See also ==
- Islam in India
- List of mosques in Hyderabad
