= List of Monuments of National Importance in Telangana =

Important monuments in Telangana, India

This is a list of Telangana's monuments of national importance that are officially recognized and available through the website of the Archaeological Survey of India (ASI). These archaeological sites are in the Indian state of Telangana; however, the published list has not been updated since the creation of Telangana in 2014. Here, the list has been renumbered for Telangana, with eight monuments of national importance that have been recognized by the ASI.

As of 2015, no monuments have been recognised from the districts of Adilabad, Karimnagar, Nalgonda, Nizamabad, and Ranga Reddy.

== List of monuments ==
SL. No.	Description	Location	Address	District	Coordinates	Image
N-AP-78	Charminar	Hyderabad		Hyderabad	17°21′42″N 78°28′29″E	Charminar More images
N-AP-79	Golkonda Fort, Fortifications	Hyderabad		Hyderabad	17°23′N 78°24′E	Golkonda Fort, Fortifications More images
N-AP-80	Pre- historic site	Janapet		Khammam district	18°04′45″N 80°42′01″E	Upload Photo
N-AP-105	Ancient Mound	Kondapur		Medak district	17°33′41″N 78°00′40″E	Upload Photo
N-AP-106	Alampur Temples	Alampur		Mahbubnagar district	15°52′40″N 78°08′08″E	Alampur Temples More images
N-AP-129	Thousand Pillar Temple	Hanamkonda		Warangal district	18°01′00″N 79°38′00″E	Thousand Pillar Temple More images
N-AP-130	Ramappa Temple	Palampet		Warangal district	18°15′33″N 79°56′36″E	Ramappa Temple More images
N-AP-131	Warangal Fort, and Gateways	Warangal		Warangal district	17°57′26″N 79°36′52″E	Warangal Fort, and Gateways More images
N-AP-132	Pillalamarri Temple	Pillalamarri		Suryapet district	17°10′11″N 79°34′56″E	Pillalamarri Temple More images

== See also ==
- List of Monuments of National Importance in India for the lists for other states
- List of State Protected Monuments in Telangana
- List of state protected Monuments in Andhra Pradesh
