= Masjid-e-Raheem Khan =

Mosque in Hyderabad, Telangana, India

- Location of the mosque in Hyderabad

Religion
- Affiliation: Islam
- Ecclesiastical or organizational status: Mosque
- Status: Active

Location
- Location: Karwan, Hyderabad, Hyderabad District, Telangana
- Country: India
- Interactive map of Masjid-e-Raheem Khan
- Coordinates: 17°22′29.29″N 78°26′30.42″E

Architecture
- Type: Mosque architecture
- Style: Qutb Shahi

Specifications
- Minaret: Two
- Inscriptions: Ayat al-Kursi
- Materials: Basalt

The Masjid-e-Raheem Khan, also known as the Rahim Khan's Mosque, is a mosque, located in the Karwan area of Hyderabad, in the Hyderabad district of the state of Telangana, India.

The mosque was completed in 1643 CE.

== Architecture ==
Haroon Khan Sherwani described the mosque as having practically all the peculiarities of Qutb Shahi mosques. The mosque has three arched entrances. It is flanked by two minarets on each side. In front of the courtyard is a terrace with some graves.

The prayer hall measures 8.2 by 5.5 metres (27 by 18 ft). The Ayat al-Kursi is inscribed in the Thuluth script in black basalt on the semi-decagonal mihrab.

== See also ==
- Islam in India
- List of mosques in Telangana
