= Mirpet Mosque =

Mosque in Hyderabad, Telangana, India

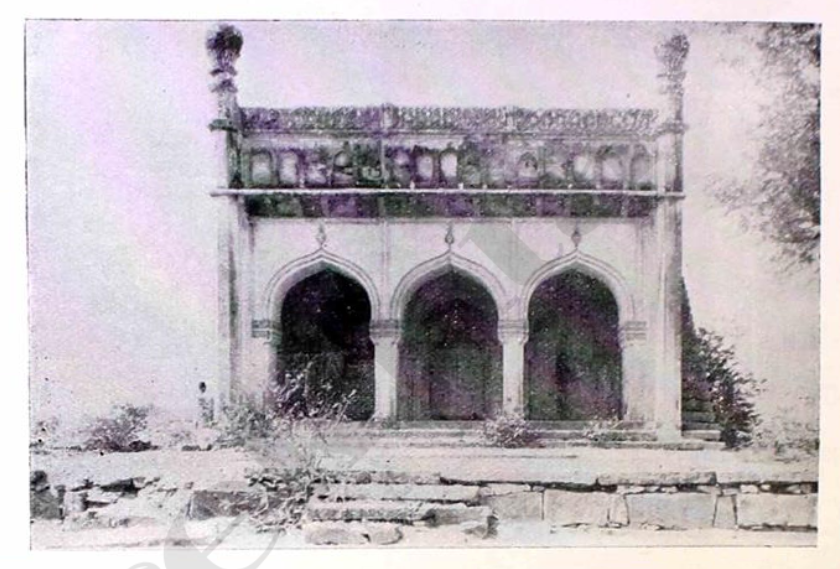
- The mosque, in 1941

Religion
- Affiliation: Islam
- Ecclesiastical or organizational status: Mosque
- Status: Active

Location
- Location: Hyderabad, Telangana
- Country: India

Architecture
- Type: Mosque architecture
- Style: Qutb Shahi
- Founder: Mir Mu'min Astarabadi
- Completed: 1019 AH (1610/1611 CE)
- Minaret: Two

The Mirpet Mosque is a mosque located in Meerpet, Hyderabad, in the state of Telangana, India. The mosque was completed in 1019 AH (1610/1611 CE), and commissioned by Mir Mu'min Astarabadi, after whom the locality is named.

== Architecture ==
The architecture of the mosque is similar to that of the Saidabad Mosque, also established by Mir Mu'min.

The mosque is situated with a large courtyard, measuring approximately 84 by 66 metres (277 by 216 ft). The courtyard is entered through a large gateway on the east. The facade of the mosque contains three arched entrances leading into the interior. An alam motif is present above each arch. Above the entrance arches, a panel of fifteen small arches runs along the length of the facade.

Each of the spandrels of the mihrab contains a medallion, upon which an inscription is carved. The inscriptions on the medallions, translated into English, read:

So said the prophet of the two worlds (left); the mu'min is alive in this world and the hereafter, 1019. (right)

This is a play on words, with "mu'min" meaning "believer" (that is, a true Muslim), as well as being the name of the mosque's founder, Mir Mu'min Astarabadi. The medallion on the right also gives the date of the mosque's construction as 1019 AH (1610/1611 CE).

== See also ==
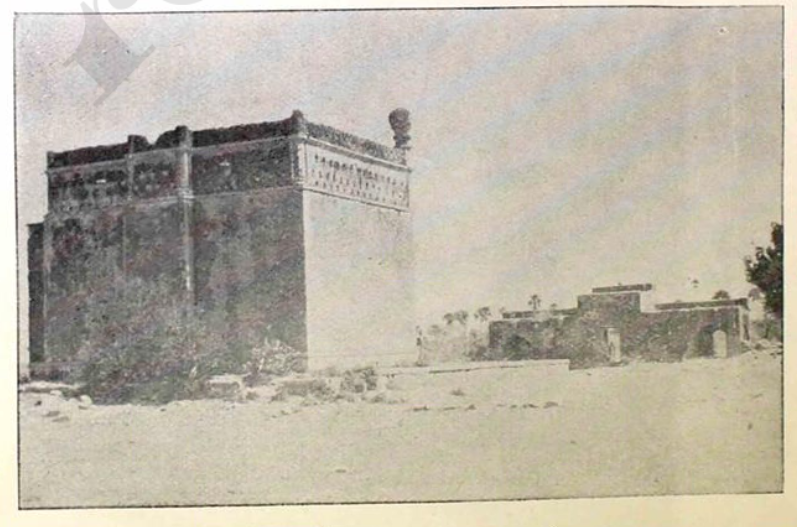
The mosque, viewed from the rear, in 1941.

- Islam in India
- List of mosques in India
