= Musheerabad Mosque =

Mosque in Hyderabad, Telangana, India

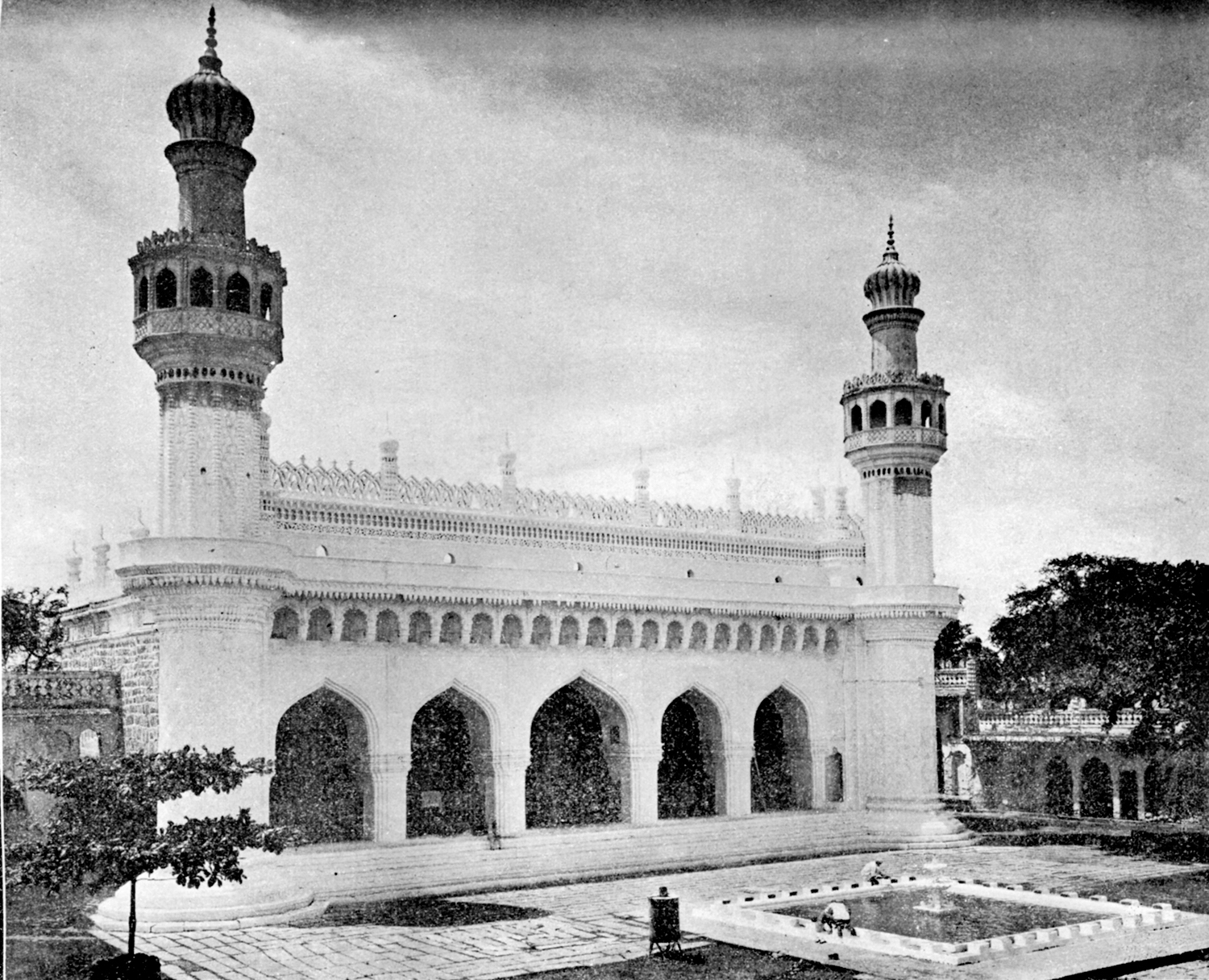
- The mosque c. 1940s, photographed by Ghulam Yazdani

- Location of the mosque in Hyderabad

Religion
- Affiliation: Islam
- Ecclesiastical or organizational status: Mosque
- Status: Active

Location
- Location: Musheerabad, Hyderabad, Hyderabad District, Telangana
- Country: India
- Interactive map of Musheerabad Mosque
- Coordinates: 17°25′06″N 78°29′52″E

Architecture
- Type: Mosque architecture
- Style: Qutb Shahi
- Founder: Ibrahim Quli Qutb Shah
- Groundbreaking: 1545 CE
- Completed: 1560 CE
- Minaret: Two

The Musheerabad Mosque, also known as the Masjid e Kalan, and as the Musheerabad Badi Masjid, and as the Jama Masjid Musheerabad, is a mosque located in the Musheerabad locality of Hyderabad, in the Hyderabad district of the state of Telangana, India. The original portion was constructed in 1560 CE by Ibrahim Quli Qutb Shah, the fourth Sultan of the Qutb Shahi dynasty and is identical to the Hayat Bakshi Mosque located in Hayathnagar area of Hyderabad.

== Overview ==
After the fall of Golconda, the mosque went into disuse and remained abandoned till the area became a jagir of Nawab Arastu Jah, the Prime Minister during the reign of Nizam Ali Khan. It was also repaired in 1951. Today, the old structure is in a dilapidated state.

A new four-storied portion has been constructed to accommodate the namazis. There used to be a large courtyard where the new portion stands today.

The mosque was completed in the Qutb Shahi style and has five lofty arches and two minarets at the corners.

== See also ==
- Islam in India
- List of mosques in Telangana
