= Mahboob Chowk Clock Tower =

Clock tower built in 1892 in Hyderabad, India

Coordinates: 17°21′42″N 78°28′15″E

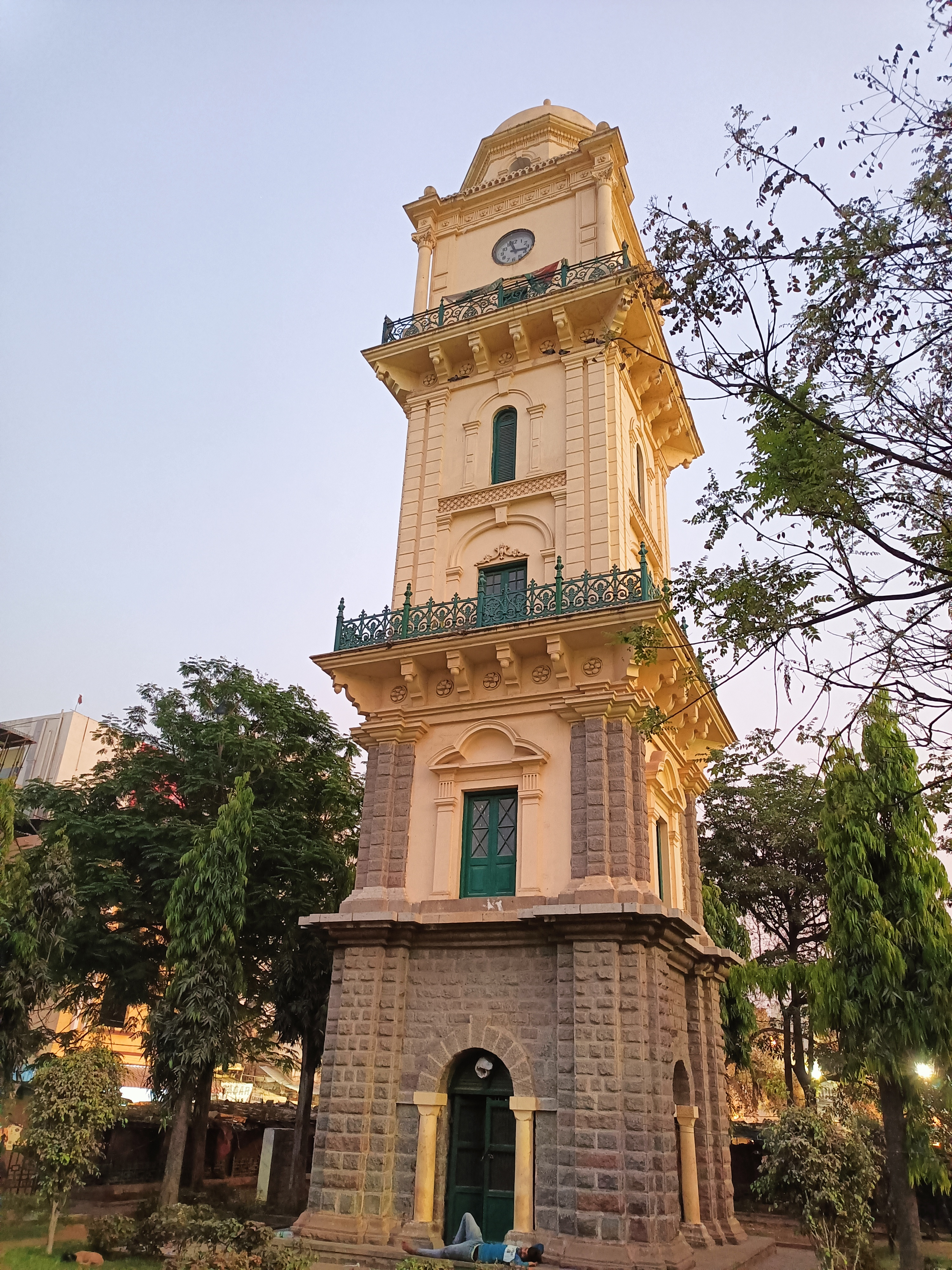
- Location: Hyderabad, India

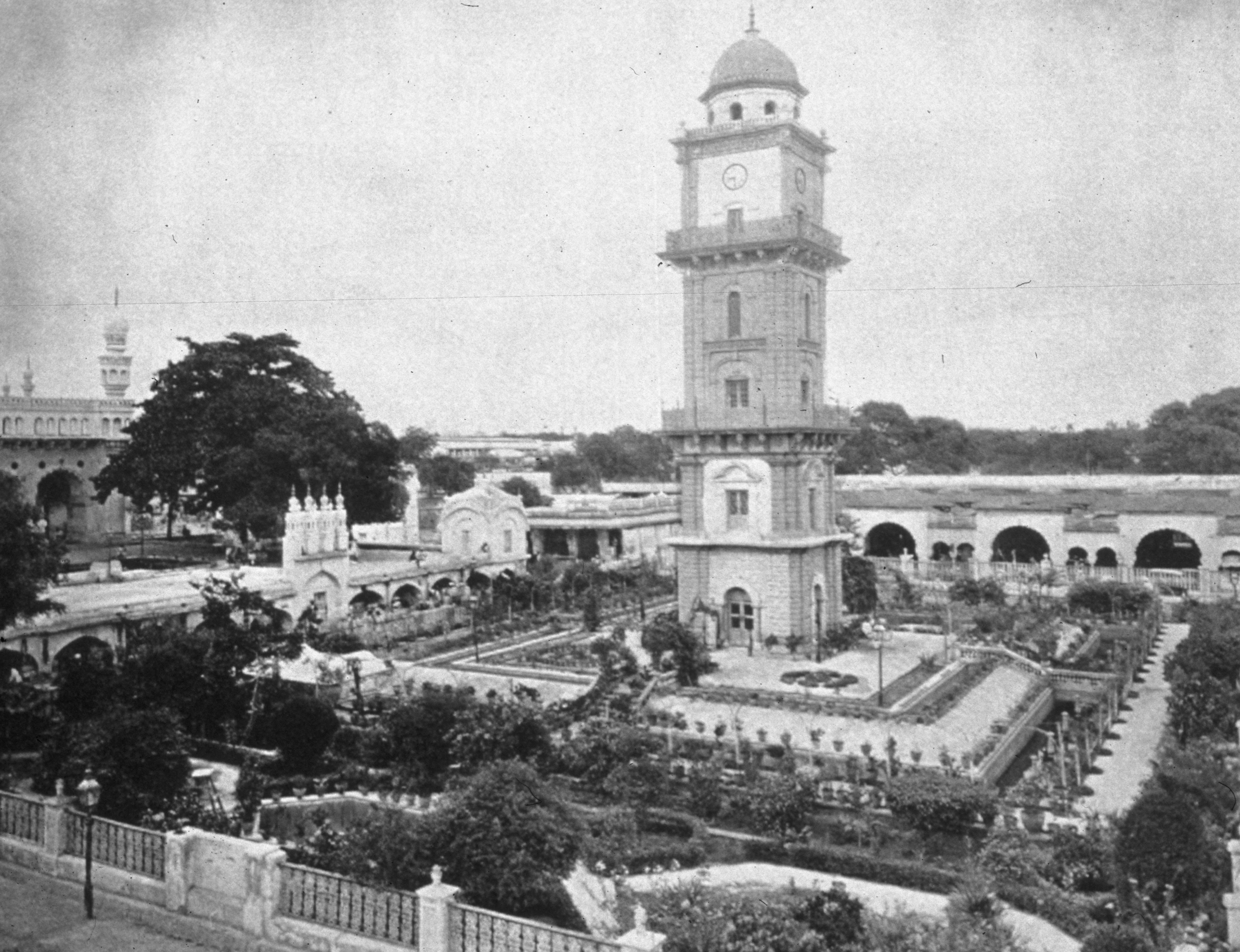
Mahboob Chowk Clock Tower in 1890s

== History ==
Mahboob Chowk Clock Tower is a five-storied architectural clock tower which was built in 1892 by Asman Jah, Prime Minister of Hyderabad. Named after the 6th Nizam of Hyderabad – (Mir Mahboob Ali Khan), the Mahboob Chowk area is considered to be an important part architectural heritage of Hyderabad.

The clock tower is erected in the midst of the small garden; it has four large clocks on its sides which enable the time to be seen from any direction. The clock tower is designed in the Turkish style. The tower is located west of the Charminar, not far from Laad Bazaar.

== Restoration ==
The Mahboob Chowk Clock Tower for decades stood in a state of neglect, with its clock faces nonfunctional and the surrounding garden overgrown. The structure had deteriorated due to weathering and lack of maintenance, prompting concern for its preservation. In 2018, the Greater Hyderabad Municipal Corporation (GHMC) undertook a major restoration as part of the Charminar Pedestrianisation Project. The works included cleaning and strengthening the stone masonry, repairing and restarting the four clocks, re-plastering damaged portions, and redesigning the landscaped garden with new pathways, benches, and lighting. The project, estimated at around ₹1 crore, successfully brought the century-old tower back to working condition after years of disuse.

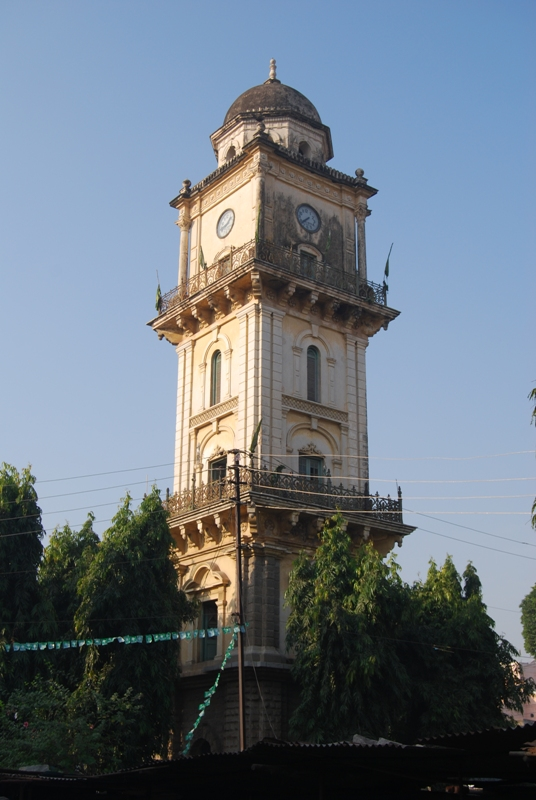
Mahboob Chowk Clock Tower before Restoration

Since its restoration, the Mahboob Chowk Clock Tower has regained its prominence as a heritage landmark in Hyderabad’s old city. The tower, with its distinctive Indo-European design and restored clock mechanism, now serves as both a historical monument and a public gathering point. Its illumination at night has added to the visual charm of the Charminar precinct, and it is increasingly featured in heritage walks and tourism circuits celebrating Hyderabad’s architectural legacy.
