= Telangana State Waqf Board =

- Formation: 1954
- Headquarters: Central Waqf Council, New Delhi-110017
- Location: Hyderabad
- Region served: India
- Official language: English, Telugu and Urdu
- Chairman: Mohammed Masiullah Khan.
- Main organ: Council
- Affiliations: Minister of State for Ministry of Minority Affairs, Government of Telangana

Telangana State Waqf Board (formerly A.P. State Waqf Board), is a constituted Board established by the 1954 Central Act to manage, regulate and protect the exclusive affairs of Muslim endowment (Waqf) properties, Waqf institutions and Marriage Records of the Muslim community of Telangana, India. It is generally known and operates under the name and style of Muslim Waqf Board.

The then chairman of A.P State Waqf Board Mr. Syed Ahamed Ali (Alhaj Syed Ahamed Ali) during the time of the then Chief Minister Mr. N.T.Rama Rao. Mr. Ahamed Ali who was initially a businessman worked very efficiently during his tenure as Waqf Board Chairman. He was a key person in establishing Imdad Ghar in Vijayawada which is now a major source of revenue for Waqf Board in Vijayawada.

It was formerly known as Umoor-E-Mazhabi established in 1396 and Fasli during the Nizams rule in Hyderabad State.

== History ==
Muslim Waqf Board was constituted under provisions of the Waqf Act in July 1996. Andhra Pradesh has the distinction of being the first state in India to have framed elections rules under this Act and conducted elections and, thus, the A.P.S. Waqf Board has the distinction of being the first board in the country to have been constituted under the provisions of the new Act. Under the provisions of Waqf Act 1995 the Waqf Board is a corporate body having perpetual succession.

== Administration ==
Telangana state waqf board is headed by Chairman of Waqf board, under the Ministry of Minority Affairs, Government of Telangana.

=== During Nizams ===
His Exalted Highness the 7th Nizam of Hyderabad promulgated a regulation of 1349 Fasli, known as Hyderabad Endowment Regulations under which a Nazim Umoor E Mazhabi (Director, Ecclesiastical Department) was appointed to supervise Waqf administration on behalf of the government. These regulations though brief, provided for every important aspect of Waqf administration in the erstwhile Hyderabad government. It contained 16 sections and provided for registration of Waqf properties, maintenance of Kitab Ul Awqaf (Waqf Register) (S3-11) in the prescribed manner by the Nazim.

The unique feature of the Hyderabad Endowment Regulations, 1349 Fasli was its secular character which provided for registration and the supervision of not only the Hindu and Muslim Waqfs but endowments of all religions. Therefore, the rules made under these regulations were very exhaustive, numbering about 525.

== Properties ==
properties
| Region | Number of institutions | Area in acres |
|---|---|---|
| Telangana | 32,157(90%) | 77,538 (53.3%) |
| Rayalaseema | 1,616 (4.5%) | 27,044 (18.6%) |
| Andhra | 1,930 (5.4%) | 40,929 (28.1%) |
| Total | 35,703 | 145,511 |

== Welfare activities ==
The Muslim Waqf Board of A.P. looks after the benefits of Muslim residents of Hyderabad and in general Andhra Pradesh. They organize mass marriages of Muslims communities' poor people. They provide or sponsor vocational technical training for Muslim youths.

The Muslim Waqf Board sponsors orphanages in many cities of A.P. The most famous one is Anees-ul-Gurba, an orphanage at Nampally, Hyderabad.

== Encroachment ==
In Telangana alone, more than 55000 Acres of land out of 77000 acres have been encroached by miscreants. Most of the huge projects came up near IT Corridor in Hyderabad, belongs to waqf, prime example, Lanco Hills. Telangana Waqf Board is trying to digitise the waqf land records and Telangana State government is also taking measures to protect the waqf land. Recently, Telangana Government has banned registration of waqf and endowment lands.
