= Nayapul =

- Inner city
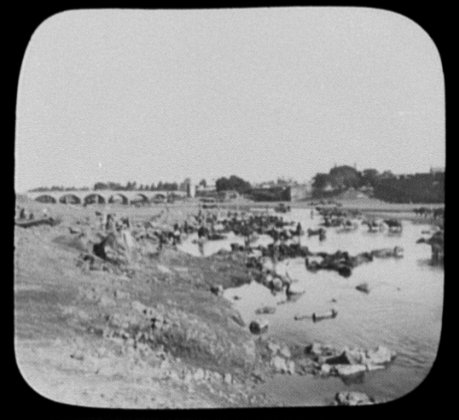
- view of Nayapul circa 1895

- Location in Hyderabad, Telangana, India Nayapul (Telangana) Nayapul (India)
- Coordinates: 17.3707°N 78.4763°E
- Country: India
- State: Telangana
- District: Hyderabad District
- Metro: Hyderabad

Government
  - Body: GHMC

Languages
  - Official: Telugu
- Time zone: UTC+5:30 (IST)
- PIN: 500 010
- Vehicle registration: TG
- Lok Sabha constituency: Hyderabad, Telangana
- Vidhan Sabha constituency: Charminar
- Planning agency: GHMC
- Website: telangana.gov.in

Nayapul (meaning 'new bridge') is a neighbourhood of Hyderabad, Telangana, India. It gets its name from the bridge that was built during the time of the Nizams called as Nayapul because there was already another bridge called Puaranapul.

== Places of interest ==
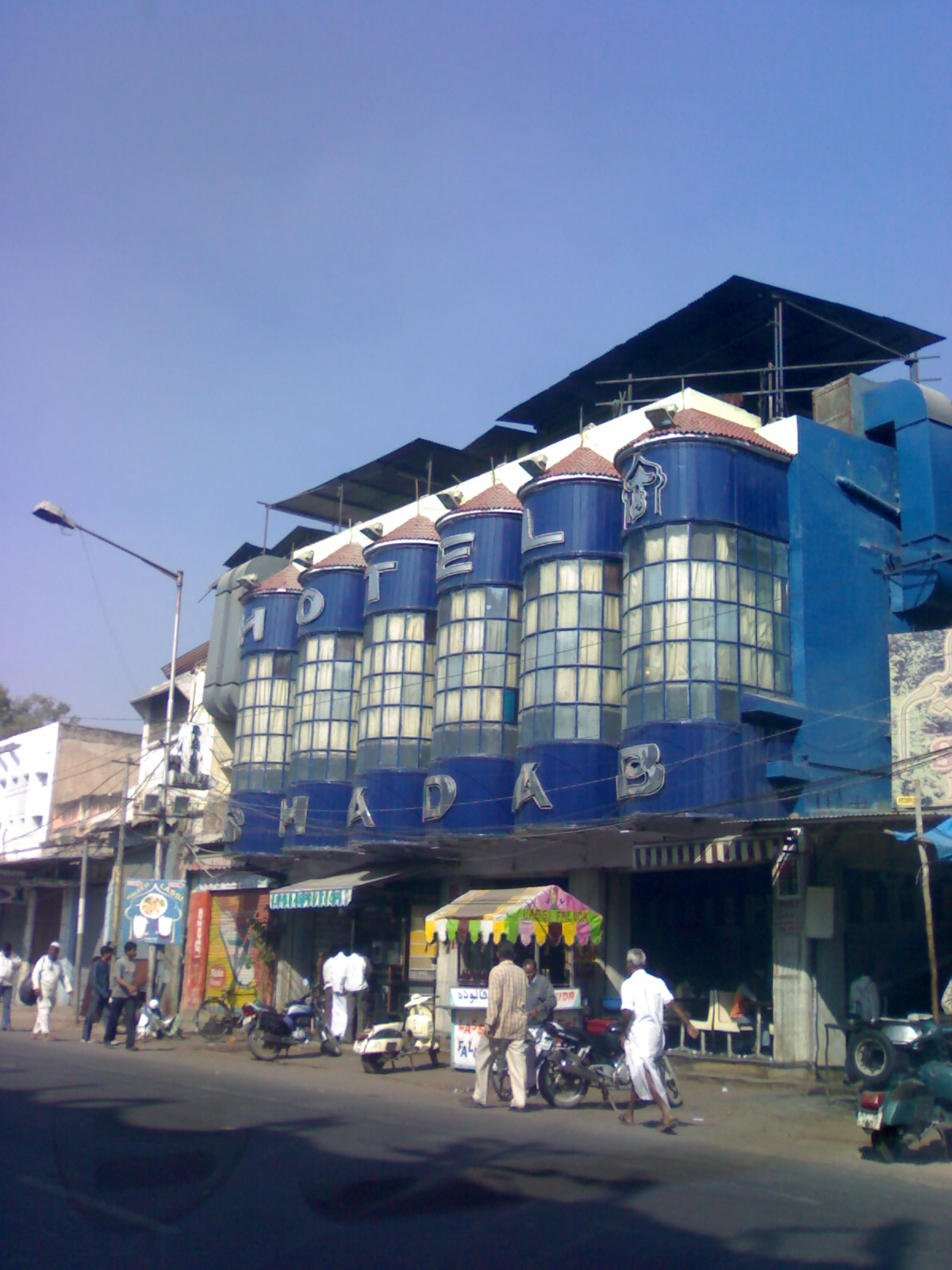
Hotel Shadab at Madina cross roads

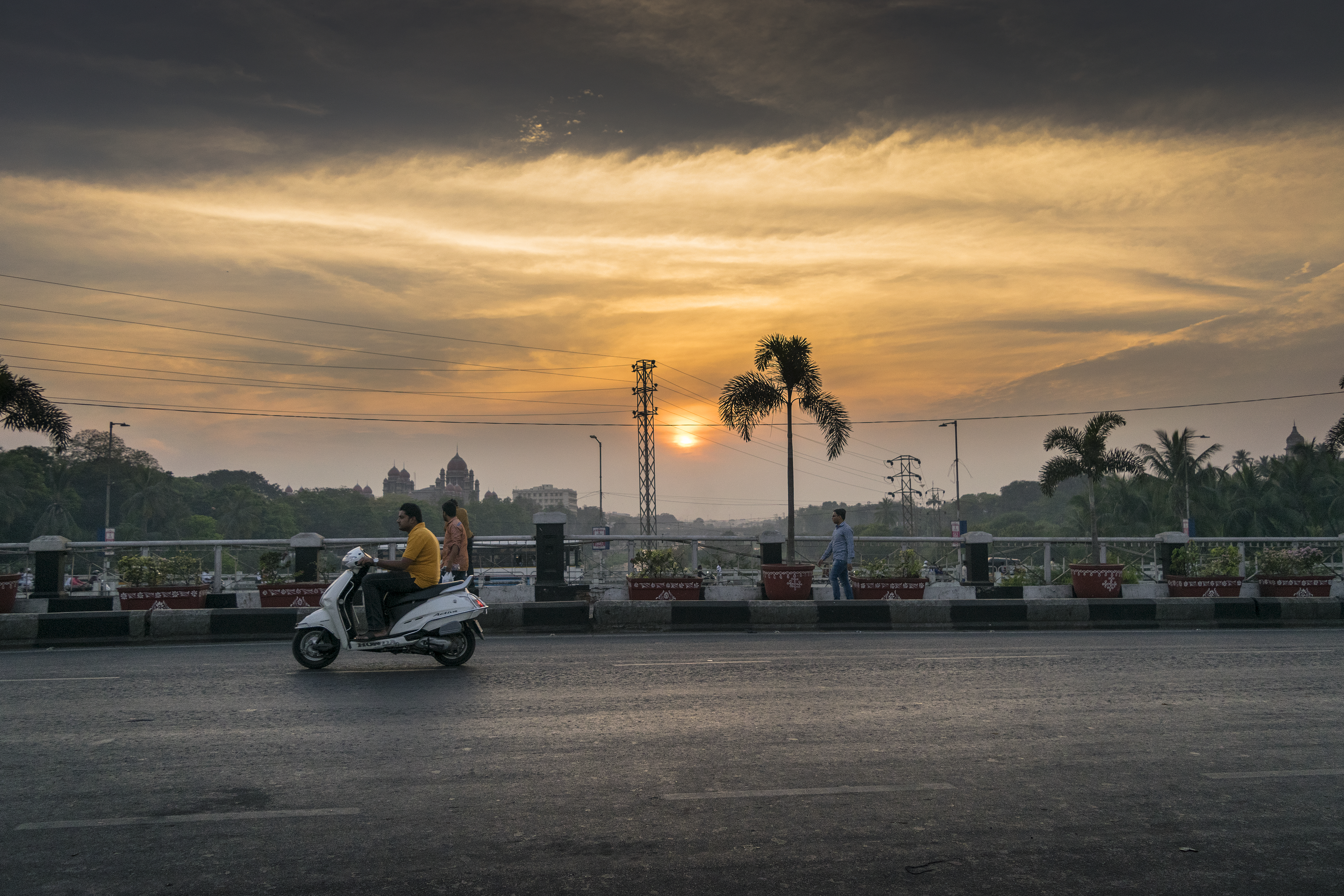
Sunset at Nayapul

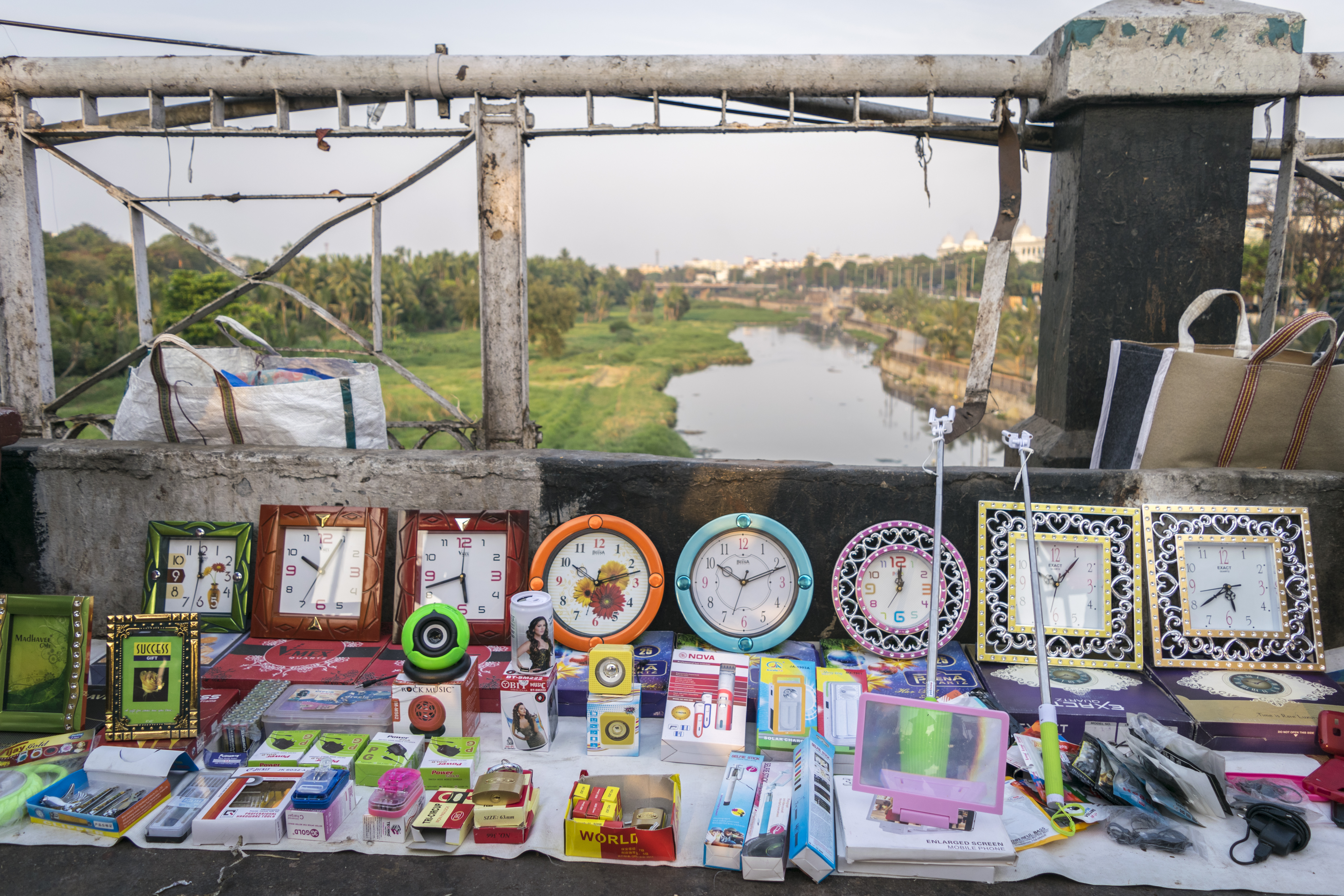
Footpath shop

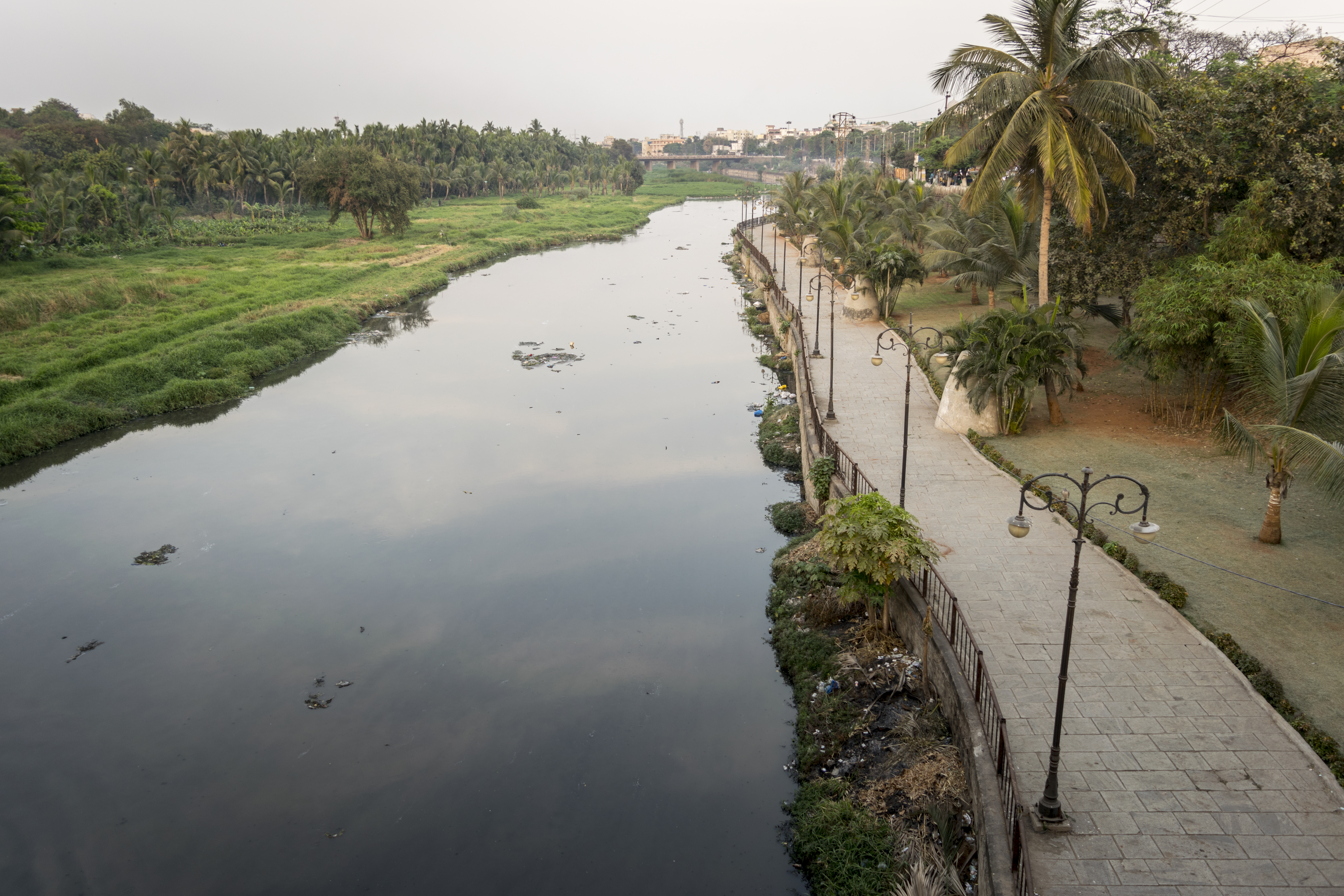
View of Musi river from Nayapul

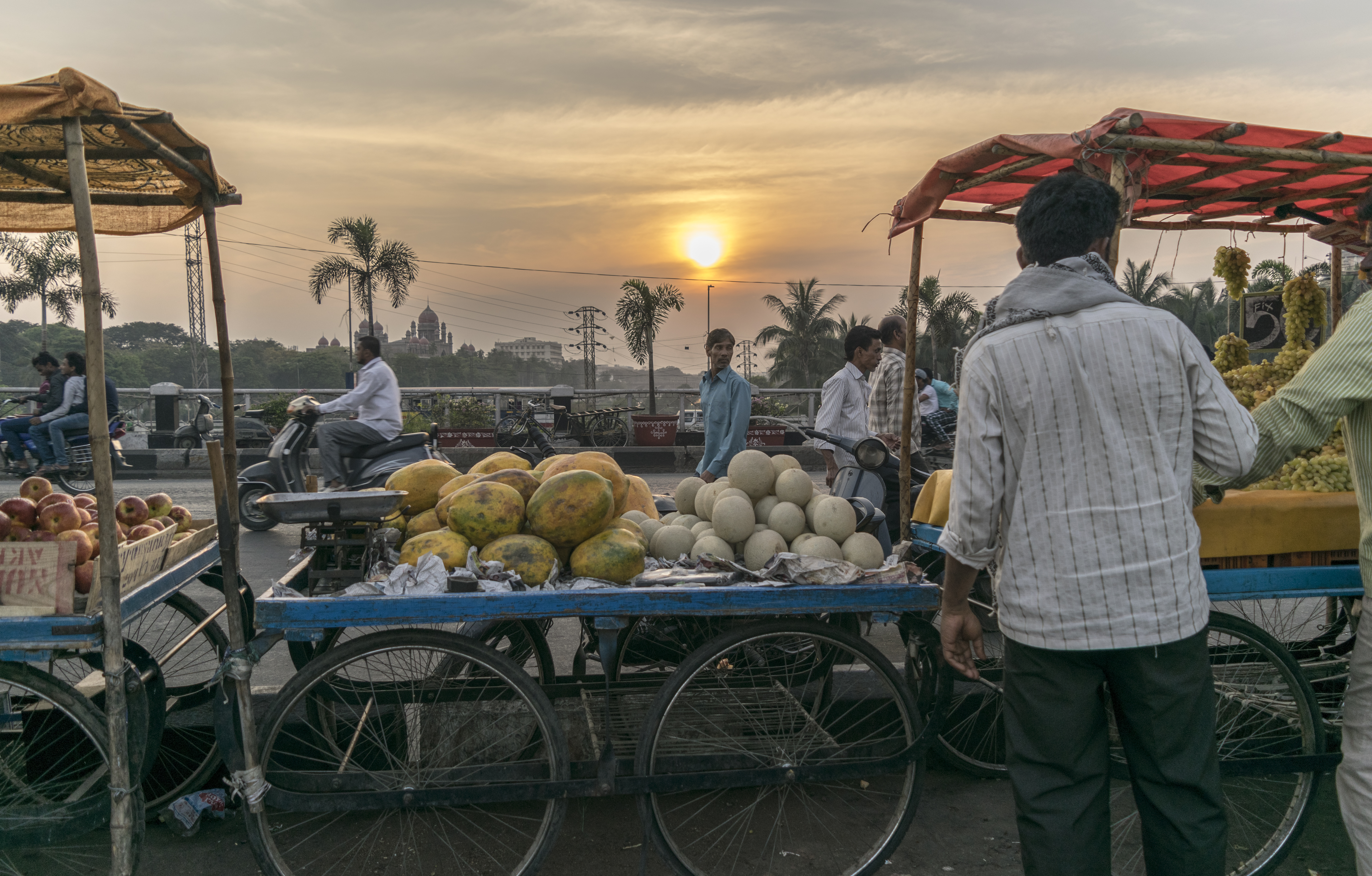
Fruit vendors at Nayapul

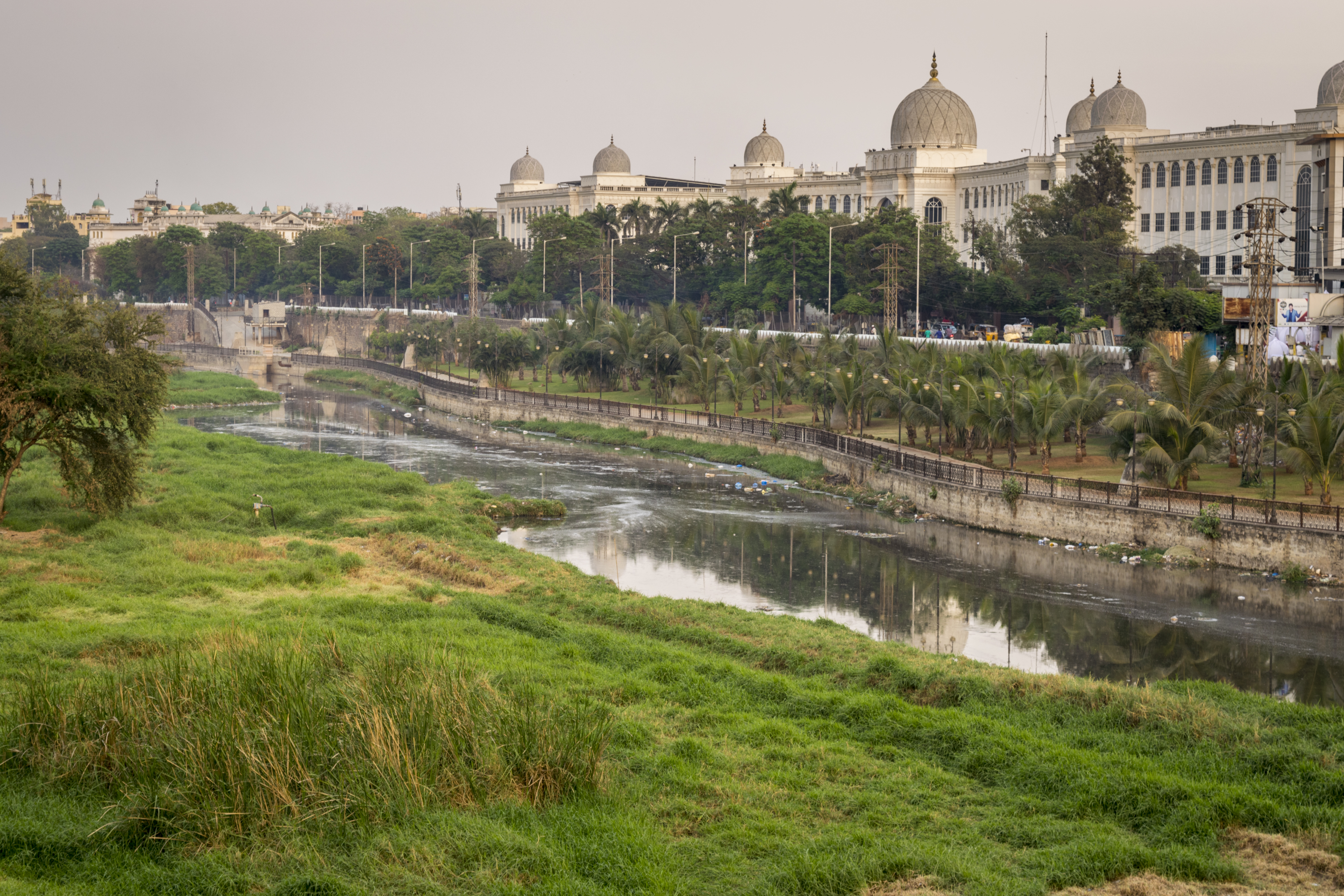
Musi river and salar jung museum

It is very close to the historic Charminar. The famous Salar Jung Museum and Afzal Gunj Mosque is located here. This is a major shopping center for the people of old city. In the close by Madina area, there are some popular Hyderabadi restaurants like the Hotel Shadab which serve popular Hyderabadi dishes including Hyderabadi haleem and udupi restaurants.

== Transport ==
Buses are run by TSRTC connect nayapul to important parts of the city. The closest MMTS Train station is at Nampally.
