= Hayat Bakshi Mosque, Hayathnagar =

Mosque in Hyderabad, Telangana, India

Hayat Bakshi Mosque
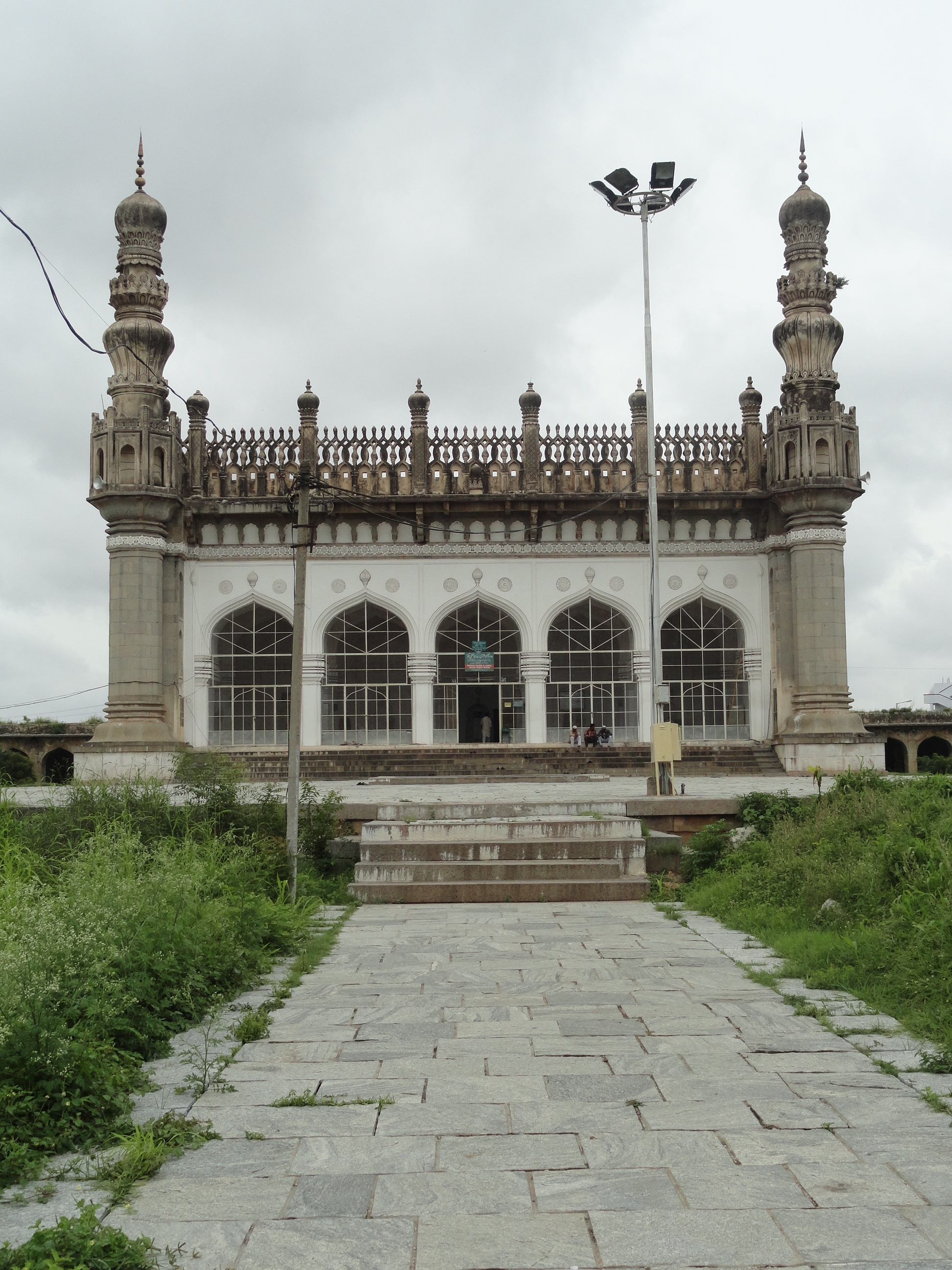
- The mosque in 2012

- Location of the mosque in Hyderabad

Religion
- Affiliation: Islam
- Ecclesiastical or organisational status: Mosque and adjoining caravanserai
- Status: Active

Location
- Location: Hayathnagar, Hyderabad, Hyderabad District, Telangana
- Country: India
- Coordinates: 17°19′34″N 78°35′56″E

Architecture
- Type: Mosque architecture
- Style: Qutb Shahi
- Completed: 1672 CE

Specifications
- Minaret: Two
- Materials: Granite

The Hayat Bakshi Mosque also Hayat Bakshi Begum Masjid is a mosque located in Hayathnagar, near Hyderabad, in the Hyderabad district of the state of Telangana, India. It was constructed in 1672 during the reign of Abdullah Qutb Shah the fifth Sultan of Golconda, and named after Hayat Bakshi Begum.

== Architecture ==
The mosque is built in typical Qutb Shahi style; with the Sarai, a rest house for the weary travellers. The façade features five arches, two minarets as well as a frieze and parapet which runs around the twelve-sided arcaded galleries protruding from the corner minarets. The prayer hall is set on a raised platform. Toward the eastern side of the platform and below the mosque is an ablution tank. The large complex occupies nearly 2.0 hectares (5 acres). The caravan sarai (rest house) is a 150 by 130 metres (490 by 430 ft) courtyard. This guest house is said to have 130 rooms. Hathi Bawli (meaning well of elephant), is a very large well on the north-east of the mosque.

== Controversy ==
In May 2009, the archaeology and museums department requested permission from the Greater Hyderabad Municipal Corporation (GHMC) to tear down twenty structures abutting the Hayat Bakshi Begum Mosque. The destruction was in violation of the Ancient Monuments and Archaeological Sites and Remains Act of 1960.

== See also ==
- Islam in India
- List of mosques in Telangana
