= Jama Masjid, Hyderabad =

Mosque in Hyderabad, Telangana, India

Jama Masjid
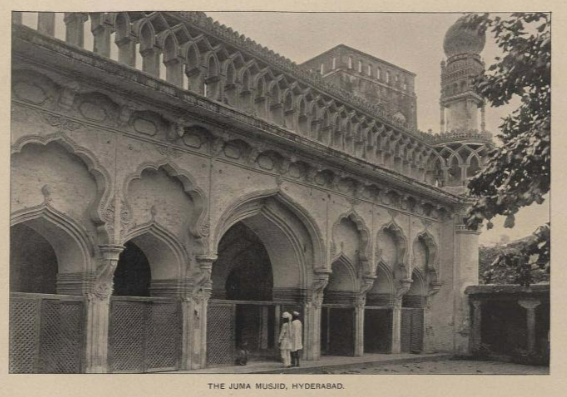
- The mosque in c. 1898

- Location of the mosque in Hyderabad

Religion
- Affiliation: Islam
- Ecclesiastical or organizational status: Friday mosque
- Status: Active

Location
- Location: Hyderabad, Hyderabad District, Telangana
- Country: India
- Interactive map of Jama Masjid
- Coordinates: 17°21′44″N 78°28′30″E

Architecture
- Type: Mosque architecture
- Style: Qutb Shahi; Mughal
- Completed: 1006 AH (1597/1598 CE)
- Construction cost: ₹200,000

Specifications
- Capacity: 750 worshippers
- Minaret: Two
- Inscriptions: Two: –Entrance: Nastaliq script; –Western wall: Thuluth script

The Jama Masjid is a Friday mosque located in Hyderabad, in the Hyderabad district of the state of Telangana, India. It is situated to the northeast of the Charminar at a short distance, approached by a narrow lane. It was built in 1597–98, around the same time as the founding of Hyderabad, and was one of the first mosques to be built in the city.

The mosque is located within a courtyard, which also contains a hammam and a cistern. Its façade contains seven arched entrances leading into the prayer-hall, and is flanked by two minarets. The inscriptions located on the exterior and within the interior of the mosque are considered to be of high artistic merit. It can accommodate approximately 750 worshippers.

== Background ==
The city of Hyderabad was established in the late 16th century by Muhammad Quli Qutb Shah, the fifth sultan of the Golconda Sultanate. The Jama Masjid was built in 1597–98, and was the first mosque to be built in Hyderabad after the mosque on the first floor of the Charminar.

The mosque was constructed at a cost of 200,000 rupees. It was intended to be the congregational mosque of the new city. It served this purpose in the initial period after the city's founding, when its population was small. Later, the much larger Mecca Masjid was built to accommodate the city's growing population, but the Jama Masjid remained the principal congregational mosque. Wolseley Haig noted that it was a common misconception among visitors that the "huge" Mecca Masjid, rather than the "far less pretentious" Jama Masjid, was the congregational mosque. A school and a monastery were attached to the mosque. The building underwent heavy restorations in the 19th century, during the rule of Asaf Jah III, and some scholars speculate that the cusped arches on the façade were added during this period.

== Architecture ==
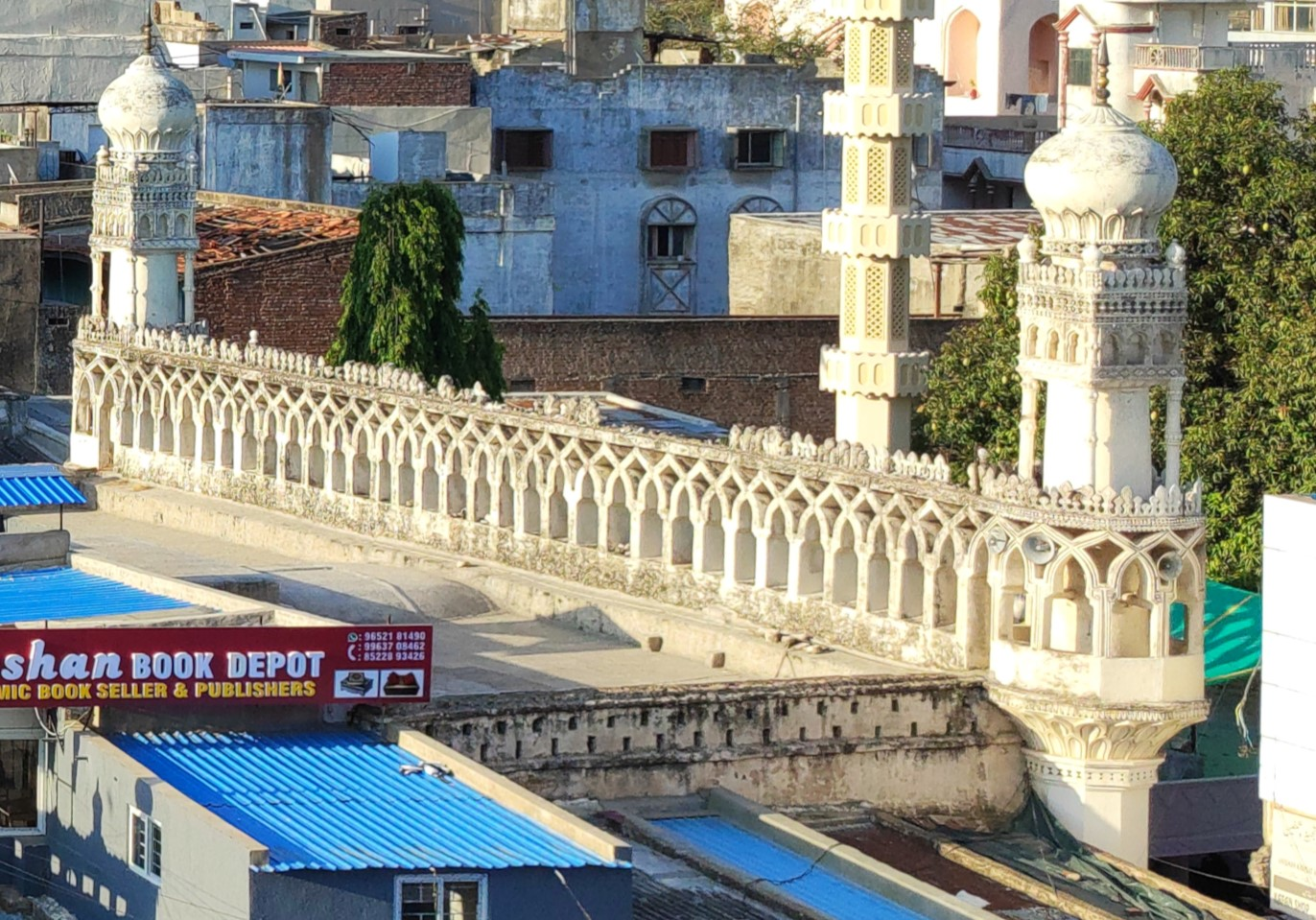
Minarets and parapet of the mosque

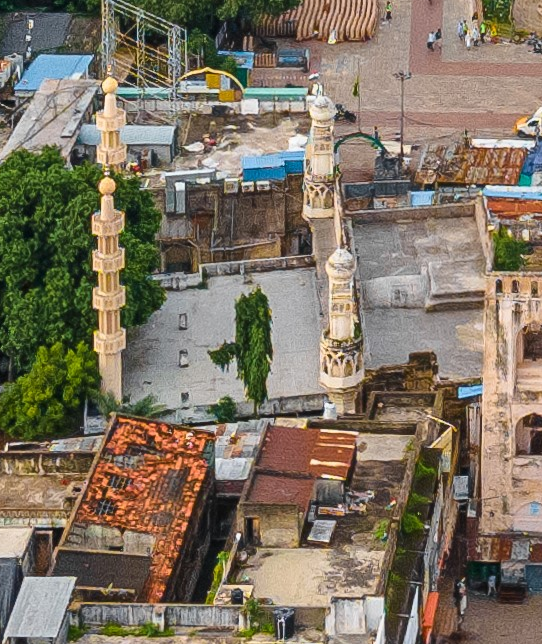
Aerial view of the mosque.

The mosque is an important example of early Qutb Shahi architecture, and displays Mughal influences in its design. Situated to the northeast of the Charminar, it is surrounded by haphazardly constructed shops which encroach upon the mosque. It is accessible through a portal of the pillar-and-lintel form, consisting of an entrance arch, upon which a cusped arch is superimposed. The portal leads to a narrow lane, from which one approaches the side of the mosque from the west, and this is an unusual feature of the mosque. The mosque stands at the western end of a paved rectangular courtyard, which measures approximately 23 by 21 metres (74 by 70 ft). The courtyard contains a cistern at its north-eastern end, as well as a hammam, which is now in ruins. A narrow colonnade runs along the northern side of the courtyard. It is built in the pillar-and-lintel form, and consists of nine openings.

The façade features seven arches, each composed of two sections. The lower section of each arch is an arched entrance. The upper section is superimposed upon this entrance, approximately 0.91 metres (3 ft) higher, and rests on struts that project from the piers. The central arch is wider and taller than the others, almost reaching the top of the facade, and its upper section consists of a pointed arch. In contrast, the upper sections of the remaining six arches are cusped, similar to the entrance portal. A stone chajja resting upon brackets runs above the arches. Finally, an ornamental parapet rises above the façade.

Each front corner has circular buttresses, upon which the front minarets are placed. The minarets are square, each topped with a small tomb-like structure. Their design, featuring galleried circular tops, marks an important step in the development of the Qutb Shahi minaret. The short height of the minarets was perhaps deliberate, in order to emphasize the loftiness of the nearby Char Kaman and Charminar.

The interior consists of a double hall, measuring 22.10 metres (72 ft 6 in) long and 9.91 metres (32 ft 6 in) wide. The flat roof of the prayer-hall is supported by a row of arches resting upon pillars. The mosque can accommodate approximately 750 worshippers.

=== Inscriptions ===
A Persian inscription in the Nastaliq script is carved, in three lines, onto a black basalt tablet above the main entrance. It contains verses praising Allah, and notes that the mosque was constructed under the supervision of a nobleman named Amin-ul-Mulk. It contains a chronogram, dating the mosque to 1006 AH (1597/1598 CE). This inscription is considered to be of very high calligraphical merit, and is praised by scholars including H. K. Sherwani and Ghulam Yazdani, the latter of whom calls it "finest example of the Nastaliq script in the Deccan", and says that it may compare favorably with the best calligraphic specimens of other countries.

The second inscription is located in the western wall of the prayer hall, running along the sides of the mihrab, and above it. It contains the verses 137 and 138 of the second chapter of the Quran, inscribed in the Thuluth script, along with the name of the artist and the year of inscription.

== See also ==
- Islam in India
- List of mosques in Telangana
