= Jama Mosque, Erandol =

Mosque in Erandol, Maharashtra, India

Jama Mosque
- Location of the mosque in Maharashtra

Religion
- Affiliation: Islam
- Ecclesiastical or organizational status: Friday mosque
- Status: Active

Location
- Location: Erandol, Jalgaon, Maharashtra
- Country: India
- Interactive map of Jama Mosque
- Coordinates: 20°55′15″N 75°19′29″E

Architecture
- Founder: Alauddin Khilji, Delhi Sultanate
- Completed: 1861 (as a mosque)
- Materials: Stone

The Jama Masjid is a disputed Friday mosque, located in Erandol, in the Jalgaon district of the state of Maharashtra, India. The mosque is believed to date from the 13th-century, built during the reign of Alauddin Khilji, the Sultan of Delhi. However, the earliest documented use of the building as a mosque was in 1861.

== Overview ==
The building has the form of a large quadrangle surrounded by a wall with inscriptions of Quranic verses and with windows with stone lattice work of various patterns. On either side of the mehrab are arched recesses surrounded by varied scroll work, with the crescent and star on the tops of each. The central masjid has a massive roof of great blocks and beams of stone that bear traces of red and yellow colouring, supported on large stone pillars ornamented with flowers.

A longstanding dispute over whether the building is a mosque or a Jain temple, called Pandav Wada by devout Hindus, was determined in the Supreme Court of India on 19 April 2024. The mosque's administration was ordered to hand keys of the building to the local municipal authorities. The order authorised the local council to allow Hindus to enter the building at any time, and to restrict entry to Muslims until before namaz, and close the building shortly thereafter. An appeal was dismissed.

== See also ==
- Islam in India
- List of mosques in India
