= Khairatabad Mosque =

Mosque in Hyderabad, Telangana, India

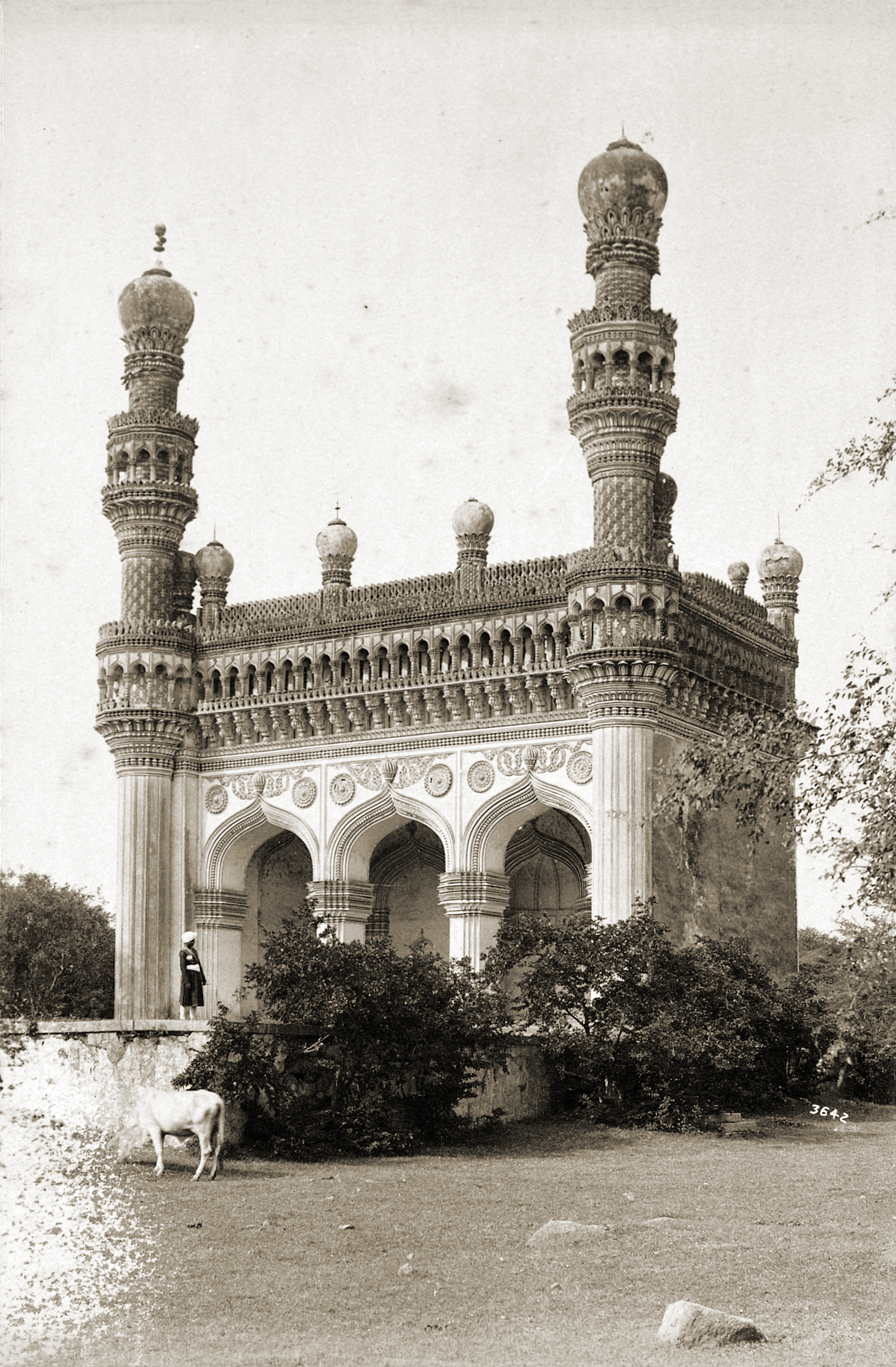
- The mosque in c. 1880s, photographed by Lala Deen Dayal

Religion
- Affiliation: Islam
- Ecclesiastical or organizational status: Mosque and empty tomb
- Status: Active

Location
- Location: Khairatabad, Hyderabad, Hyderabad District, Telangana
- Country: India

Architecture
- Type: Mosque architecture
- Style: Qutb Shahi
- Founder: Khairunisa Begum
- Groundbreaking: 1612 Common EraCE
- Completed: 1626 CE

Specifications
- Dome: One (tomb only)
- Minaret: Two

The Khairatabad Mosque is a mosque and adjacent tomb, located in Khairatabad, Hyderabad, in the Hyderabad district of the state of Telangana, India. The mosque was completed in the 17th century. In the late 20th century, the Khairatabad area became a major business and IT hub of Hyderabad.

== History ==
The Khairatabad Mosque was completed in 1626 CE by Khairunisa Begum, also known as Ma Saheba, daughter of VI Sultan Muhammad Qutb Shah (1612–1626 CE). She built the mosque for her tutor, Akhund Mulla Abul Malik. There is an empty domed tomb building, located adjacent to the mosque. The tomb building is devoid of any grave as it was built by Akhund for self-burial. However, as he died during his Haj pilgrimage to Mecca, the domed tomb building has remained vacant.

Khairunisa Begum asked his son-in-law, Hussain Shah Wali, to construct a palace, a mosque and a tank for the princess. The tank later became famous as Hussain Sagar built in the northern boundary of Khairtabad.

== Architecture ==
The Khairatabad Mosque was designed and constructed by Hussain Shah Wali. The mosque has a three-arch opening in front. The slender minarets of the mosque have a large amount of decorative work and the Jali work is worth seeing.

INTACH AP, India declared the mosque as a heritage site.

== See also ==
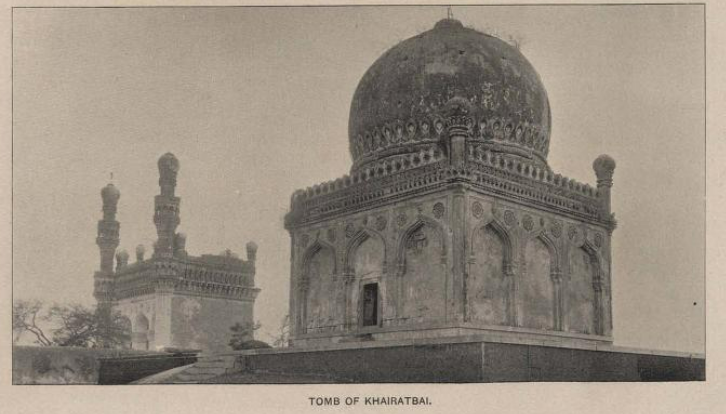
Khairatabad mosque and tomb

- Islam in India
- List of mosques in Telangana
