= Mian Mishk Mosque =

Former mosque in Hyderabad, Telangana, India

Mian Mishk Masjid
- Masjid-e-Miya Misk
- Location of the mosque in Hyderabad

Religion
- Affiliation: Islam (former}
- Ecclesiastical or organizational status: Mosque (former}
- Status: Abandoned (partial ruinous state)

Location
- Location: Purana Pul, Hyderabad, Hyderabad District, Telangana
- Interactive map of Mian Mishk Masjid
- Coordinates: 17°22′10″N 78°27′30″E

Architecture
- Type: Mosque architecture
- Style: Qutb Shahi
- Founder: Mian Mishk
- Completed: 1674 CE
- Minaret: Two (maybe more)

The Mian Mishk Masjid, also known as the Masjid-e-Miya Misk, is a former mosque in a partial ruinous state, located near Purana Pul in Hyderabad, Hyderabad District, in the state of Telangana, India.

== Overview ==
It was built during the reign of Qutb Shahi period in the 17th century by Mian Mishk, a noble of Abdullah Qutb Shah, the sixth king of Golconda.

It has a garam hamam, which offers a hot bath, complying with the Islamic principle of hygiene and purification.

It is among the 137 heritage list of Hyderabad Urban Development Authority, but is not part of Archaeological Survey of India. Since 2018, there were numerous media reports that the former mosque was in a neglected and ruinous state.

An inscription over the western gateway dates the mosque from 1674.

== See also ==
- Islam in India
- List of mosques in Telangana
- Heritage structures in Hyderabad
