= Deval Masjid =

Former mosque and former Hindu temple in Bodhan, Telangana, India

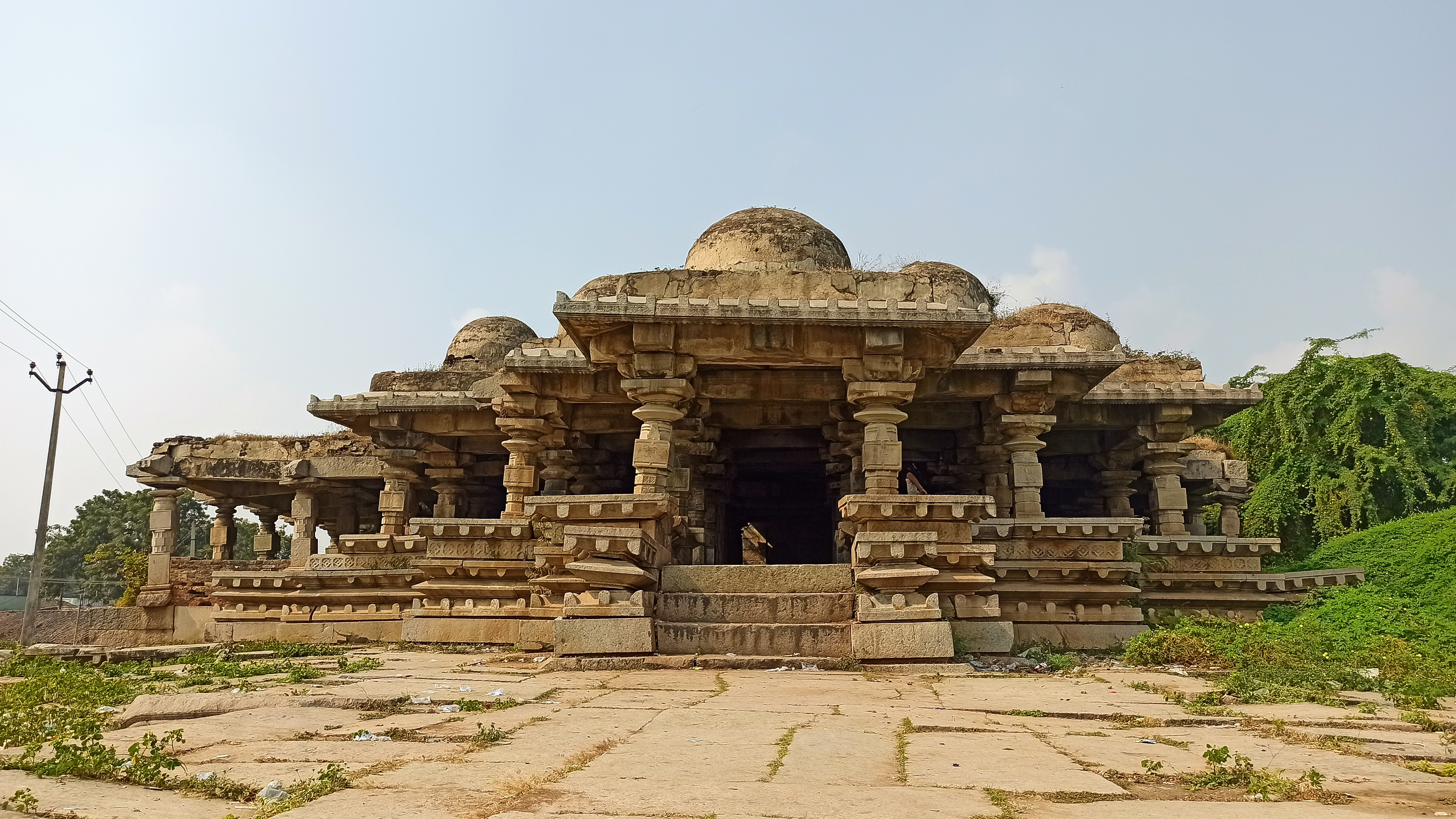
- Partial ruins of the former temple and mosque, in 2020

- Location of the former temple and mosque in Telangana

Religion
- Affiliation: Buddhism / Jainism (possibly former); Hinduism (former); Islam (former)
- Ecclesiastical or organisational status: Temple (c. 12th–14th century); Mosque (14th century–????)
- Status: Abandoned; (partial ruinous state)

Location
- Location: Bodhan, Nizamabad district, Telangana
- Country: India
- Coordinates: 18°39′49″N 77°53′07″E

Architecture
- Type: Hindu temple architecture
- Style: Kakatiya (12th century); Indo-Islamic (14th century)
- Completed: c. 12th century CE; Kakatiya era

Specifications
- Dome: 12
- Inscriptions: Several
- Materials: Stone

Bodhan is home to an ancient historical monument locally known as the Vanda Stambhala Gudi (“Hundred-pillared temple”), located in the Udmeer Gally area of the town. This site, now referred to as Deva Masjid, was originally been The Indranarayana Swamy Temple ( Hindu Temple) constructed in the 12th–13th century during the Kakatiya era. The pillared hall — noted for its numerous stone pillars — remains a prominent feature and is the reason for its local name. It was later converted into a mosque in the 14th century during the Delhi Sultanate period under Muhammad bin Tughluq’s expansion. The site is listed as a state protected monument under the Telangana Heritage Act.

== History ==
The temple was constructed in the late 12th or early 13th century, during the reign of the Kakatiya kingdom. Ghulam Yazdani posits that it might have been a Buddhist or Jain temple before being used as Hindu temple, based on the imagery of all three religions being found in and around the temple.

In the 14th century, the region was invaded and taken over by Ulugh Khan, a general of the Delhi Sultanate, who would later become its sultan. In 1323, Ulugh Khan encamped in Bodhan, and a contemporary account by Abdul Malik Isami mentions that he laid siege to the fort of Bodhan for approximately two to three months. The report further states that the chief of Bodhan surrendered, converted to Islam with his family, and was granted amnesty. The style of the mosque does not correspond with other Tughluq architecture of the Deccan. Richard M. Eaton posited that the chief of Bodhan converted the temple into a mosque himself.

== Architecture ==
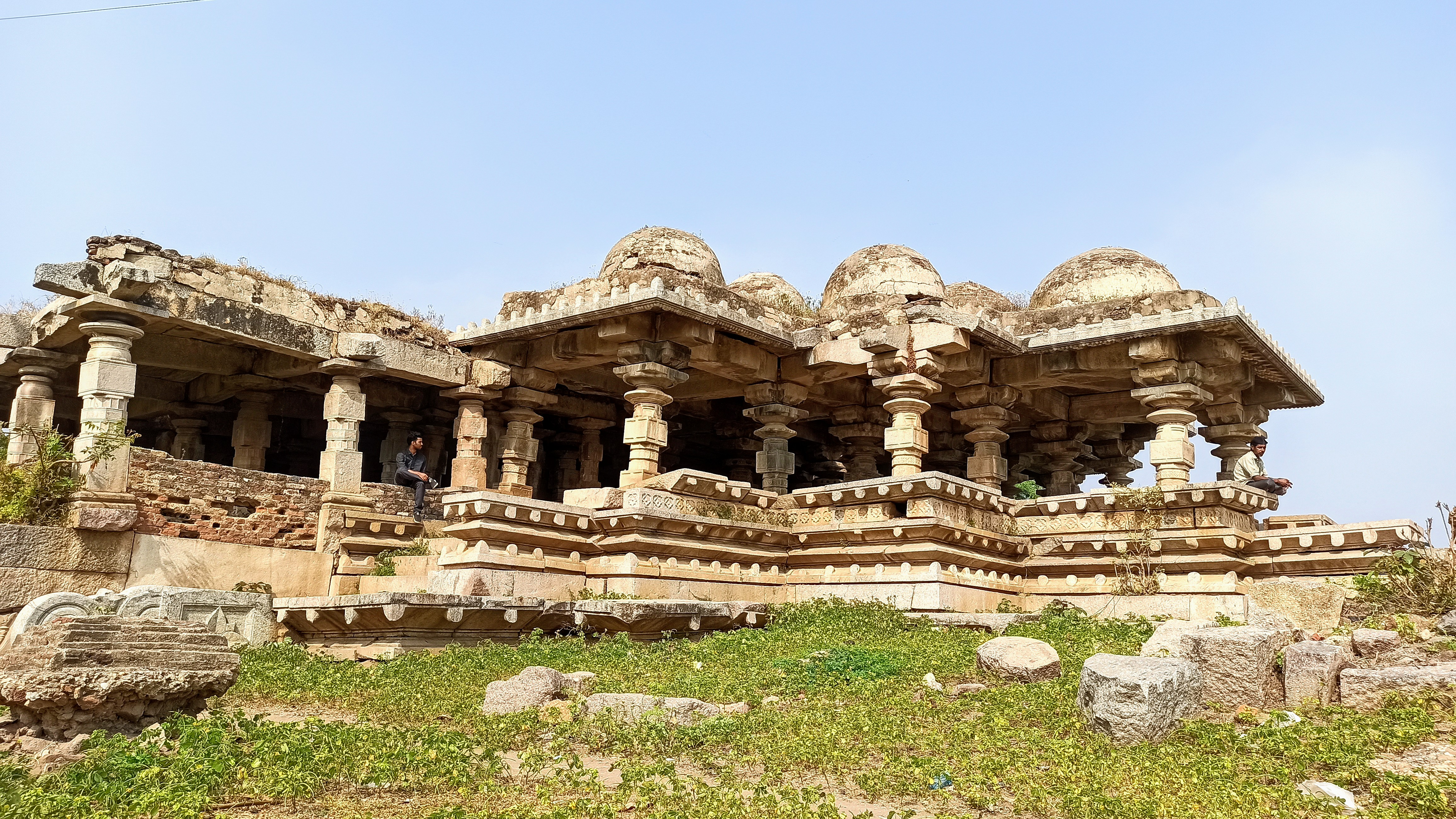
The pillared hall, surmounted by several small brick domes, served as a pavilion leading to the prayer-hall.

The temple had a star-shaped plan, and it was composed of a garbhagriha (sanctum), antarala (antechamber), and mandapa (pillared hall). While the sanctum and antechamber were converted into a prayer-hall, the pillared hall remains almost completely intact, and serves as a pavilion leading up to the prayer-hall. Twelve small domes, made out of brick, were added on the roof of the pillared hall. The large number of domes is unusual for Tughluq mosques, and were probably included in order to give the building a more Indo-Islamic appearance.

The pillared hall is divided into nine bays and contains porches in the middle of its northern, eastern, and southern sides. It stands upon a plinth, and is accessible by flights of steps with balustrades on the northern and southern sides. The prayer-hall is divided into forty-five bays. The central bay is elaborately carved, and images of Narasimha can be found at its four corners. The western wall was closed up using rubble. A mihrab (prayer-niche) is carved into the western wall, and a minbar (pulpit) stands to its north. The building is surrounded by a wall built out of dressed stone, with four entrances facing the four cardinal points.

== See also ==
- Islam in India
- Hinduism in India
- List of mosques in India
- List of Hindu temples in India
- List of State Protected Monuments in Telangana
