= Saidabad Mosque =

Mosque in Hyderabad, Telangana, India

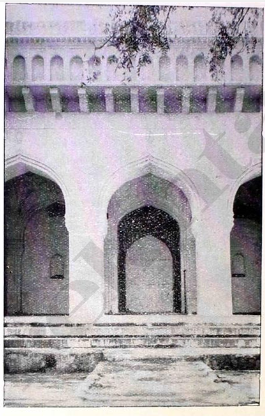
- The mosque in 1941

Religion
- Affiliation: Islam
- Ecclesiastical or organizational status: Mosque
- Status: Active

Location
- Location: Hyderabad, Hyderabad District, Telangana

Architecture
- Type: Mosque architecture
- Founder: Mir Mu'min Astarabadi
- Established: 1014 AH (1605/1606 CE)
- Materials: Basalt

The Saidabad Mosque is a mosque in Hyderabad, in the Hyderabad district of the state of Telangana, India. The mosque was completed in the early part of the 17th century.

== History ==
The mosque was commissioned by Mir Mu'min Astarabadi. Along with the mosque was a quadrangle with fifty-six rooms. It might have served as a caravanserai, or as lodging for students and teachers of a madrasa.

== Architecture ==
The prayer hall measures 9.1 by 6.4 metres (30 by 21 ft), and the façade contains three arched entrances.

The mihrab is made out of black basalt. Over it is an inscription in the Thuluth script. 1014 AH (1605/1606 CE) is given in the inscription as the date of the mosque's erection. The Shia durood is carved on either side of the niche.

== See also ==
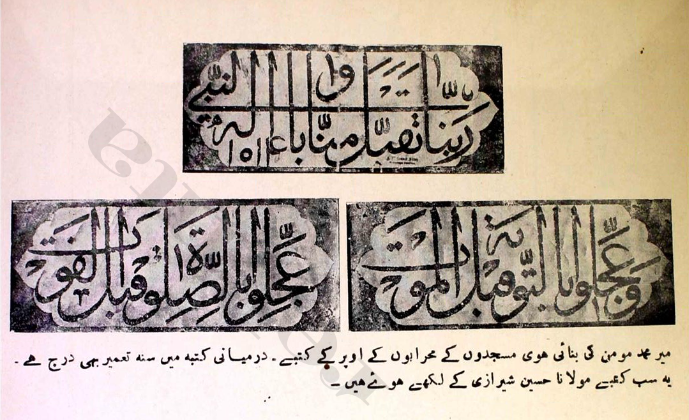
Inscriptions from the mosque

- Islam in India
- List of mosques in Telangana
