= Jama Mosque, Golconda =

Mosque in Hyderabad, Telangana, India

Jami Mosque (Safa Masjid)
- صفا مسجد
- Location of the mosque in Hyderabad

Religion
- Affiliation: Islam
- Ecclesiastical or organizational status: Friday mosque
- Status: Active

Location
- Location: Golconda, Hyderabad, Hyderabad District, Telangana
- Country: India
- Interactive map of Jami Mosque (Safa Masjid)
- Coordinates: 17°23′03″N 78°24′14″E

Architecture
- Type: Mosque architecture
- Style: Bahmani
- Founder: Quli Qutb Mulk
- Completed: 924 AH (1518/1519 CE)

Specifications
- Dome: One
- Minaret: Two

The Jama Masjid, originally named as Safa Masjid (Arabic: صفا مسجد), is a Friday mosque located in Golconda, Hyderabad, in the Hyderabad district of the state of Telangana, India. It was constructed in 1518 CE by the first Qutb Shahi ruler, Sultan Quli Qutb Shah, while he was governor of the Bahmani Sultanate in current Telangana.

== History ==
In 924 AH (1518/1519 CE) Sultan Quli Qutb Shah (later the first Qutb Shahi ruler), a governor of Telangana under the Bahmani sultan Mahmood Shah Bahmani II, rebuilt the mud-fort of Golconda and named the city as Muhammad Nagar, During the same year the mosque was constructed as "Safa Masjid" later to be known as Jama Masjid, Golconda. In 1543 CE, Sultan Quli was assassinated in this mosque while in prayers by Mir Mahmud Hamadani, Quiladar of Golconda fort who was instigated by heir apparent Jamsheed Quli Qutb Shah son of Sultan Quli.

== Architecture ==
The mosque and Golconda Fort were planned to be a part of a larger city named Mohammed Nagar ( a new name given to Golconda by Sultan Quli Qutb Shah). It is the only mosque constructed during Bahmani reign in the form of Bahmani style of architecture in Hyderabad. The mosque consist of single dome over the entrance gateway, courtyard floor is paved with granite slabs, a large hall divided into four aisles and five arches.

== See also ==
- Islam in India
- List of mosques in Telangana
