= Gülsüm =

Gülsüm is a Turkish female given name that means someone with a chubby face; Turkish spelling of the Arabic name Kulthum.

== Given name ==
=== Gülsüm ===
- Gülsüm Alkan, Turkish actress
- Gülsüm Cengiz, Turkish poet
- Gülsüm Güleçyüz (born 1993), Turkish handballer
- Gülsüm Kav (born 1971), Turkish feminist
- Gülsüm Sayar, Turkish actress
- Gülsüm Tatar (born 1985), Turkish boxer
- Ümmügülsüm Sultan, name of multiple Ottoman princesses

=== Gulsum ===
- Gulsum Asfendiyarova (1880-1937), Kazakh medical doctor

== See also ==
- Kulthum
- Umm Kulthum (name)
