= Kav =

Kav or KAV could refer to:

- Kaspersky Anti-Virus, antivirus software
- Katukína-Kanamarí language, indigenous Katukinan language spoken in Brazil
- Kav Sandhu, British musician
- Kav Temperley, Australian musician
- Gülsüm Kav, Turkish women's rights activist
