= Premamati Mosque =

Mosque in Hyderabad, Telangana, India

Premamati Mosque (Qutb Shahi Masjid)
- प्रेमामति मस्जिद / مسجد بريما ماتي
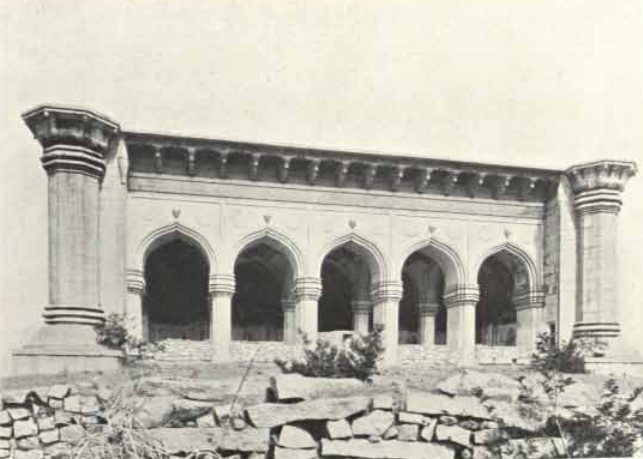
- The five-arched facade of the Premamati Mosque, in c. 1924

- Location of the mosque in Hyderabad

Religion
- Affiliation: Sunni Islam
- Ecclesiastical or organizational status: Congregational mosque
- Status: Active

Location
- Location: Ibrahim Bagh, Hyderabad, Telangana
- Country: India
- Interactive map of Premamati Mosque (Qutb Shahi Masjid)
- Coordinates: 17°22′46″N 78°22′47″E

Architecture
- Type: Mosque
- Style: Qutb Shahi
- Founder: Ibrahim Quli Qutb Shah
- Established: 1560; 466 years ago
- Completed: 1610; 416 years ago

Specifications
- Height (max): 38 feet (12 metres)
- Dome: 10
- Minaret: 2
- Materials: Pink granite

The Premamati Mosque (also known as Pema Mati Mosque, Ibrahim Bagh Mosque, or Qutb Shahi Masjid) is a 16th-century mosque located in the Ibrahim Bagh area of Hyderabad, India. Built during the reign of Ibrahim Quli Qutb Shah, it is historically significant as the architectural precursor to the grand Makkah Masjid and for its role in the aborted urban planning of the Golconda Sultanate.

In 2014, UNESCO placed the mosque on its "tentative list" to become a World Heritage Site, with others in the region, under the name Monuments and Forts of the Deccan Sultanate.

== History ==
The mosque was commissioned during the reign of Ibrahim Quli Qutb Shah (r. 1550–1580). It was originally intended to serve as the Jama Masjid (congregational mosque) for a new city planned in the Ibrahim Bagh area, west of Golconda Fort. However, the plan for the new city was abandoned due to the lack of a sustainable water source. This eventually led his successor, Muhammad Quli Qutb Shah, to establish the city of Hyderabad further east on the banks of the Musi River in 1591.

While the primary structure of the mosque was built in the 1560s, the mosque remained in a state of semi-completion for decades as the new city of Hyderabad was being built a few kilometres away. It was not until the early 17th century that the mosque was finalised for use, when it was completed to serve as a scaled-down prototype of the monumental Makkah Masjid whose construction started in 1617. The royal architects used the Ibrahim Bagh site to test the structural integrity of massive granite arches and vast, dome-less vaulted ceilings before committing resources to the much larger Makkah Masjid project in the city center of Hyderabad.

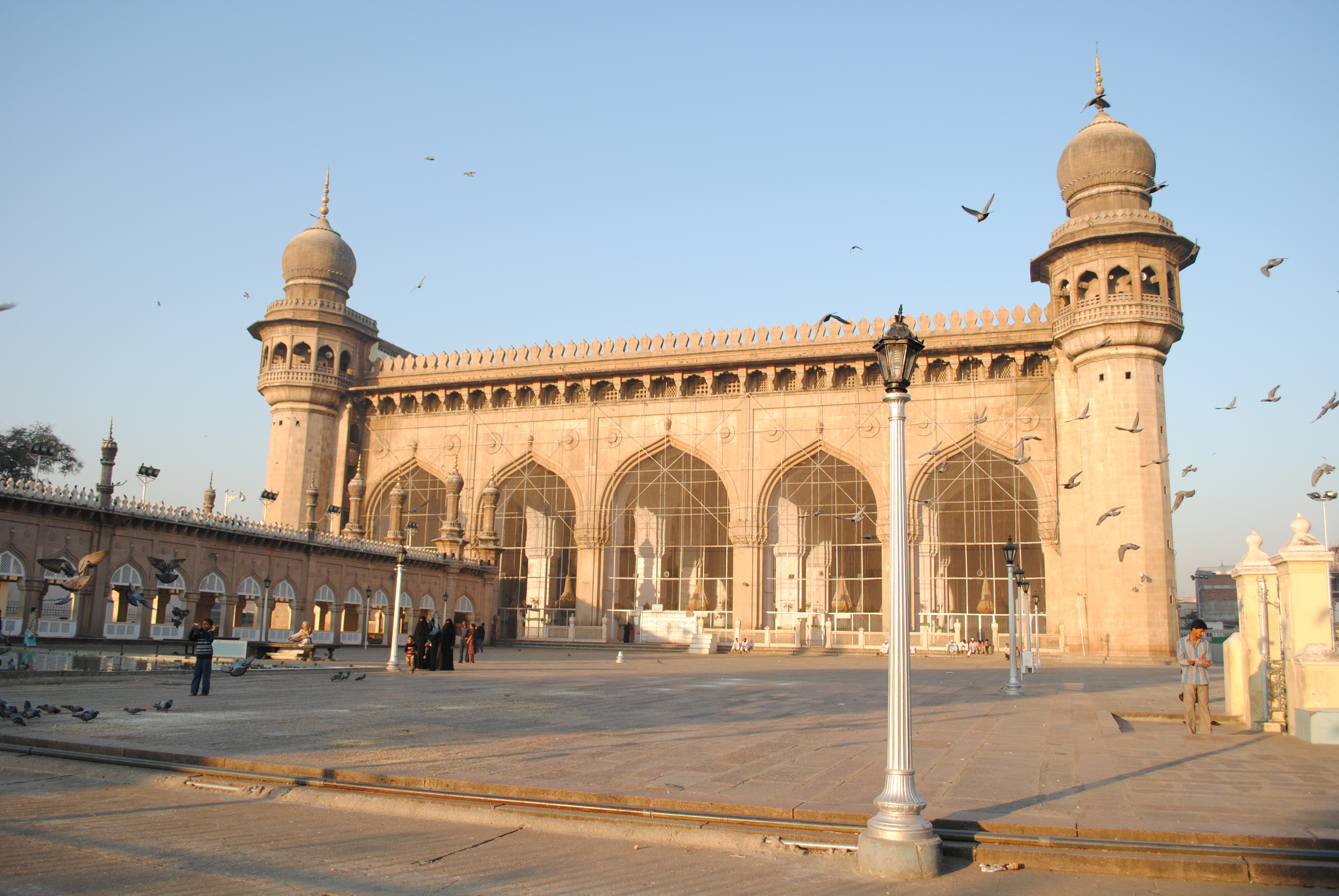
Architecture of the much larger Mecca Masjid (Makkah Masjid) in Hyderabad is nearly identical to that of the Premamati Mosque. The Mecca Masjid started construction in 1617, during the reign of Muhammad Qutb Shah, and was completed by Aurangzeb in 1694.

The mosque was renovated by the Telangana Department of Archaeology and Museums in 2016 at an expense of Rs. 50 lakhs. The renovation included repairs to the roof, platform, and cellar, and the installation of lights to illuminate the mosque’s facade at night.

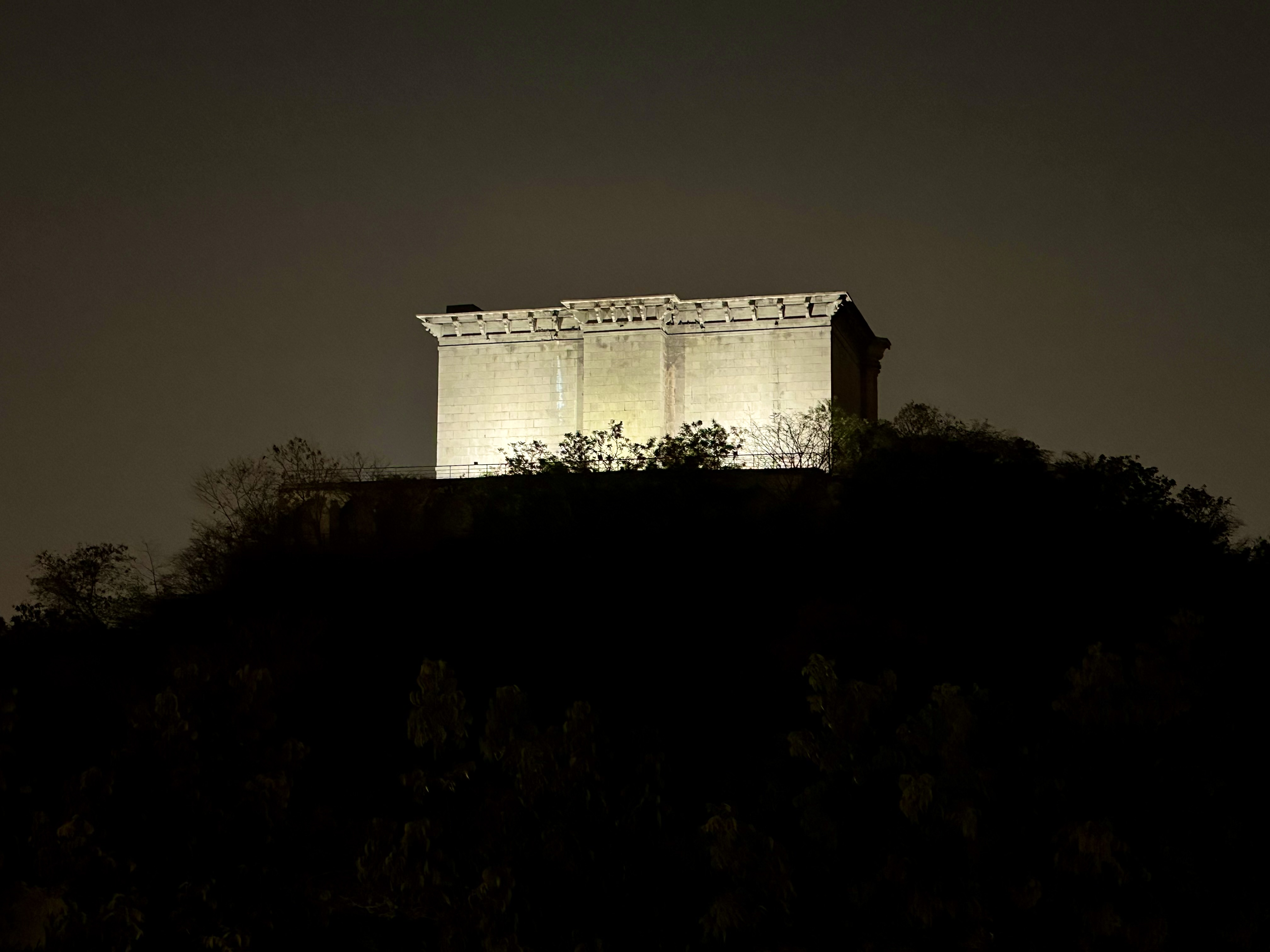
Premamati Mosque’s western facade (rear) at night

== Etymology ==
The mosque is commonly associated with Premamati (or Pema Mati), a Hindu consort of the seventh Qutb Shahi Sultan, Abdullah Qutb Shah (r. 1626–1672). According to local folklore, the structure was frequented by the Sultan and his consort and thereby it came to be known as the Premamati Mosque. Upon her death in 1662, Premamati was buried in a dedicated mausoleum within the Qutb Shahi Tombs complex 1.5 kilometres (1 mile) away, with the phrase "Pema Mati was verily a rose of Paradise from Eternity" carved in Arabic on her grave.

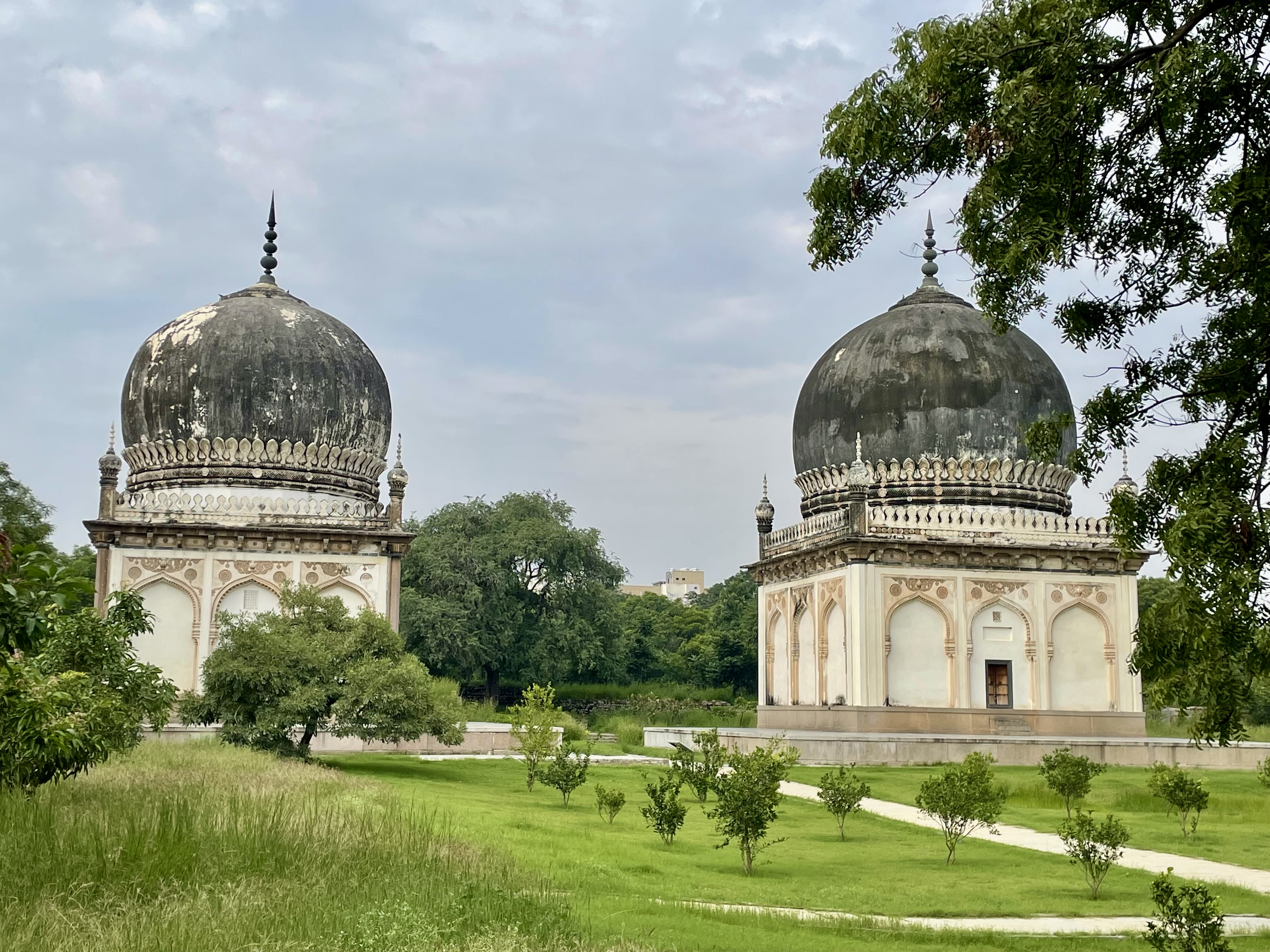
Tombs of Taramati (left) and Premamati (right) at the Qutb Shahi Tombs complex

While the romantic story of the Sultan's devotion to his consort is deeply rooted in Hyderabad's oral history, there is a lack of contemporary literary evidence or inscriptions on the building to definitively confirm her connection to the mosque itself. The association relies largely on the mosque's proximity to other structures linked to the Sultan's consorts, such as the Baradari of Tara Mati.

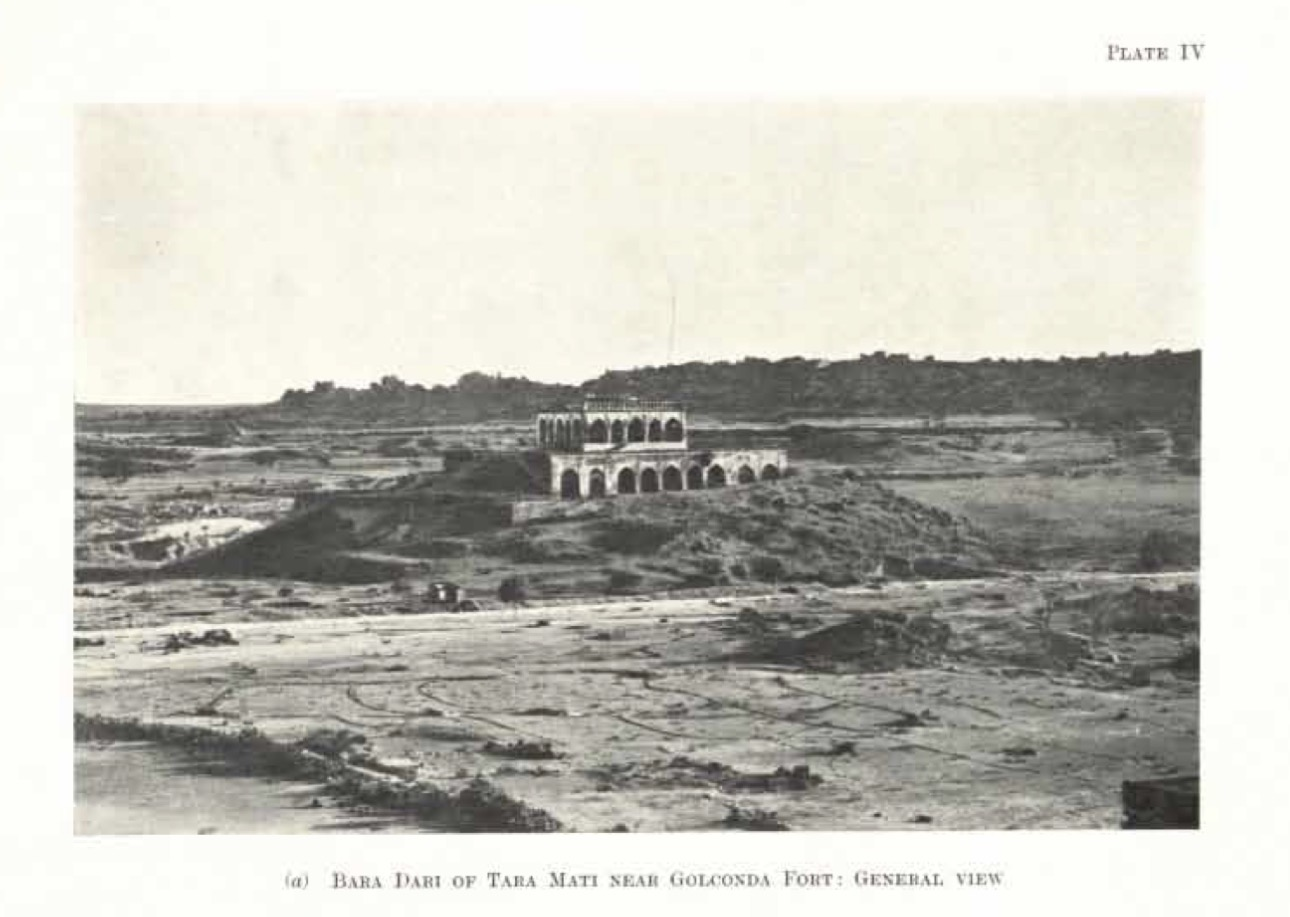
View of Taramati Baradari from the hilltop Premamati Mosque, photographed in 1924

== Architecture ==
The mosque is situated on a rocky hillock along the Osman Sagar Road. The mosque complex is spread over an area of 11 acres, which includes a narrow pedestrian path leading uphill to the mosque.

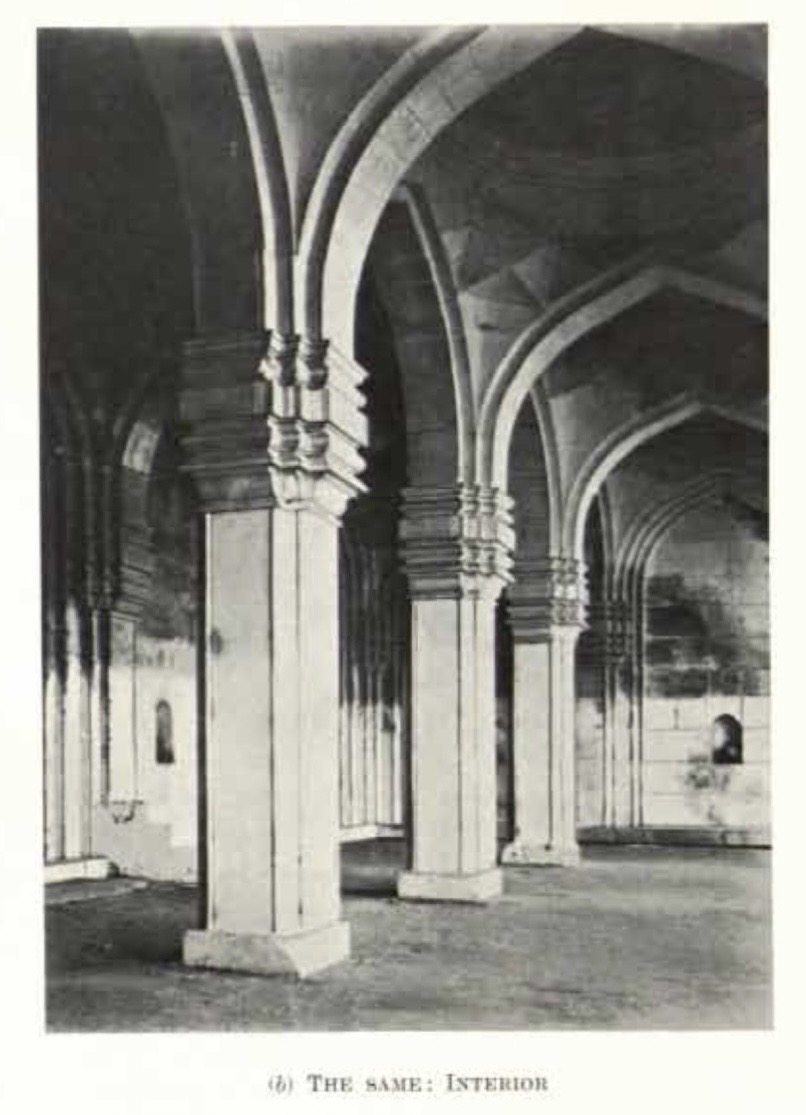
The vaulted ceiling, domes, and Gothic columns of the mosque, photographed in 1924

- Terrace and Layout: The structure sits on a nearly square elevated terrace, measuring 143 feet (44 metres) on each side. The mosque itself occupies the western end of this terrace.
- Facade: The eastern hall features a screen of five arches supported by carved piers, as is typical of Qutb Shahi mosques. These piers are decorated with a distinct band of mouldings and a "frizzle" design reminiscent of medieval Hindu architectural styles, specifically those found at the Ramappa Temple and the Aundha Nagnath Temple.
- Roof and Domes: A unique feature of the mosque is its roof, which contains ten flat domes. These domes are "buried" within the thickness of the roof and are not visible from the exterior, giving the building a flat-topped appearance.
- Interior: The interior is described as having a "Gothic" feel due to the lofty piers and circular flutings. The Mihrab (prayer niche) is located in the center of the west wall and consists of a rectangular ante-chamber with a vaulted ceiling and walls decorated with incised plaster arches.
- Minarets: The hall is flanked by two semi-decagonal minarets which do not rise beyond the height of the roof.

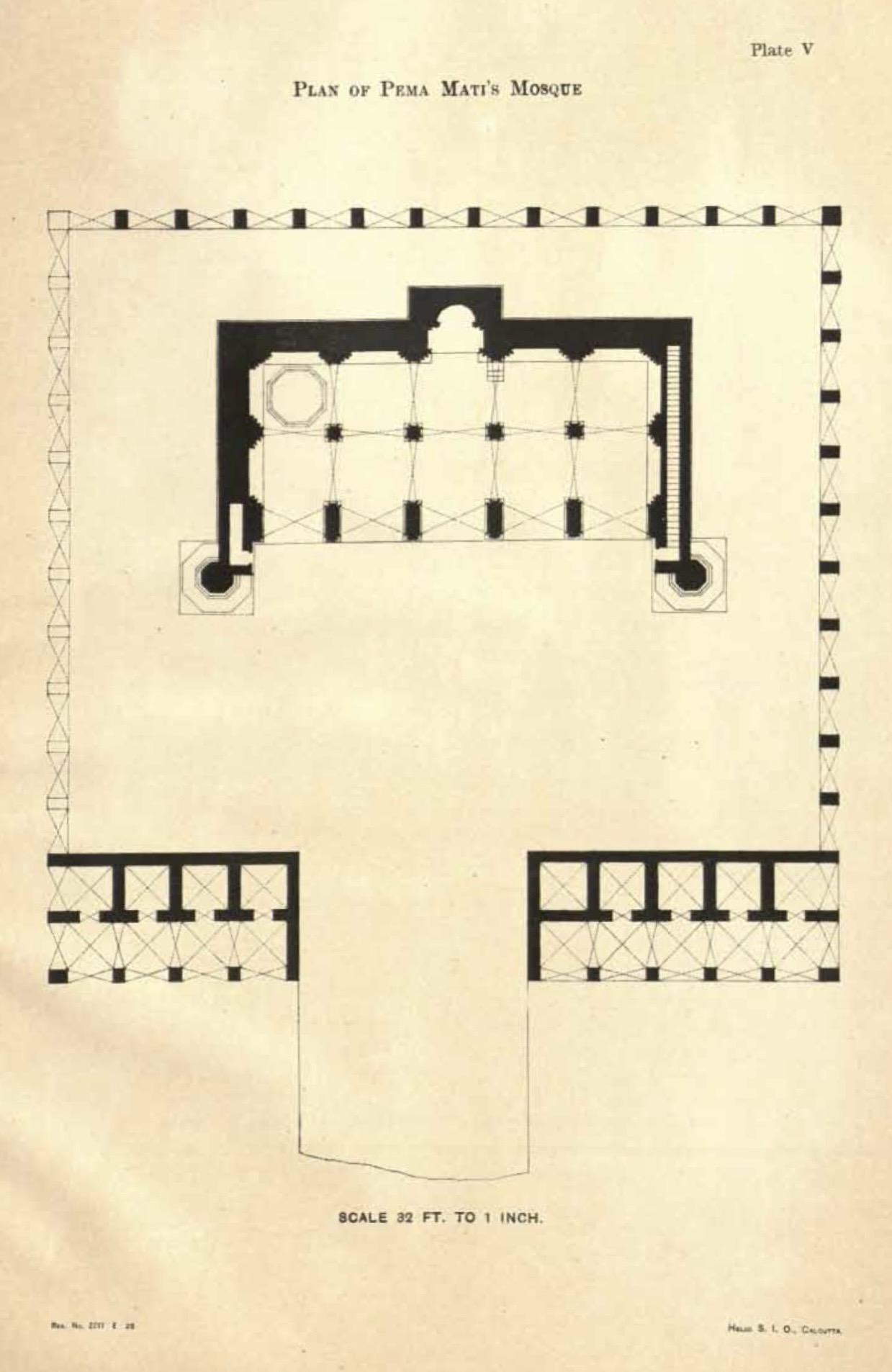
Floor plan of the mosque

Premamati Mosque's architecture departs from the typical architectural style of a mosque in several ways. The structure appears incomplete for a mosque because it lacks the traditional kiosks (chhatris) atop its minars and a finished carved parapet above the eaves (chhajja). The lack of chhatris makes the building appear flat-topped, which is very atypical for mosques which are easily recognisable by their tall, rising minars. Although the Premamati Mosque served as a prototype for the Makkah Masjid (whose alignment towards the Qibla is considered mathematically perfect for its time), the Premamati Mosque sits at a slightly different angle.

The total height of the structure, from the terrace pavement to the chhajja stones, is 38 feet (12 metres).

== Gallery ==
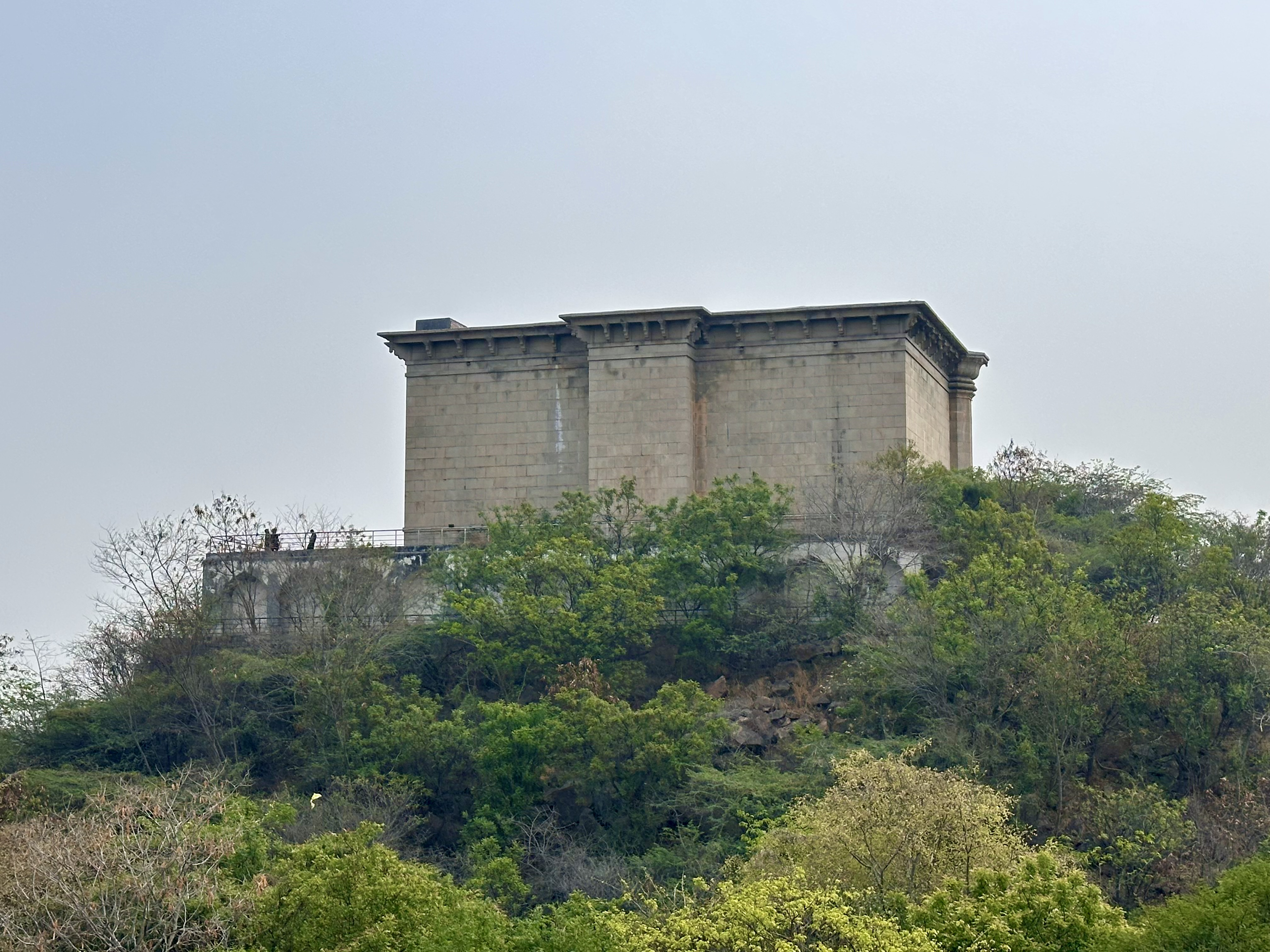
Premamati Mosque viewed from the west

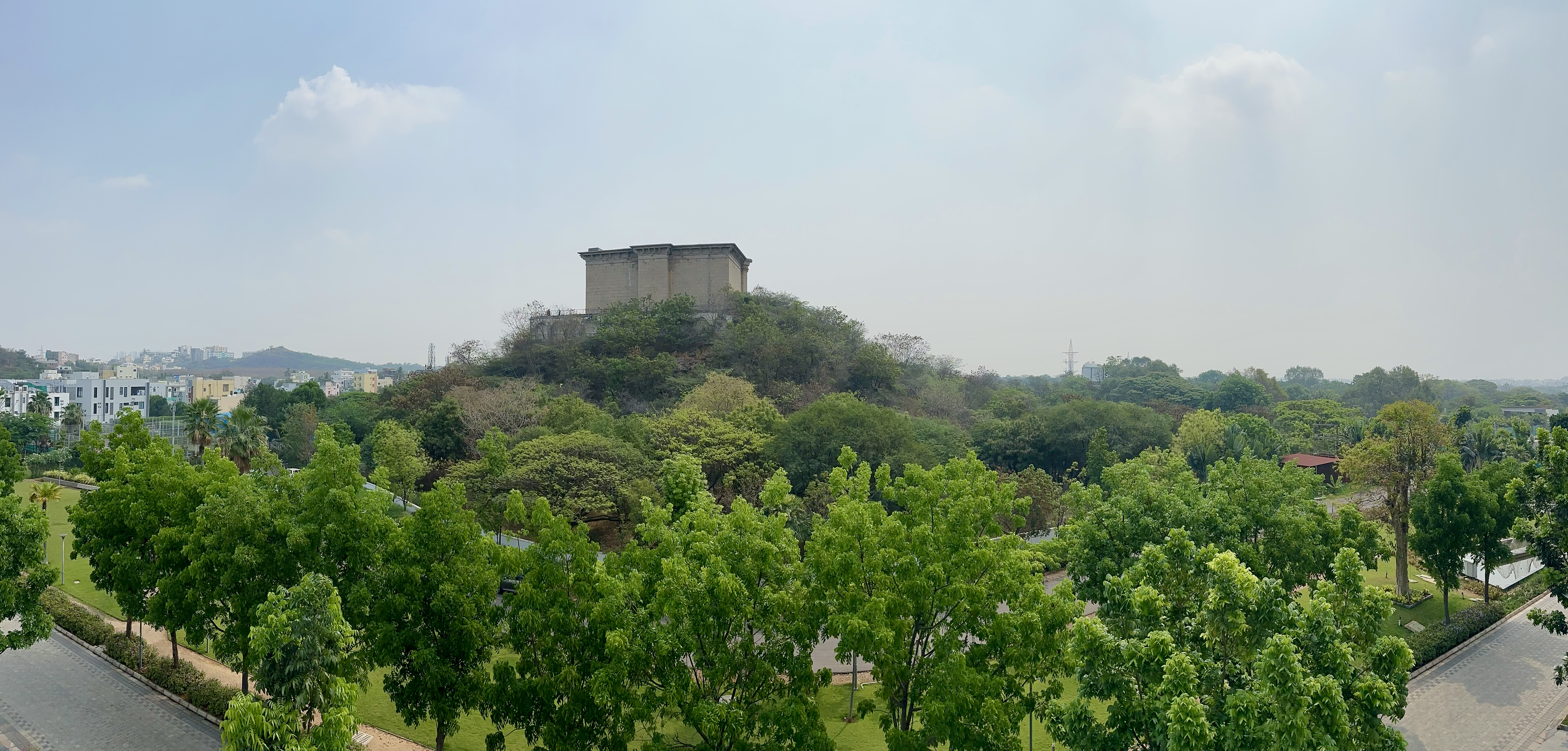
Panoramic view of the western facade of the Premamati Mosque

== See also ==
- Taramati Baradari
- Qutb Shahi Tombs
- Islam in India
- List of mosques in Telangana
