= Kulthum =

Kulthum or Kulsum (Arabic: كلثوم) is an Arabic female given name. It means "someone with a beautiful face" or "someone who comprehends people". It is feminized as "Umm Kulthum" (Kulthum's mother).

People who had this name:

- Umm Kulthum, Egyptian singer and actress
- Kalsoom Nawaz Sharif, the wife of 12th Prime minister of Pakistan, Nawaz Sharif
- Kalsoom Perveen, a Pakistani Politician and a Member of Senate of Pakistan
- Kulsoom Abdullah, a Pakistan American weightlifter
- Kulsum Zamani Begum (1832–1902), Indian princess, daughter of Bahadur Shah Zafar the last Mughal Emperor of India
- Kulsum Begum, builder of the Kulsum Begum Masjid, 17th-century princess of the Golconda Sultanate in southern India

People using it in their matronymic/patronymic or surname include:

- Amr ibn Kulthum

== See also ==
- Umm Kulthum (name)
- Kalsoom
- Kulthum (crater), on Mercury
- Arabic name
