= Toli Masjid =

Mosque in Hyderabad, Telangana, India

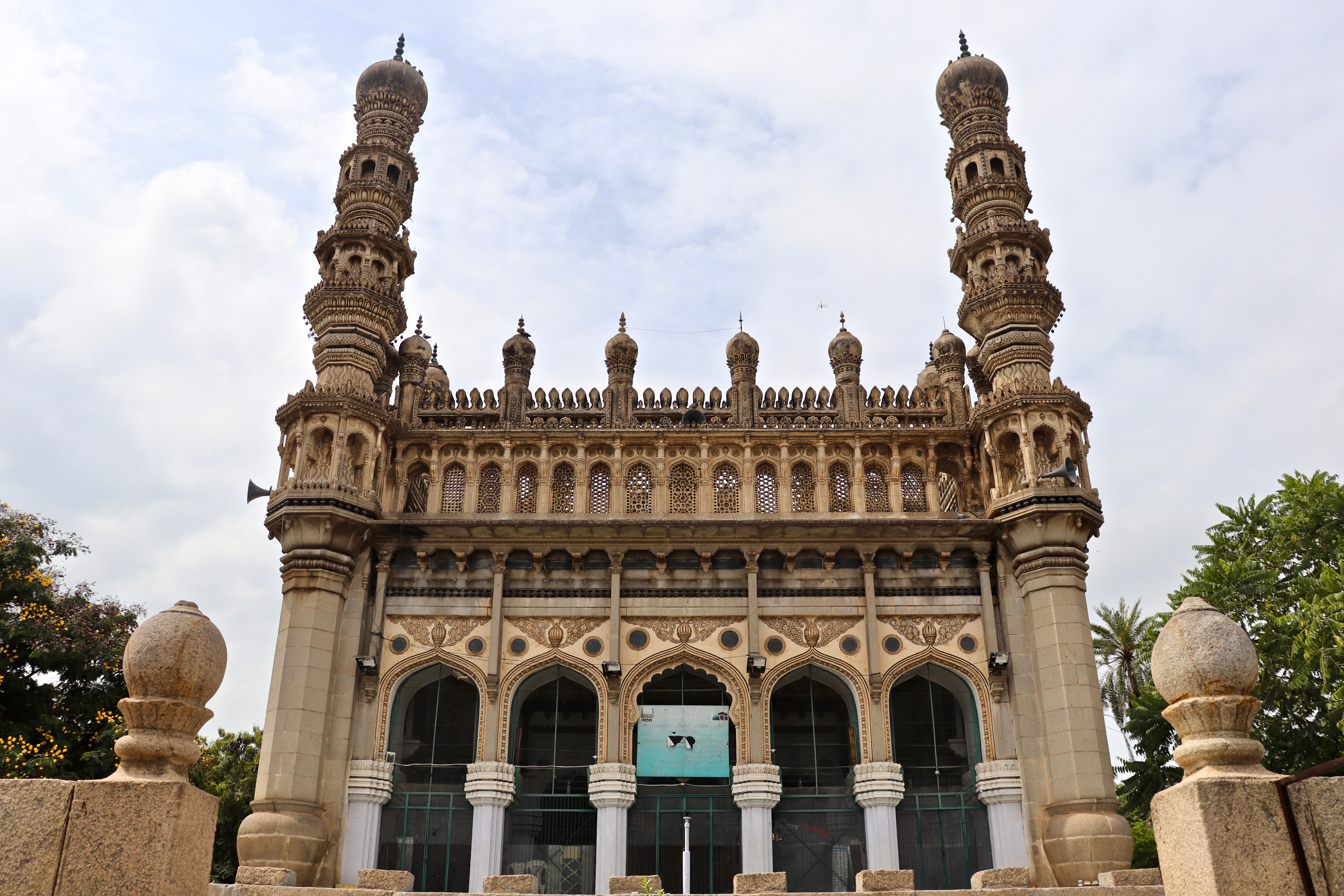
- The mosque in [YYYY]

- Location of the mosque in Hyderabad

Religion
- Affiliation: Islam
- Ecclesiastical or organizational status: Mosque
- Status: Active

Location
- Location: Golconda Road, Karwan, Hyderabad, Hyderabad District, Telangana
- Interactive map of Toli Masjid
- Coordinates: 17°22′29″N 78°26′20″E

Architecture
- Type: Mosque architecture
- Style: Qutb Shahi
- Completed: 1082 AH (1671/1672 CE)

Specifications
- Dome: Three
- Minarets: Two (tall); Four (small)
- Minaret height: 18 m (60 ft) (tall)

The Toli Masjid, also known as Damri Masjid, is a mosque in Hyderabad, in the Hyderabad district of the state of Telangana, India. It was constructed during the Qutb Shahi period and completed in 1082 AH (1671/1672 CE).

Built in the distinctive Qutb Shahi style, the mosque displays considerable Hindu influences. Its chief feature is its extensive ornamentation, consisting of latticed screens, chajjas, stucco work, and various other motifs. It is located on the historically significant Karwan road, and was originally set in a garden. The mosque is a state protected monument.

== History ==
The mosque was commissioned by Musa Khan during the reign of Abdullah Qutb Shah, and completed in 1671 CE. Musa Khan was the mahaldar (chamberlain) of Abdullah, as well as a minister and general. According to the historical record Gulzar-e-Asafiyah, when Musa Khan held the construction charge for the Mecca Masjid, he was provided with a discount of one damri per rupee from the building expenditure. He used this amount to construct the Toli Masjid, hence the name. (Note: Both damri and toli refer to the dam, which amounts to one-fortieth of a rupee.)

The mosque is located at Karwan, on the road which connects Golconda Fort to Purana Pul. This road is historically significant as it connected the citadel of Golconda to the newly established city of Hyderabad. It is listed as a state protected monument. The lands endowed to the mosque have been encroached, and the mosque is in a neglected condition.

== Architecture ==
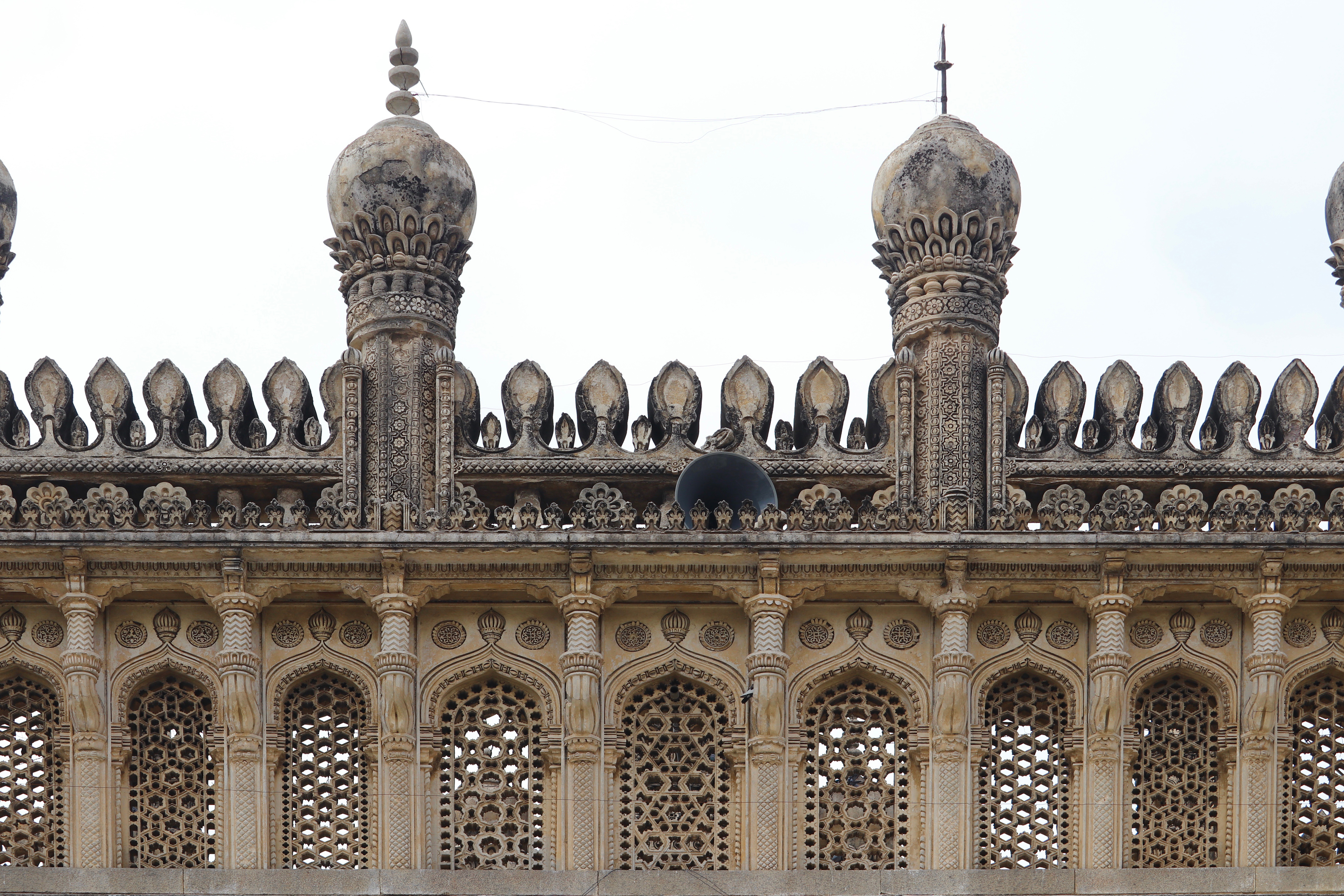
The parapet is adorned with arched windows with jali screens and miniature minarets.

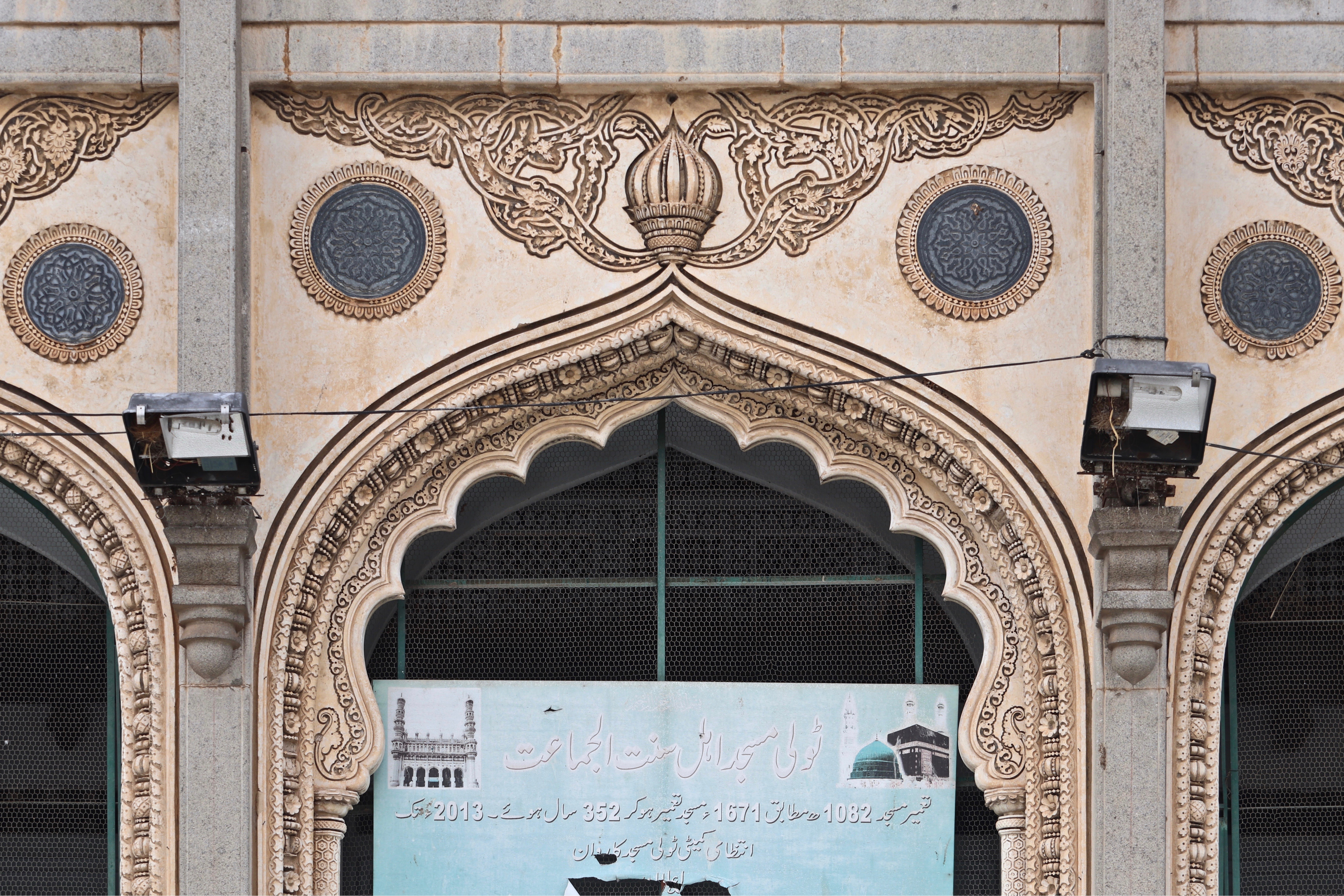
Stucco ornamentation and black basalt medallions above each entrance arch

The Toli Masjid is an example of late Qutb Shahi architecture. Built in the typical Qutb Shahi style, its chief feature is its exuberant decoration, considered a culmination of the decorative tendencies seen in earlier Qutb Shahi mosques.

The mosque displays considerable Hindu influences in its style. These include the use of excessive ornamentation, as well as elements such as elephant-tusk brackets and pot-shaped bases for the two minarets. The niches in the post and lintel style are similar to those in temples used to accommodate images. Additionally, the parapet wall is decorated with miniature minarets just as miniature shikharas are seen in temples.

=== Exterior ===
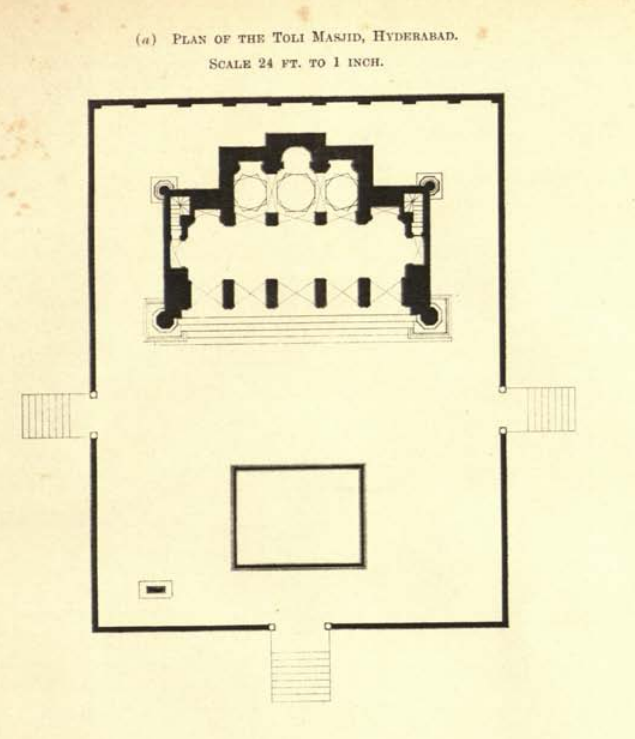
Plan of the Toli Masjid (west-up). The mosque is located at the western side of the courtyard. The flights of steps on three sides, ablution tank in the middle, and Musa Khan's grave at the south-east are also seen.

The Toli Masjid is built on a raised platform with a high plinth, which forms the courtyard of the mosque. This courtyard, about 6 feet (1.8 m) tall, is accessible by flights of steps from the north, south, and east. Musa Khan's grave is situated near the south-eastern end of the courtyard. The mosque building, 4 feet (1.2 m) higher, is located at the western end. The lower part of the building is constructed from ashlar masonry, while the upper part is built out of brick and lime, probably to carry cut-plaster decoration. Granite and black basalt are used for embellishment.

The façade has five arched openings, the central arch being a bit wider and more ornate than the other four. Five-arched façades are common in Qutb Shahi mosques, with the number five symbolizing the Panjtan. Decorative granite columns start at each arch and reach up to the roof. This decoration consists of basalt medallions on either side of the arch, and stucco ornamentation. This is followed by eaves in the form of a chajja, which are supported by beams and brackets. Finally, a double parapet wall rises above the building, consisting of a series of arched windows, decorated with jali work. Miniature minarets rise above the parapet wall.

The façade is flanked by two 18-metre-tall (60 ft) minarets. The pillars at the corners consist of pot-shaped bases, which support octagonal shafts upon which the minarets rise. The minarets have three sets of galleries, and the central gallery is provided with a balcony, decorated with foliate elements. Each minaret is topped by a dome and finial. The ceiling above the inner hall is surmounted by three flattish domes.

The mosque was originally set in a large garden, of which little trace remains. A stepwell is also located within the premises.

=== Interior ===
The mosque is divided into two halls—the outer hall having five arched openings, and the inner having only three. On the western wall of the inner hall, the prayer niche is in the form of a semi-decagon. A Persian inscription in the Naskh script is engraved on the prayer niche. The inscription, translated into English, reads:

For whom is the Kingdom today? For God, the One, the All-powerful.

Musa Khan built this mosque of his

Which was completed in the reign of Shah Abdullah.

As a chronogram of the mosque this was heard (from the Invisible Speaker):

"Built the mosque in the name of God." 1082 AH (1671/1672 CE)

— translated by Ghulam Yazdani

== See also ==
- Islam in India
- List of mosques in Telangana
- List of State Protected Monuments in Telangana
