= Tomb of Amin Khan =

Coordinates: 17°31′50″N 78°15′37″E

Tomb of Abdul Qadir Amin Khan
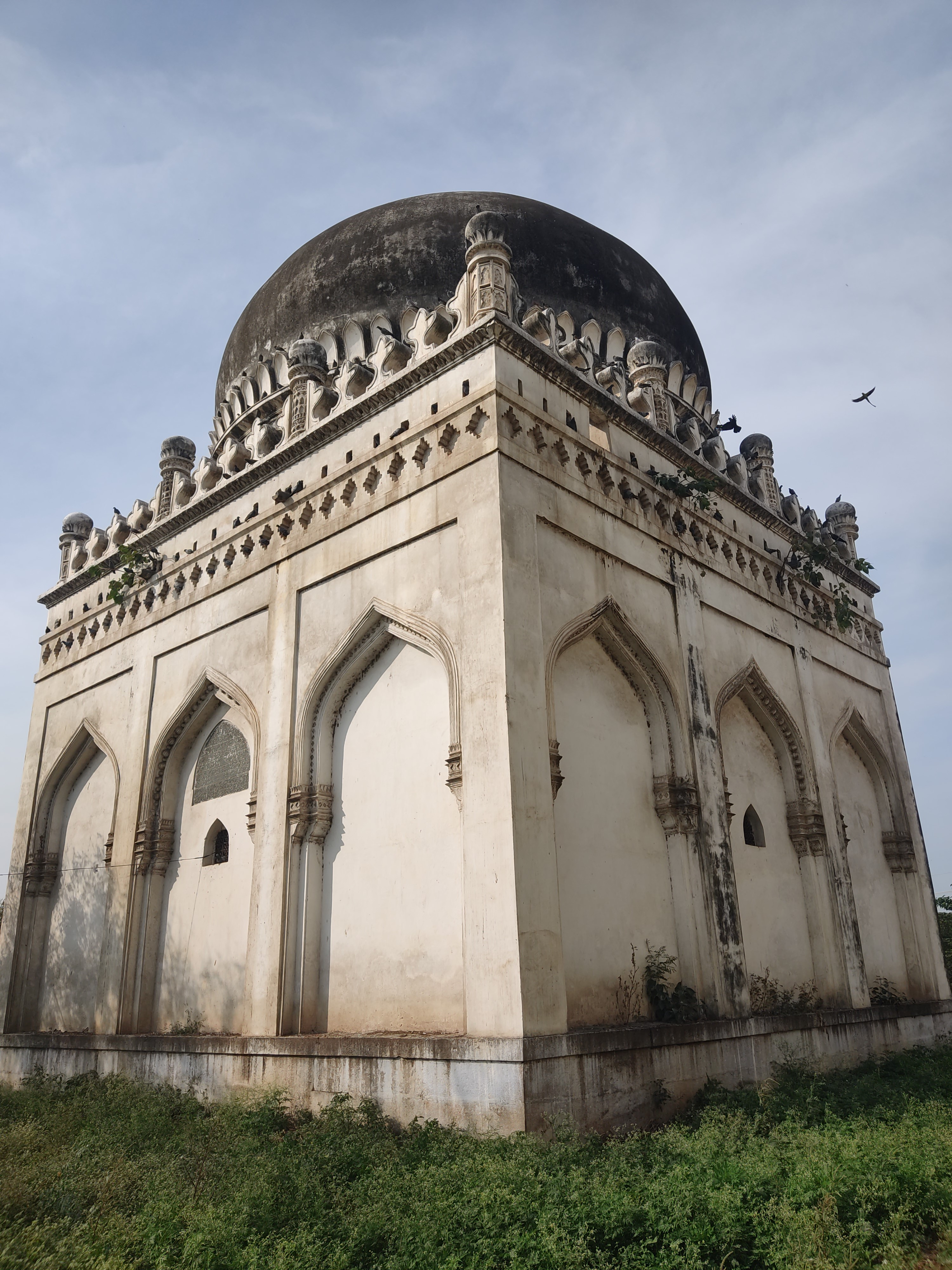
- Location: Patancheru, Hyderabad, India
- Built: 1568
- Architectural style: Qutb Shahi architecture

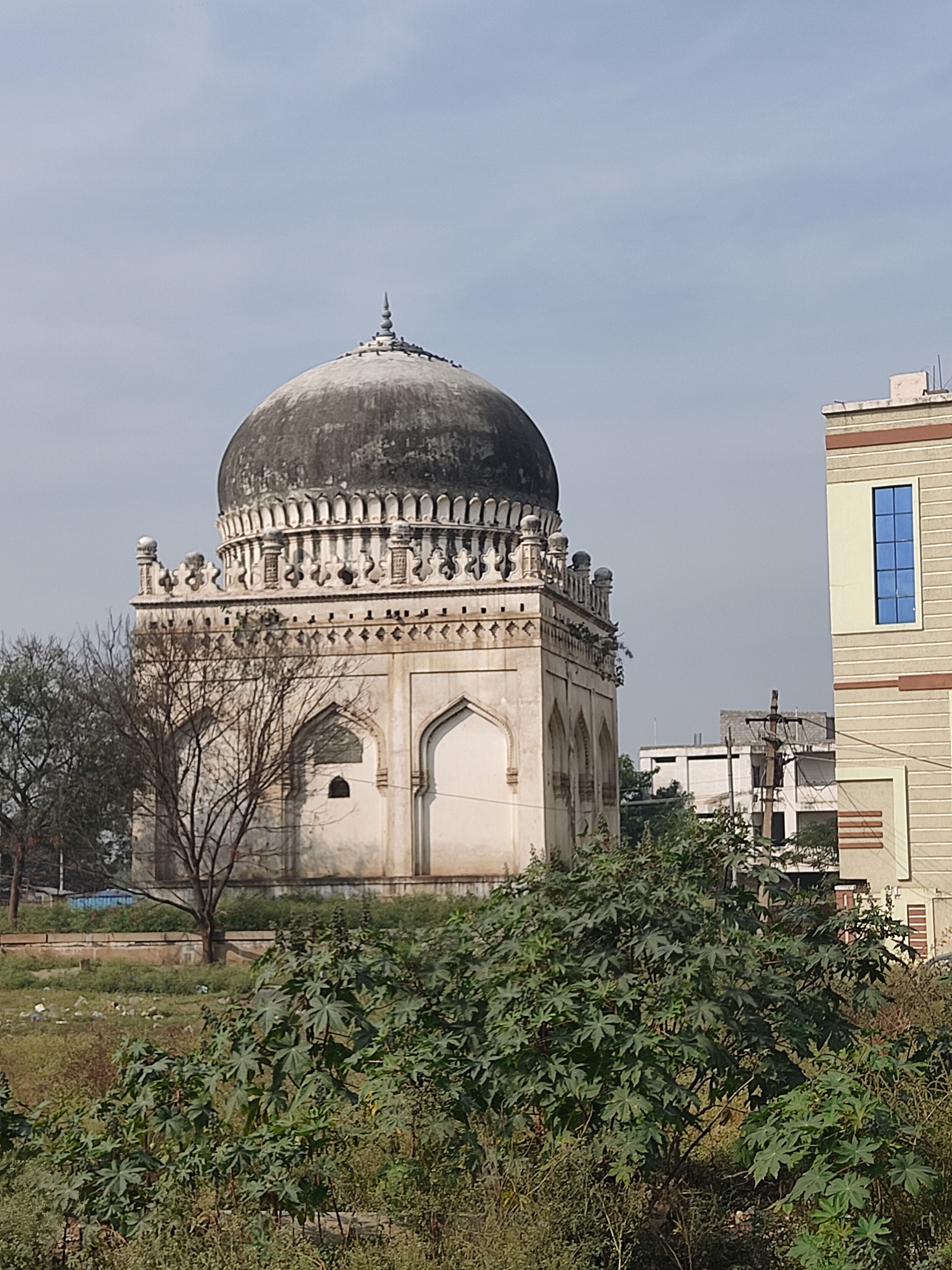
Tomb of Amin Khan

The Tomb of Amin Khan is a tomb located in Patancheru, Hyderabad. It was completed in 1568.

It is the resting place of Abd-al Qadir Amin Khan, a minister in the Golconda Sultanate under Ibrahim Qutb Shah, who also served as the chieftain of Patancheru. The tomb is surrounded by a vegetable and fruit bazaar.

== Architecture ==
The tomb is built in the traditional Qutb Shahi style, on a raised platform with an onion dome. It is embellished with stucco work.

== Inscription ==
The Persian inscription on the tomb's Eastern wall says that Amin Khan commissioned the tomb himself and dates it to 1568. It also lists the names of his father, grandfather, wives, and sons.

== See also ==
- Qutb Shahi tombs
