= Qutb Shahi architecture =

Indo-Islamic architectural style

Qutb Shahi architecture is the distinct style of Indo-Islamic architecture developed during the reign of the Qutb Shahi dynasty, also known as the Golconda Sultanate.

Qutb Shahi buildings are seen in the city of Hyderabad and its surroundings. The Golconda Fort, which predates the founding of the city is the earliest example. The style reached its zenith during the reign of Muhammad Quli Qutb Shah, who founded the city of Hyderabad and constructed the Charminar as its centerpiece.

The style is similar to that of the Bahmani Sultanate and other Deccan Sultanates, whose monuments can be seen in Gulbarga, Bijapur, and Bidar. It is heavily influenced by Persian architecture.

Several buildings in the style were put by UNESCO on its "tentative list" to become a World Heritage Site in 2014, with others in the region, under the name Monuments and Forts of the Deccan Sultanate (despite there being a number of different sultanates).

== Features ==
The Qutb Shahi buildings consist of:

- Expansive mosques and palaces built out of granite
- Inscriptions including Persian poetry and verses from the Quran
- Heavy stucco ornamental work and jali latticed screens

== Mosques ==
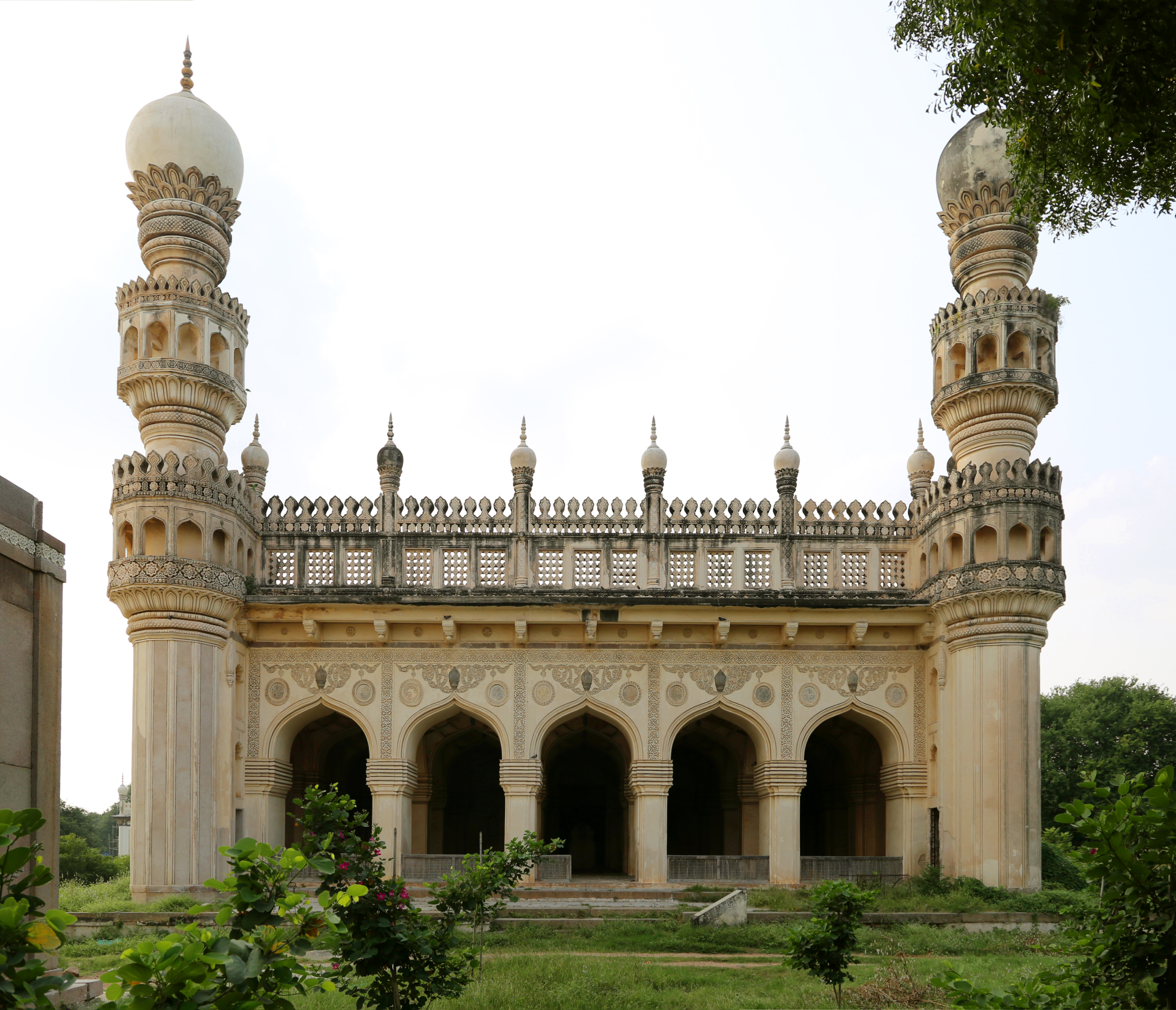
Mosque at the Qutb Shahi tombs

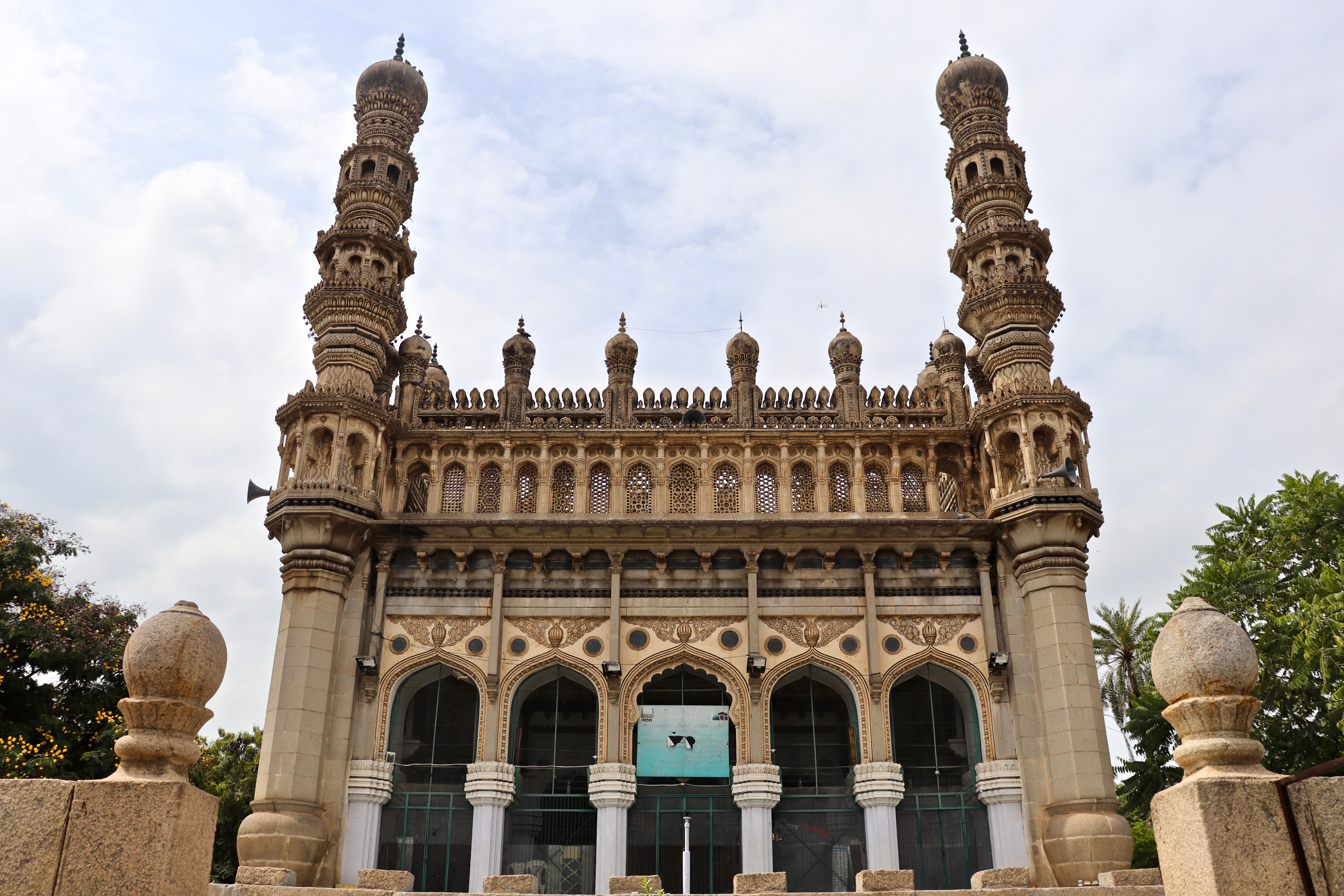
Toli Masjid

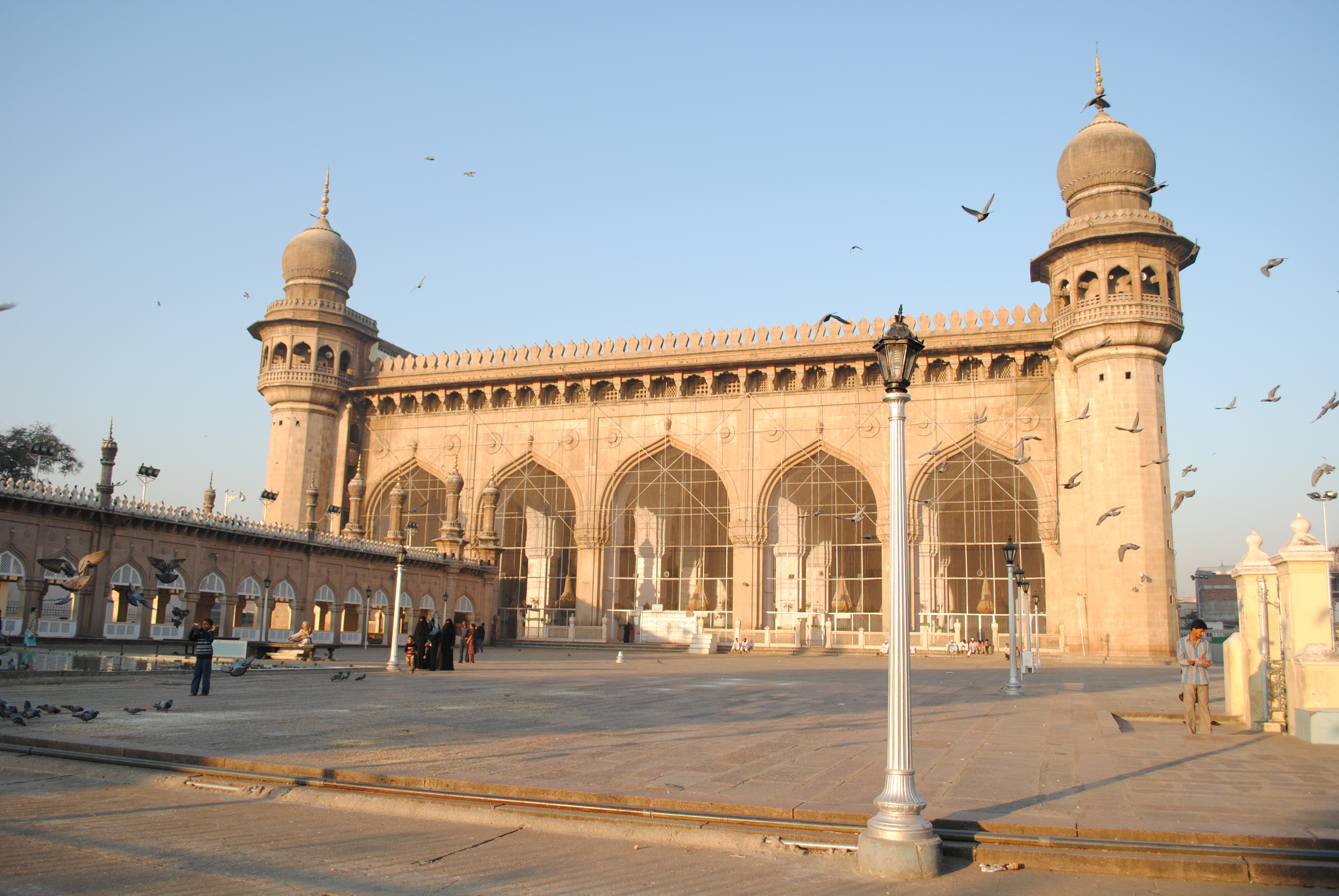
Mecca Masjid

The Qutb Shahi mosque would have five arched entranceways. The facade would be flanked with two galleried minarets. Elaborate stucco work would be used to embellish the facade

The number of arches on the facade would be either five, symbolizing the Panjtan, or three, symbolizing God, Muhammad, and Ali. The mosques would be set within caravanserais or shops nearby would be endowed to the mosque in order to ensure funding.

In some Hyderabad mosques, the entire facade has been decorated with low-relief work. The most used motifs are medallions above the arches, and a flower resting on the point of the arch.

=== Dome ===
The importance of the dome decreased in Golconda mosques, and in later mosques it is altogether eliminated. Shallow domes, which would not be visible from the outside, would be used to support the roof. The Toli Masjid represents the final phase.

=== Minarets ===
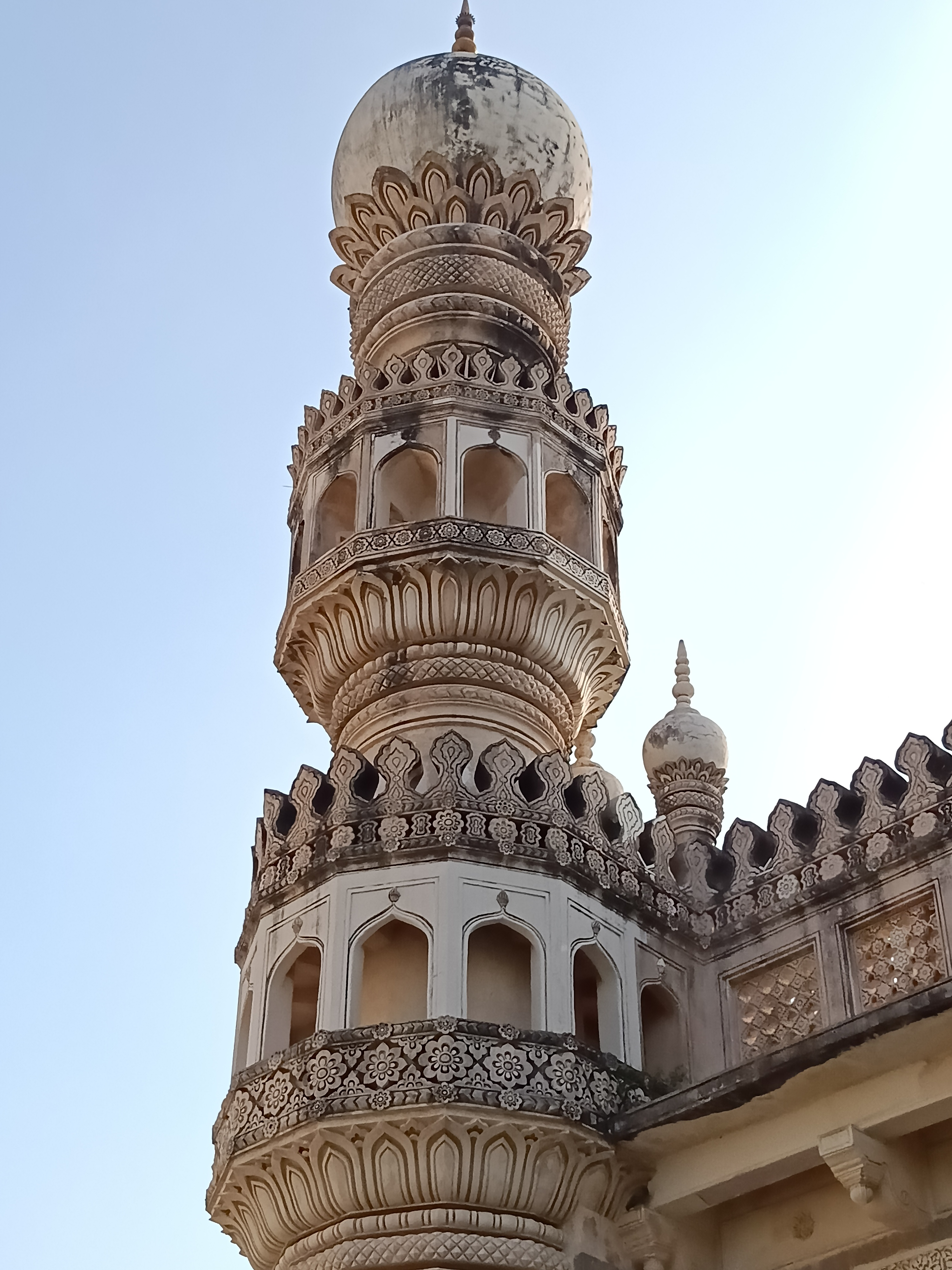
Minaret

Golconda mosques generally have two minarets, flanking the mosque facade. Two, smaller minarets are provided at the rear in some mosques. However, the rear minarets are uncommon.

They constitute the dominant feature of the mosque, as domes are reduced in importance, especially in later mosques. Instead of an open balcony, as seen in Bahmani structures, the balconies are covered and projecting outward in the form of galleries. Consequently, the minarets are heavy-looking. The towers generally taper upwards, and each upper balcony is smaller than its lower counterparts.

=== Interior ===
The use of black basalt to decorate the qibla wall is typically seen.

== Tombs ==
There is some variety in the design of the Qutb Shahi tomb. The most common type is square, highly influenced by the Bahmani and Barid Shahi tombs.

== History ==
=== Golconda Fort ===
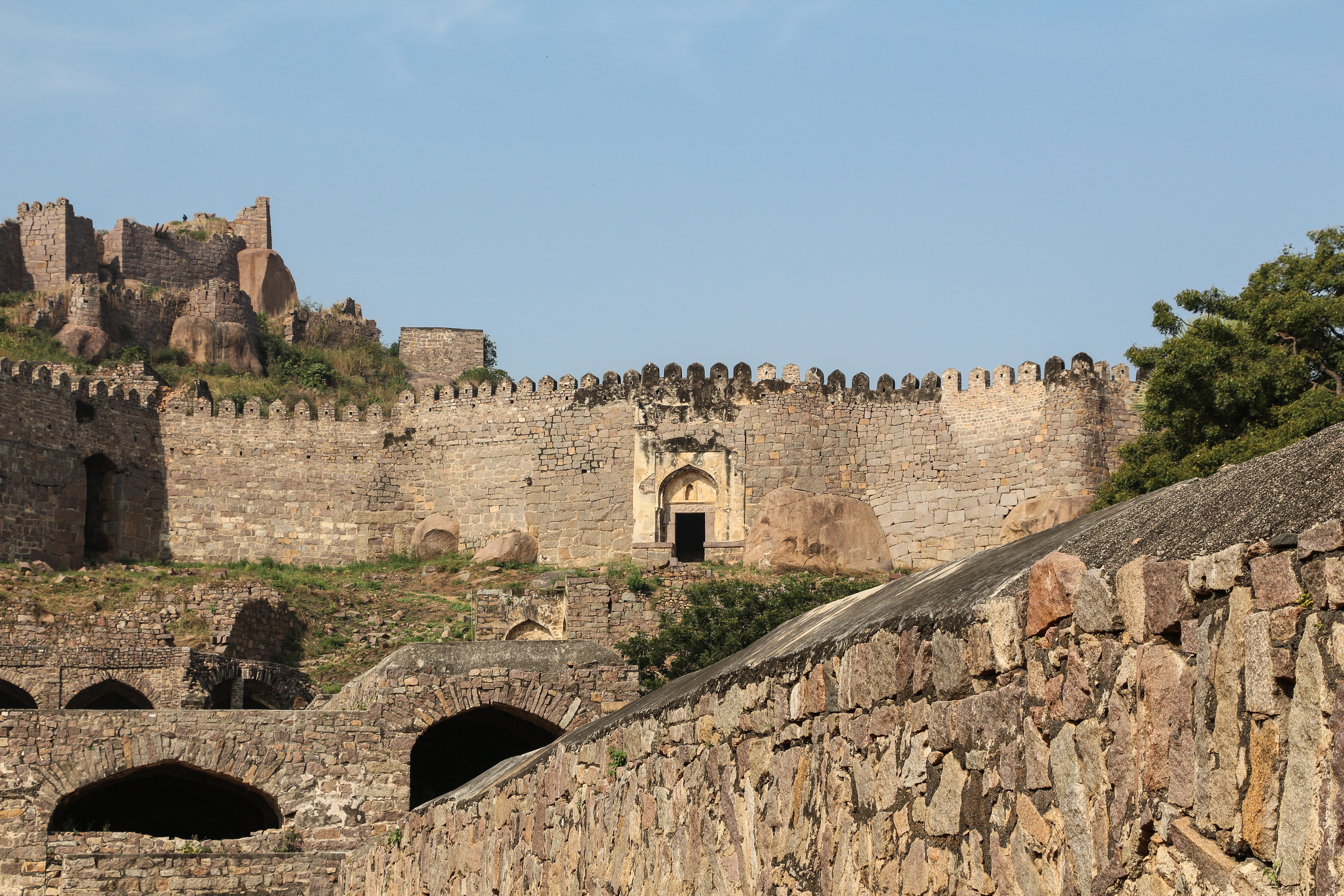
Golconda Fort

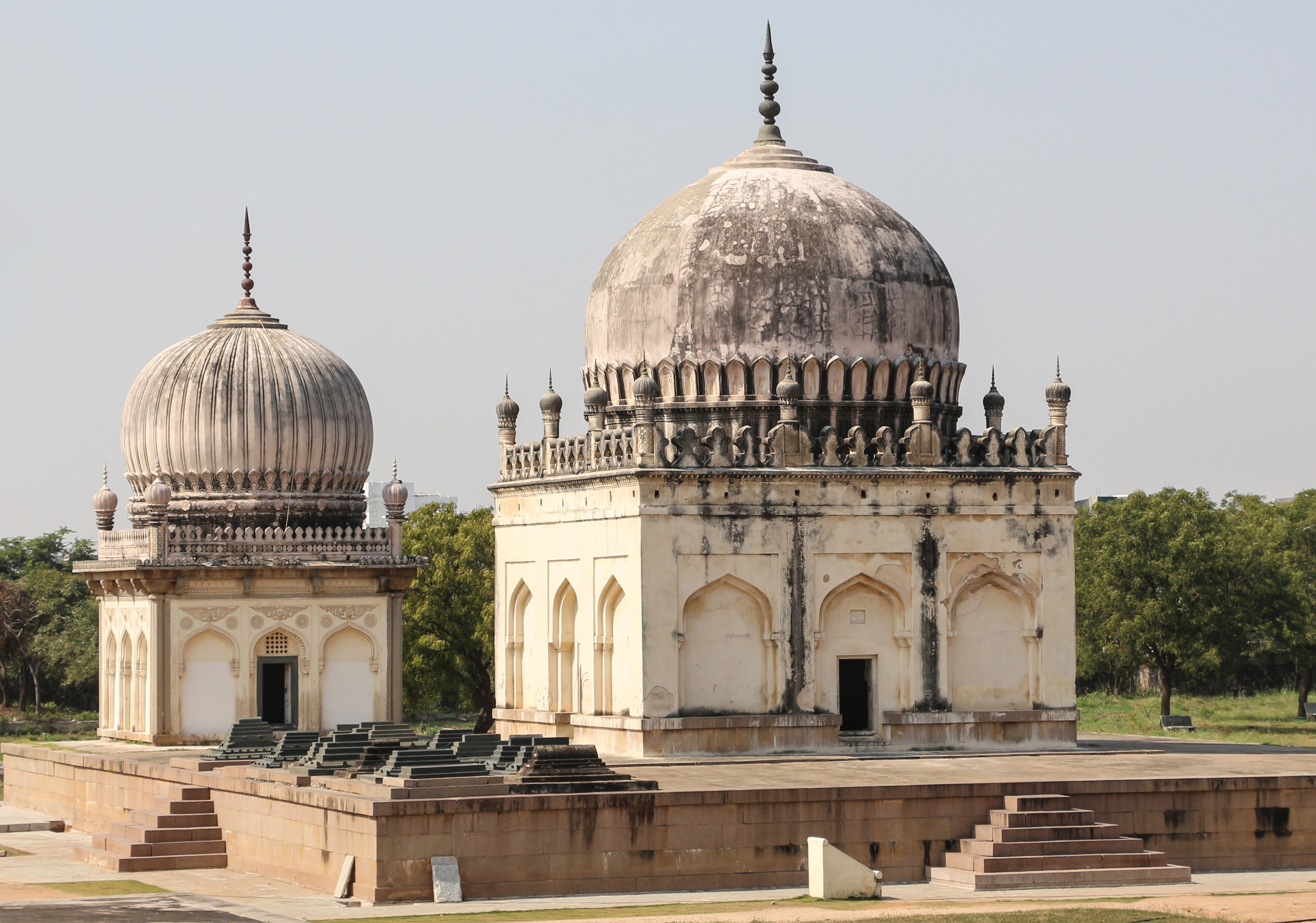
Qutb Shahi tombs

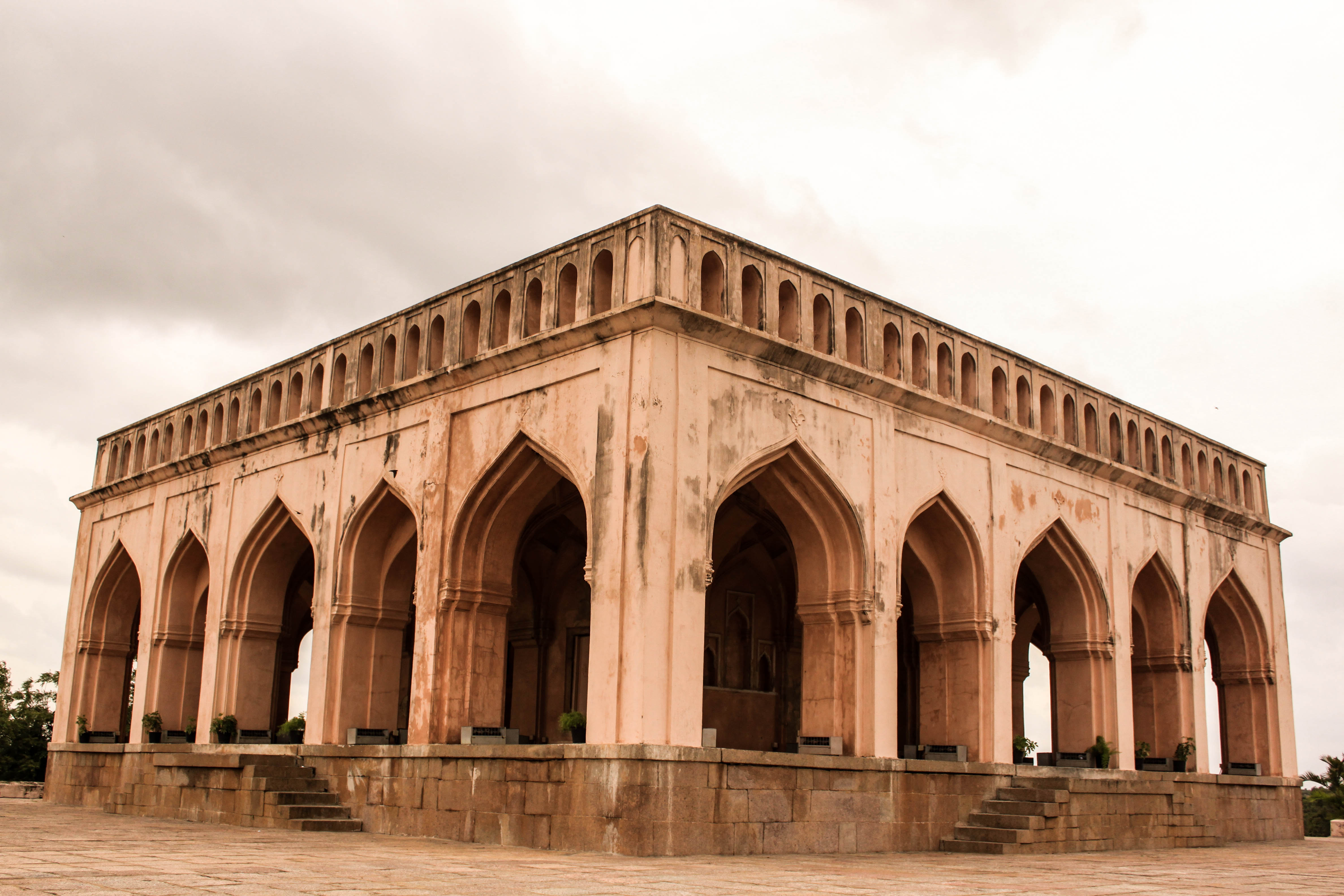
Taramati Baradari

The Golconda Fort is the earliest example of the style.

=== Later architecture ===
==== Qutb Shahi tombs ====
The Qutb Shahi tombs are the necropolis of the Qutb Shahi rulers, set in a vast garden on the outskirts of the Golconda Fort. The tombs share a common features: an onion dome atop a cube surrounded by an arcade with rich ornamental details, with small minarets featuring floral motifs.

==== Charminar ====
The Charminar is one of the most recognizable examples of Qutb Shahi architecture. It was built by Muhammad Quli Qutb Shah in 1591 as a centerpiece for the newly built capital city of Hyderabad. The Charminar is a large building, square in plan, having an arch in each of its faces and a lofty decagonal minaret at each of its angles. To the south of the Charminar is the Mecca Masjid, which is one of the largest mosques of India.

To the north of the Charminar is the Gulzar Houz fountain, which is surrounded by four arches called the Char Kaman. The arches are simple and do not have many embellishments. There used to be other Qutb Shahi palaces, as well as a rose garden in the vicinity, but they were probably destroyed during the Siege of Golconda.

==== Other monuments ====
Another early structure was the Purana Pul, built in 1578 across the Musi River. The Tomb of Abdul Qadir Amin Khan at Patancheru is also from this period.

The Qutb Shahi rulers built elaborate caravanserais, or resthouses, including the Shaikpet Sarai and Taramati Baradari. The former had had 30 rooms, stables for horses and camels, a mosque and a tomb of an unknown sufi saint.

Other mosques built during this time include the Khairtabad Mosque, Hayat Bakshi Mosque, Musheerabad Masjid, and Kulsum Begum Mosque.

The Qutb Shahi rulers also made considerable additions to the Gandikota Fort.

== Revival ==
Later structures built by the Asaf Jahi rulers, such as the Afzal Gunj Masjid, were built in a revival Qutb Shahi style.

== Gallery ==
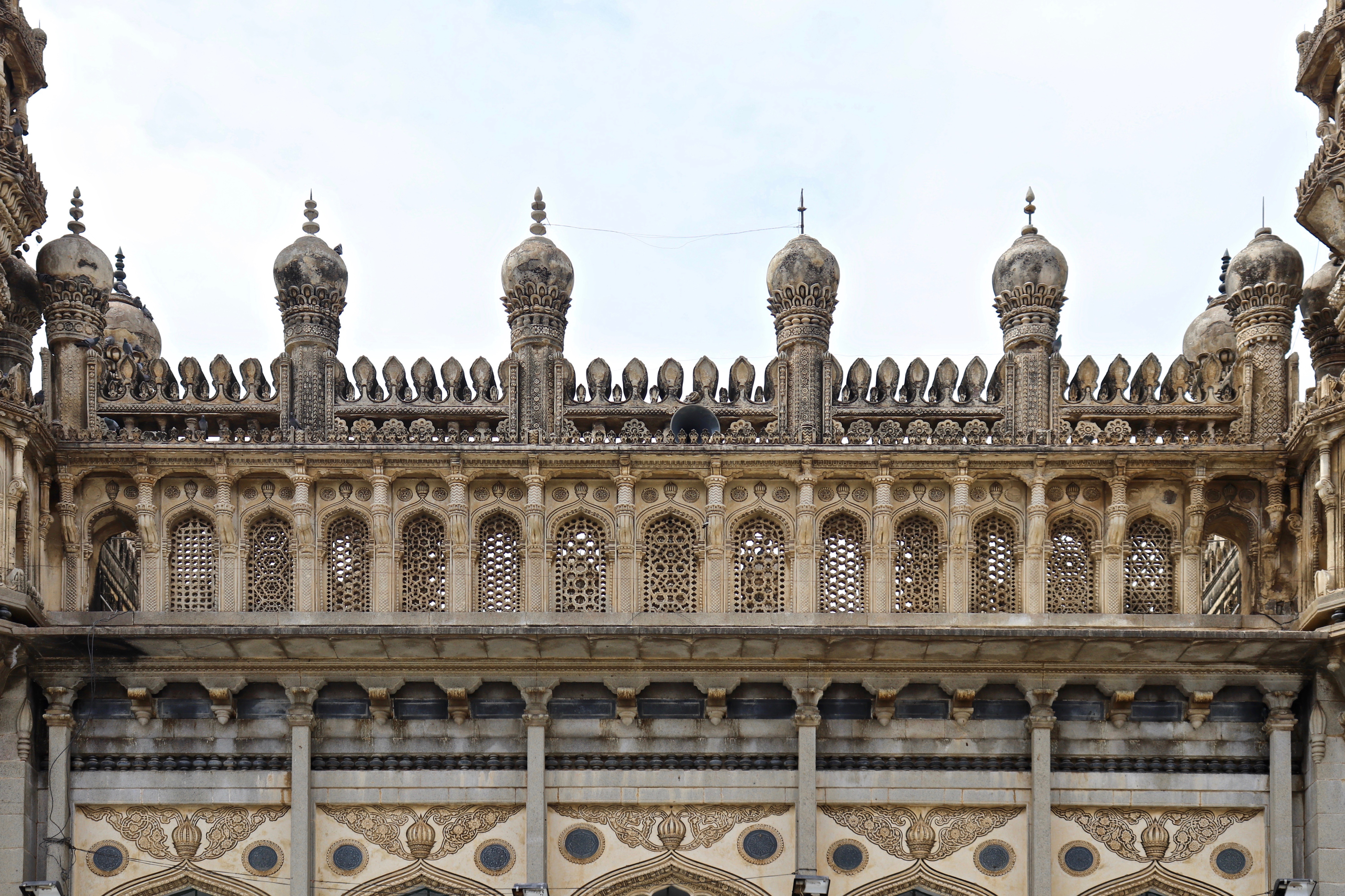
Stucco work on the facade of the Toli Masjid

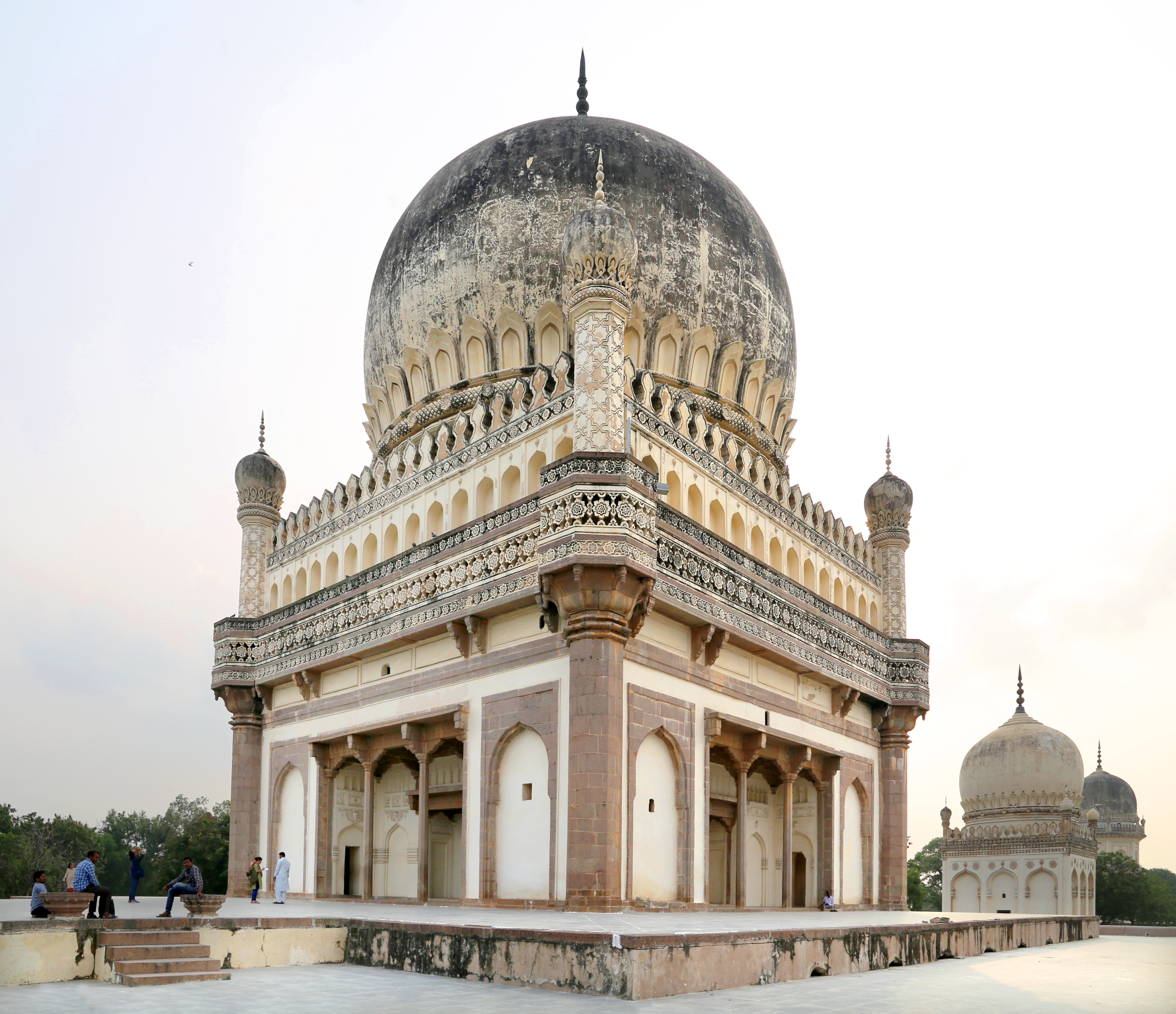
Tomb of Muhammad Quli Qutb Shah

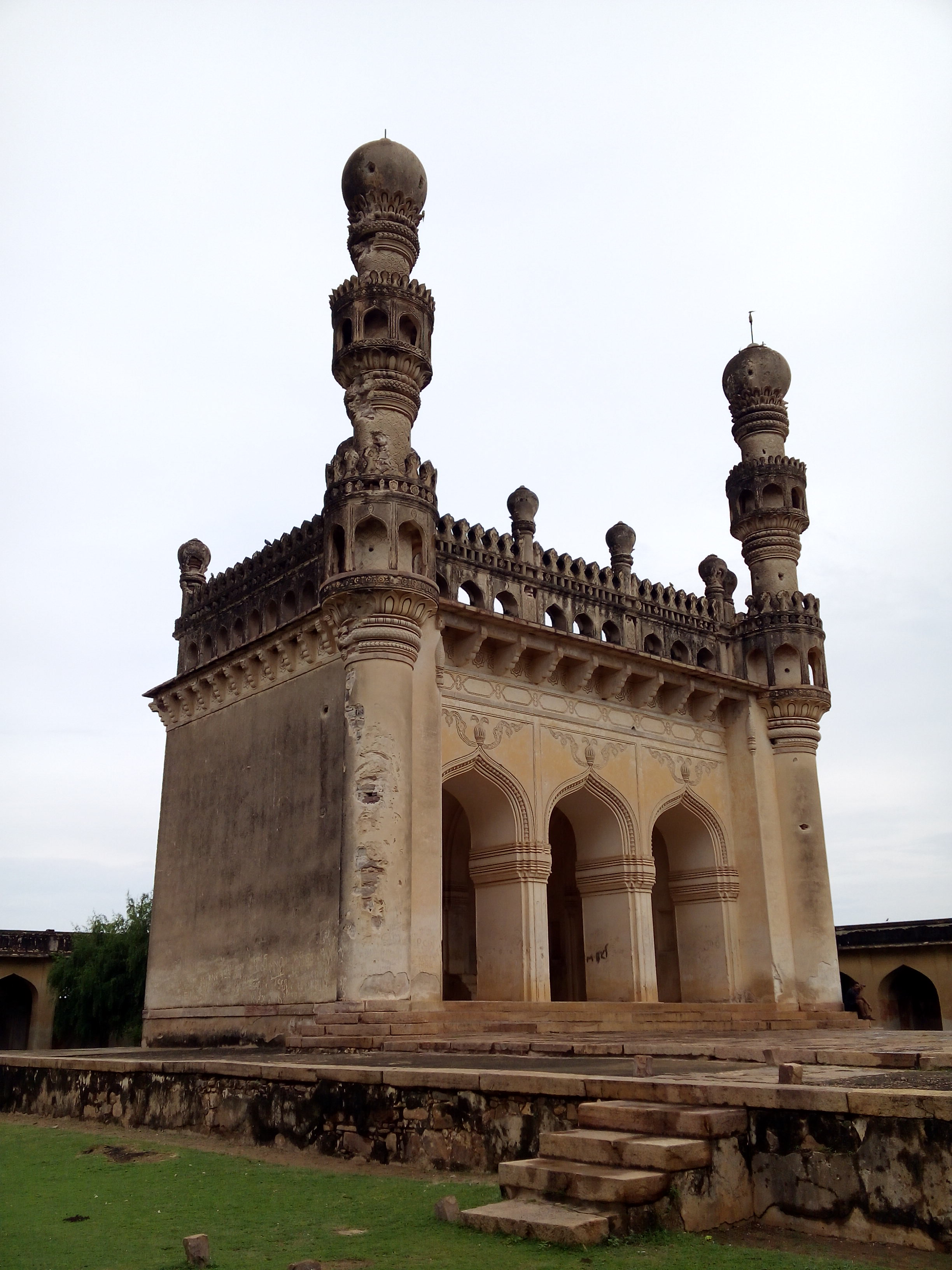
Mosque at the Gandikota Fort
