= Kulsum Begum Masjid =

Mosque in Hyderabad, Telangana, India

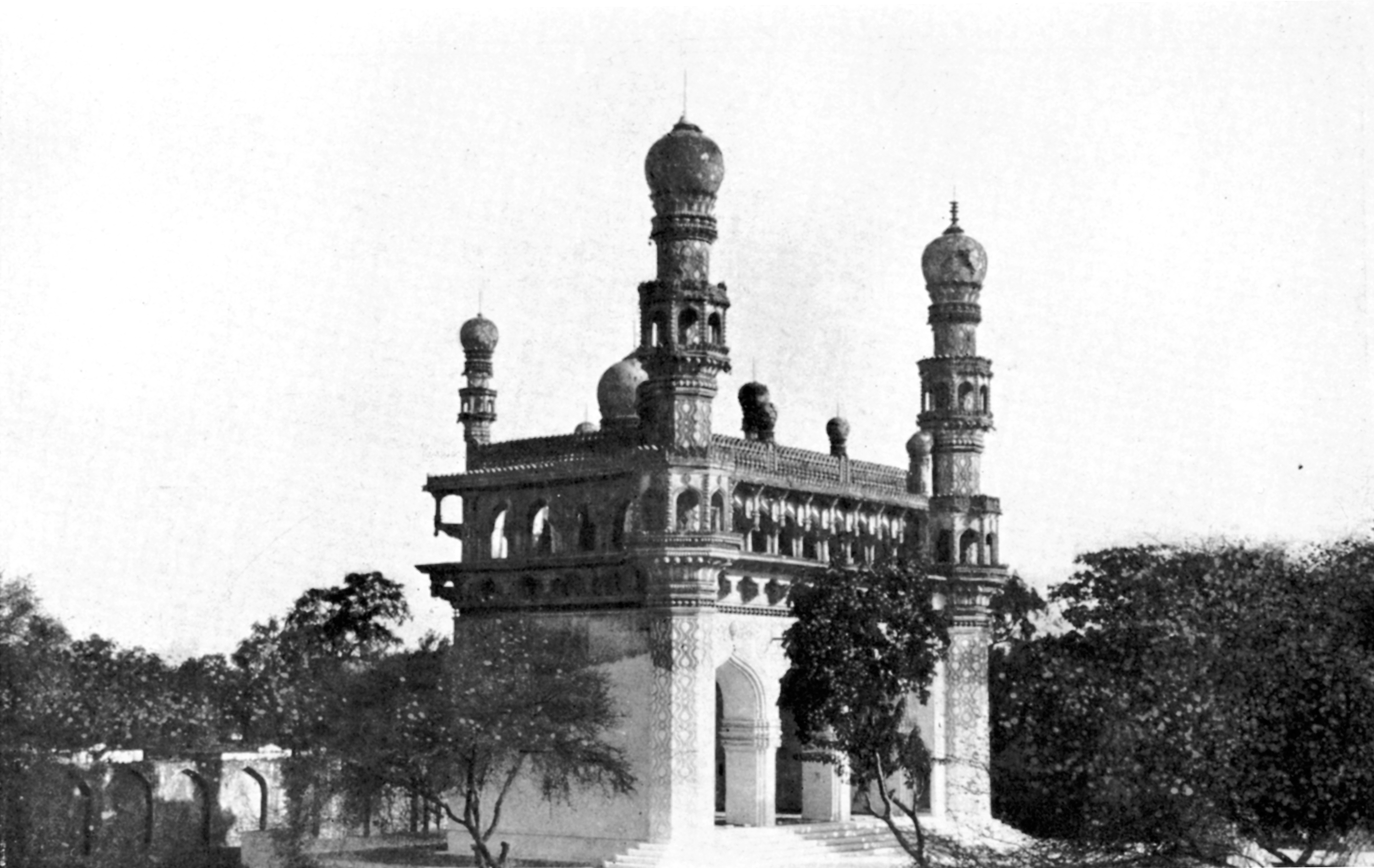
- The mosque in c. 1940s, photographed by Ghulam Yazdani

- Location of the mosque in Hyderabad

Religion
- Affiliation: Islam
- Ecclesiastical or organizational status: Mosque
- Status: Active

Location
- Location: Hyderabad, Hyderabad District, Telangana
- Country: India
- Interactive map of Kulsum Begum Masjid
- Coordinates: 17°22′31″N 78°26′36″E

Architecture
- Type: Mosque architecture
- Style: Qutb Shahi
- Founder: Kulsum Begum
- Completed: 17th century

Specifications
- Minaret: Two (maybe more)
- Materials: Granite, lime and mortar

The Kulsum Begum Masjid, also known as the Kulsumpura Masjid and as the Jama Masjid Karwan, is a mosque located in the Karwan locality of Hyderabad, in the Hyderabad district of the state of Telangana, India. It was built in the 17th century by Kulsum Begum, daughter of Sultan Muhammad Qutb Shah.

== Architecture ==
The architecture is very similar to other Qutb Shahi mosques in the city. Built on a 0.91-metre-high (3 ft) plinth, the façade of the mosque has three arched openings. The two minarets flanking the façade are heavily decorated in stucco. In addition, two small arched pavilions punctuate the parapet wall.

There is no inscription that exactly dates the construction of the mosque.

== See also ==
- Islam in India
- List of mosques in Telangana
