= Taramati Baradari =

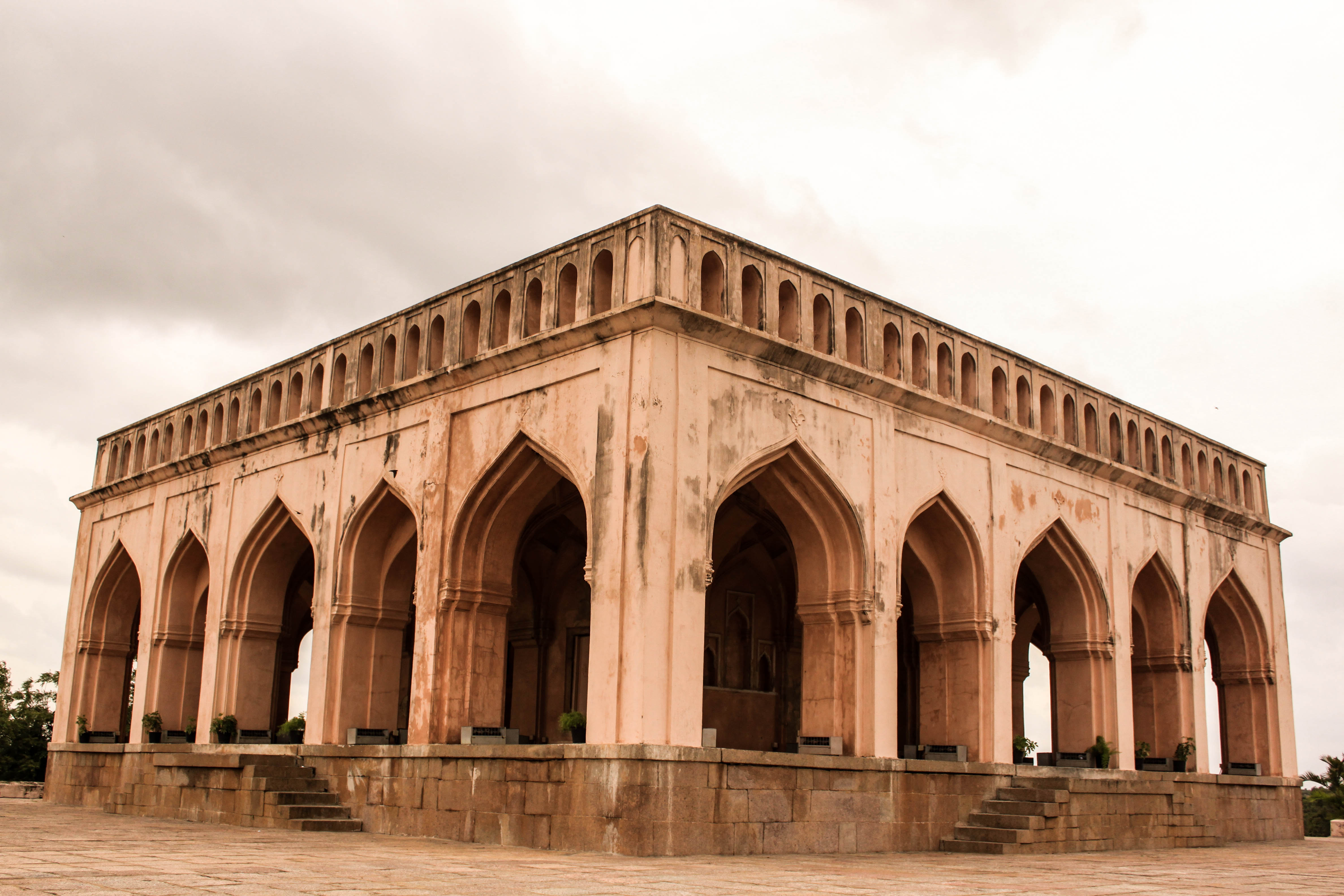

General information
- Type: Caravan Station
- Location: Hyderabad, Telangana, India
- Coordinates: 17.376080°N 78.378117°E
- Completed: 1880s

Taramati Baradari is a historical sarai as part of Ibrahim Bagh, a Persian style garden built during the reign of Ibrahim Quli Qutub Shah, the fourth Sultan of Golconda.

== History ==
The Baradari was constructed on the banks of the Musi river. Today, the region comes under the city limits of Hyderabad, India. The tourism department attributes the name to the reign of the Seventh Sultan of Golconda, Abdullah Qutb Shah who he named is after his favorite courtesan, Taramati a Nautch or Court dancer.

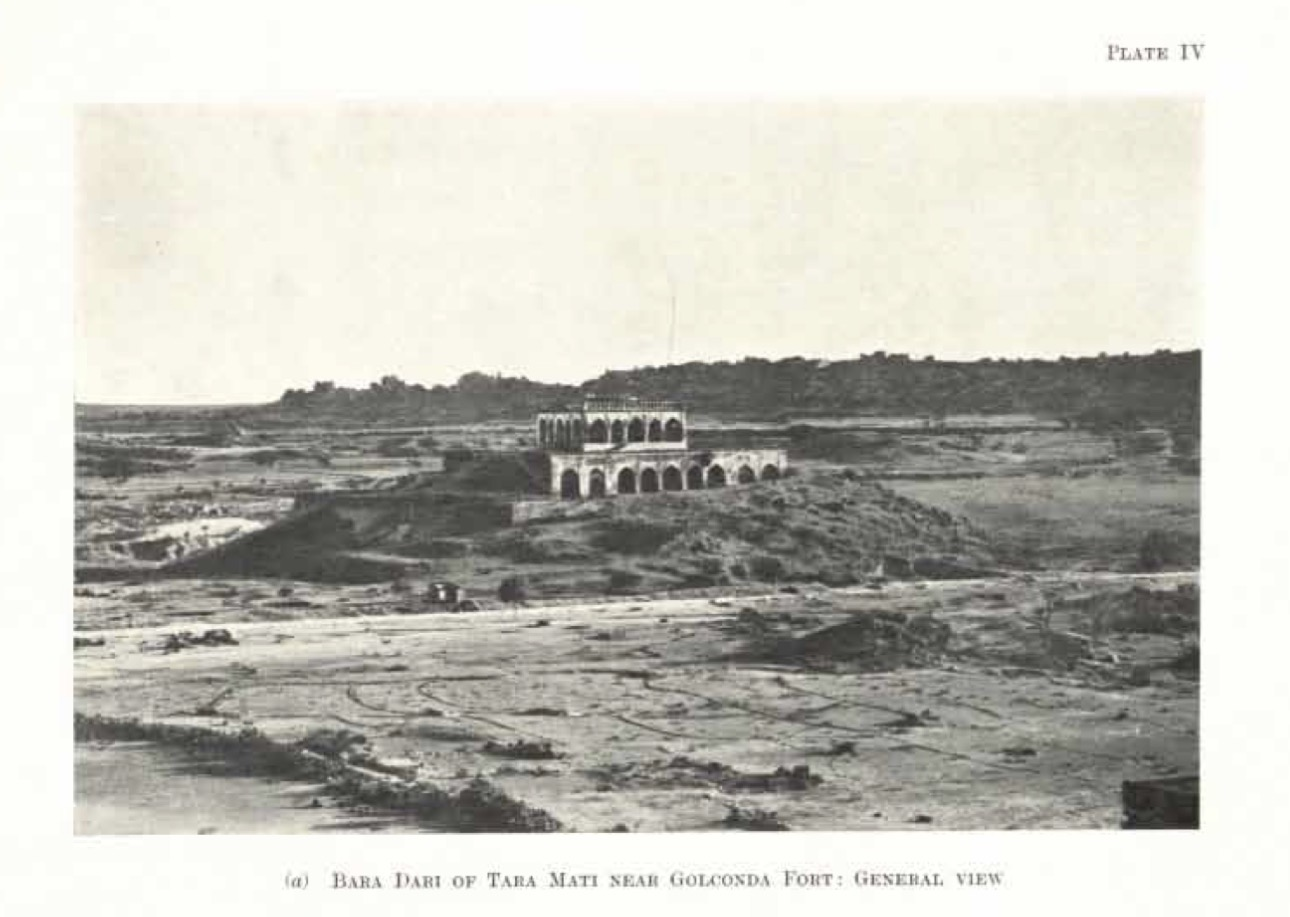
Hilltop view of Taramati Baradari from the historic Premamati Mosque nearby, photographed in 1924

== Fables ==
The tourism department promotes the location by romantic stories linking the then-Sultan with a courtesan named Taramati. One such story goes that during the reign of Abdullah Qutb Shah, he used to hear Taramati's voice as she sang for travelers at the Serai, while he sat two kilometers away at Golconda fort. Her voice was carried by wind, and the prince would listen from the fort. There is no recorded report of the same.

Another fable tells of two ravishing dancing sisters, Taramati and Premamati, who danced on ropes tied between their pavilion and the balcony of the king and patron, Abdulla Qutub Shah.

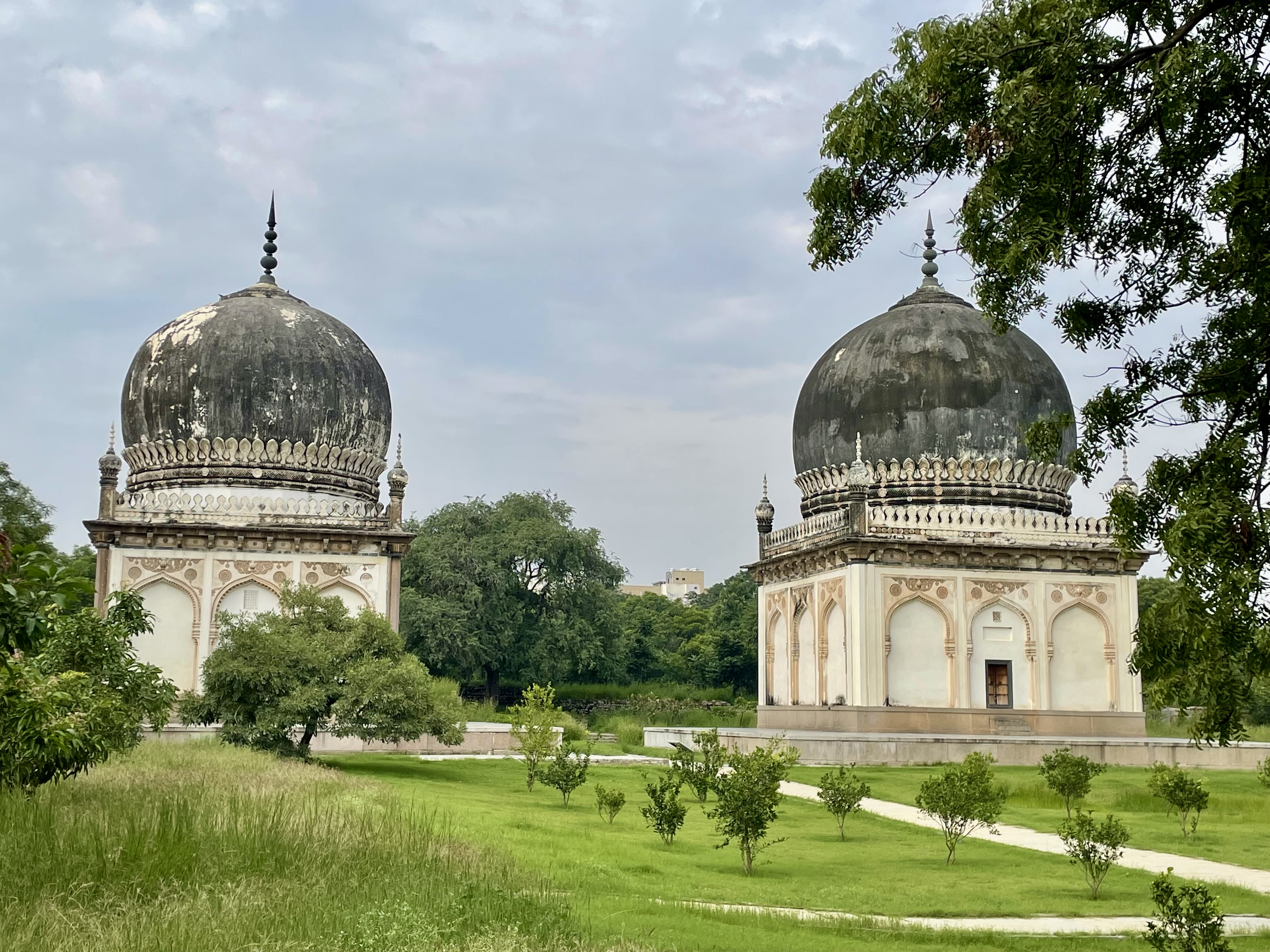
Tombs of Taramati (left) and Premamati (right) at the Qutb Shahi Tombs complex

About half a mile north of the fort lies his grave amid a cluster of carved royal tombs. Here lie buried the Qutub Shahi kings and queens in what once their rose gardens.

As a tribute to Taramati and Premamati, they both were buried in the royal cemetery of the Qutub Shahi kings.

== Renovation ==
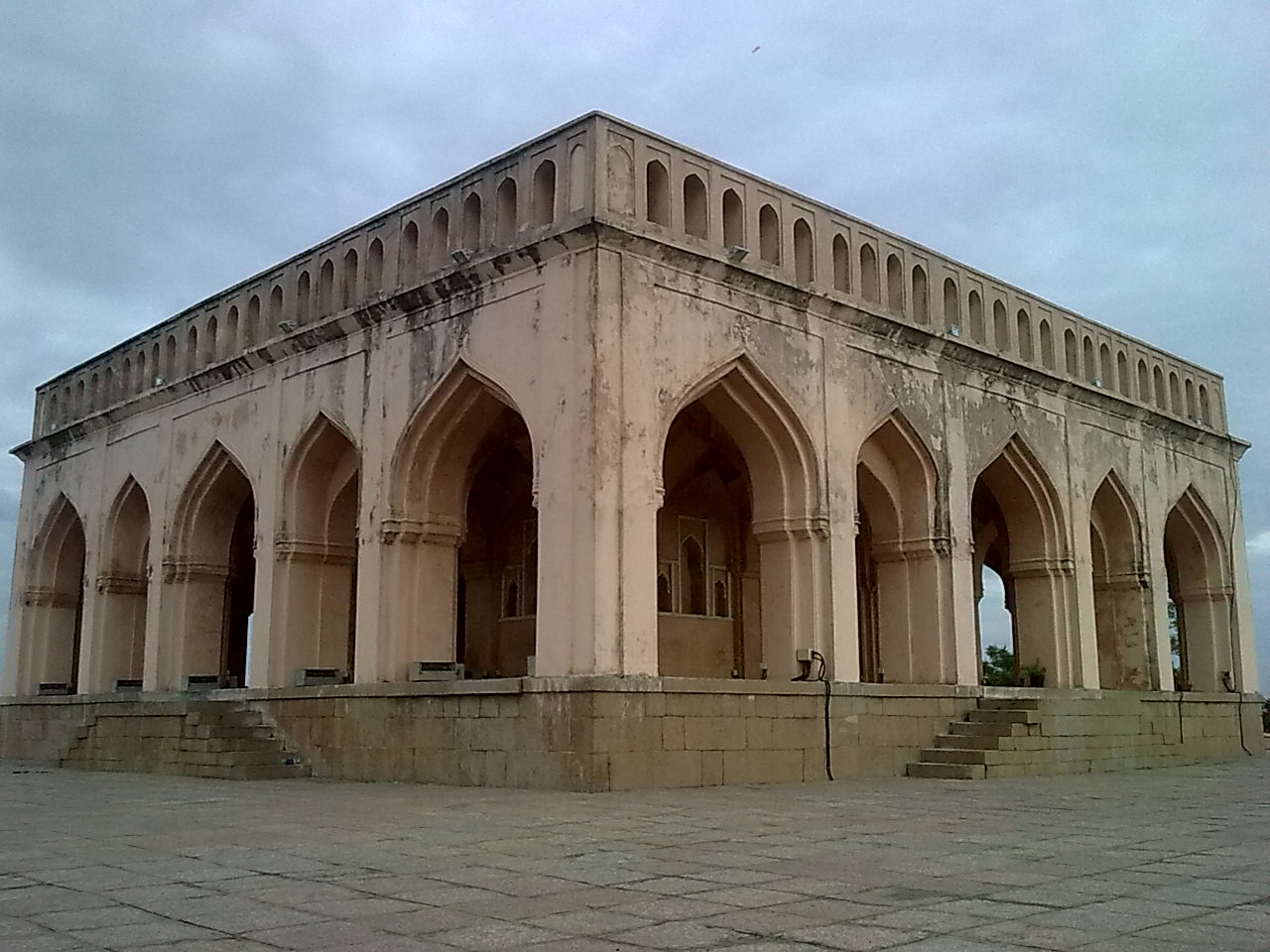
Taramati Baradari

Taramati Baradari pavilion has 12 doorways and was constructed to allow cross ventilation and is one of the most indigenous techniques to have been used at that time.

The open pavilion includes other facilities like an air-cooled theatre with the capacity of 500 people, an open-air auditorium with the capacity of 1600 people, Banquet Hall with a capacity of 250, multi-cuisine restaurant and a swimming pool.

== See also ==
- Charminar
- Golconda
- Chowmahalla Palace
- Naya Qila
