= Kalsoom =

Kalsoom (Urdu: كلثوم) is a Pakistani feminine given name. Notable people with the surname include:

- Kalsoom Nawaz Sharif (1950–2018), First Lady of Pakistan
- Kalsoom Perveen (1945–2020), Pakistani politician
