= Ümmügülsüm Sultan =

Ümmügülsüm Sultan may refer to:

- Ümmügülsüm Sultan, an Ottoman princess, the daughter of Sultan Mehmed III
- Ümmühan Sultan (daughter of Ahmed I), Ottoman princess, daughter of Ahmed I
- Ümmügülsüm Sultan (daughter of Ibrahim) (1643–1655), Ottoman princess, daughter of Sultan Ibrahim
- Ümmügülsüm Sultan (daughter of Mehmed IV) (c. 1677 – 1720), Ottoman princess
- Ümmügülsüm Sultan (daughter of Ahmed III) (1708–1732), Ottoman princess
