= Umm Kulthum (name) =

Umm Kulthum (Arabic: أم كلثوم), sometimes Umme Kulsum (Bengali: উম্মে কুলসুম), is a female given name that means "Mother of Kulthum". Several people of this name, originally a kunya (i.e. an honorific teknonym), were connected directly to the Islamic prophet Muhammad. It has also been used in modern times.

== Notable people ==
- Umm Kulthum bint Muhammad (c. 603–630), one of the daughters of Muhammad
- Umm Kulthum bint Ali (before 632 – after 680), a daughter of Ali and granddaughter of Muhammad
- Umm Kulthum bint Uqba (c. 610–654), a daughter of Uqba ibn Abi Mu'ayt, a companion of Muhammad and commentator on the Qur'an
- Umm Kulthum bint Abi Bakr (c. 634 – after 660), a daughter of Abu Bakr, a companion of Muhammad and the first caliph
- Umm Kulthum bint Jarwal (before 616 – after 630), a wife of Umar, a companion of Muhammad
- Umm Kulthum (1898–1975), Egyptian singer
- Umme Kulsum Smrity (born 1963), Bangladeshi politician

== See also ==
- Umm Kulthum Museum, a biographical museum in Cairo dedicated to singer Umm Kulthum
- Umm-e-Kulsoom, a Pakistani television series
- Kulthum
- Arabic name
