= Gülsüm Güleçyüz =

Turkish women's handballer (born 1993)

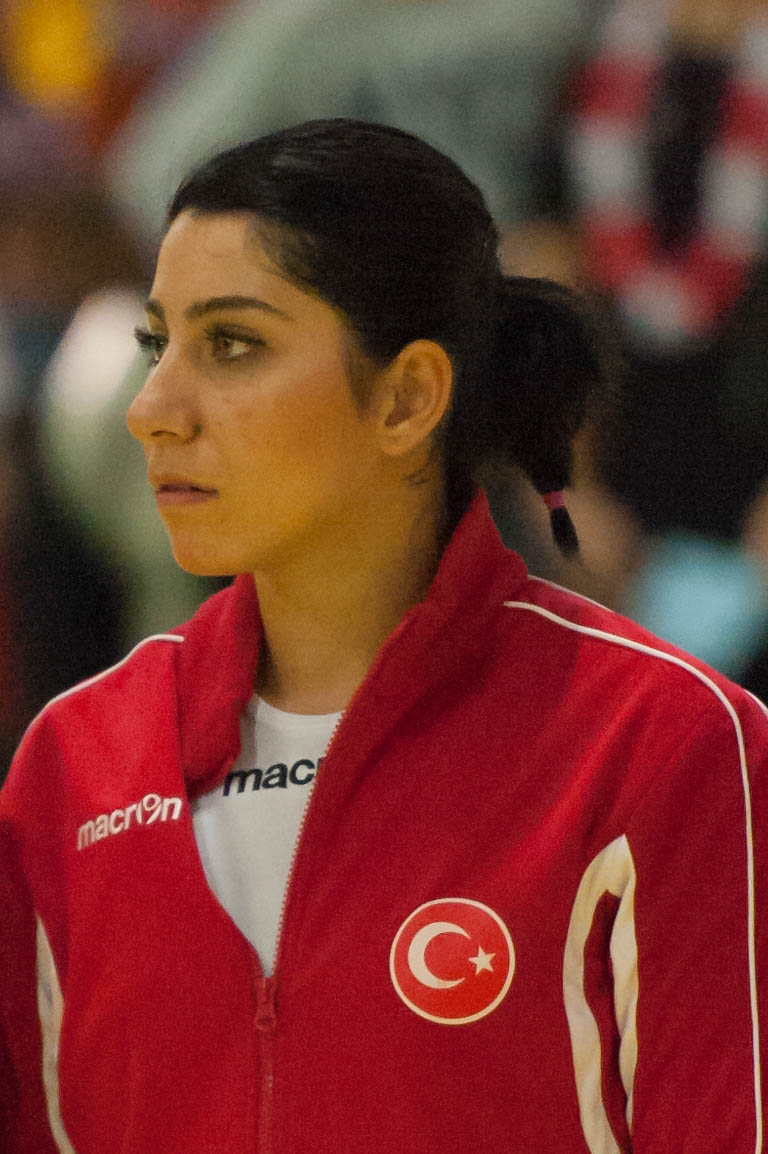
- Gülsüm Güleçyüz at the 2015 World Women's Handball Championship qualification.

Personal information
- Born: November 16, 1993 (age 32) Çorum, Turkey
- Height: 167 cm (66 in)

Sport
- Sport: Handball
- Position: Right Back
- Current club: Muratpaşa Bld. SK
- Number: 53
National team
- Years: Team
- –: Turkey

Gülsüm Güleçyüz (born November 16, 1993) is a Turkish women's handballer, who plays in the Turkish Women's Handball Super League for Muratpaşa Bld. SK, and the Turkey national team. She plays in the right back position.

== Playing career ==
=== Club ===
Gülsüm Güleçyüz plays right back for Muratpaşa Bld. SK, which competes in the Turkish Women's Handball Super League.

Her team became league champion for two consecutive seasons in 2012–13, 2013–14. In the 2014–15 season, her team lost the champion title in the play-offs.

Güleçyüz played in the Women's EHF Cup Winners' Cup matches of the 2013–14 season, in the Women's EHF Champions League of 2013–14 as well as in the Women's EHF Cup games (2014–15 and 2015–16).

In June 2015, she renewed her contract with Muratpaşa Bld. Sk for one year.

=== International ===
Gülsüm Güleçyüz is part of the Turkey women's national handball team. She played in the 2015 World Women's Handball Championship – European qualification, and 2016 European Women's Handball Championship qualification matches.

== Honours ==
Turkish Women's Handball Super League

- Winners (2): 2012–13, 2013–14.
- Runner-up (1): 2014–15.
