= Gülsüm Kav =

Turkish women's rights activist

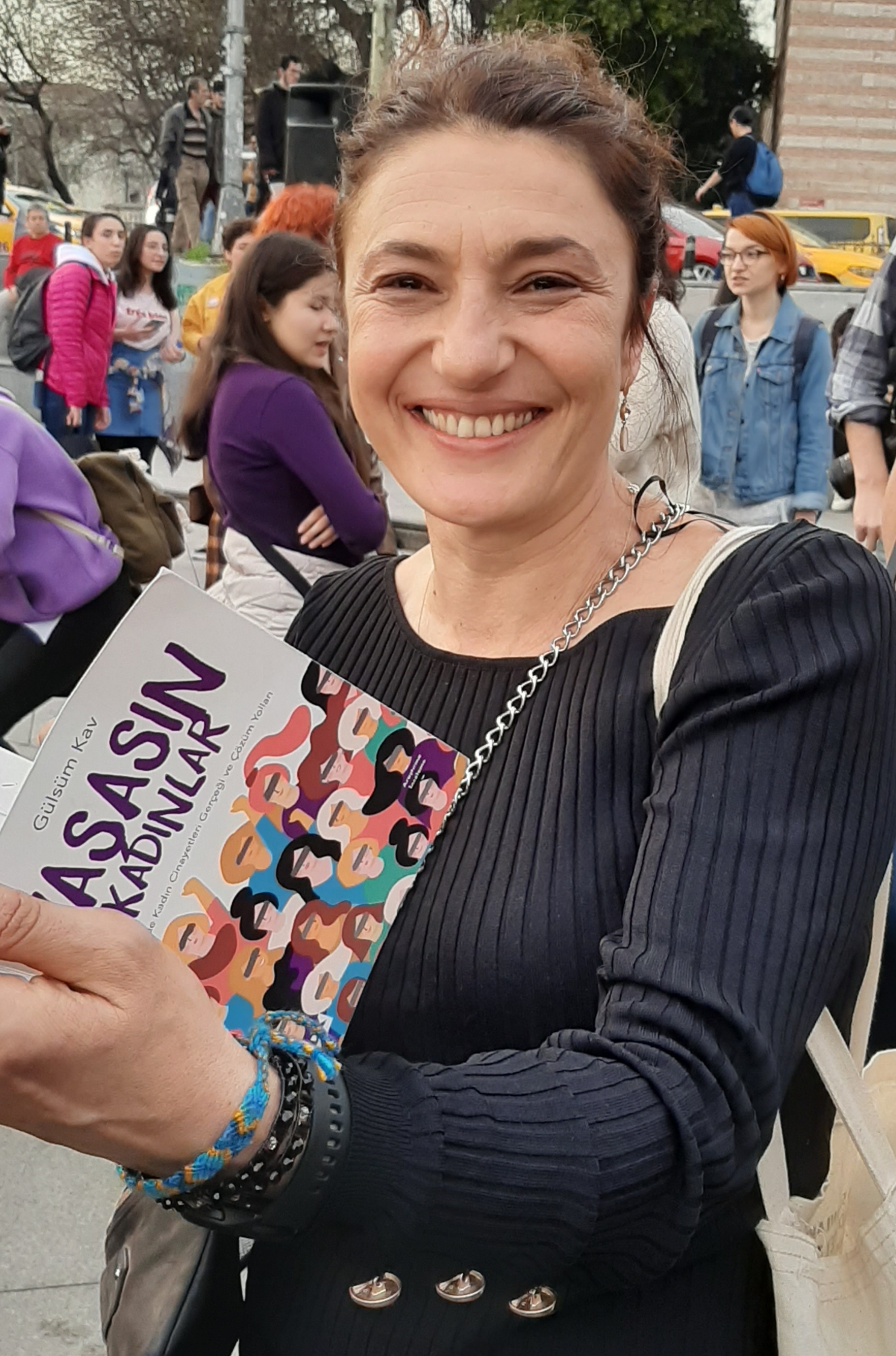
- Gülsüm Kav in March 2020
- Born: 1971 (age 54–55); Eskişehir, Turkey
- Citizenship: Turkey
- Education: Eskişehir Anadolu University
- Occupations: Doctor; Activist; Writer
- Known for: BBC 100 Women 2020

Gülsüm Kav (born 1971) is a Turkish feminist activist, writer and doctor. She is one of the founders of the organisation We Will Stop Femicide Platform, who raise awareness of gender-based violence in Turkey and campaign on behalf of the families of victims of femicide.

== Biography ==
Kav was born in 1971. She graduated from Eskişehir Anadolu University Faculty of Medicine in 1996 and in 2002 she was appointed a specialist at Istanbul University Cerrahpaşa Medical Faculty Deontology Department. She started her career as a medical ethics specialist and continued with the Istanbul Regional Directorate Patient Rights Specialist. Since 2012, she has continued to work as a specialist at Şişli Etfal Training and Research Hospital.

Kav has also worked in the Human Rights Commission in Ankara and in a variety of medical settings, including: the Forum of the Istanbul Medical Chamber, the Physician Forum, the Gynaecology Committee, the Ethics Committee and the Istanbul Representation of the TTB Women's Medicine Branch.

== Activism ==
Kav, a feminist activist, is the general representative of We Will Stop Femicide Platform. In 2014 she was elected to the Executive Board of the United June Movement. Kav has appeared in multiple media outlets discussing the problem of violence against women in Turkey. She is a writer and columnist, who has been published by organisations such as: Yarın Haber; Yeni Yaşam.

== Awards ==
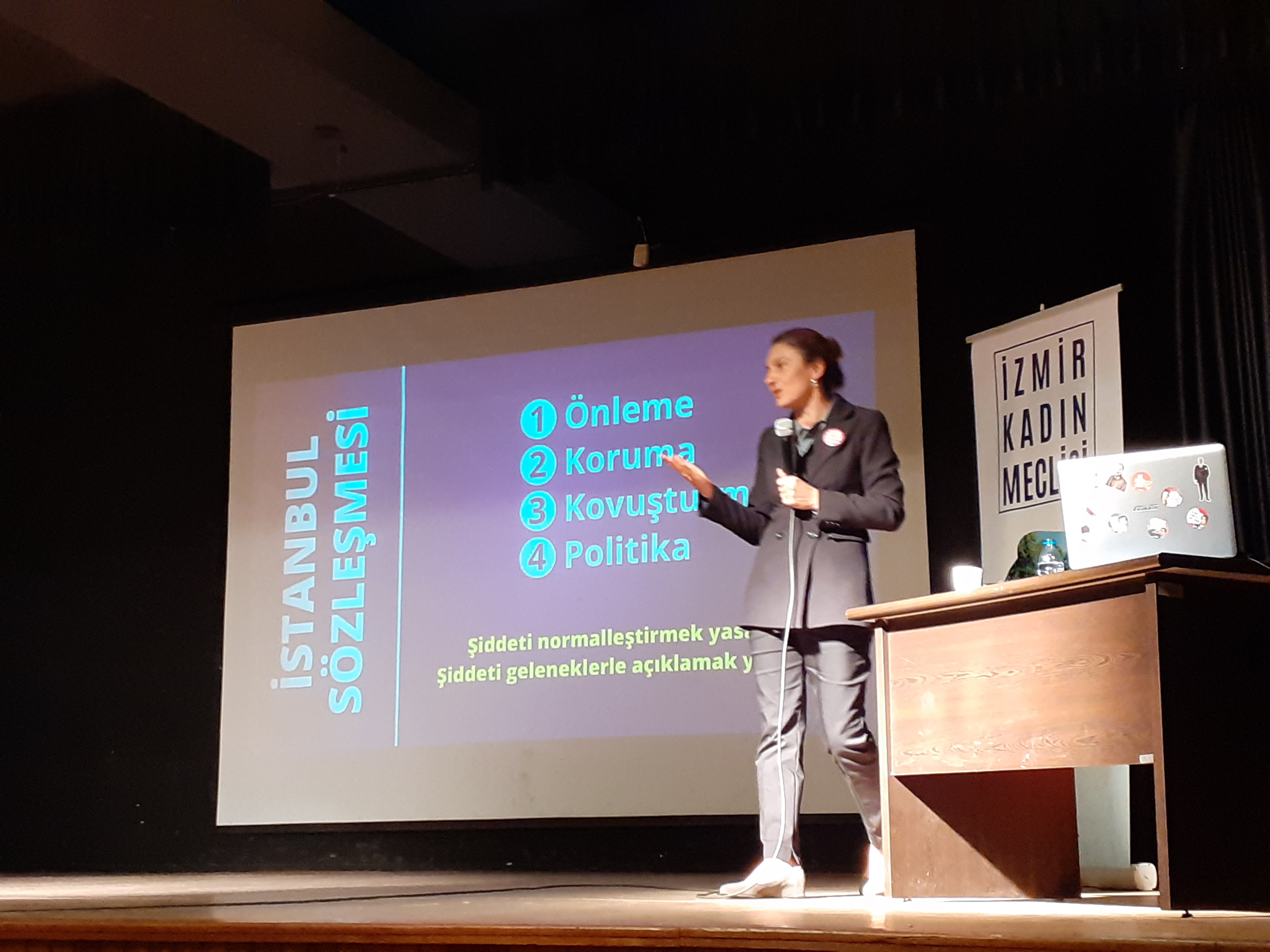
Gülsüm Kav speaking about Istanbul Convention in Izmir.

In 2020 Kav was included in the BBC's annual 100 Women List.
