= ECIL X Roads =

Road in Telangana, India

- Neighbourhood
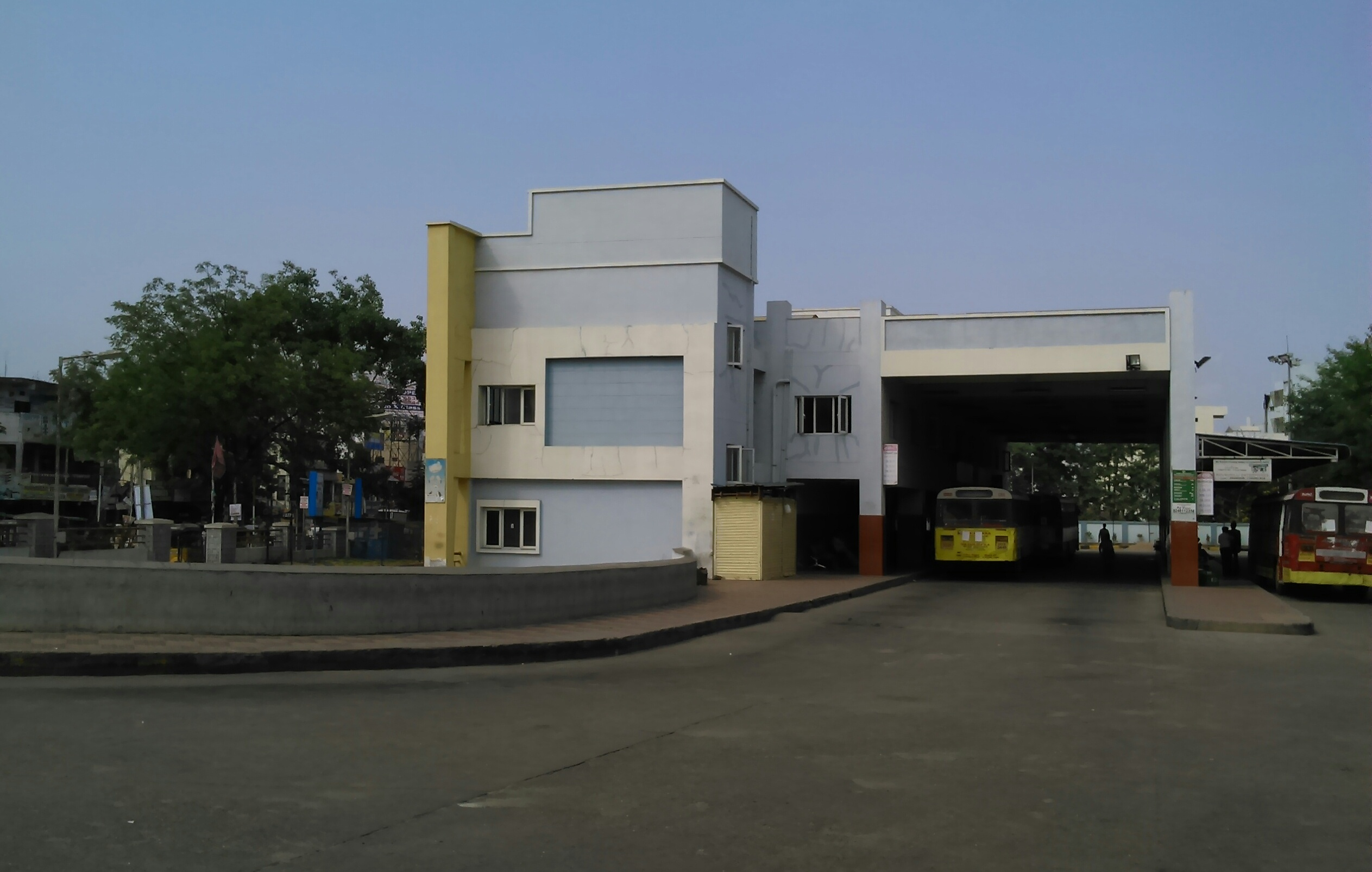
- Bus terminal at ECIL X Roads
- Interactive map of ECIL X Roads
- Coordinates: 17°28′24″N 78°34′15″E
- Country: India
- State: Telangana
- District: Medchal–Malkajgiri district
- City: Hyderabad

Government
  - Body: GHMC

Languages
  - Official: Telugu, Urdu, English
- Time zone: UTC+5:30 (IST)
- PIN: 500062
- Parliamentary constituency: Malkajgiri
- Assembly constituency: Uppal
- Planning agency: HUDA
- Civic agency: GHMC

ECIL X Roads or ECIL Cross Roads is a major commercial center in Hyderabad, Telangana, India. It is an important intersection located between some of the densest residential areas in Secunderabad, including Kushaiguda and Moula Ali. The suburb is named after ECIL Factory located nearby on the road to Cherlapally. A TSRTC Bus Terminal is located beside the crossroads. The roads intersecting here are the Trimulgherry-ECIL road (through Neredmet and AS Rao Nagar) and the Tarnaka-Kushaiguda road (through Lalapet and Moula Ali) that starts at Tarnaka Crossroads on the Inner Ring Road. Radhika Crossroads is another major intersection located just a kilometre away on the Trimulgherry-ECIL road and Moula Ali-Dammaiguda road.

== Transport ==
It has good connectivity of buses by TSRTC, which has a bus terminal right beside the junction. Much of the city is connected to ECIL Crossroads through this terminal, with major routes including:

- 3 (Kushaiguda - Afzalgunj)
  - 3K Kushaiguda - ECIL X Roads - Moula Ali - HB Colony - Lalapet - Tarnaka - Adikmet - Vidyanagar - Nallakunta - Kachiguda - Koti - Afzalgunj
  - 3KN Kushaiguda - ECIL X Roads - Moula Ali - HB Colony - Mallapur - Nacharam - Habsiguda - Tarnaka - Adikmet - Vidyanagar - Nallakunta - Kachiguda - Koti - Afzalgunj
- 16 (ECIL X Roads - Secunderabad)
  - 16A ECIL X Roads - Radhika X Roads - AS Rao Nagar - Neredmet Cross Roads - Old Neredmet - Vinayak Nagar, Safilguda - Anandbagh - Malkajgiri - Lallaguda - Mettuguda - Secunderabad
  - 16C ECIL X Roads - Radhika X Roads - AS Rao Nagar - Sainathpuram - Vinayak Nagar, Safilguda - Anandbagh - Malkajgiri - Lallaguda - Mettuguda - Secunderabad
  - 16H ECIL X Roads - Moula Ali - HB Colony - East Anandbagh - Anandbagh - Malkajgiri - Lallaguda - Mettuguda - Secunderabad
- 24S ECIL X Roads - Radhika X Roads - AS Rao Nagar - Neredmet - RK Puram - Lalbazar - Lothkunta - Temple Alwal - Old Alwal - Suchitra

The nearest Metro station is Tarnaka, 7 km away. Cherlapalli and Moula Ali are two nearby railway stations, with the nearest major station being Secunderabad Junction.
