= Malkajgiri Municipal Corporation =

Municipal government in Telangana, India

Type
- Type: Municipal corporation of Hyderabad

History
- Founded: 11 February 2026 (9 months ago)
- Preceded by: Greater Hyderabad Municipal Corporation

Leadership
- Mayor: Vacant (since 11 February 2026)
- Deputy Mayor: Vacant (since 11 February 2026)
- Municipal commissioner: T. Vinay Krishna Reddy, IAS (since 11 February 2026)
- Seats: 74

Meeting place
- HMDA Building, Tarnaka, Hyderabad

Website
- Official website

The Malkajgiri Municipal Corporation (MMC) is a civic body that governs the eastern and few parts of southern areas of Hyderabad, Telangana, within the Core Urban Region Economy (CURE) area. It is the local government responsible for the civic administration, including urban planning, sanitation, road maintenance and public health services. The corporation is governed by the Core Urban Region (Integrated Governance) Act, 2026. The headquarters and meeting place of the corporation is situated at the HMDA Building in Tarnaka, Hyderabad and has a total jurisdictional area of 727 km².

== History ==
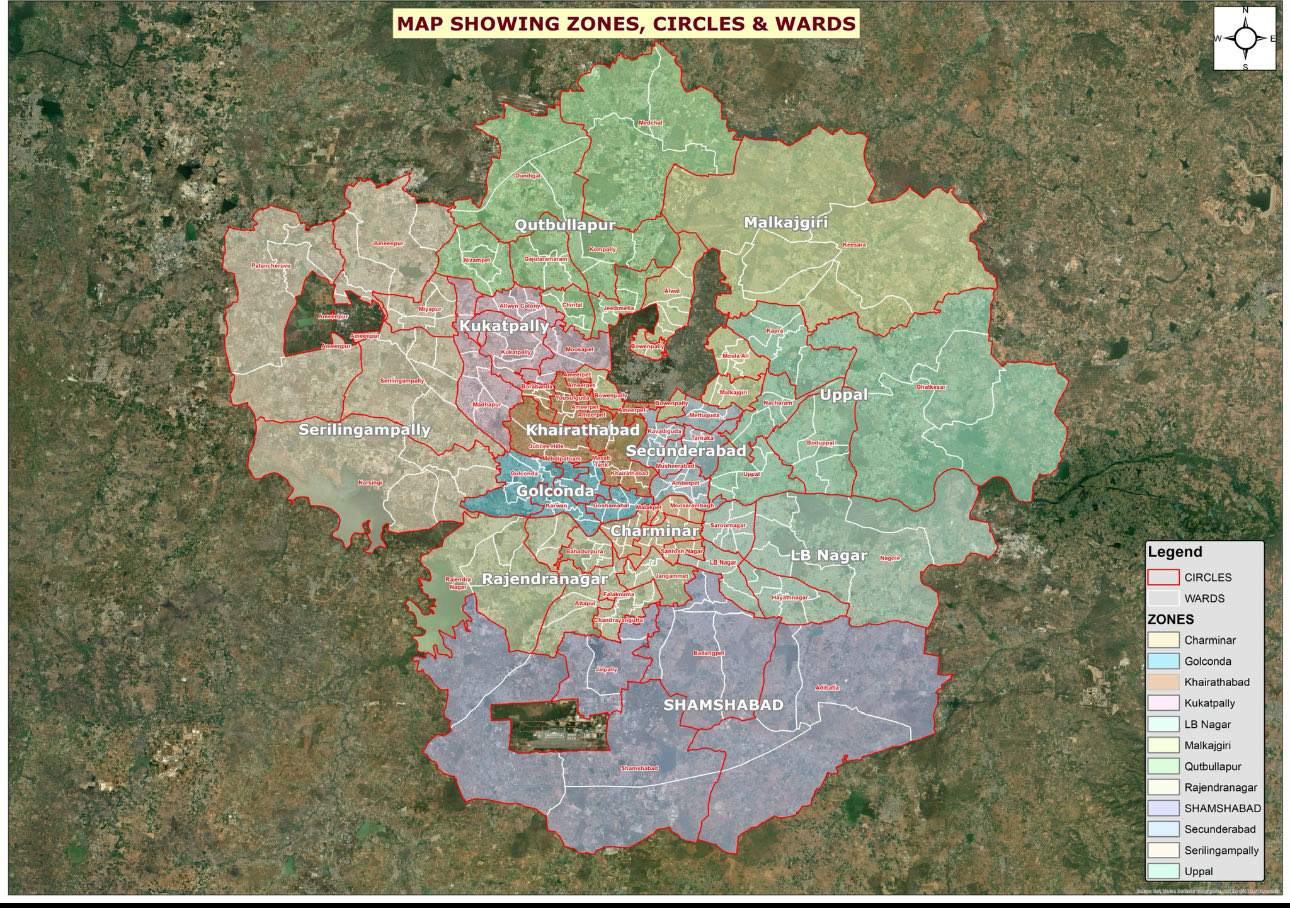
MMC alonge with GHMC and CMC

The MMC was established on 11 February 2026 following the re-organisation of the Greater Hyderabad Municipal Corporation as part of administrative restructuring in the metropolitan region. T. Vinay Krishna Reddy assumed charge as the first Municipal Commissioner of the corporation.

== Administrative structure ==
The MMC is administratively divided into three zones comprising 14 circles and 74 wards.

Zone		Circle		Ward
#	Name	#	Name	Name
1	Malkajgiri	1	Keesara	Keesara
1	Malkajgiri	1	Keesara	Chandrapuri Colony
1	Malkajgiri	1	Keesara	Jawaharnagar
1	Malkajgiri	1	Keesara	Dammaiguda
1	Malkajgiri	1	Keesara	Yapral
1	Malkajgiri	1	Keesara	Shamirpet
1	Malkajgiri	2	Alwal	Turakapally
1	Malkajgiri	2	Alwal	Macha Bollaram
1	Malkajgiri	2	Alwal	Alwal
1	Malkajgiri	2	Alwal	Venkatapuram
1	Malkajgiri	2	Alwal	Bhudevi Nagar
1	Malkajgiri	2	Alwal	Kanajiguda
1	Malkajgiri	3	Bowenpally	Monda Market
1	Malkajgiri	3	Bowenpally	Fateh Nagar
1	Malkajgiri	3	Bowenpally	Prakash Nagar
1	Malkajgiri	3	Bowenpally	Old Bowenpally
1	Malkajgiri	3	Bowenpally	Hasmathpet
1	Malkajgiri	4	Moula Ali	Balram Nagar
1	Malkajgiri	4	Moula Ali	Vinayak Nagar
1	Malkajgiri	4	Moula Ali	Moula Ali
1	Malkajgiri	4	Moula Ali	Kakatiya Nagar
1	Malkajgiri	4	Moula Ali	Neredmet
1	Malkajgiri	5	Malkajgiri	East Anandbagh
1	Malkajgiri	5	Malkajgiri	Mirjalguda
1	Malkajgiri	5	Malkajgiri	Gautham Nagar
1	Malkajgiri	5	Malkajgiri	Malkajgiri
2	Uppal	6	Ghatkesar	Nagaram
2	Uppal	6	Ghatkesar	Ghatkesar
2	Uppal	6	Ghatkesar	Edulabad
2	Uppal	6	Ghatkesar	Pocharam
2	Uppal	7	Kapra	Vampuguda
2	Uppal	7	Kapra	Kapra
2	Uppal	7	Kapra	A. S. Rao Nagar
2	Uppal	7	Kapra	Kushaiguda
2	Uppal	7	Kapra	Cherlapally
2	Uppal	8	Nacharam	Shakthi Sai Nagar
2	Uppal	8	Nacharam	H. B. Colony
2	Uppal	8	Nacharam	Mallapur
2	Uppal	8	Nacharam	Nacharam
2	Uppal	8	Nacharam	H. M. T. Nagar
2	Uppal	9	Uppal	Chilkanagar
2	Uppal	9	Uppal	Beerappagadda
2	Uppal	9	Uppal	Habsiguda
2	Uppal	9	Uppal	Ramanthapur
2	Uppal	9	Uppal	Venkat Reddy Nagar
2	Uppal	9	Uppal	Uppal
2	Uppal	10	Boduppal	Medipally
2	Uppal	10	Boduppal	Peerzadiguda
2	Uppal	10	Boduppal	Boduppal
2	Uppal	10	Boduppal	Chengicherla
3	L. B. Nagar	11	Nagole	Nagole
3	L. B. Nagar	11	Nagole	Mansoorabad
3	L. B. Nagar	11	Nagole	Geological Survey of India
3	L. B. Nagar	11	Nagole	Lecturers Colony
3	L. B. Nagar	11	Nagole	Kuntloor
3	L. B. Nagar	11	Nagole	Pedda Amberpet
3	L. B. Nagar	12	Saroornagar	Kothapet
3	L. B. Nagar	12	Saroornagar	Chaitanyapuri
3	L. B. Nagar	12	Saroornagar	Gaddiannaram
3	L. B. Nagar	12	Saroornagar	Saroornagar
3	L. B. Nagar	12	Saroornagar	Doctors Colony
3	L. B. Nagar	12	Saroornagar	Rama Krishna Puram
3	L. B. Nagar	12	Saroornagar	N. T. R. Nagar
3	L. B. Nagar	13	L. B. Nagar	Lingojiguda
3	L. B. Nagar	13	L. B. Nagar	Champapet
3	L. B. Nagar	13	L. B. Nagar	Karmanghat
3	L. B. Nagar	13	L. B. Nagar	Bairamalguda
3	L. B. Nagar	13	L. B. Nagar	Hastinapuram
3	L. B. Nagar	14	Hayathnagar	B. N. Reddy Nagar
3	L. B. Nagar	14	Hayathnagar	Vanasthalipuram
3	L. B. Nagar	14	Hayathnagar	Chintalakunta
3	L. B. Nagar	14	Hayathnagar	High Court Colony
3	L. B. Nagar	14	Hayathnagar	Sahebnagar
3	L. B. Nagar	14	Hayathnagar	Hayathnagar

== See also ==
- Administrative divisions of Hyderabad
- Hyderabad Metropolitan Development Authority
