= Kapra Lake =

- Location within Hyderabad
- Location: Kapra, Secunderabad, India
- Coordinates: 17.49558°N 78.55278°E
- Type: Natural lake
- Primary inflows: Yapral Lake
- Primary outflows: YadiBai kunta YellareddyGuda, Nagaram Annarayan Cheruvu
- Basin countries: India
- Surface area: 113 acres (46 ha)
- Average depth: 547.873 m (1,797.48 ft)
- Max. depth: 551.614 m (1,809.76 ft)
- Surface elevation: 1,759 ft (536 m)
- Settlements: Kapra and Yapral

Kapra lake or Oora Cheruvu is a lake located in the Kapra Village near Sainikpuri in the north-east part of Greater Hyderabad, India. Length of its bund is measured at 1254 Meters.

== Overview ==
There are two feeder channels, two sluices, and two surplus courses for the Kapra Lake, this lake being part of a chain of water bodies, wherein the surplus course of the upper water body flows down into the lower water body. Kapra lake gets water from yapral lake and Kowkoor lake. Thus, the Kapra Lake is intimately linked in the chain of the R.K. Puram lake, the Annarayan Cheruvu of Nagaram and the Yadi Bai Gunta of Yellareddy Guda.

== History ==
In the early 2000s this lake was deemed pristine and pollution free but in 2012 it was reported as polluted and susceptible to encroachments by the GHMC. According to survey conducted in 2002, the area of the lake was 113 acres (0.46 km^{2}) but due to land encroachments, area is reduced to 70 acres (0.28 km^{2}). A part of the Kapra Lake stands encroached for the past few years and the Greater Hyderabad Municipal Corporation recently listed 25 structures as encroachments of the Karpra Lake liable for demolition, including Sri Venkateshwara Temple. Out of the original 50 FTL pillars fixed by the Greater Hyderabad Municipal Corporation and the Hyderabad Lake Management Circle of the Irrigation Department, 13 pillars stand disturbed and removed by the encroachers. Efforts are underway to re-fix the missing pillars in order to prevent further encroachments. As a part of the citizens' initiative to protect the Kapra Lake, a rudimentary Lake Protection Body has been formed but it has largely remained ineffective. In 2017, there were reports of Kapra lake choked by illegal construction.

== Citizen led movement to Save Kapra Lake ==
In 2025 , an NGO was formed called Kapra Lake Revival Group- with the primary goal of reviving the Kapra Lake. The NGO does regular clean up drives at the lake and additionally has done several awareness drives to help protect the lake,

== See also ==
- Ramakrishnapuram Lake
- Safilguda Lake
