= Kakatiya Nagar =

- Colony in Neredmet
- Location in Telangana, India Kakatiya Nagar (Telangana) Kakatiya Nagar (India)
- Coordinates: 17.4756244°N 78.5416970°E
- Country: India
- State: Telangana
- District: Medchal-Malkajgiri
- City: Hyderabad
- Neighbourhood: Neredmet

Government
  - Body: GHMC - Malkajgiri

Area
  - Total: 2 km^{2} (0.77 sq mi)
- Elevation: 50 m (160 ft)

Languages
  - Official: Telugu, Urdu
- Time zone: UTC+5:30 (IST)
- PIN Code: 500 056
- Lok Sabha constituency: Malkajgiri
- Vidhan Sabha constituency: Malkajgiri
- Planning agency: HMDA

Kakatiya Nagar is one of the largest and the oldest colonies of Neredmet in Secunderabad City in the Indian State of Telangana. It falls under Malkajgiri mandal of Medchal-Malkajgiri district. It is currently administered under Malkajgiri Circle of GHMC. Law and order of Kakatiya Nagar sub-region is under the purview of Neredmet Police Station.

== Localities in Neredmet Kakatiya nagar ==
The colonies of the Kakatiya Nagar sub-region are as follows:

- East Dinakar Nagar
- West Kakatiya Nagar
- East Kakatiya Nagar
- East Deen dayal Nagar
- West Deen dayal Nagar
- RKH Colony
- Amedhkar Nagar
- Samathanagar
- Vinobhanagar
- Gokul Nagar
- Hill Colony
- Shiva Sai Nagar
- Sainik Vihar
- JK colony ( Ancient Devathala Bavi Area)
- Parvati Nagar
- Vajpayee nagar

== Transportation ==
Kakatiya Nagar is well connected by TSRTC City Bus services with ECIL X Roads and Secunderabad Junction railway station. The bus stops in Kakatiya Nagar include:

- Neredmet Old Police station (East Side)
- Kakatiya Nagar (West)
- Gowri Shankar Apartments (Kakatiya Nagar)
- Kakatiya Nagar
- Vinobha Nagar
- Sainikpuri X Road Bus Stop

Ramakistapuram Gate Railway Station is the nearest suburban railway station, Neredmet Railway Station.

== Schools, Hospitals and Religious places ==
=== Schools ===
- Kairali Vidya Bhavan
- Little Pearls High School
- St Sai Grammar High School
- Sri Nagendra High School, Deendayal Nagar
- St Marks Grammar High School, Deendayal Nagar
- Pasha Public School

=== Hospitals ===
- Sriya Hospital
- Sri Srinivasa Ayurvedic Hospital

=== Religious places ===
- Sri Lakshmi Narasimha Swamy Temple, Kakatiya Nagar
- Sri Vijaya Vinayaka Panchayat Devasthan, Deendayal Nagar
- Saibaba Temple, Samathanagar
- CSI Church Neredmet
- GCBC CHURCH
- Amebadhkar Nagar Mosque
