= Vinayak Nagar =

Vinayak Nagar Gubadigutta
- Locality
- Location in the state of Telangana, India Vinayak Nagar (Telangana) Vinayak Nagar (India)
- Coordinates: 17°26′54″N 78°31′45″E
- Country: India
- State: Telangana
- District: Medchal–Malkajgiri
- City: Hyderabad

Government
  - Body: GHMC

Area
  - Total: 1.7 km^{2} (0.66 sq mi)

Languages
  - Official: Telugu
- Time zone: UTC+5:30 (IST)
- PIN Code Postal Area and Head Office: 500056
- Vehicle registration: TG-08
- Lok Sabha constituency: Malkajgiri
- Vidhan Sabha constituency: Malkajgiri
- Planning agency: Hyderabad Metropolitan Development Authority

Vinayak Nagar is a locality and a ward in Neredmet neighbourhood of Hyderabad city. It falls under Malkajgiri mandal of Medchal-Malkajgiri district of Indian State of Telangana. It is administered as Ward No. 137 of Greater Hyderabad Municipal Corporation.

== Etymology ==
Vinayak Nagar was earlier called as Gubadi Gutta or Gubadi hill. Before the 1970s, this was a forest area in Neredmet Village. In 1980's the total area was encorched by local people converted it as a Basti or Slum, And also named as Vinayak Nagar.

== Locaties of Vinayak Nagar ==
- Vinayak Nagar Basthi
- Tarkrama Nagar Basthi
- East Dinakar Nagar Colony
- West Dinakar Nagar Colony

== Transportation ==
Vinayak Nagar is well connected by TSRTC city bus services with Secunderabad and ECIL X Roads. Nearest railway station is Safilguda railway station and nearest metro is Mettuguda metro station.
