= A. S. Rao Nagar =

Neighbourhood in Hyderabad, Telangana, India

A. S. Rao Nagar Dr. A. S. Rao Nagar
- Neighbourhood
- Location in Hyderabad, India A. S. Rao Nagar (India)
- Coordinates: 17°28′23″N 78°33′59″E
- Country: India
- State: Telangana
- District: Medchal-Malkajgiri District
- City: Hyderabad
- Established: 1970
- Named for: Dr. Ayyagari Sambasiva Rao

Government
  - Type: Municipal Corporation
  - Body: GHMC (Kapra Circle)
- Elevation: 543 m (1,781 ft)

Languages
  - Official: Telugu
- Time zone: UTC+5:30 (IST)
- PIN code: 500062
- Vehicle registration: TG-08
- Parliament constituency: Malkajgiri
- Assembly constituency: Uppal
- Civic agency: GHMC
- Planning agency: HMDA

A. S. Rao Nagar, also known as Dr. A. S. Rao Nagar, is a major commercial and residential neighbourhood of Hyderabad, Telangana, India. It is located in the north eastern side of the city falling under Kapra Village & Mandal, Medchal-Malkajgiri district. It is administered as Ward No. 2 of Greater Hyderabad Municipal Corporation.

In 2012 A. S. Rao Nagar's high street area had the steepest hike in rental prices across the country. It has many residential townships like Saket which is near suburbs including Neredmet, ECIL, Sainikpuri and Moula-Ali.

== History ==
It is named after Dr. Ayyagari Sambasiva Rao (Dr. A.S.Rao), the founder of the Electronics Corporation of India (ECIL) in Hyderabad. He was instrumental in forming ECIL Employees Co-Operative House Construction Society Limited in 1976, for the benefit of the employees of Department of Atomic Energy, ECIL, NFC and TIFR.

== Economy ==
Many specialist retail outlets and commercial buildings have their establishments in the area. Most reputed brands like She Needs, Tanishq, Malabar and most fashion brands in sports and clothing have retail outlets.

== Transport ==
The neighbourhood is well connected to different parts of the cities. Many TSRTC buses operate from the area. The nearest local train station is R. K. Puram Railway Station and Moula-Ali. The suburb is well connected to Ghatkesar, ECIL, Neredmet, Keesara, Sainikpuri and Malkajgiri.
