= Malkajgiri =

Malkajgiri Mallikarjuna Giri
- Suburb, GHMC Circle, Sub-District
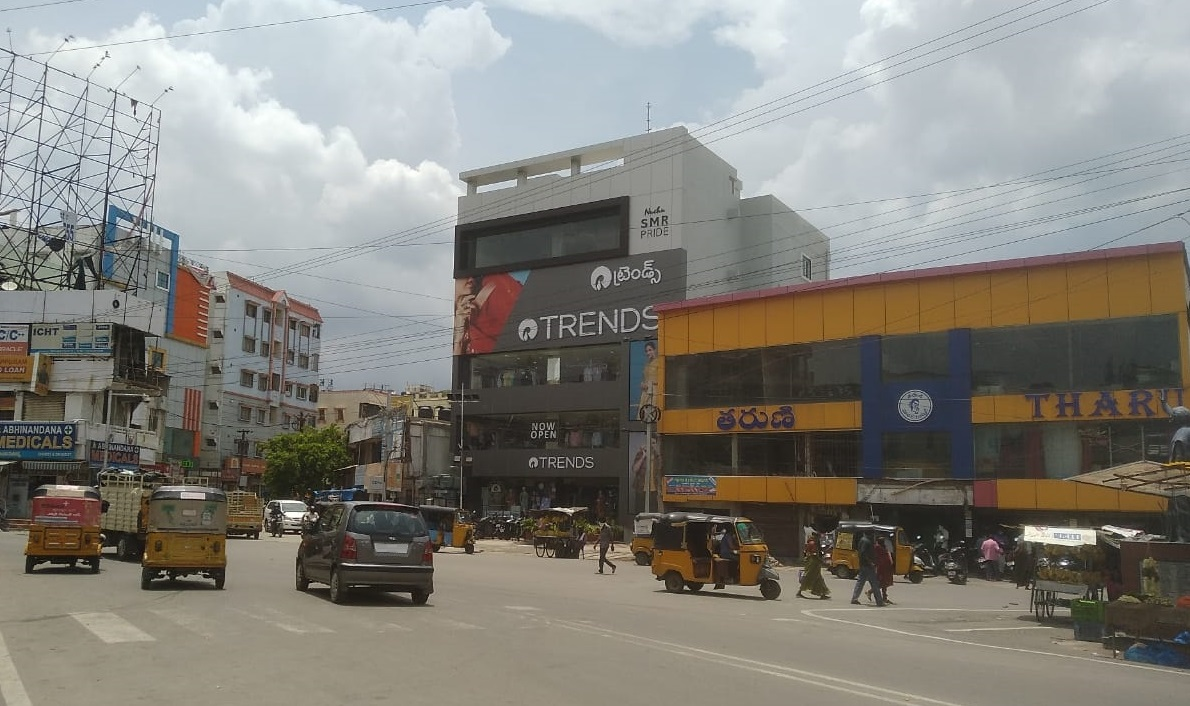
- Malkajgiri 'x' Roads

- Malkajgiri (Telangana) Malkajgiri (Telangana) Malkajgiri (India)
- Coordinates: 17°27′01.1″N 78°31′55.9″E
- Country: India
- State: Telangana
- District: Medchal–Malkajgiri
- City: Greater Hyderabad
- Founded: 1578 AD
- Incorporated (town): 1965
- Incorporated (Corporation): 1985
- Named for: Mallikarjuna Swamy

Government
  - Body: Malkajgiri Municipal Corporation T. Vinay Krishna Reddy, IAS Municipal commissioner

Area
  - Total: 685 km^{2} (264 sq mi)
- Elevation: 556 m (1,824 ft)

Population (2020)
  - Total: 141,175
  - Density: 206/km^{2} (534/sq mi)

Languages
  - Official: Telugu
- Time zone: UTC+5:30 (IST)
- PIN Codes: Malkajgiri, Mirjalguda & Hanumanpet -500047, ( Ramakrishnapuram, Neredmet, Old Safilguda & Sainathpuram -500056), ( Moula Ali, HB Colony -500040), ( Sainikpuri, Defence colony & Ammuguda -500094),( AS Rao Nagar & Gokul Nagar -500062), ( Yapral & JJ Nagar -500087)
- Vehicle registration: TG-08
- Lok Sabha constituency: Malkajgiri
- Vidhan Sabha constituency: Malkajgiri
- Planning agency: Hyderabad Metropolitan Development Authority

Malkajgiri also known as Mallikarjuna Giri (ancient name) is a suburb of Hyderabad, Telangana, India. It is located in Medchal–Malkajgiri district and also Sub-District in Medchal District is the headquarters of Malkajgiri mandal in Malkajgiri revenue division. Erstwhile Malkajgiri Major Grampanchayat was upgraded to a municipality in 1965 and became a municipal corporation in 2007. It was merged into the Greater Hyderabad Municipal Corporation in 2007. It was a part of Ranga Reddy district before the re-organisation of districts in 2016.

== Etymology ==
The ancient name of Malkajgiri was Mallikarjuna Giri (Before 1936's), dedicated to Mallikarjuna Swamy Temple on Hills. Which eventually turned as the present. Earlier Malkajgiri has its own fort. Now its became ruins, we see walls and watch towers in Old Malkajgiri Area - Shaw Wallace Factory (Present).

The lakes like Safilguda Nadimi cheruvu, Safilguda Banda cheruvu, Ramakrishnapuram Munkidigan cheruvu are famous which falls under Neredmet (Esterwile Village). And also lots of small ponds which are vanished now. It has well connections with Moula-Ali history.

== Demographics ==
As of the 2001 India census, Malkajgiri had a population of 413,571. The population is 51% male and 49% female. Malkajgiri has an average literacy ratio of 87% with a total of 321,525 literates. In terms of literacy, Malkajgiri ranked at first in the Rangareddy district, higher than the national averages of 59.5%; male literacy is 72%, and female literacy is 65%. In Malkajgiri, 7% of the population is under 6 years of age.

== History ==
Malkajgiri mandal before bifurcated used to be much larger, It consisted of two municipal units. They are Malkajgiri & Alwal Municipalities.

- Malkajgiri : Malkajgiri, Mirjalguda, Moulali, Neredmet, Yapral, Kowkoor.
- Alwal : Maccha Bollaram, Venkatapuram.
- After district bifurcation "or" formation Alwal Municipality became a New Mandal "Alwal mandal."

== Villages in Malkajgiri Mandal ==
Malkajgiri is a Mandal in Ranga Reddy (Eastrwile) district of Telangana state in India. Below is the list of Towns and Villages in Malkajgiri Mandal. Total Number of Villages in this Mandal list are 7.

- Alwal (Municipality)
- Ammuguda
- Kowkur
- Lothkunta
- Macha Bolaram
- Malkajgiri (Municipality)
- Yapral

Later some villages merged in Alwal and formed Alwal Mandal by burificating Malkajgiri Mandal in 2017.

At Present now Malkajgiri Mandal has following neighbourhoods erstwhile Villages:

Malkajgiri has two revenue villages. They are Malkajgiri and Ammuguda Villages. Malkajgiri Major Village Consists of,

- Malkajgiri Main Village (Including Talla Basthi, Hanumanpet, Mirzalguda earlier Hamlet villages)
- Neredmet Main Village (Including earlier Hamlet villages Safilguda, Ramakrishnapuram)
- Moula Ali (Some parts of it later merged into Cherlapally Village i.e. Cherlapally Jail to Moula Ali Sub Station Areas).

The Ammuguda revenue village consists of,

- Ammuguda Village

=== Localities with in Malkajgiri Village ===
Malkajgiri Village has six sub regions in it. They are Old Malkajgiri, Malkajgiri X Roads, Old Mirzalguda, New Mirzalguda, Anutex, Hanumanpet.

=== Old Malakajgiri ===
- Bala Saraswathi Nagar
- Kummari Wada Basthi
- Narsimha Reddy Nagar
- Maruthi Nagar
- Old Malkajgiri Village
- Durga Nagar
- Sathi Reddy Nagar
- Chinthal Basthi
- Venkateshwara Nagar
- Patel Nagar
- Shawallace liquor company Area.(Ancient Fort Ruins Area)

=== Malkajgiri X Roads ===
- Sanjay Nagar
- Sanjeev Nagar
- Brundavan Colony
- Venkateshwara Nagar
- Geetha Nagar (Municipal Office & District Hospital Area)
- Shawallace liquor company Area

=== Old Mirzalguda ===
- Old Mirzalguda
- Mirzalguda X Road
- Yadav Nagar
- Ekalavya Nagar
- Goutham Nagar
- Mallikarjuna Nagar ( Ancient Mallanna Temple Area)
- Veena Pani Nagar
- Raja Nagar
- Madhusudhan Nagar
- Malkajgri Railway Station Area
- Bank Colony
- Sivapuri Colony
- New Shivapuri Colony

=== New Mizalguda ===
- Raja Srinivas Nagar Colony
- BJR Nagar
- Vasanthapuri Colony
- Sripuri Colony
- Ambedkar Nagar
- PVN Colony
- Raghavendra Nagar
- Vasantha Vihar Colony
- Jawahar Nagar

=== Anutex ===
- Vani Nagar
- Bhavani Nagar
- Sai Nagar ( Sai Baba Temple)

=== Hanumanpet ===
- Joythi Nagar
- Gopal Nagar
- I. N. Nagar
- J.L.N.S Nagar (Jayagiri Lakshmi Narasimha Swamy Temple Area)
- Hill Top Colony
- Sri Ramanjaneya Nagar
- New Venkateshwara Nagar
- Budha Vihar

== Administration & Jurisdiction ==
Malkajgiri is administered by GHMC as Circle No. 28 which falls under Secunderabad Zone. It includes six wards which include:

- 136 Neredmet division
- 137 Vinayak nagar division
- 138 Moula Ali division
- 139 East anandbagh division
- 140 Malkajgiri division
- 141 Goutham Nagar division

Malkajgiri Mandal has also Administered by Mandal Revenue Office. It consists of Malkajgiri (M) Village & also Ammuguda Village.

Jurisdiction falls under Malkajgiri Metropolitan Court & 2 Police Station limits, Malkajgiri PS and Neredmet PS.

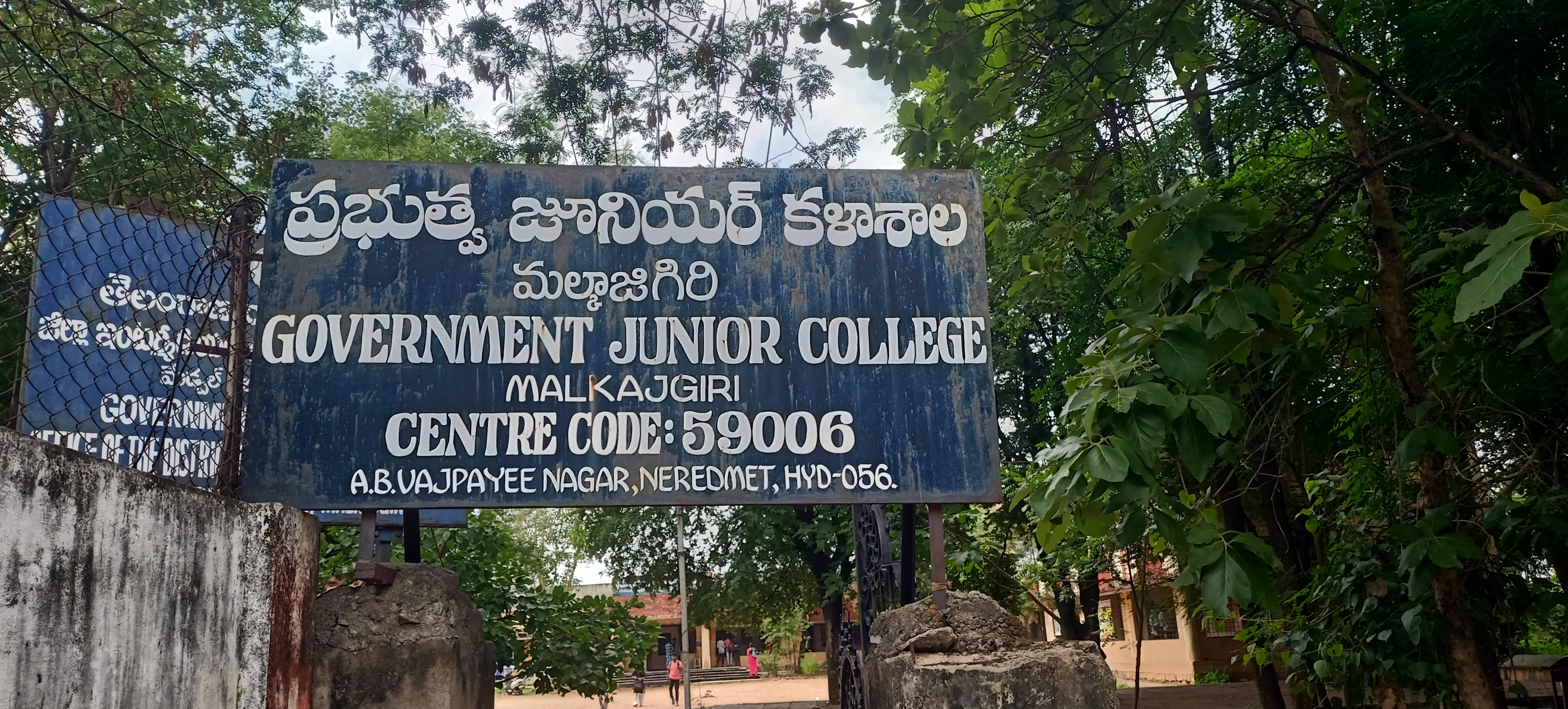
Malkajgiri Government Junior College

== Transport ==
Malkajgiri is well-connected with other parts of the city by road as well as rail. The Malkajgiri Junction Railway Station is located at the backside of St. Martins High School will soon be converted into a major junction. Until now the station has 4 tracks and 3 Platforms in which 2nd&3rd Platforms are only Electrified. There is a Railway Reservation Complex too. thereby connecting it to most of the places by rail route.

Nearest metro station is Mettuguda on Blue line of Hyderabad Metro.

=== Railway Stations ===
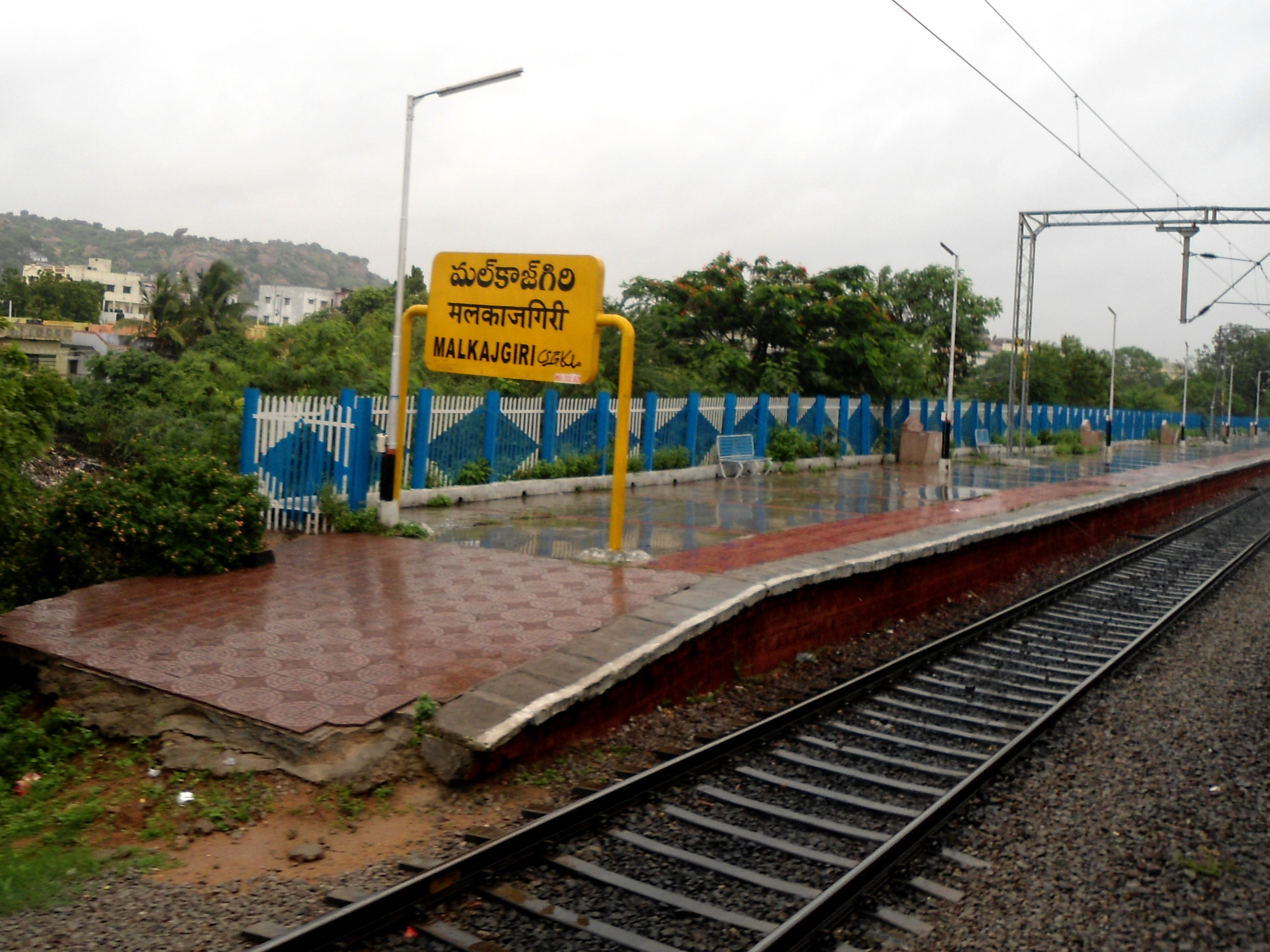
Malkajgiri Railway Station

Malkajgiri has six Suburban railway stations with two more under construction.

- Malkajgiri Junction Railway Station
- Moula Ali Railway Station
- Safilguda Railway Station
- Dayanandnagar Railway Station
- Ramakistapuram Gate Railway Station
- Ammuguda Railway Station

Under Construction - MMTS Phase

- Neredmet Railway Station
- Moula Ali HB Colony Railway Station

Malkajgiri is less than 15 drive from Secunderabad Railway Station. It is also just 3 km away from Mettuguda junction, where the road leading to Uppal and the International Airport is being expanded into eight lanes. Malkajgiri is an emotion

== Politics ==
Malkajgiri (Lok Sabha constituency) is India's largest constituency. The Malkajgiri (Assembly constituency) is a new constituency formed after the delimitation of constituencies. The General elections held in 2009 were the first elections to be held in this constituency. Akula Rajender Mudiraj was elected as MLA in 2009. In the 2014 general assembly elections, C. Kanaka Reddy (TRS) won by 2768 votes against Ram Chander Rao.N (BJP).

== Landmarks ==
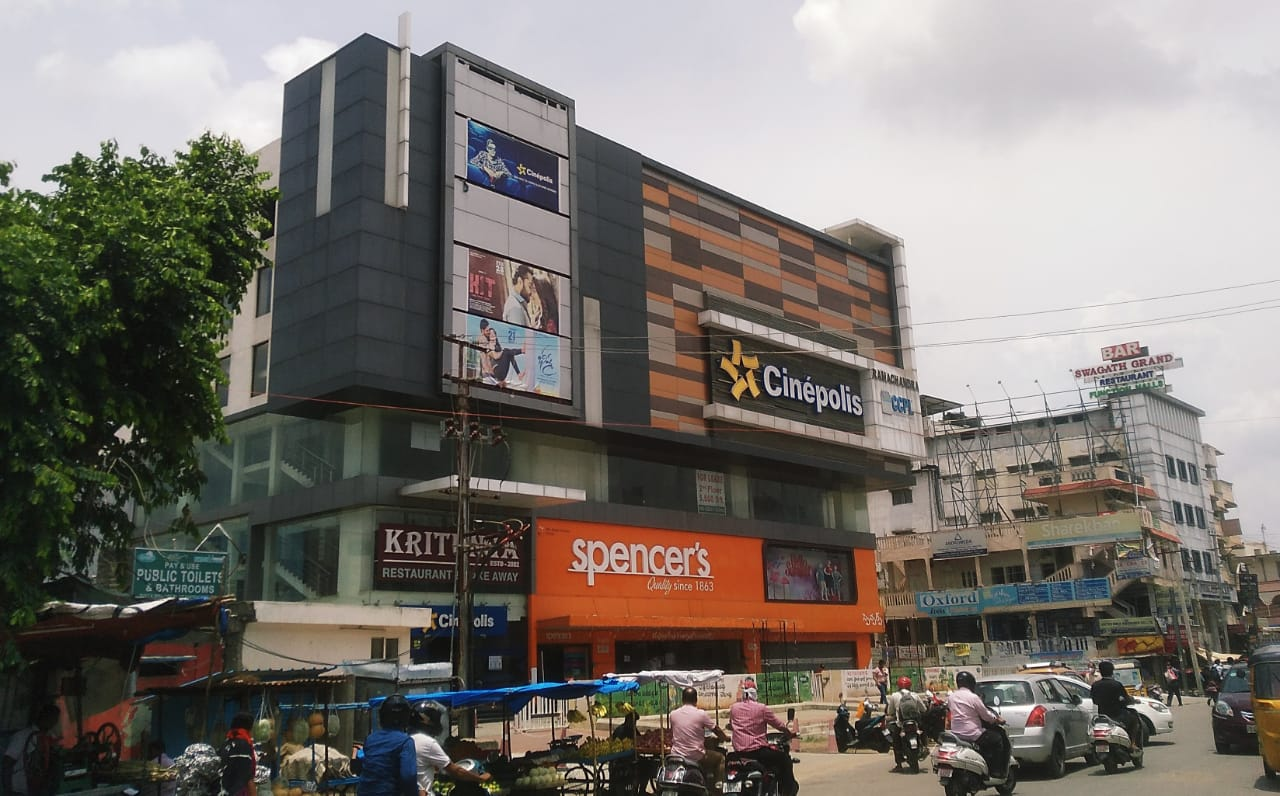
Cinepolis in Malkajgiri

- Neredumettu Nadimi Cheruvu
- Neredumettu Munkidigan Cheruvu
- Neredmet Banda Cheruvu
- Sai baba temple
- Neredmet Moodu Gullu
