= Hyderabad Kalibari =

Hindu temple in Hyderabad, India

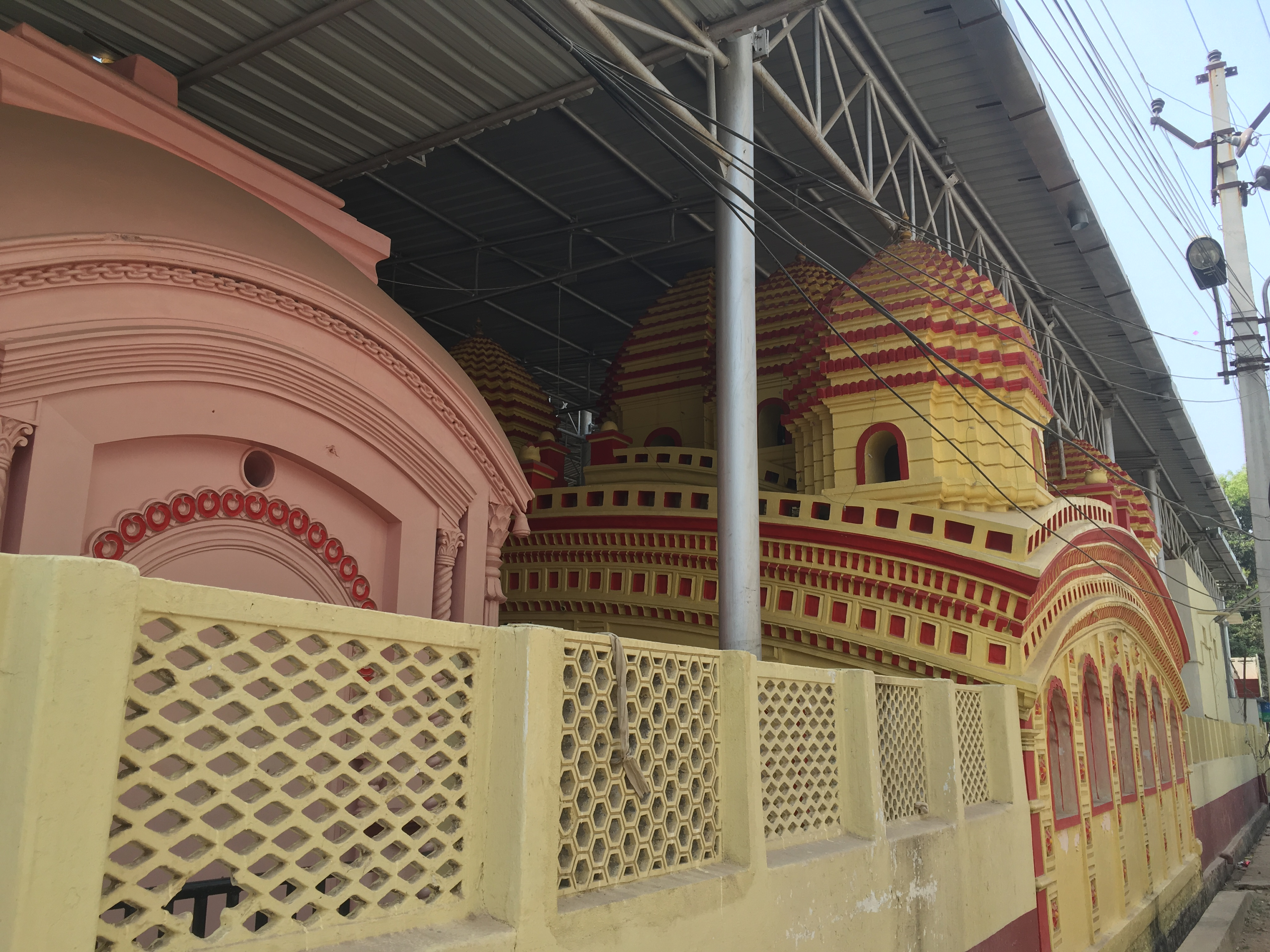

- Location within Telangana

Religion
- Affiliation: Hinduism
- District: Medchal–Malkajgiri
- Deity: Kali
- Festivals: Kali Puja, Durga Puja

Location
- Location: Vivekanandapuram, Neredmet
- State: Telangana
- Country: India
- Interactive map of Hyderabad Kalibari
- Coordinates: 17.291493714°N 78.315146734°E

Architecture
- Type: Bengal architecture
- Established: 24 August 1974
- Monument: 1

The Hyderabad Kalibari is a Hindu temple located in the Vivekanandapuram, Neredmet neighbourhood of Hyderabad, 7 km from Secunderabad Railway Station, Telangana, India. The presiding deity of the temple is goddess Kali, hence the name Kalibari or Abode of Kali. The temple is famous for its Kali Puja and Durga Puja which is held on October/November of every year during Dusshera and Diwali.

== History ==
In 1974, a piece of Land measuring about 2000 square yards was donated by the late Shree S.Madhusudan Reddy, ex-M.L.C. Malkajgiri a devotee of Ma Kali, to the Hyderabad Kalibari trust for building a Kali Temple. Subsequently, a number of devotees, in particular the late Lala Chowdhury Maman Ram Agarwal, a philanthropist came forward in collecting / offering donations substantially for the construction of the Kalibari at Vivekanandapuram, Neredmet, Secunderabad. The organization started in 1974 and the foundation stone was laid by the Swamy Ranganathanandaji Maharaj, the then President of Ramakrishna mission Hyderabad.

On 28 August 1976, an idol of Kalimata, which was made out of a single piece of black stone, was purchased from "Chitpur", West Bengal, which was in the pattern of Kalimata of Dakshineshwar temple at Kolkata. It was installed by Swamy Ranganathanandaji Maharaj of Ramakrishna Mission and the late Raja Sagi Suryanarayana Raju, the then Minister for Endowments, Government of Andhra Pradesh was the chief guest on this occasion. The idol sthapana and Pran Pratistha of the goddess was done by the late Sree Gostha Behari Bhattacherjee, Vidyaratna, a famous Tantric priest of famous "Chunagali Kali Temple" of Kolkata. Late Sree A.K.Ganguly, the 1st priest of Hyderabad Kalibari, assisted him in performing the pooja under vedic and tantric ways in accordance with shastrik injunctions.

Swamy Ranganathanandaji Maharaj was approached for guidance. He suggested that the Kalibari should be named as the "Hyderabad Kalibari". Devotees from various places visit the holy shrine in search of solace.

== About the temple ==
Today, Hyderabad Kalibari performs all the festivals related to Bengal, viz. Kali Puja, Durga Puja, Saraswati Puja, Annapurna Puja etc. All Amavasya (new moon) Pujas where Kali is worshipped in the temple. Devotees in large numbers gather on all such occasions. The Kalibari also has a free school for children where Bengali is taught. Also dancing and singing are taught every Sunday. The children take part in the social programmes which happen year round. The temple usually hosts close to 1500 devotees every year during Kali Puja, which also sees Bengali artistes performing in a variety of cultural programmes.

== Gallery ==
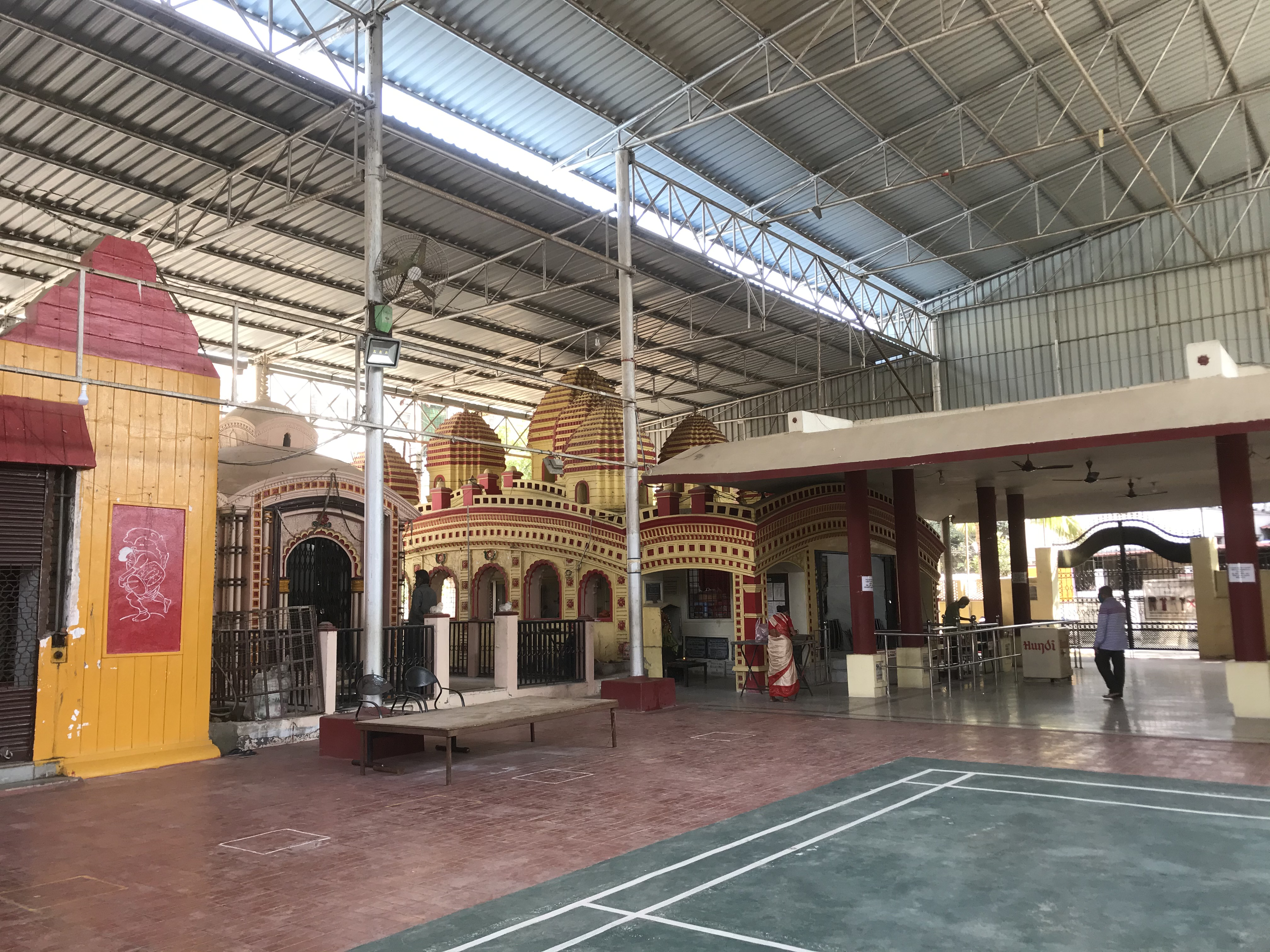
Hyderabad Kalibari's Thakur Dalan

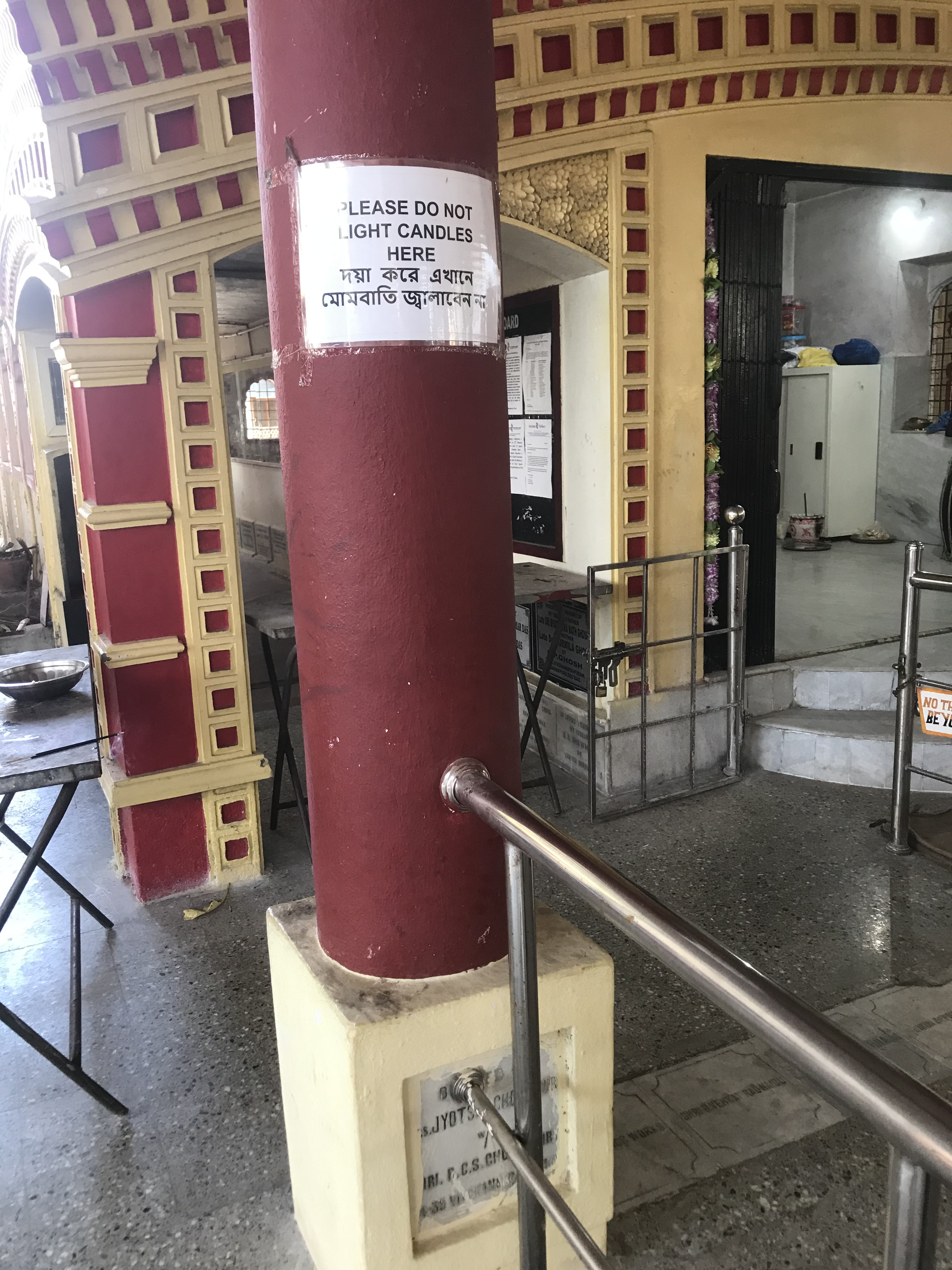
A notice requesting devotees not to light candles, at the said place

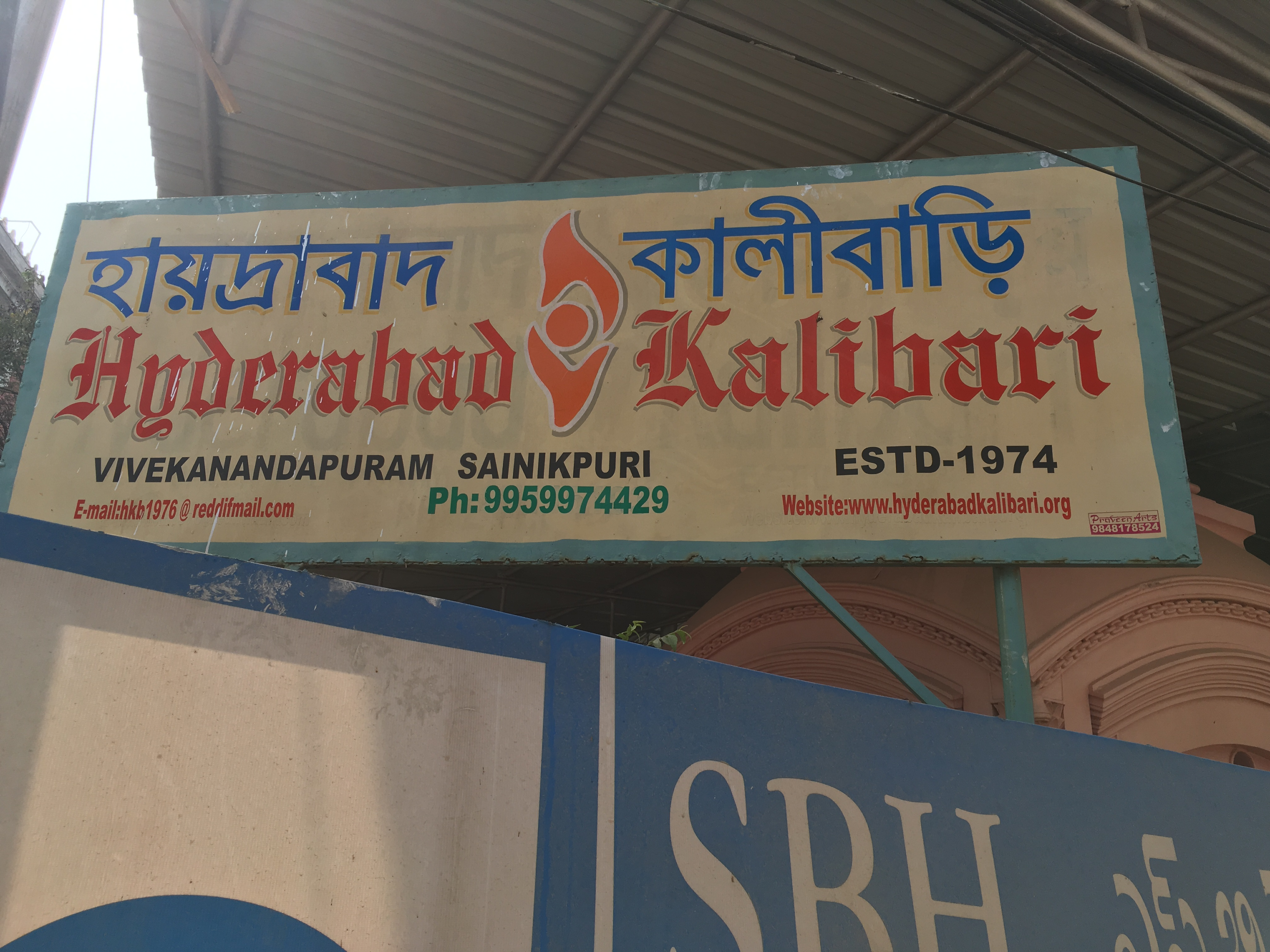
The nameboard outside the temple

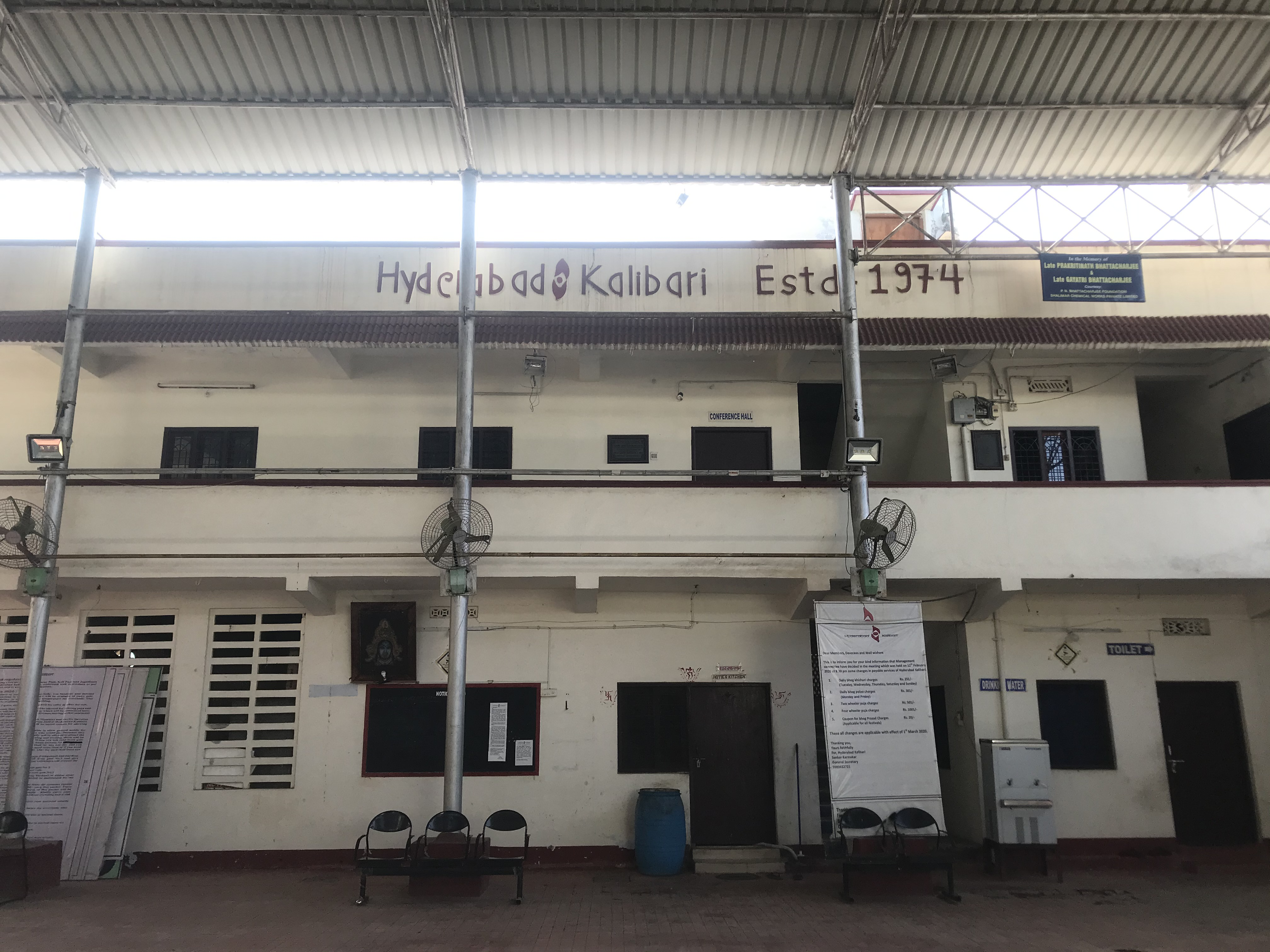
A residence building, located within the premises of the temple

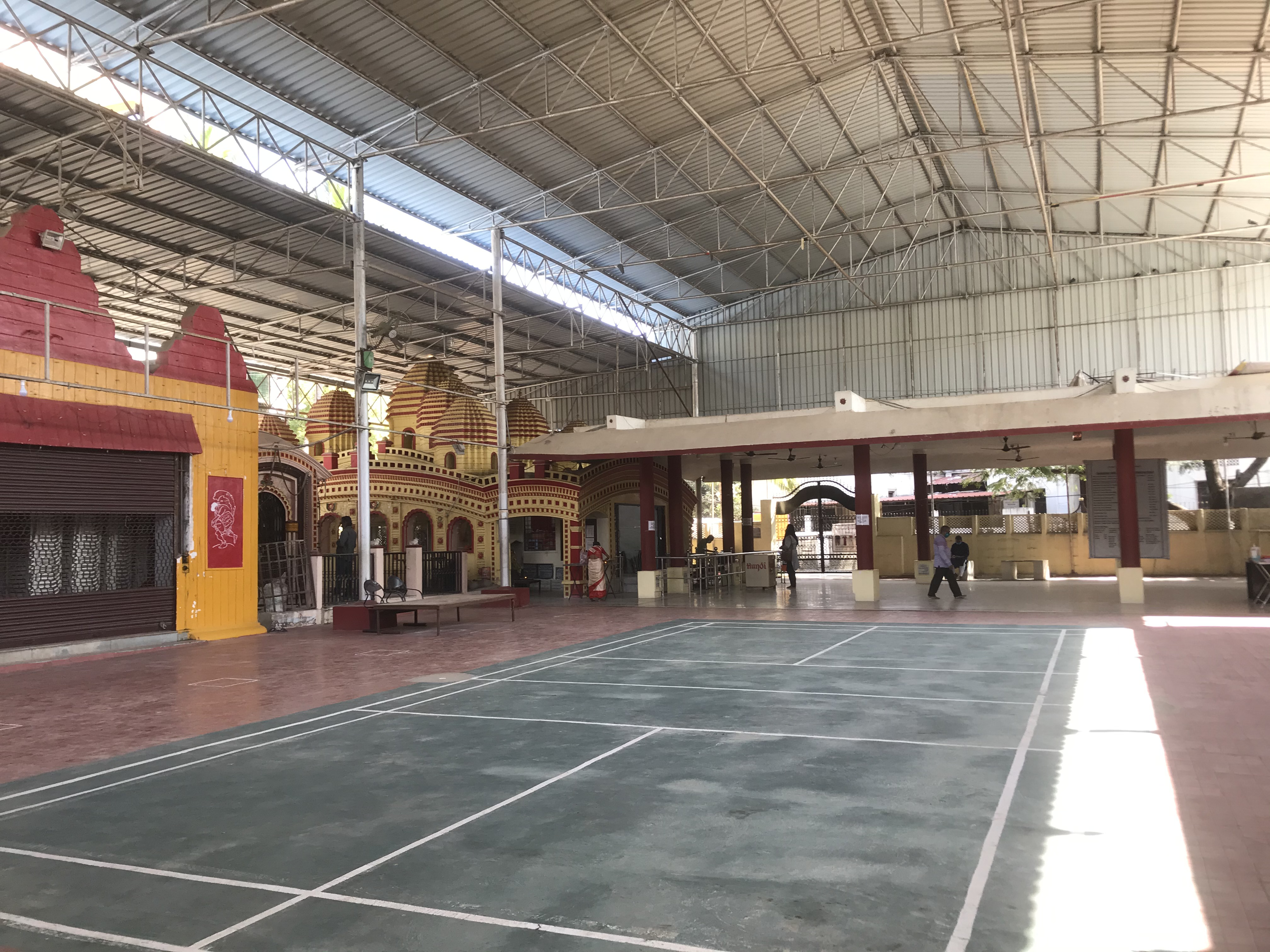
The entire view of the temple's interior

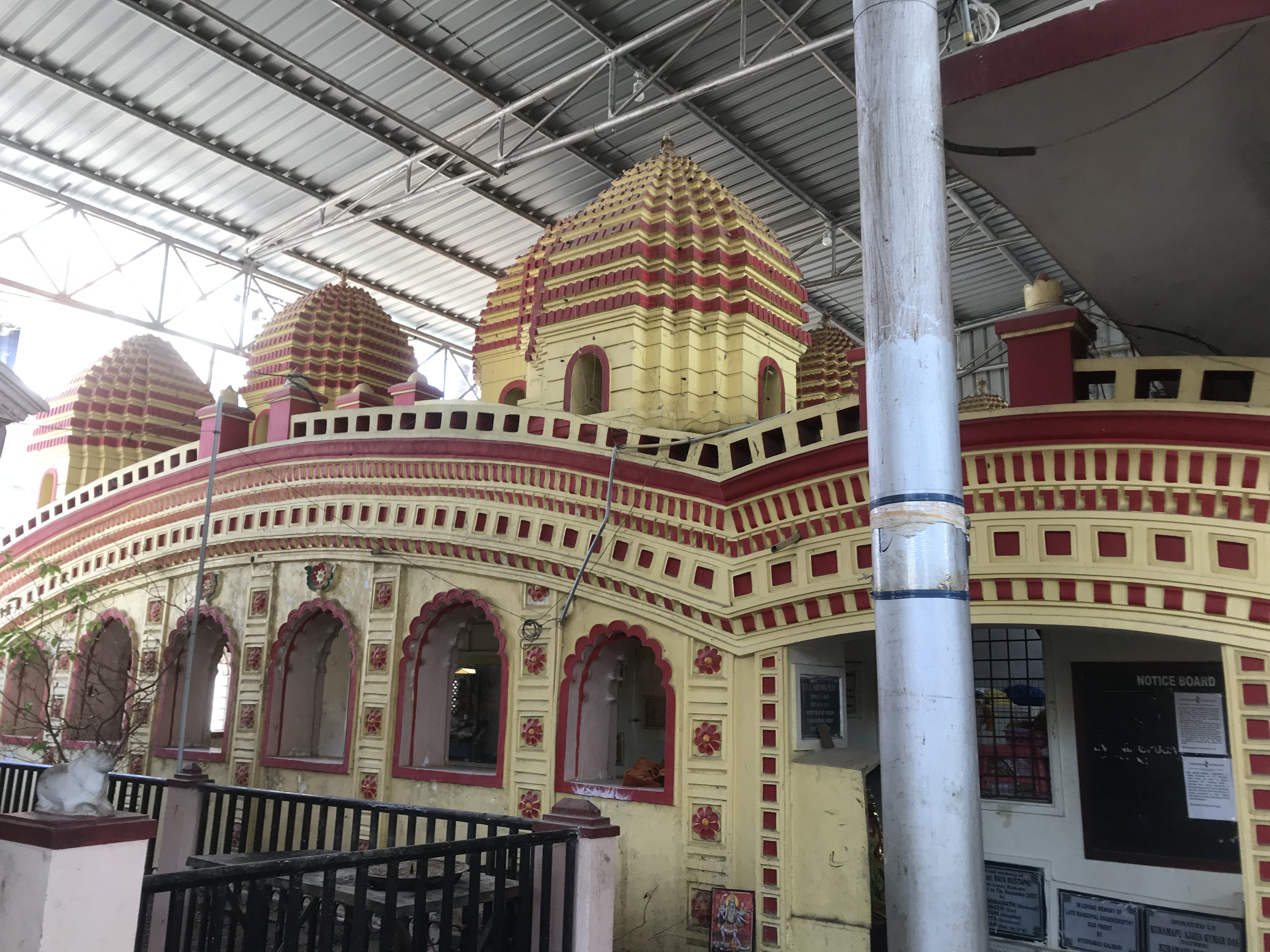
The architecture of the temple is atypical of Hindu temples and more so Kali temples in Bengal

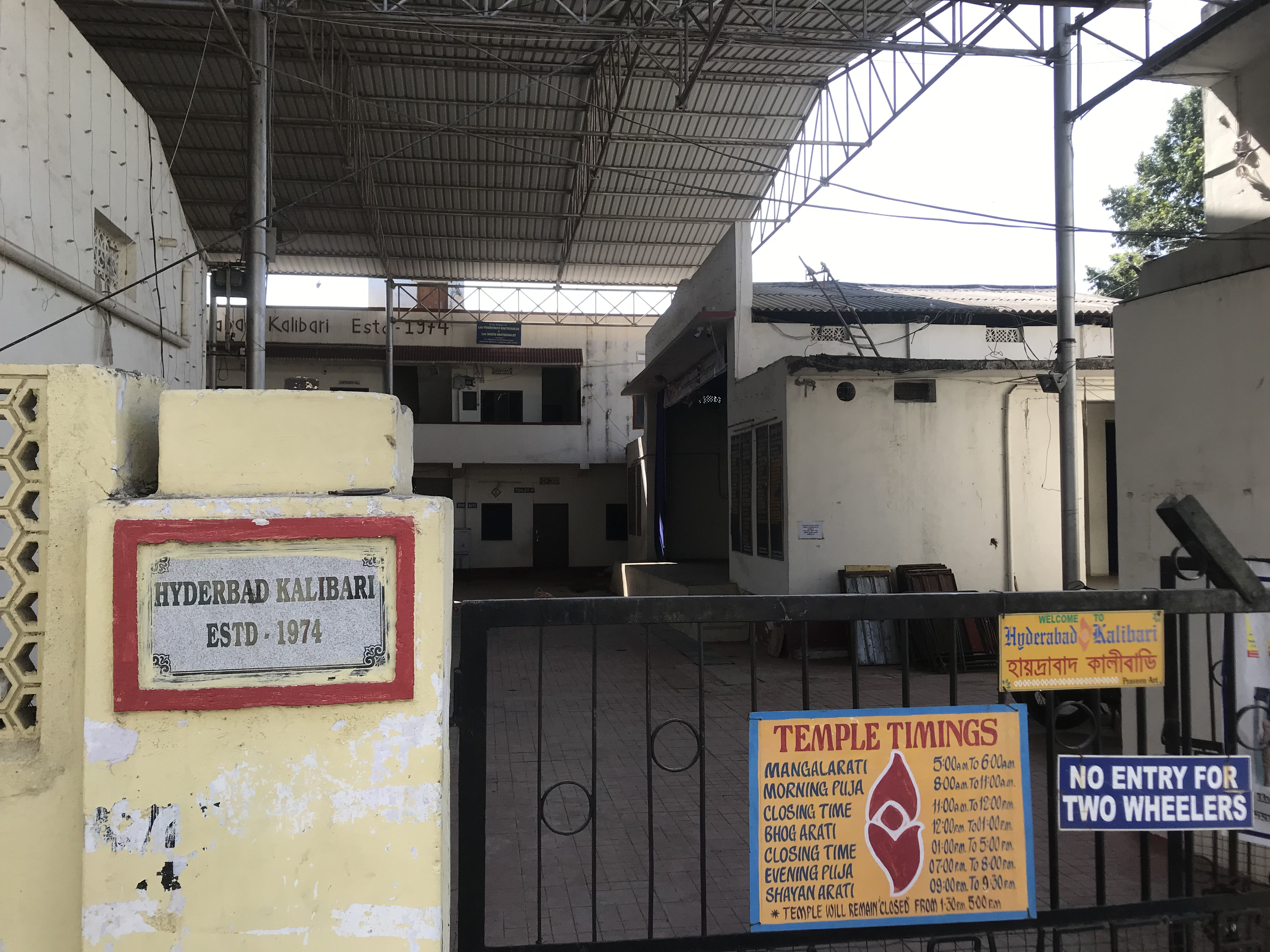
One of the entrances to the temple
