= Lubna Sarwath =

Indian social activist and economist

Adv Dr Lubna Sarwath

Personal details
- Born: Hyderabad, Andhra Pradesh, India (now in Telangana, India)
- Occupation: Social and Environmental Activist, Indian National Congress

Lubna Sarwath is an Indian social activist and economist who fought the 2014 Indian general election from Hyderabad (Lok Sabha constituency) as Aam Aadmi Party candidate.

== Biography ==
Lubna was selected in Probationary Officers Exam and joined as an officer in the Punjab National Bank. She completed Ph.D. programme in Islamic Economics and Finance (IEF) from Trisakti University, Jakarta, Indonesia. She was also a Visiting lecturer there on invitation. She got admission in Masters in both Islamic Economics in MIHE, UK and IIUM, Kuala Lumpur, but didn't study there. Lubna was on the editorial board for International Journal on Ethics and Systems, Emerald Publications, UK. Dr. Lubna is also an ecological activist, and was co-convener of NGO - SOUL (Save Our Urban Lakes) and was WICCI Water Resources Council State President Telangana for one year. In January 2017, she applied to be part of Telangana State Wakf Board. Lubna has also said that bodies like All India Muslim Personal Law Board, Jamaat-e-Islami Hind and Markazi Jamiat Ahle Hadees Hind are regressive organisations. Lubna has also opposed triple talaq. In July 2017, Lubna along with her SOUL members protested against GHMC for choking Kapra Lake and demanded the resignation of the Superintending Engineer (Hyderabad Lakes & Water bodies Management Circle) and the MRO (Keesara Mandal). In June 2018, Lubna and other activists moved a contempt plea in Hyderabad High court over ‘misuse’ of public funds in Dawat-e-Iftar at L.B. Stadium hosted by the Chief Minister of Telangana, Kalvakuntla Chandrashekar Rao. She claimed that Telangana government spent ₹ 66 crore on the iftar party.

Lubna quit Aam Aadmi Party in March 2015. Lubna fought election from Karwan (Assembly constituency) as Socialist Party (India) candidate in 2018 Telangana Legislative Assembly election. She is member of Indian National Congress. She contested as Independent for Corporator of Asifnagar ward.
