= DAV Safilguda =

D.A.V. Public School
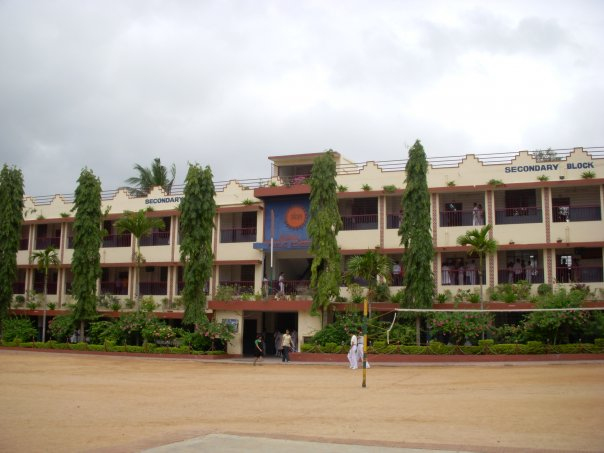

Location
- Old Safilguda, Neredmet; Hyderabad, Telangana, 500056; India; 17.4638°N 78.5442°E

Information
- School type: Public
- Established: 1985
- School board: C.B.S.E.
- Principal: Mr.VNNK SESHADRI
- Campus size: 3 acres
- Houses: Dayanand (Yellow); Virjanand (Green); Shraddhanand (Blue); Hansraj (Red)
- Colors: Blue, red, yellow and green
- Website: Official website

Dayanand Anglo Vedic Public School (DAV), Old Safilguda, Neredmet is a school in Hyderabad, India. It follows the CBSE curriculum. It is situated in Neredmet, Hyderabad and has about 4,700 students. It is one of the most well-known CBSE schools in the city. It has several buses enabling easy transport of students from various parts of the city.

== The School ==
DAV Safilguda was established in 1985 as the first DAV School under the South Zone regional directorate of the DAVCMC (DAV College Management Committee, New Delhi). The DAVCMC nationally holds the record for producing the largest number of CBSE (class X and XII) toppers as a single institution in the last 10 years. It follows the CBSE curriculum. English is the primary medium of instruction, with students also receiving education in Hindi, Sanskrit, and Telugu.

DAV Safilguda is equally renowned for its academics as well as sports. Many students from this school have gone on to secure coveted jobs in the fields of engineering and medicine, among others. DAV Safilguda played host to the CBSE National Judo Championship in November 2017.

== Achievements ==
DAV Safilguda has been awarded the coveted ISA (International School Award) instituted by the British Council to promote internationalism in learning in the year 2013. Mrs.Seetha Kiran, the principal of DAV Safilguda, received the National Award to Teachers in the year 2009 from the then President of India, Pratibha Patil.
