= Sainikpuri =

- Neighbourhood
- Location in Hyderabad, India
- Coordinates: 17.501564°N 78.563047°E
- Country: India
- State: Telangana
- District: Medchal–Malkajgiri district
- City: Hyderabad

Government
  - Body: GHMC

Languages
  - Official: Telugu
- Time zone: UTC+5:30 (IST)
- PIN: Sainikpuri Post
- Lok Sabha constituency: Malkajgiri Lok Sabha constituency
- Vidhan Sabha constituency: Uppal Assembly constituency
- Planning agency: HMDA

Sainikpuri is a residential neighbourhood in the northeastern part of Hyderabad City. It falls under Kapra mandal of Medchal-Malkajgiri District, and is currently administered under GHMC East Zone. It started as a co-operative housing society venture for retired army personnel, but now has houses which belong to other defence services as well as civilians. Late Brig M. K Rao, Late Brig S.N.Docca (former commandant of EME School, now MCEME) and Late Lt. Col. Tiwari Singh were the first few to have got plots in the society and had a vision to develop the colony into an elite area. The housing plots originally allotted to the members of the Sainikpuri co-operative society were of the size of 700–1,000 square yards each. Owing to this reason, most residences have large lawns and gardens. Roads are well laid and numbered. Avenues are lined with a variety of flowering and fruiting trees, and are ideal for morning and evening walks. The sprawling cantonment area, as well as College of Defence Management (CDM) which is a premier establishment of the Indian armed forces, are in the vicinity of Sainikpuri. The old buildings are now slowly giving way to multi-storied apartments, and it is becoming a costlier affair to acquire living space in this area.

== History ==
The area was originally a part of the Neredmet village before becoming Sainikpuri Colony. The name of the place is derived from the original residents who were Sainiks, meaning soldiers, and puri meaning place. Sainikpuri started as a co-operative housing society venture in 1960s for retired army personnel. But now it has houses which belong to other defence services as well as civilians.

== Recreation ==
There is a common auditorium / mess which offers a variety of services for the residents of Sainikpuri. These services include a gymnasium, a basketball court, a badminton court, a library and a community hall. Hanging around the banks of the Kapra Lake is another pastime that the youngsters in the area indulge in. Due to the lake, there is an abundance of ground-water and greenery around. The colony is clean and the temperature is low, which has made it a popular spot for morning and evening walks.

Most serving and retired members of armed forces residing in Sainikpuri are also the members of another club, the R.S.I. Club at Alwal. The R.S.I. Club is strictly for the armed forces personnel, their families and their guests, and strict dress-code and manners are enforced. Movie-screenings and 'Tambola' are held on Saturdays in the R.S.I. Club, Alwal, which also frequently organizes cultural events and welfare activities for the families of the officers.

== Culture ==
Culturally Sainikpuri is Pan-Indian due to its Armed Forces origins, and has been home to people from almost every major culture of India. When Sainikpuri was established, it was removed from the rest of the Hyderabad-Secunderabad axis by at least 10 kilometers. In course of time, it slowly developed a cultural character of its own, that of a conglomerate of upper-middle-class families of diverse ethnic origins.

Amongst the Hindu shrines of Sainikpuri are the Lakshmi Narayana Swamy temple along with Lord Uma Maheshwara formed the important temple complex when it was initially a Dhyana Mandir to allow meditations. Shirdi Saibaba Temple located near Sainikpuri Post-office in Saipuri colony, Vijaya Ganapathi Temple standing on the High Tension Line Road, and Sri Venkateshwara Temple at the Eshwaripuri Colony which stands on the encroached part of the Kapra Lake. There is also the famous Shiva-Vishnu Temple in the vicinity of the Sainikpuri community Hall. It is located amidst scenic surroundings, and is popular among the devout locals. On the northern fringe of Sainikpuri, there is a Christian shrine of Our Lady of Vailankanni. There is also a mosque in the Defence Colony area. The Nalla Pochamma (or Goddess Kali) Temple is in the Ambedkar Nagar area, and was founded, developed and maintained for almost 30 years by a local resident, Shri Maddela Hanumantha Rao. Scores of devotees offer prayers at this shrine, especially on the annual festival known as 'Bonalu'.

It was in the Eshwarpuri Colony near Sainikpuri that the battle scenes in the Telugu movie, "Dana Veera Sura Karna," considered to be a classic among Telugu movies, were filmed. This landscape features in several old Telugu movies. Surroundings of the Shiva Vishnu Temple are popular amongst cinematographers for film-shootings.

== Neighborhoods ==
Sainikpuri initially had four blocks - A, B, C and D. In early 1980s, additional area was added to Sainikpuri and it became the E block. Neredmet-Vayupuri is another residential area established and developed on the same lines along with Sainikpuri. Other residential colonies have come up to the north of Sainikpuri. Madhavpuri, Classic Enclave, Dr. Ambedkar Nagar Colony, Lakshmipuri, Osmania University Teachers Colony (OUT Colony), Saibaba Officers Colony, Bhasker Rao Nagar (especially 40/1), Eshwaripuri colony, H M T Bearings Officer's Colony, Suryanagar Colony, Kalyan Gardens, Mahalakshmipuri (Excise) Colony, Shaili Gardens, Manik Sai Enclave, Tulsi Gardens, Maruthi Gardens, Sylvan Greens, Yapral residential area etc., are a few to name. Defence colony is another well established organized residential area adjoining Sainikpuri, and is as old as Sainikpuri.

There are other well known bars, movie-theatres and shopping complexes of all hues on the Sainikpuri-ECIL Road. So are cyber-cafes, currency exchange centres and other amenities. Super-speciality hospitals such as Paulomi Hospital, Apollo Hospital, Raghavendra Hospital, Tulsi Hospital and Bhavan's Sarada Hospital (maintained by the Bhavan's Trust) can be accessed easily, besides several other clinics and dispensaries, including pet-clinics. There are also a number of path-labs and medical diagnostic centres (Lupin, Medicare etc.) in the area

Most of these neighbourhoods are served by the Sainikpuri Post Office. Until the late 1980s, a police outpost staffed by two constables served Sainikpuri, Vayupuri and the Defence colony, with the main police station at Kushaiguda. Over the time, things have changed, and the Rachakonda Police Commissionerate of the Cyberabad Police presently lies on the Sainikpuri-Neredmet Main Road. The law & order scenario is surprisingly good, thanks to the Sainikpuri's disciplined residents and the regular patrolling by the Cyberabad Police, though isolated incidents of burglaries, drug-pedalling and chain-snatching are reported from the extension areas from time to time. Clement Cheema, a notorious Nigerian drug-peddler with alleged links to several Tollywood actors and actresses, was arrested by the police in 2010 from a Sainikpuri extension area.

The thoroughfare through the roads of cantonment area has been a bone of contention between the residents of Sainikpuri and the cantonment authorities, over which several legal battles were fought and protests were held. For accessing parts of the Sainikpuri area, one has to necessarily pass through the cantonment area which is under the Secunderabad Cantonment Board. Indian Army controls the access. On the other hand, over the years several civilian residential colonies have developed around the Sainikpuri area. Consequently, the vehicular traffic increased. The grievance of the Indian Army is that this was interfering with the training of the soldiers. Therefore, at different times, attempts were to stop the night movement of the civilian traffic or to restrict the same. On the other hand, civilians complain that the access roads are deliberately maintained badly, and that hindrances are being caused in essential movements. Of late, a move has been made by the Indian Army authorities to levy fee from the civilian traffic moving through the cantonment roads, which evoked protests from the civilians.

== Education ==
Bhavan's Sri RamaKrishna Vidyalaya, also known as Bharatiya Vidya Bhavan, Sainikpuri, is on the periphery of Sainikpuri, and many students from Sainikpuri and its extension areas study in this school. The school also has a state of the art cricket training academy, and has produced couple of national level cricketers. Another elite educational institution, Bhavan's Vivekananda College, which is also a part of the Bhavan's group of institutions, is located in close proximity to Sainikpuri, providing high quality graduate and postgraduate level education to students. The Bhavan's Ramakrishna Vidyalaya, initially just Ramakrishna Vidyalaya, a residential school being managed by the Ramakrishna Math along with the Sarada Devi Hospital on the A. S. Rao Nagar Main Road, was later handed over to the Bhavan's group. Some of its founder members were Late Brig. M. K. Rao and Late Lt. Col. Tiwari. Distinguished retired members of the armed forces continue to serve on the board and council of the Bhavan's Sri Ramakrishna Vidyalaya in various capacities.

The Indus International School is another well known, elite educational establishment nearby. The school is known for its excellent sporting facilities including a full-length swimming pool which is open to outsiders on membership basis. Also close are the Kendriya Vidyalaya, Bolarum, the Army Public School, Foster Billabong International, Orchids International School and Shantiniketan International School.

There are also several tutoring centers for students of higher classes often run by the school faculty members and many similar private junior colleges which provide similar education. Apart from this, Sainikpuri is a hub for other extracurricular activities that include classical dance and music, western as well as Indian.

== Book Circulation Library ==
Filiko Books is one of the major book lending libraries in this neighbourhood and boasts 5000+ books catering for all groups. More books are added every month. There are comics, fiction, non-fiction, self-help, travel and so on which can be read at leisure and return. It is also possible to loan a number of popular magazines. The library is open on all days of a week with an exception on Tuesdays.

== Kapra Lake ==
Kapra Lake, or the Kapra Pedda Cheruvu as it was originally recorded in the Revenue Department's records (78° 33' 30", 17° 30' 00") is a restored tank with a recorded spread of 112 acres and 7 Guntas (44.87 hectares). It spreads roughly north–south on the eastern phalanx of Sainikpuri. A decade back this lake was deemed pristine and pollution free. It is however now marked as polluted and susceptible to encroachments by the Greater Hyderabad Municipal Corporation, thanks to the growing industrialization in the vicinity and dumping of garbage from the nearby residential colonies. A part of the Kapra Lake stands encroached for the past few years, and the Greater Hyderabad Municipal Corporation recently listed 25 structures as encroachments of the Karpra Lake liable for demolition, including Sri Venkateshwara Temple. Sill Level (SL) of the sluice of the Kapra Lake stands recorded as +547.873 Meters, Full Tank Level (FTL) as +550.854 Meters, Maximum Water Level (MWL) as +551.614 Meters, and its Tank Bund Level (TBL) as +553.584 Meters. Length of its bund is measured at 1254 Meters. As of now, out of the original 50 FTL pillars fixed by the Greater Hyderabad Municipal Corporation and the Hyderabad Lake Management Circle of the Irrigation Department, 13 pillars stand disturbed and removed by the encroachers. Efforts are underway to re-fix the missing pillars in order to prevent further encroachments. There are two feeder channels, two sluices, and two surplus courses for the Kapra Lake, this lake being part of a chain of water bodies, wherein the surplus course of the upper water body flows down into the lower water body. Thus, the Kapra Lake is intimately linked in the chain to the Banda Cheruvu of Malkajgiri, the Annanarayan Cheruvu of Nagaram, and the Yadi Bai Gunta of Yellareddy Guda. As a part of the citizens' initiative to protect the Kapra Lake, a rudimentary Lake Protection Body has been formed. The SL, FTL, MWL and TBL of the Kapra Lake were measured, and fixed under the ANDHRA PRADESH WATER, LAND AND TREES ACT – 2002 in the year 2005. Attempts were made by some encroachers to get the officially recorded levels altered in the garb of "re-constructing the bund and the sluices" (on the inner side of the existing bund and the sluices, thus shrinking the lake), but were thwarted by the vigilant citizen-activists.
