= Old Neredmet =

- Location in Telangana, India Old Neredmet (Telangana) Old Neredmet (India)
- Coordinates: 17.471694°N 78.536444°E
- Country: India
- State: Telangana
- District: Medchal-Malkajgiri
- Mandal: Malkajgiri
- City: Hyderabad
- Ward, Lakes: Ward No. 136 -Neredmet (Half), Ward No. 137- Vinayak Nagar(Half), Ward No. 140- Malkajgiri (Half) Ramakrishnapuram Munkidigan Cheruvu, Safilgudem Nadimi Cheruvu, Neredmet Banda Cheruvu
- Founded: 1578 AD

Government
  - Body: GHMC, Malkajgiri

Area
  - Total: 8.5 km^{2} (3.3 sq mi)
- Elevation: 1,536 m (5,039 ft)

Population (Census 2009)
  - Total: 127,557
  - Density: 15,000/km^{2} (39,000/sq mi)

Languages
  - Official: Telugu, Urdu
- Time zone: UTC+5:30 (IST)
- Postal code: 500056
- Lok Sabha constituency: Malkajgiri
- Vidhan Sabha constituency: Malkajgiri
- Planning agency: GHMC

Old Neredmet is a neighbourhood of Hyderabad city in the Indian state of Telangana.
