= Safilguda =

Safilguda Safil Gudem
- Locality
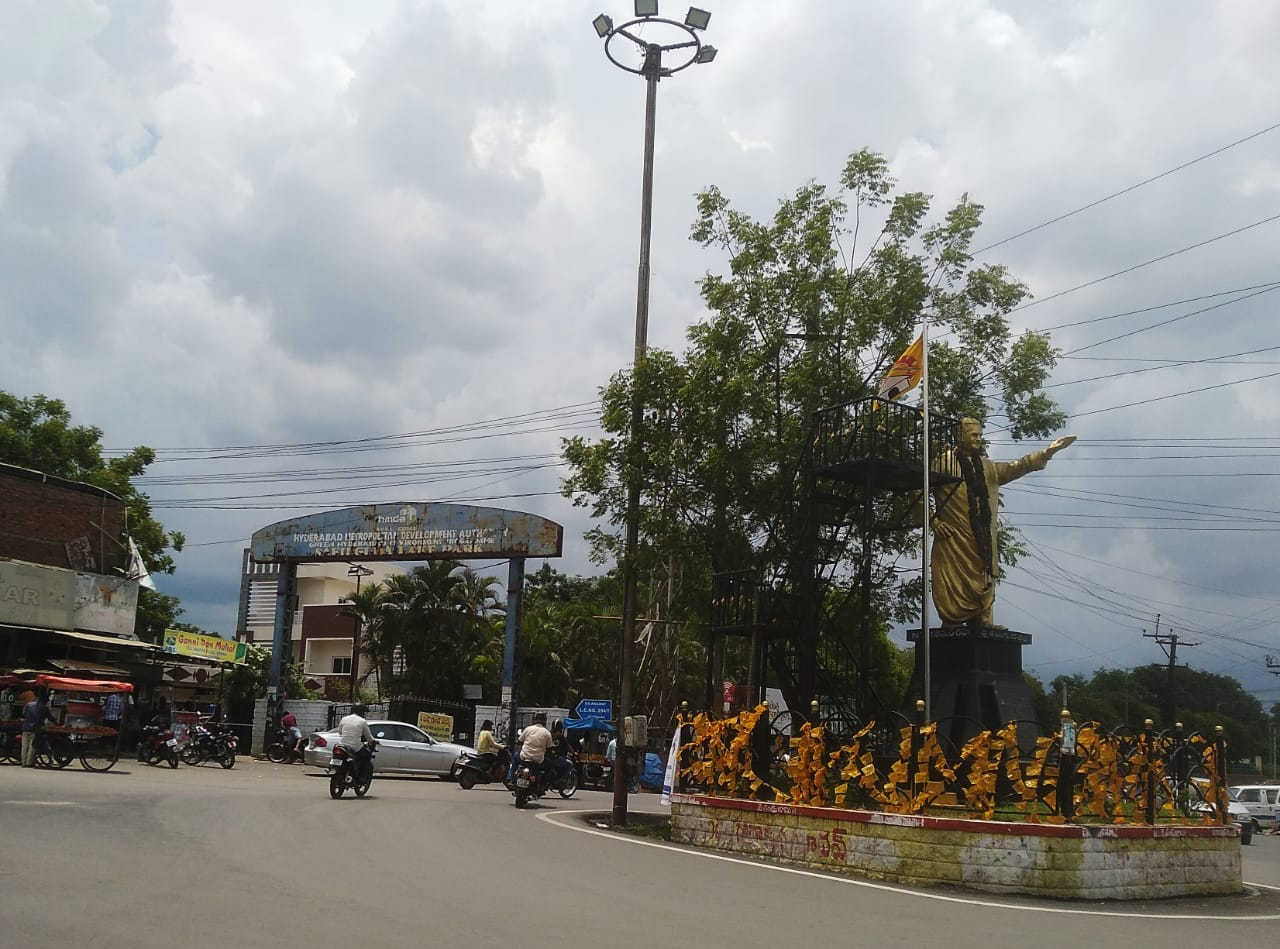
- Safilguda X Roads, Neredmet

- Location in Hyderabad
- Coordinates: 17°27′50″N 78°32′30″E
- Country: India
- State: Telangana
- District: Medchal-Malkajgiri
- City: Hyderabad
- Development Started: 1960

Government
  - Body: GHMC, Malkajgiri Circle

Population (2011)
  - Total: 135,891

Languages
  - Official: Telugu
- Time zone: UTC+5:30 (IST)
- PIN Codes and Postal Areas: Neredmet & RK Puram Post – 500056; Malkajgiri Post – 500047
- Lok Sabha constituency: Malkajgiri
- Vidhan Sabha constituency: Malkajgiri
- Planning agency: GHMC, Malkajgiri Circle

Safilguda, originally named as Safilgudem before the 1970s, is a residential locality in Neredmet neighbourhood of Hyderabad city. It falls under Malkajgiri mandal in Medchal-Malkajgiri district of Indian state of Telangana. It formed Ward No. 137 of Greater Hyderabad Municipal Corporation in 2009.

Popular Safilguda lake or formally Nadimi Cheruvu is located here. The boundary road around the lake is fashioned like the Tank Bund on the Hussain Sagar Lake and hence is also referred to as Safilguda mini tankbund. This is a popular attraction for the locals for jogging and morning and evening walks.

== History ==
The early settlers of Safilgudem, who arrived in the 1960s/1970s, had a very tough time since this area was isolated with no means of transport to reach the city and no electricity. Gudem means "hamlet" or "village". In the 1970s people had to bicycle around 6 km to reach the city unless they were able to get the occasional bus. There were only two or three houses and barren land and rocks were everywhere. Land cost around ₹5 per sq ft. Earlier it was a hamlet called Safilgudem and then it became a small town in Old Neredmet Village.

=== Subregions of Safilguda ===
Safilguda is divided into two major regions. Old Safilguda and Safilguda (New).

== Old Safilguda ==
The old hamlet (Safilgudem) of Neredmet village is now known as Old Safilguda.

=== Colonies in Old Safilguda ===
- Santoshima Nagar Colony
- Old Safilguda
- Bharath Nagar
- Ganesh Nagar
- Lakshmi Nagar
- Creative Nagar
- PB Colony
- PB Surya Nagar
- Safi nagar
- Dwarkamayi Colony
- Sudha Nagar
- Sainathpuram
- Pragathi Nagar
- Venkateshwara Nagar Colony
- Mahadevi colony

== Safilguda (New) ==
This area is in between Safilguda X road – Safilguda Railway station – Safilguda Pocket Complex(Defence Quarters) – Safilguda AOC – RK Nagar – Uttam Nagar – Balram Nagar - Chanakyapuri Region is known as (New) Safilguda. Earlier (1970's) called as Station Safilguda because Railway station was near by that area.

Safilguda is well connected with roads and railways. Located around 8 km from Secunderabad railway station and 4 km from Jubilee bus station.

=== Colonies in Safilguda (New) ===
- Sharda Nagar
- Surya Nagar Enclave
- Chanakyapuri Colony
- RK Nagar
- Uttam Nagar
- Dayanand Nagar
- Chandragiri Colony
- Shiva Gowri Enclave
- Balram Nagar
- Seetharam Nagar
- West Sri Krishna Nagar Colony

Radha Krishna Nagar is specifically a colony that took shape in the 1970s and is one of the well laid-out colonies out there. Uttam Nagar, Dayanand Nagar and Chanakyapuri have also been around since the 1970s.

These colonies became popular and a place of choice for Railway employees who purchased plots during the 1970s and constructed houses in the colonies.

A significant portion of descendents of railway employees now reside in this part of city, their children working or settled abroad. Safilguda is home to a diverse and sizable population, including local residents and communities from Andhra Pradesh and people from Kerala.

== Commercial area ==
There are many shops in the area catering to all needs of the people. Outlets of major retail chains such as Reliance, Fresh @, More. and others are available here.

All the amenities of a suburban town — medical, educational, shopping, offices, public transportation — are available. There are medical shops and hospitals that function round the clock. Educational institutions of the D.A.V group, Bharatiya Vidya Bhavan are prominent and within close proximity. Some colleges also function here like the Sri Chaitanya Malkajgiri branch, Narayana College, Malkajgiri branch etc.

== Transport ==
Buses are run by TSRTC connecting it to all major parts of the city making them the most preferred mode of transportation here.

=== Transportation ===
Road transportation

Anandbagh X roads connects to various parts of the city. The public transport at this location provides connections to Uttam nagar, Mettuguda, ECIL, MaulaAli, Tarnaka and more.

Railway transportation

- Safilguda Railway station

It is the rail route between Secunderabad junction to Bollaram junction

Anandbagh crossroads facilitates connections to various parts of the city. The public transport at this location provides connections to Uttam Nagar, Alwal, ECIL, MaulaAli and more. Additionally, this junction also hosts Farmers market every Wednesday. The landmark is also famous for Venkateshwara Temple. Suburban trains plying between Medchal, Bolarum to Secunderabad pass via Safilguda Railway Station but they always run late. On one side of the station is military cantonment area and the other side is civilian area coming under Ranga Reddy district.

There is a golf course next to Safilguda, but entry is restricted to military personnel only (Now there is no Golf course but the entire open area has been fenced up by military). The whole cantonment area provides a great relief to the joggers and walkers.

Safilguda is one of the most densely populated Middle/Upper class localities in the City today. While independent houses are more in this locality, many number of flats have also come up in and around Safilguda. However, one cannot say much about the design, look or aesthetics of the flats as most of them just present a boxy look.
