= Neredmet Moodu Gullu =

Religion
- Affiliation: Hinduism
- District: Medchal-Malkajgiri
- Deity: Nallapochamma, Mahankali, Muthyallamma

Location
- Location: Dinakar Nagar Old Neredmet, Secunderabad
- State: Telangana
- Country: India
- Interactive map of Neredmet Moodu Gullu
- Coordinates: 17°28′17″N 78°32′21″E

Architecture
- Elevation: 510 m (1,673 ft)

Sri Nallapochamma, Sri Muthyalamma, Sri Mahakali Devasthanam, also known as Moodu Gullu Temple, is a group of three temples in the Old Neredmet neighbourhood of Hyderabad in the Indian State of Telangana. It is 120 years old temple. Devotees offer prayers to the goddess every day. In particular, Thousands of devotees offer prayers during Ashada Jathara, which usually falls on Sundays.
