= Ramakrishnapuram =

R K Puram Ramakistapuram
- Ramakrishnapuram, Neredmet
- Country: India
- State: Telangana
- District: Medchal–Malkajgiri
- City: Secunderabad

Government
  - Body: GHMC Malkajgiri Circle

Area
  - Total: 2.5 km^{2} (0.97 sq mi)

Languages
- Time zone: UTC+5:30 (IST)
- Ramakrishna Puram: 500056
- Vehicle registration: TG-08
- Lok Sabha constituency: Malkajgiri
- Vidhan Sabha constituency: Malkajgiri

Ramakrishnapuram (or RK Puram ) is a locality in Neredmet in Medchal-Malkajgiri district of Indian State of Telangana. It falls under Malkajgiri mandal. In the past 15 years, this suburb has become an important residential area in the twin cities. Many colonies, townships and apartments came up in this suburb.

== History ==
RK Puram lake's roots can be traced back to 1798 when the 'subsidiary alliance' was proposed by then British Governor-General in India, Lord Wellesley.

By the early 1800s, the Electronics and Mechanical Engineering (EME), which is presently the Military College of Electronics and Mechanical Engineering (MCEME), had been set up at Trimulgherry. The engineers and electricians who worked here needed water, So RK Puram Lake was commissioned by the Nizam and dug up in the mid-1800s, occupying a space of around 100 acres.

== Localities in RK Puram ==
Listed below are some popular and developed colonies in R K Puram also known as Ramakrishnapuram.

- RK Puram (Ramakrishnapuram Hamlet) Village,
- Sapthagiri Colony,
- Bharani Colony,
- Chandra Babu Naidu Colony,
- Raghavendra Nagar,
- Matrupuri Colony,
- GK Colony,
- Brundavan Colony,
- Prem Nagar,
- Ananthaiah Colony,
- Santhosh Colony,
- Balaji Colony,
- Sri Venkateshwara Officers Colony,
- Asha Officers Colony,
- Shakthi Nagar,
- Gandhi Nagar,
- Anantha Saraswathi Colony,
- Brindavan Colony.
- Balaji Nagar.

== Services ==
=== Schools ===
- Army Public School RK puram
- Little Diamond High School, RK.Puram

== Lakes and Water Parks ==
- Ramakrishnapuram Mukidigan Cheruvu

== Transport ==
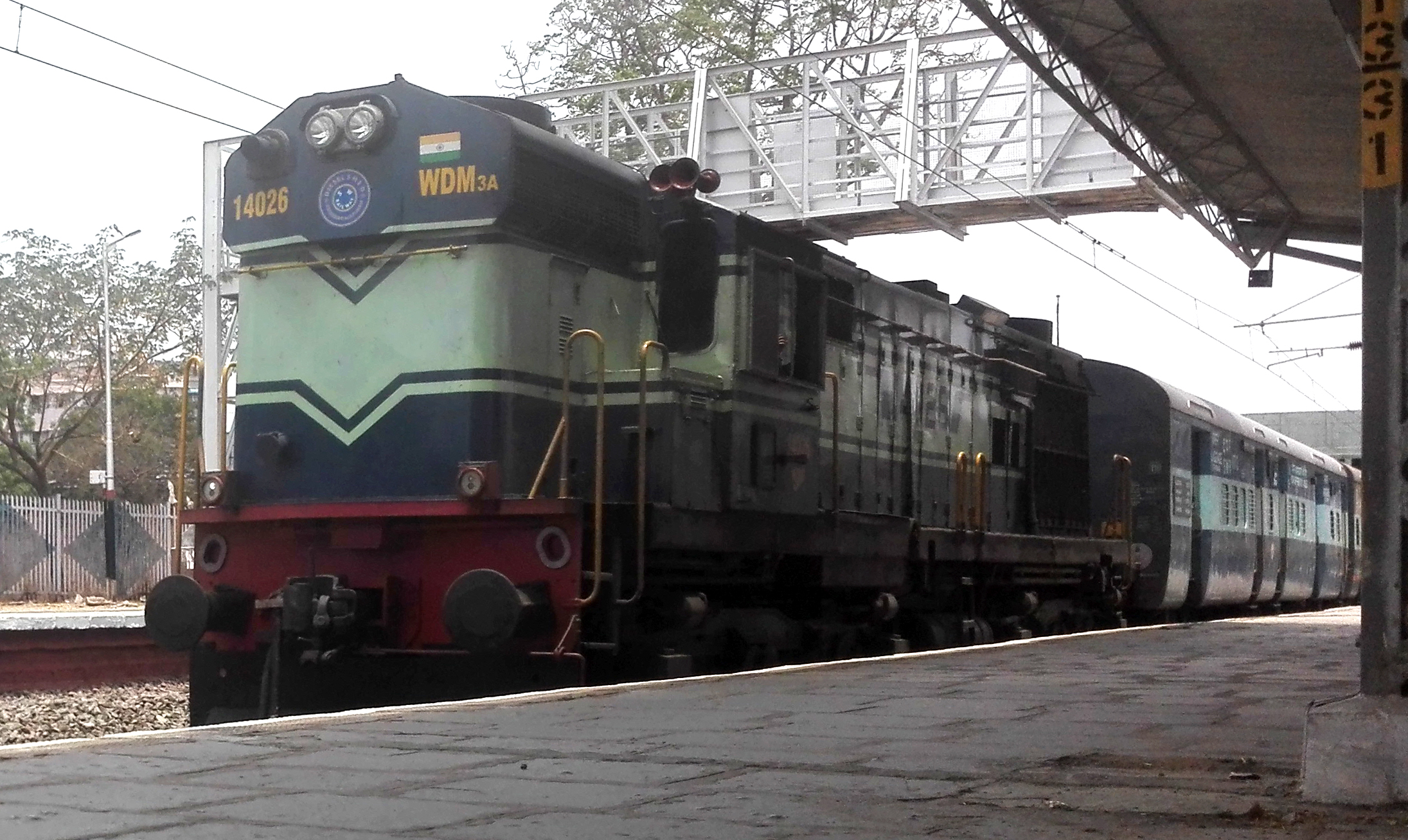
Kaacheguda Yesvanthpur Express at Ramakistapuram Gate Railway Station.

=== Bus Stops ===
R K Puram is well connected by TSRTC city bus services with Secunderabad. Tirumalagiri and ECIL X Roads, by RK Puram Bus Stop and R K Puram Rythu Bazar Bus Stop.

=== Railways ===
It is connected by suburban rail system, by Ramakistapuram Gate Railway Station.

=== Metro ===
Nearest Hyderabad Metro station is Parade Grounds Metro Station.
