= Ramakistapuram Gate railway station =

Railway station in Hyderabad, India

Coordinates: 17.4765°N 78.5290°E

Ramakistapuram Gate
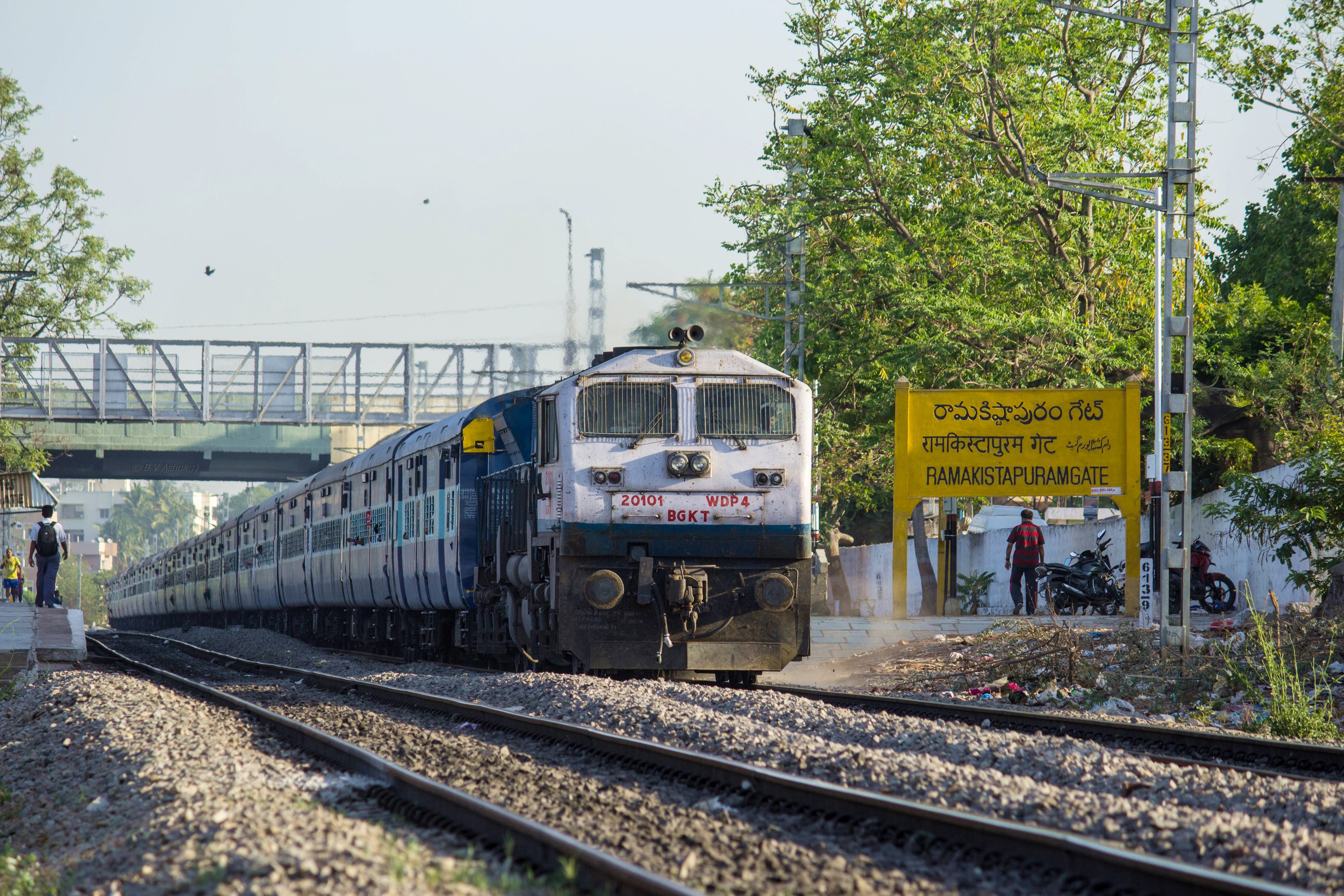

General information
- Location: Ramakrishnapuram, Neredmet, Secunderabad, Telangana; India
- Elevation: 535.60 metres (1,757.2 ft)
- System: Indian Railways and Hyderabad MMTS station
- Owner: Indian Railways
- Operator: South Central Railway zone
- Line: Secunderabad–Bolarum route
- Platforms: 2
- Tracks: 2

Construction
- Structure type: Standard (on-ground station)

Other information
- Status: Functioning
- Station code: RKO
- Zone(s): South Central Railway zone
- Division(s): Hyderabad

History
- Former names: Nizam's Guaranteed State Railway
Location

Ramakistapuram Gate railway station (station code: RKO) is a railway station in Hyderabad, Telangana, India near Ramakrishnapuram Lake, Neredmet, from which localities like R K Puram, Trimulgherry, Sainikpuri, AS Rao Nagar and Kapra are accessible.

Ramakistapuram is the anglicised name for Ramakrishnapuram.

== R K Puram Bridge ==
Flyover over the railway line at RK Puram was constructed by the GHMC. Areas at the eastern end of the flyover are under GHMC jurisdiction, while those on its western end are under the jurisdiction of the Secunderabad Cantonment Board (SCB) and the Local Military Authority.

Greater Hyderabad Municipal Corporation (GHMC) has proposed to construct a two-lane railway overbridge (ROB) parallel to the existing ROB at the RK Puram railway gate.

== Lines ==
- Hyderabad Multi-Modal Transport System
  - Secunderabad–Bolarum route (BS Line)
