= Gaddi Annaram =

- city
- Location in Telangana, India Gaddi Annaram (India)
- Coordinates: 17.3653°N 78.5992°E
- Country: India
- State: Telangana
- District: Ranga Reddy
- City: Hyderabad
- Elevation: 481 m (1,578 ft)

Population (2001)
  - Total: 53,622

Languages
  - Official: Telugu
- Time zone: UTC+5:30 (IST)
- Vehicle registration: TS
- Website: telangana.gov.in

Gaddi Annaram is a Municipality in Ranga Reddy district located in the city of Hyderabad in the state of Telangana in India.

== Geography ==
Gaddi Annaram is located at 17.3653°N 78.5992°E. It has an average elevation of 481 meters (1581 feet).

== Demographics ==
As of 2001 India census, Gaddi annaram had a population of 53,622. Males constitute 52% of the population and females 48%. Gaddi annaram has an average literacy rate of 81%, higher than the national average of 59.5%: male literacy is 85%, and female literacy is 76%. In Gaddi annaram, 11% of the population is under 6 years of age.
