= Safilguda Lake =

- Nadimi cheruvu
- Location within Telangana
- Location: Old Neredmet, Hyderabad, Telangana, India
- Coordinates: 17.46372°N 78.53626°E
- Type: natural lake
- Primary inflows: Ramakrishnapuram Lake
- Primary outflows: Neredmet Banda Cheruvu
- Basin countries: India
- Surface elevation: 1,759 ft (536 m)
- Islands: Nadimi bird island
- Settlements: Neredmet

Safilguda lake, originally named as Nadimi Cheruvu (Original Name) and Mini Tank Bund, is a lake located in Safilguda Hamlet, Neredmet Village, Secunderabad, Telangana, India. There is a park adjacent to the lake called Safilguda Lake Park. The lake has a small island called Nadimi Bird Island. It is covered with thick trees, which attract a variety of wildlife, especially migratory birds. Katta Misamma Temple is located on the shoreline of the lake. The road around the lake is similar to the Necklace Road around the "tank bund" on the Hussain Sagar Lake and hence the lake is also called "Mini Tank Bund". The park is a popular attraction for jogging and evening walks. Several movies have been shot at this lake. "Elluvochi Godaramma" song shot at Safilguda lake is a very popular song.

== History ==
The Hyderabad Urban Development Authority restored the lake in 2000 under the Conservation and Restoration Project of Green Hyderabad Environment Programme. It became a popular recreation area for the residents of nearby colonies. Several years later, lake became polluted due to lack of maintenance and negligence of the Hyderabad Metropolitan Development Authority and the Greater Hyderabad Municipal Corporation.

== See also ==
- Ramakrishnapuram Lake
