= Malkajgiri mandal =

Malkajgiri mandal Mallikarjunagiri
- Urban Mandal
- Location in the state of Telangana, India Malkajgiri mandal (Telangana) Malkajgiri mandal (India)
- Coordinates: 17°26′54″N 78°31′45″E
- Country: India
- State: Telangana
- District: Medchal-Malkajgiri
- Founded: 1578

Government
  - Body: GHMC

Area
  - Total: 35.8 km^{2} (13.8 sq mi)
- Elevation: 4,050 m (13,290 ft)

Population (2001)
  - Total: 413,571
  - Density: 11,600/km^{2} (29,900/sq mi)

Languages
  - Official: Telugu, Urdu
- Time zone: UTC+5:30 (IST)
- PIN Codes Postal Area and Head Office: 500047, 500040, 500056, 500062, 500094 Head Post Office : Tirumalgiri
- Vehicle registration: TG-08
- Lok Sabha constituency: Malkajgiri
- Vidhan Sabha constituency: Malkajgiri
- Planning agency: GHMC

Malkajgiri mandal is one of the 15 mandals in Medchal–Malkajgiri district of the Indian state of Telangana. It is under the administration of Malkajgiri revenue division with its headquarters at Malkajgiri. The mandal is bounded by Alwal, Kapra, Uppal mandals and Hyderabad district. Malkajgiri and also Municipality till 2007, which is a suburb in (Erstwhile) Hyderabad city, now it is a circle in Greater Hyderabad Municipal Corporation.

== Demographics ==
As of the 2001 India census. Malkajgiri had a population of 413,571. The population is 51% male and 49% female. Malkajgiri has an average literacy ratio of 87% with 321,525 total people literated. In terms of literacy, Malkajgiri ranks at 1st in K.V.Rangareddy district, higher than the national average of 59.5%; male literacy is 72%, and female literacy is 65%. In Malkajgiri, 7% of the population is under 6 years of age.

== Villages in Malkajgiri mandal ==
Malkajgiri is a Mandal in Ranga Reddy (Eastrwile) district of Telangana state in India. Below is the list of Towns and Villages in Malkajgiri Mandal. Total Number of villages in this Mandal list are 12.

- Alwal (Municipality)
- Ammuguda
- Kowkur
- Lothkunta
- Macha Bolaram
- Malkajgiri (Municipality)
- Yapral

Later in 2017 some villages merged in Alwal and formed Alwal Mandal by burificating Malkajgiri Mandal .

At Present now Malkajgiri Mandal has following neighbourhoods erstwhile Villages:

- Malkajgiri Village (Including Talla Basthi, Mirzalguda & Hanumanpet Hamlet Villages)
- Moula Ali Village
- Neredmet Village (Including Ramakrishnapuram Hamlet village, Safilguda Hamlet Village) .
- Ammuguda Village

Kapargutta

== GHMC wards in Malkajgiri mandal ==
- 136 Neredmet division
- 137 Vinayak nagar division
- 138 Moula Ali division
- 139 East anandbagh division
- 140 Malkajgiri division
- 141 Goutham Nagar division
