= Ramakrishnapuram Lake =

Lake in Hyderabad, India

- ముకిడిగన్ చెరువు (రామకృష్ణాపురం చెరువు)
- ముకిడిగాన్ చెరువు (Telugu)
- Location within Telangana
- Location: Ramakrishnapuram Hamlet, Neredmet Village, Hyderabad, India
- Coordinates: 17.476°N 78.533°E
- Type: Artificial Lake
- Primary outflows: Safilguda Lake
- Basin countries: India
- Max. length: 1,092 metres (3,583 ft)
- Max. width: 664 metres (2,178 ft)
- Surface area: 100 acres (40 ha), now 50 acres (20 ha)
- Max. depth: 36 feet (11 m)
- Shore length^{1}: 764 metres (2,507 ft)
- Surface elevation: 1,759 ft (536 m)
- Settlements: Neredmet
- ^{1} Shore length is not a well-defined measure.

Ramakrishnapuram Lake, originally named as Mukidigan Cheruvu, is a lake located in Ramakrishnapuram Hamlet, Neredmet Village, Hyderabad near Ramakistapuram Gate Railway Station. It is home to many migratory birds. The lake is currently facing many problems, including water pollution. GHMC is trying to stop pollution but the efforts are not effective. Migratory birds and other animals are also affected by the pollution.

== History ==
RK Puram lake's also Known as Mukidigan Cheruvu (Original Name) roots can be traced back to 1798 when the 'subsidiary alliance' was proposed by then British Governor-General in India, Lord Wellesley.

By the early 1800s, the Electronics and Mechanical Engineering (EME), which is presently the Military College of Electronics and Mechanical Engineering (MCEME), had been set up at Trimulgherry. The engineers and electricians who worked here needed water, So RK Puram Lake was commissioned by the Nizam and dug up in the mid-1800s, occupying a space of around 100 acres.

There is no established date for when the RK Puram lake was dug up, but its roots can be traced back to 1798 when the 'subsidiary alliance' was proposed by then British Governor-General in India, Lord Wellesley.

As part of the alliance, the East India Company offered protection to the rulers of princely states, in exchange for money or land.

Nizam Sikander Jah, the third ruler from the Asaf Jahi dynasty, was said to be one of the first princely states to sign the pact.

At this time, Secunderabad was a small taluk, described as a low flat ridge, near a village north of the Hussain Sagar Lake. It was here that the British built the cantonment area.

Speaking to TNM, Murali Chemuturi, a writer and long-time resident of the area, narrates, “Mudfort, which is now just the name of an area, was the first place where the East India Company built its garrison. Over time, the garrison expanded, and soon it had spread all the way up to Bolaram.”

By the early 1800s, the Electronics and Mechanical Engineering (EME), which is presently the Military College of Electronics and Mechanical Engineering (MCEME), had been set up.

Though it is now a populated area in the city, this was the time that people first settled in then Neredmet village.

“The engineers and electricians who worked there needed two main services. First, they had dry toilets and needed someone for manual scavenging, and secondly, they needed milk and food. For the first, they hired some Scheduled Caste people from Tamil Nadu and for the second purpose, they hired Yadavs (a cattle-breeding caste), from Uttar Pradesh,” Murali says.

“The two groups were housed nearby, and while Neredmet became the village RK Puram was the hamlet where the SC persons stayed,” he adds.

All three of these groups needed water, so the RK Puram Lake was commissioned by the Nizam and dug up in the mid-1800s, occupying a space of around 100 acres.

After the sepoy mutiny in 1857, the British continued to expand aggressively, and the area's population began to grow.

The lake remained a major source of drinking water and largely clean, until the late 1960s, when the Electronics Corporation of India Limited (ECIL) was established.

“There was no shortage of water, which is why the old houses in RK Puram have no well or borewell. In 1965, Sainik Nagar was the first colony to be allotted. Despite this, the lake remained clean, as the colony remained downstream of the lake,” says Murali.

“After ECIL came up, the politicians of the time laid a road right through the lake, to create a shortcut. In 1976, the lake flooded the road, following which it was raised by 5 feet by the gram panchayat with the help of mud and stones,” he adds.

According to locals, this was when a large portion of the lake was killed, as the water that was cut off from the rest of the lake, was eventually dumped with debris and flattened.

“However, it was only in the mid-80s that things started going downhill, as several colonies like GK Colony, Sri Colony, Bank Colony and Bhagat Singh Nagar were built upstream, and untreated sewage started flowing directly into the lake,” Murali says.
