= Neredmet =

- Neighbourhood
- Location in Telangana, India Neredmet (Telangana) Neredmet (India)
- Coordinates: 17.470612°N 78.536186°E
- Country: India
- State: Telangana
- District: Medchal-Malkajgiri
- City: Hyderabad
- Founded: 1578

Government
  - Body: GHMC Malkjgiri Circle
- Elevation: 540 m (1,770 ft)

Population (Census 2011)
  - Total: 127,557

Languages
  - Official: Telugu, Urdu
- Time zone: UTC+5:30 (IST)
- PIN Codes & Post office: 500056- Ramakrishnapuram, 500056-Neredmet, 500094 -Vayupuri, Sainikpuri Slums, Defence Colony, 500062-Gokul Nagar, Parvathi Nagar.
- Vehicle registration: TG-08
- Lok Sabha constituency: Malkajgiri
- Vidhan Sabha constituency: Malkajgiri
- Civic agency: GHMC
- Planning agency: HMDA

Neredmet is a residential neighbourhood in Hyderabad, Telangana, India. It falls under Malkajgiri mandal & Circle in Medchal-Malkajgiri district. Neredmet currently serves as the headquarters of Rachakonda Police commissionerate, one of the three police commissionerates of Hyderabad City. It was earlier a part of Malkajgiri Municipality, but now it is administered under Malkajgiri Circle of GHMC-Secunderabad Zone. It forms Ward No. 136- Neredmet (Fully), Ward No. 137- Vinayak Nagar(Fully), Ward No. 138- Moula-Ali(Half), Ward No. 139- East Anandbagh(Partially), Ward No. 140- Malkajgiri (Half), of Greater Hyderabad Municipal Corporation.

By the early 1800s, the Electronics and Mechanical Engineering (EME), which is presently the Military College of Electronics and Mechanical Engineering (MCEME), had been set up at Trimulgherry. The engineers and electricians who worked here needed water, So RK Puram Lake was commissioned by the Nizam and dug up in the mid-1800s, occupying a space of around 100 acres.

== Sub Regions of Neredmet ==
- Ramakrishnapuram
- New Neredmet
- Kakatiya Nagar
- Old Neredmet
- Vinayak Nagar
- Old Safilguda
- New Safilguda

== Services, schools and religious places ==
=== Schools ===
- Bhavan's Vivekananda College
- DAV Safilguda

== Lakes and water parks ==
- Ramakrishnapuram Lake was made in 1798.
- Safilguda Mini Tankband
