= Greater Hyderabad Municipal Corporation =

City governing body in India

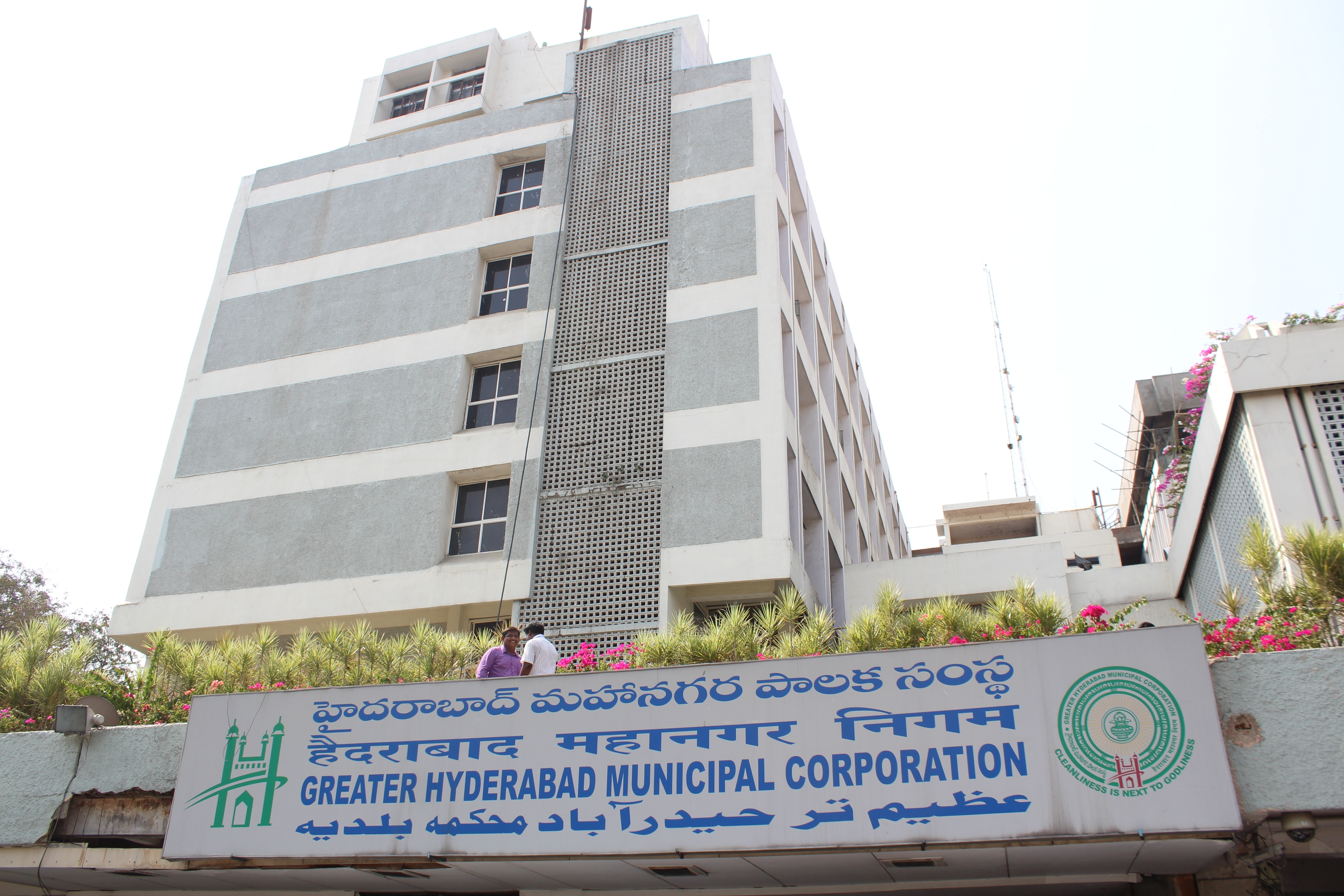

- Emblem of the Greater Hyderabad Municipal Corporation

Type
- Type: Municipal corporation of Hyderabad

History
- Founded: 1869 (157 years ago),
- Preceded by: Municipal Corporation of Hyderabad (2007)
- Succeeded by: Greater Hyderabad Municipal Corporation; Cyberabad Municipal Corporation and; Malkajgiri Municipal Corporation under CURE Apex Governance Council (2026)

Leadership
- Municipal commissioner: R. V. Karnan, IAS

Structure
- Seats: 150
- Political groups: BJP (43); BRS (43); AIMIM (41); INC (23)

Elections
- Last election: 1 December 2020
- Next election: TBD (To be decided)

Motto
- On Mission Tomorrow

Meeting place
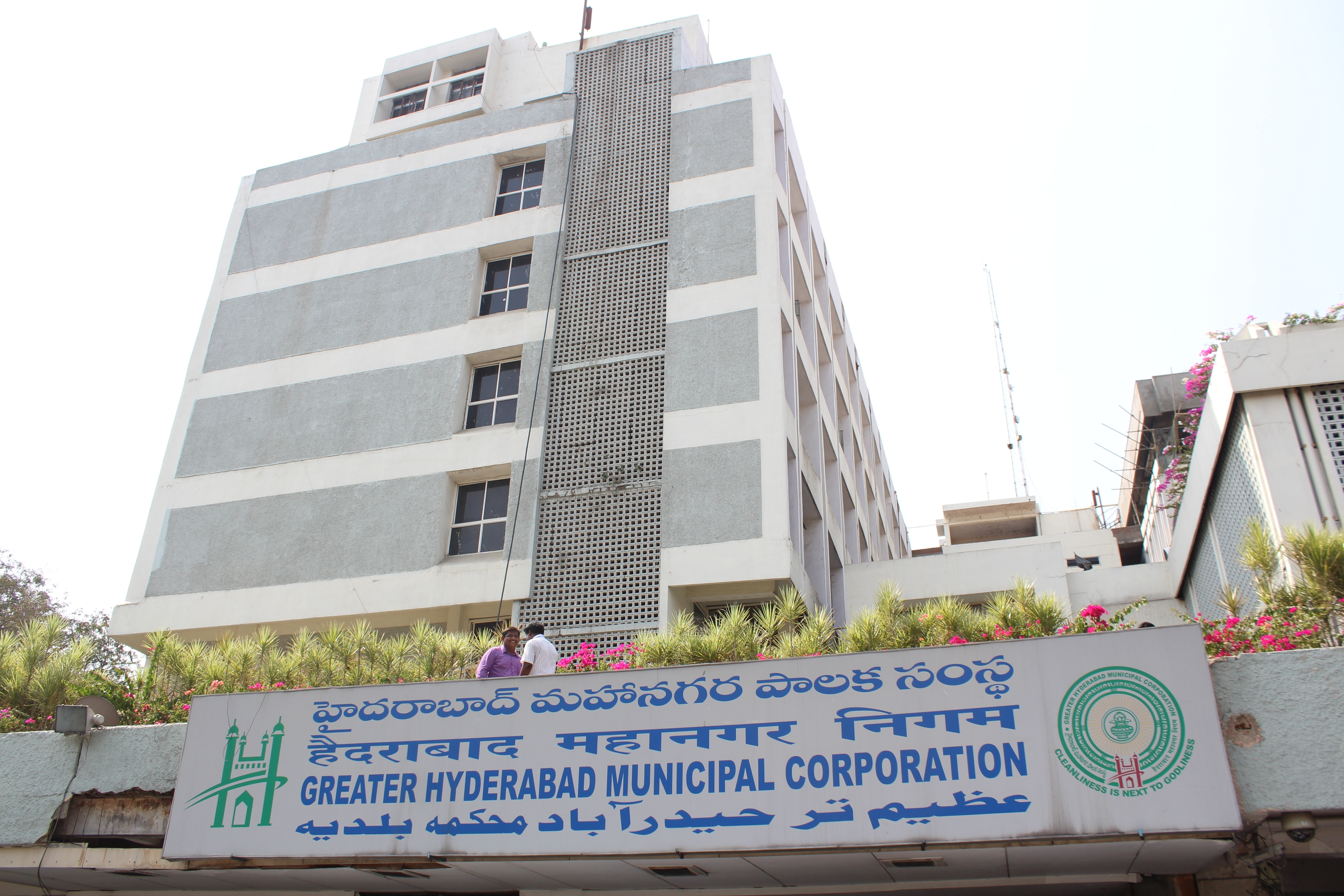
- GHMC Building

Website
- www.ghmc.gov.in

The Greater Hyderabad Municipal Corporation (GHMC) is the civic body that oversees the central and few parts of southern areas of Hyderabad, Telangana. It is the local government for the city of Hyderabad. The GHMC is responsible for civic administration, including urban planning, sanitation, road maintenance, and public health services. It was the largest municipal corporations in India with an area of 2,053 square kilometres (793 sq mi) until 11 February 2026, when GHMC was split into three independent municipal corporations.

== History ==
=== Hyderabad Municipal Board (1869–1933) ===
In 1869, municipal administration was first introduced for the city of Hyderabad. The city of Hyderabad was divided into four and the suburbs of Chaderghat were divided into five divisions. The whole management of both the city and the suburbs was handled by the then City Police Commissioner, Kotwal-e-Baldia.

=== Municipal Corporation of Hyderabad (1933–2007) ===
In 1933, Chaderghat Municipality was merged with Hyderabad Municipality to form Hyderabad Municipal Corporation and was given statutory status under the Hyderabad Municipal Act. During the following year (1934), the first elections were held for Municipal Corporation and a Standing Committee was appointed at that time.

In 1937, Jubilee Hills Municipality was formed by the amalgamation of Jubilee Hills and Banjara Hills. Later, in 1942, the corporation status for the city was removed. In the year 1945, Secunderabad Municipality was formed. Again in 1950, Hyderabad regained its lost Corporation status along with the amalgamation of Jubilee Hills Municipality.

The Hyderabad Corporation and the Secunderabad Corporation, were established in 1950 via the Hyderabad Corporation Act. Jubilee Hills Municipality merged in Hyderabad Corporation during this time. In 1955, the Hyderabad Municipal Corporation Act merged the municipal corporations overseeing Hyderabad and neighbouring Secunderabad.

Once again in 1955, both the municipal corporations of Hyderabad and Secunderabad were merged to form Municipal Corporation of Hyderabad (MCH). In 1956, Hyderabad became capital of Andhra Pradesh after the state was formed.

=== Greater Hyderabad Municipal Corporation (2007–2025) ===
The Greater Hyderabad Municipal Corporation was formed on 16 April 2007 by merging 12 municipalities and 8 gram panchayats with the Municipal Corporation of Hyderabad. The municipalities are L. B. Nagar, Gaddi Annaram, Uppal Kalan, Malkajgiri, Kapra, Alwal, Quthbullapur, Kukatpally, Serilingampally, Rajendranagar, Ramachandrapuram, and Patancheru. These municipalities are in Rangareddy district and Medak district. The panchayats are Shamshabad, Satamarai, Jallapalli, Mamdipalli, Mankhal, Almasguda, Sardanagar and Ravirala.

The Government Order 261 was initially issued in July 2005. Now, the Supreme Court has rejected the plea to interfere into the matter, the Andhra Pradesh government has passed the GO 261 that is related to the creation of Greater Hyderabad on 16 April 2007. Earlier, the twin cities of Hyderabad and Secunderabad had a population of 4.5 million living in an area of 172 square kilometres (66 sq mi). The new urban agglomeration sprawls across 625 km^{2} (241 sq mi) with a population of 6.7 million. The erstwhile city of the Nizams has now transformed into an area far greater.

The Greater Hyderabad Municipal Corporation (GHMC) comprises the limits of the erstwhile Municipal Corporation of Hyderabad (MCH) along with 10 municipalities and 8 panchayats in erstwhile Ranga Reddy district and 2 municipalities in erstwhile Medak district. Secunderabad cantonment does not come under purview of GHMC. There are eight civilian wards in Secunderabad Cantonment Board, with a population of 400,000.

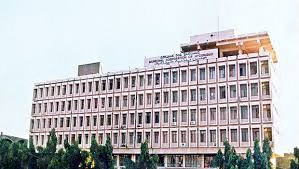
GHMC Head Office

The Government has decided to divide the Greater Hyderabad Municipal Corporation into six zones in 2019 (south, east, north, north east, west and central zones), 30 circles and 150 wards. Old City has about 50 wards in seven circles. Each ward would cover about 40,000–50,000 people. The GHMC is headed by a Commissioner and also has a Special Commissioner both of whom belong to IAS. Each zone will have a zonal commissioner, an officer of the rank of additional commissioner with a deputy municipal commissioners heading every circle. There will also be a separate engineering wing with an Engineer in Chief and Chief Engineer at head office level and a superintending engineer for each zone; a town planning wing with Additional Commissioner (Planning) and a Chief City Planner at the head office level and a city planner for each zone.

In February 2018, the Greater Hyderabad Municipal Corporation (GHMC) has listed its municipal bonds on the Bombay Stock Exchange (BSE). The civic body became the second to list its bonds on the BSE's newly launched bond platform.

=== Greater Hyderabad Municipal Corporation (2025–2026) ===
In November 2025, it was announced that the 27 adjoining urban local bodies (7 municipal corporations: Badangpet, Bandlaguda Jagir, Meerpet–Jillelguda, Boduppal, Peerzadiguda, Jawaharnagar, Nizampet and 20 municipalities: Pedda Amberpet, Jalpally, Shamshabad, Turkayamjal, Manikonda, Narsingi, Adibatla, Tukkuguda, Medchal, Dammaiguda, Nagaram, Pocharam, Ghatkesar, Gundlapochampalli, Thumkunta, Kompally, Dundigal, Bolarum, Tellapur, Ameenpur) will be merged into GHMC. On 3 December 2025, the government order was issued stating that merger came into effect from 2 December 2025. The number of wards were increased to 300.

=== GHMC split (2026–present) ===
On 11 February 2026, the Greater Hyderabad Municipal Corporation (GHMC) was divided into three corporations: GHMC, CMC and MMC. Following the end of the local body term on 9 February 2026, the Government of Telangana appointed special commissioners until the next local body elections are held. All the three corporations are governed by the Core Urban Region (Integrated Governance) Act, 2026. The reorganised GHMC covers approximately 689 km^{2} (266 sq mi).

== Administration ==
The Greater Hyderabad Municipal Corporation is headed by a Municipal Commissioner, an IAS officer. The commissioner wields the executive power of the house. A quinquennial election is held to elect corporators to power. The corporators are responsible for overseeing that their constituencies have the basic civic infrastructure in place, and that there is no lacuna on the part of the authorities.

=== Executive ===
The Andhra Pradesh Government appointed CVSK Sarma as the first Chief Commissioner of GHMC in 2007. There is also a provision for a directly elected mayor of Hyderabad. However, the Chief Commissioner can allocate more funds and in general has more power.

=== Legislature ===
The term of the legislature of precursor to the GHMC namely the Municipal Corporation of Hyderabad, then simply called by the same name ended before the formation of the GHMC. The Standing Committee of the Legislature takes a major role in the decision-making process within the legislature when it is in session. 64 ex-officio members including 5 Lok Sabha MPs whose constituencies are in GHMC jurisdiction vote in GHMC election.

The Mayor is the head of the house. They function through four organs namely Council, Mayor, standing Committees and commissioner. The council, which consists of the registered voters of the corporation, is a deliberative body.

== Administrative divisions of GHMC ==
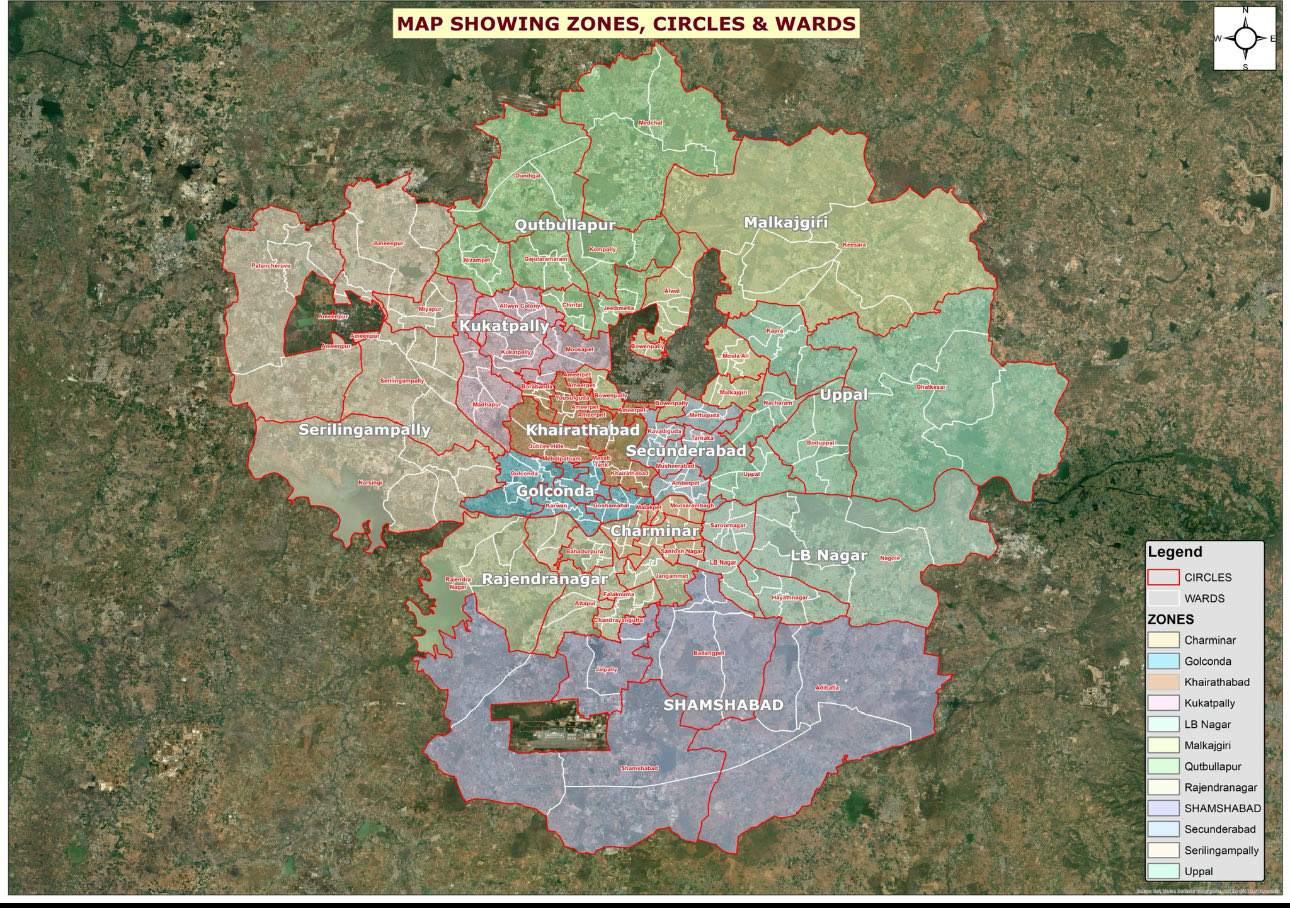
The new GHMC is divided into 12 municipal zones

The Greater Hyderabad Municipal Corporation (GHMC) is the civic body that oversees Hyderabad, the capital and largest city in the Indian state of Telangana. It is the local government for the cities of Hyderabad and Secunderabad. Its geographical area covers most of the urban development agency the Hyderabad Metropolitan Development Authority (HMDA). 24 Assembly constituencies comes under GHMC. 64 ex-officio members including 5 Lok Sabha MPs whose constituencies are in GHMC jurisdiction vote in GHMC election.

== Elections ==
=== 2020 GHMC election ===
After 2016, third GHMC elections were held in December 2020. The GHMC council's term will end on Feb 11, 2026.

S.No.	Party Name	Symbol	Won	Change
1	Bharat Rashtra Samithi		56	▼43
2	Bharatiya Janata Party		48	▲44
3	All India Majlis-e-Ittehadul Muslimeen		44	Steady
4	Indian National Congress		2	Steady
5	Telugu Desam Party		0	▼1

=== 2016 GHMC election ===
Second GHMC election were conduced in February 2016.

S.No.	Party Name	Symbol	Alliance	Won	Change
1	Telangana Rashtra Samithi		None	99	New
2	All India Majlis-e-Ittehadul Muslimeen		None	44	▲1
3	Bharatiya Janata Party		NDA	4	▼1
4	Indian National Congress		None	2	▼50
5	Telugu Desam Party		NDA	1	▼44

=== 2009 GHMC election ===
S.No.	Party Name	Symbol	Won
2	Indian National Congress		52
1	Telugu Desam Party		45
3	All India Majlis-e-Ittehadul Muslimeen		43
4	Bharatiya Janata Party		5
5	Independents		5

=== 2002 MCH election ===
Last Municipal Corporation of Hyderabad (MCH) elections were held in 2002 for a total of 99 wards.

S.No.	Party Name	Symbol	Won
1	All India Majlis-e-Ittehadul Muslimeen		34
2	Telugu Desam Party		22
3	Indian National Congress		19
4	Bharatiya Janata Party		18
5	Telangana Rashtra Samithi		2
6	Telangana Sadhana Samithi		1
7	Independents		3

== See also ==
- Administrative divisions of Hyderabad
- Hyderabad Metropolitan Development Authority
