= Malkajgiri (disambiguation) =

Malkajgiri is a suburb in Hyderabad, India

(Not to be confused with Malkangiri, a district in Odisha)

Malkajgiri may also refer to:

- Malkajgiri mandal
- Malkajgiri district
- Malkajgiri Revenue Division
- Malkajgiri (Lok Sabha constituency)
- Malkajgiri (Assembly constituency)
- Malkajgiri railway station
