= Yapral =

- Neighbourhood
- Location in Telangana, India Yapral (Telangana) Yapral (India)
- Coordinates: 17°30′N 78°33′E
- Country: India
- State: Telangana
- District: Medchal-Malkajgiri
- Mandal: Malkajgiri
- Metro: Hyderabad Metropolitan Development Authority

Government
  - Body: GHMC, Malkajgiri

Languages
  - Official: Telugu
- Time zone: UTC+5:30 (IST)
- PIN Code: 500087
- Vehicle registration: TS
- Lok Sabha constituency: Malkajgiri
- Vidhan Sabha constituency: Malkajgiri
- Planning agency: HMDA
- Civic agency: GHMC
- Website: telangana.gov.in

Yapral is a neighborhood in the suburbs of north-eastern Secunderabad, Telangana, India. It was known as a village Panchayat until the mid-1980s when it became part of the Municipal Corporation of Alwal (MCA). In 2007, 12 municipalities, including Alwal, and eight village Panchayats in and around Hyderabad were merged to become the Greater Hyderabad Municipal Corporation (GHMC). Since then, Yapral has been a part of GHMC (Neredmet Division, Malkajgiri Circle). But it falls under Alwal Revenue Mandal.

== Communities and neighborhoods ==
In the mid-1980s, Yapral was a village surrounded by agricultural land with less than 3000 residents. Shortly thereafter, the surrounding farmland transformed into a huge residential area consisting of posh, gated communities, and high-rise apartments. A similar change took place in the village itself, with most of the old houses being replaced by single/multi-story buildings. Posh communities in the village include Bhanu Enclave, Sylvan Greens, Oorjitha Rali Grand Villas, Greenwood Residency, Mecquery Royal Opal, Patel's green park, green front, Mani Enclave, Prakrutikh Vihar, jupally homes, Tulsi Gardens, Shaili Gardens, Mahalakshmipuri Colony, Radha Regal Rows, Swarnandhra, Pedso 1 and 2, Sabari Niwas, Habitat Royale, G K Pride, DBR Enclave, Shridi enclave, Shanthi nagar, Sai Krupa Colony, and Employees Colony, Sai enclave, Lake Meadows alongside many others like Rajha Convention. Nearby villages include Sainikpuri, Kapra, Alwal, Bolarum, and Kowkur. Thee Secunderabad Cantonment area is also nearby.

== Culture ==
Yapral lake was the major source of water for agriculture in the village. However, because of the local administration's failure to preserve it, the water quality has continued to degrade for decades. For example, residents now must search for pure water to immerse florals during the famous annual Bathukamma festival. The famous Hindu Mahankali, Pochamma, Ranganayak, Mallanna, and Sai baba temples are in Yapral. Also in the village is the Hanuman temple on the crossroads towards Kowkur village. Over many decades, the Mahankali Bonalu and Mallanna Jathara festivals have become a part of the village's annual tradition.

== Education and recreation ==
For decades, the Yapral Government School served as the major educational institution of the village and surrounding area. Later, Kendriya Vidyala, Valerian Grammar High School, and Pragathi High School were established for local students. Today, with Indus International School nearby, Yapral has state of the art study and sports facilities. The school is well known in Hyderabad, with students coming from various parts of the city. Yapral has three pay-and-use swimming pools open to the public. It also has many sports and recreation clubs – including a tennis academy, a horse riding club, a cricket academy and a carnival club. It also has a convention center named Rajha Convention.
