= Ammuguda =

- City
- Location in Telangana, India Ammuguda (Telangana) Ammuguda (India)
- Coordinates: 17.4974380°N 78.5334850°E
- Country: India
- State: Telangana
- District: Medchal-Malkajgiri district
- Mandal: Malkajgiri Mandal
- City Metropolitan: Secunderabad Hyderabad Metropolitan Development Authority
- Ward: 8th Ward SCB
- Police Station: Neredmet Police station

Government
  - Body: Secunderabad Cantonment Board

Area
  - Total: 6.5 km^{2} (2.5 sq mi)
- Elevation: 1,536 m (5,039 ft)

Population (Census 2009)
  - Total: 57,557
  - Density: 8,900/km^{2} (23,000/sq mi)

Languages
  - Official: Telugu
- Time zone: UTC+5:30 (IST)
- Postal code: 500056
- Lok Sabha constituency: Malkajgiri Lok Sabha constituency
- Vidhan Sabha constituency: Malkajgiri Assembly constituency
- Planning agency: HMDA

Ammuguda is a revenue village and also a part of 8th ward, Secunderabad Cantonment Board, urban sprawling of Secunderabad city in the Indian state of Telangana. It is located in Malkajgiri Mandal in Medchal district of the state. It is located in the North-East Part of Malkajgiri Mandal, Earlier it was a part Kapra Circle, then after districts reformed it added into Malkajgiri Mandal & Circle in 2017. It is a part of the Greater Hyderabad and also Hyderabad Metropolitan Region.

== Transportation ==
Ammuguda is well connected with rail and roads.

- Ammuguda railway station is in between Secunderabad JN - Bolarum railway station Route

== Notable people ==
The village is noted for having a Tamil community in Valluvar Nagar that produced football players such as Tulsidas Balaram, Peter Thangaraj, D. Kannan, and Victor Amalraj.
