= Bogaram =

- Village
- Location in Telangana, India Bogaram (India)
- Coordinates: 17.505637°N 78.686718°E
- Country: India
- State: Telangana

Languages
  - Official: Telugu
- Time zone: UTC+5:30 (IST)
- PIN: 501 301
- Telephone code: 040
- Vehicle registration: TS-26 X XXXX
- Sex ratio: 1:1(approx) ♂/♀
- Website: telangana.gov.in

Bogaram falls under Keesara mandal in Medchal-Malkajgiri District in the Indian state of Telangana. The village forms a part of fast developing area on the outskirts of Hyderabad, the capital city of Telangana. Hyderabad's central point Mahatma Gandhi Bus Depot is 32 km from this village. Nearest semi-urban locality Ghatkesar is 3.5 km away. Infosys SEZ at Pocharam is 12 km away from this village and nearest urban location Uppal is 21 km away.

== Connectivity ==
The village is well connected through road and suburban railway network. The closest railway station Ghatkesar Railway Station is 3.5 km away. The suburban train service MMTS connects Ghatkesar with several important places in Hyderabad, including IT hub Hitec City. The place is also well connected with road as National Highway 163 is just 15 minutes drive. The nearest Hyderabad Metro station is at Uppal, which is 21 km away, and is well-connected with buses.

== Educational Institutions ==
The place has two engineering colleges — Vignan Institute of Institute of Management and Technology for Women and Holy Mary Institute of Science and Technology. Vignana Bharati Institute of Technology, Anurag College of Engineering and SPR College of Engineering and Technology are within 12 km radius. Samskruti College of Pharmacy is 4 km away.

Delhi Public School, Ghatkesar campus, the largest in Hyderabad, is 7 km from this place, while Kendriya Vidyalaya, NFC Nagar campus, is 9 km away. Rotterdam International School is 12 km away.

== Healthcare ==
All India Institute of Medical Sciences, Bibingar campus, is 15 km from this village. Apart from this, there are five hospitals and nursing homes of different levels of specialisation about 5 km from this place.

== Entertainment and amusement ==
Entertainment and amusement options are available at Pocharam which is less than 30 minutes drive from Bogaram. Sim and Sam's Party and Playtown, Asian Mukta A2 Cinemas, Domino's, TapOut - Drive IN, Yallah Food Court, Broskis, McDonald's are some of available options.

== Demography ==
According to Census 2011, the location code of Bogaram village is 574149. It has a population of 2,544, which includes 1,270 men and 1,274 women. While the village has 526 houses, its geographical spread is 814 hectares, where new residential townships are being developed.
