= Anandbagh =

- Neighbourhood
- Location in the state of Telangana, India Anandbagh (Telangana) Anandbagh (India)
- Coordinates: 17°26′54″N 78°31′45″E
- Country: India
- State: Telangana
- District: Medchal–Malkajgiri
- City: Hyderabad

Government
  - Body: GHMC

Languages
  - Official: Telugu
- Time zone: UTC+5:30 (IST)
- PIN Code Postal Area and Head Office: 500047
- Vehicle registration: TG-08
- Lok Sabha constituency: Malkajgiri
- Vidhan Sabha constituency: Malkajgiri
- Planning agency: Hyderabad Metropolitan Development Authority

Anandbagh is a locality and a ward in Malkajgiri suburb of Hyderabad city. It falls under the Malkajgiri mandal of the Medchal-Malkajgiri district of the Indian State of Telangana. It is administered as Ward No. 139 of the Greater Hyderabad Municipal Corporation.

== Etymology ==
Anandbagh is a portmanteau of two words: Anand and Bagh, meaning Joy and Garden respectively in language. Therefore, Anandbagh translates to Joy Garden. Earlier(1578-1970's) times AnandBagh is forest in between Neredmet Village - Malkajgiri Village. Then it was converted into Agricultural fields and Fruit Gardens.

== Locality ==
Anandbagh is bifurcated into East Anandbagh and West Anandbagh. While East Anandbagh is predominantly residential, West Anandbagh has many commercial establishments. Nearby neighbourhoods include Safilguda, Vinayak Nagar, Neredmet and Moula Ali.

== Transportation ==
Anandbagh is well connected by TSRTC city bus services with Secunderabad and ECIL X Roads. The nearest railway station is Safilguda railway station and the nearest metro is Mettuguda metro station.
