= Amalraj =

Amalraj can be a masculine given name or a surname. Notable people with the surname include:

- Amalraj Anthony Arputharaj (born 1986), Indian table tennis player
- Victor Amalraj, Indian footballer
