= Medchal-Malkajgiri district =

Medchal–Malkajgiri మేడ్చల్ మల్కాజ్‌గిరి
- District of Telangana
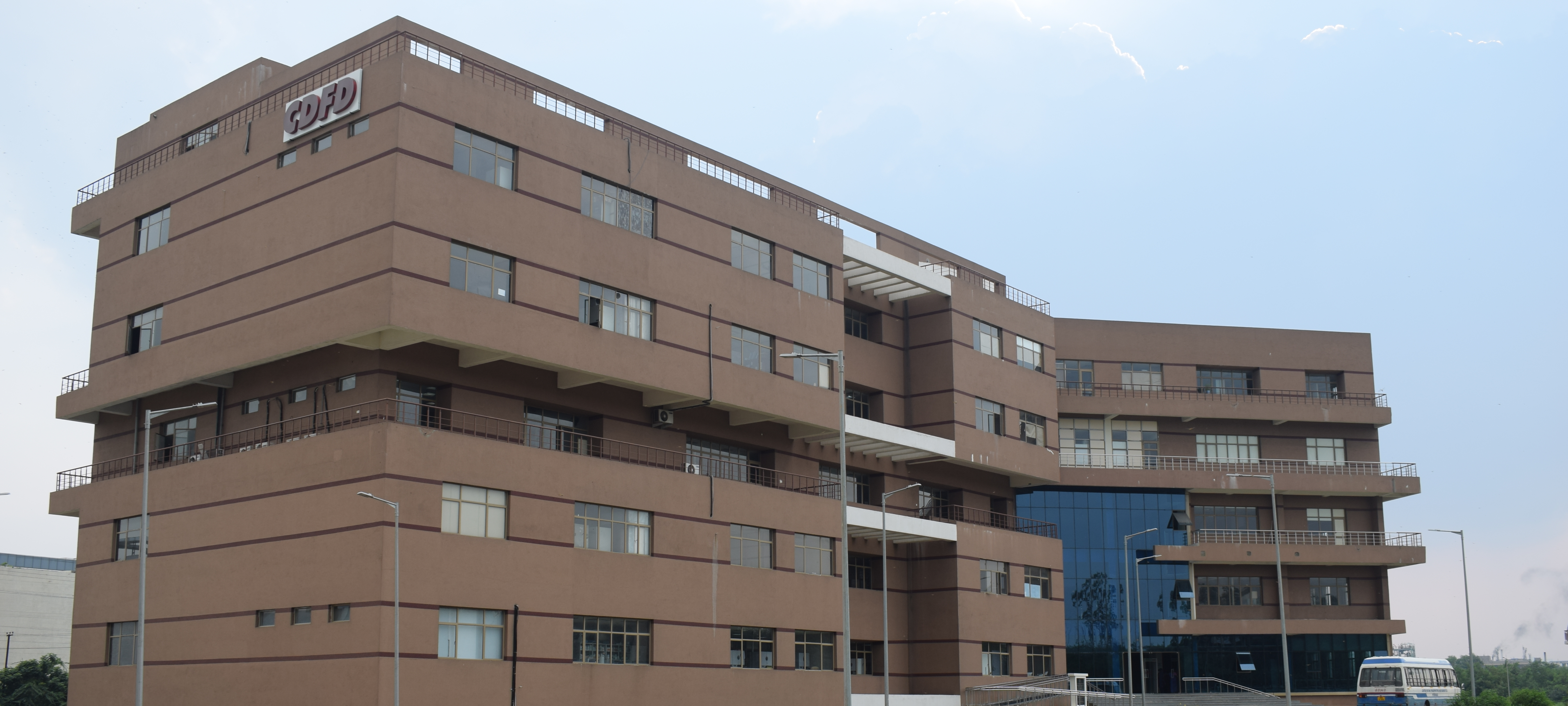
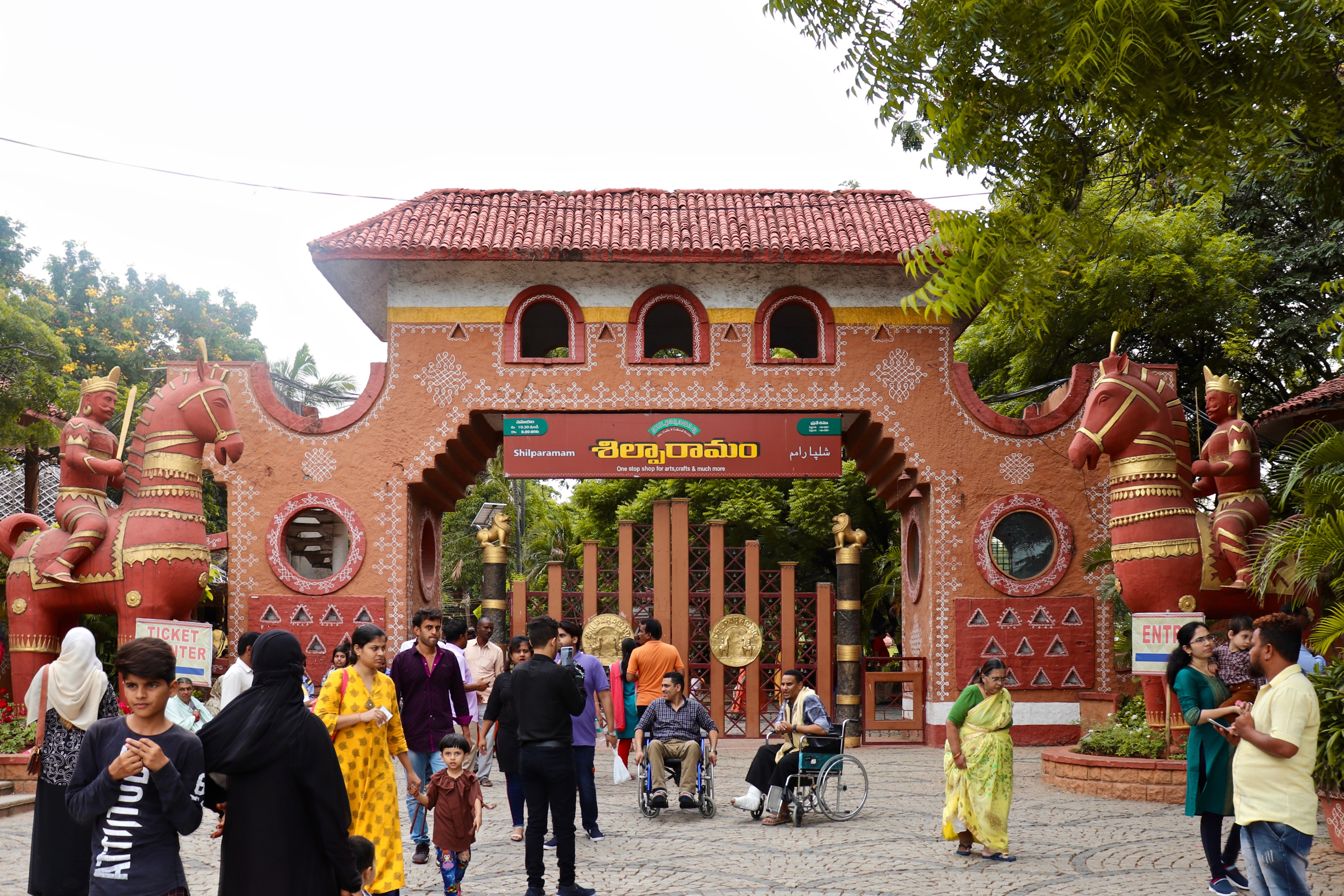
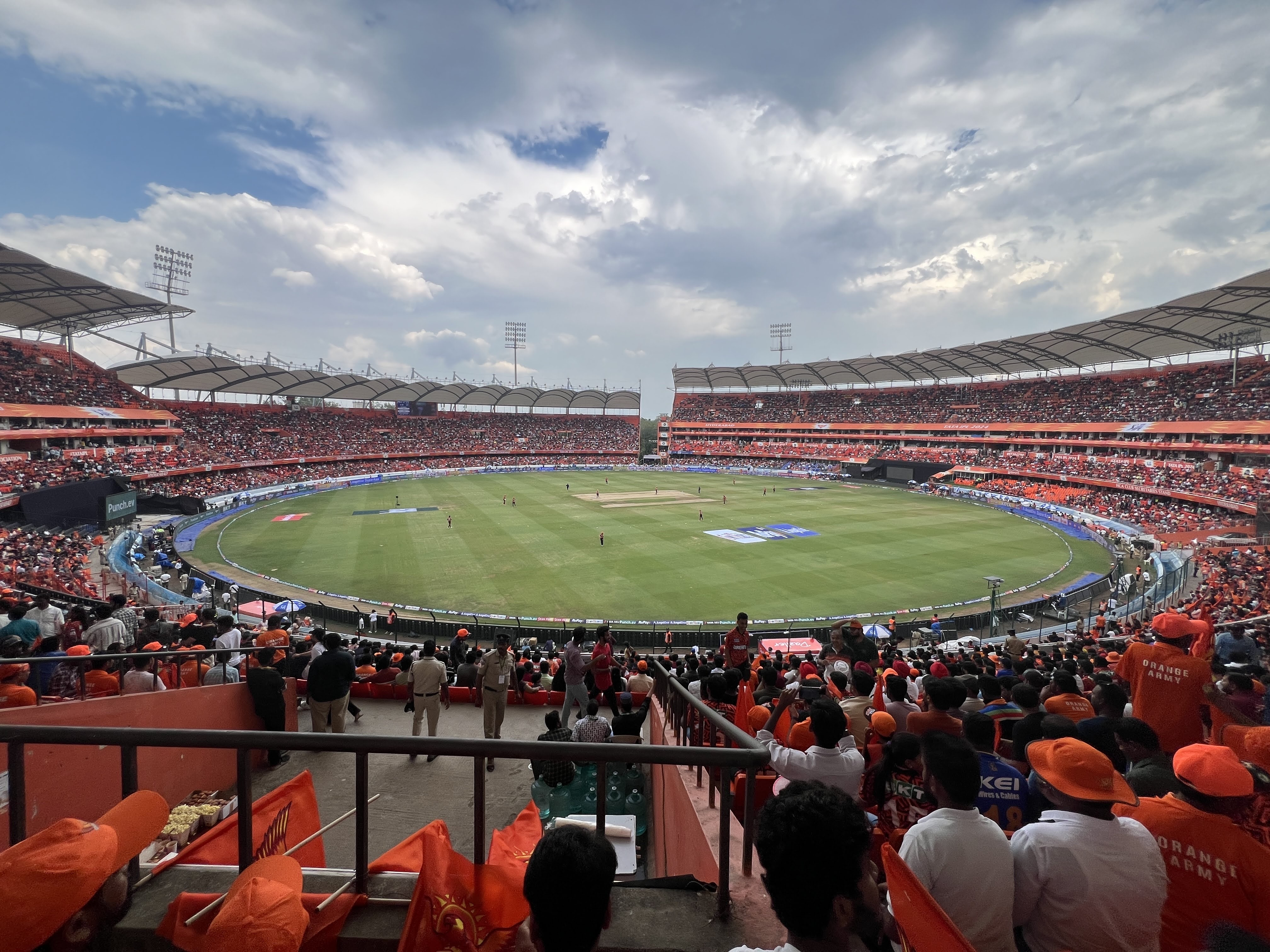
- Clockwise from top: The Jagannath Temple in Hyderabad, Pragati Nagar lake, CDFD Campus, Shilparamam, Rajiv Gandhi International Cricket Stadium
- Interactive map of Medchal–Malkajgiri
- Country: India
- State: Telangana
- Established: 11 October 2016
- Headquarters: Shamirpet
- Mandals: 15

Government
  - District Collector: Mikkilineni Manu Choudary, IAS
  - Parliament constituencies: 1 (Malkajgiri)
  - Assembly constituencies: 5 (Medchal, Malkajgiri, Quthbullapur, Kukatpally, Uppal)

Area
  - Total: 1,084 km^{2} (419 sq mi)

Population (2020)
  - Total: 2,440,073
  - Density: 2,251/km^{2} (5,830/sq mi)
  - Urban: 2,230,245

Demographics
  - Literacy: 82.49%
  - Sex ratio: 957
- Time zone: UTC+05:30 (IST)
- Vehicle registration: TG–08
- Nominal GDP (2022-23): ₹88,866.72 crore (US$11.31 billion)
- Per Capita Income (2022-23): ₹295,514 (US$3,759.5)
- Website: medchal-malkajgiri.telangana.gov.in

Medchal−Malkajgiri is a district in the Indian state of Telangana. Shamirpet is the headquarter of the district. It is the second most populous district in the state with a population of 2.5 million, standing next only to Hyderabad district which has a population of 4 million. The district shares boundaries with Hyderabad, Medak, Sangareddy, Yadadri, Siddipet and Rangareddy districts. Most of the district falls under the jurisdiction of the Malkajgiri Municipal Corporation, while other portions are administered by the Cyberabad Municipal Corporation.

== History ==
=== Early and medieval history ===
The region of Medchal–Malkajgiri district has a long history of human habitation dating to the prehistoric era, with several megalithic burial sites and stone circles identified in areas such as Muduchintalapalli and Keesara.

During the 4th to 7th centuries CE, the region was an important religious and administrative center under the Vishnukundina dynasty. Extensive archaeological excavations at Keesaragutta located near the present-day district administrative headquarters, unearthed ruins of 5th-century brick temples, rock-cut cisterns, Shiva lingas, and early Jain Tirthankara bronzes. The site also has an early Telugu label inscription ("Toluchuvanru") dated to the 5th century CE. The territory subsequently came under the rule of the Chalukyas, the Kakatiya dynasty, the Bahmani Sultanate, and later the Golconda Sultanate.

=== Modern era ===
Under the Nizams of Hyderabad in the 18th and 19th centuries, Medchal served as a rural market along the northern routes toward Nizamabad. Following the construction of the Nizam's Guaranteed State Railway (NGSR), areas such as Malkajgiri, Moula Ali, and Alwal underwent urbanization and developed railway junctions and military cantonment extensions.

After independence, the region transformed into an industrial and defense hub with the establishment of major public sector enterprises, including the Electronics Corporation of India Limited (ECIL) and the Nuclear Fuel Complex (NFC) in the 1960s and 1970s.

=== District formation ===
Administratively, the region was originally part of Hyderabad district before being included in Ranga Reddy district, which was carved out of Hyderabad district in 1978. Originally established as Hyderabad Rural district, it was later renamed in honour of Konda Venkata Ranga Reddy, a freedom fighter who fought for independence of Telangana from Nizam rule. On 11 October 2016, as part of the state-wide reorganization of districts by the Government of Telangana, Medchal–Malkajgiri district was officially carved out of the northern and eastern mandals of Ranga Reddy district, with its headquarters first established at Keesara, later moved to Anthaipally village in Shamirpet mandal.

== Geography ==
The district is spread over an area of 1,084 square kilometres (419 sq mi) at an average elevation of 505 metres (1,657 ft) above sea level on the Deccan Plateau. Its landscape is characterized by rocky terrain, granite sheet rocks, and monolithic boulder formations characteristic of the Hyderabad region. The district hasnseveral prominent water bodies, including Shamirpet Lake, Kapra Lake, and Safilguda Lake.

== Politics ==
Medchal–Malkajgiri district falls under the Malkajgiri Lok Sabha constituency for parliamentary elections and consists of five Telangana Legislative Assembly constituencies: Medchal, Malkajgiri, Quthbullapur, Kukatpally, and Uppal.

=== Parliamentary constituency ===
The district is represented in the Lok Sabha (the lower house of the Parliament of India) by the Malkajgiri Lok Sabha constituency (PC No. 7), which is the largest parliamentary constituency in India by number of electors. In addition to the five assembly segments within Medchal–Malkajgiri district, the parliamentary constituency also includes L. B. Nagar (in Ranga Reddy district) and Secunderabad Cantonment (in Hyderabad district).

2024 Indian general election results: Malkajgiri Lok Sabha constituency
PC No.	Constituency	Elected MP	Party	Runner-up	Party	Margin
7	Malkajgiri	Etela Rajender	BJP	Patnam Suneetha Mahender Reddy	INC	3,91,475

=== Legislative Assembly constituencies ===
Medchal–Malkajgiri district has 5 seats in the Telangana Legislative Assembly. In the 2023 Telangana Legislative Assembly election, the Bharat Rashtra Samithi (BRS) swept all five assembly constituencies in the district.

2023 Telangana Legislative Assembly election results in Medchal–Malkajgiri district
AC No.	Constituency	Elected MLA	Party	Votes	Vote %	Runner-up	Party	Votes	Vote %	Margin
43	Medchal	Chamakura Malla Reddy	BRS	1,86,017	46.44%	Thotakura Vajresh Yadav	INC	1,52,598	38.10%	33,419
44	Malkajgiri	Marri Rajasekhar Reddy	BRS	1,25,049	47.12%	Mynampally Hanumanth Rao	INC	75,519	28.45%	49,530
45	Quthbullapur	K. P. Vivekanand	BRS	1,87,999	46.80%	Kuna Srisailam Goud	BJP	1,02,423	25.50%	85,576
46	Kukatpally	Madhavaram Krishna Rao	BRS	1,35,635	54.08%	Bandi Ramesh	INC	65,248	26.02%	70,387
47	Uppal	Bandari Lakshma Reddy	BRS	1,32,927	48.33%	M. Parameshwar Reddy	INC	83,897	30.51%	49,030

== Demographics ==
Religion in Medchal-Malkajgiri district (2011)
Hinduism	84.85%
Islam	9.24%
Christianity	4.02%
Other or not stated	1.89%

As of 2011 census of India, the district is the second most populous district in the state with a population of 2,440,073. Medchal-Malkajgiri has a sex ratio of 957 females per 1000 males and a literacy rate of 82.49%. 285,044 (11.68%) are under 6 years of age. 2,230,245 (91.40%) live in urban areas, the second highest proportion in the state. Scheduled Castes and Scheduled Tribes make up 229,188 (9.39%) and 55,244 (2.26%) of the population respectively.

Languages of Medchal-Malkajgiri district (2011)
1. Telugu (80.3%)
2. Urdu (8.03%)
3. Hindi (3.94%)
4. Tamil (1.76%)
5. Marathi (1.28%)
6. Lambadi (0.92%)
7. Others (3.72%)

At the time of the 2011 census, 80.35% of the population spoke Telugu, 8.03% Urdu, 3.94% Hindi, 1.76% Tamil, 1.28% Marathi and 0.92% Lambadi as their first language.

== Education and research ==
Medchal–Malkajgiri district hosts major national research facilities, national academies, universities, and technical institutions in Telangana. They are concentrated primarily in the Shameerpet Genome Valley and life sciences corridor, the Ghatkesar educational zone, and the Dundigal aviation belt.

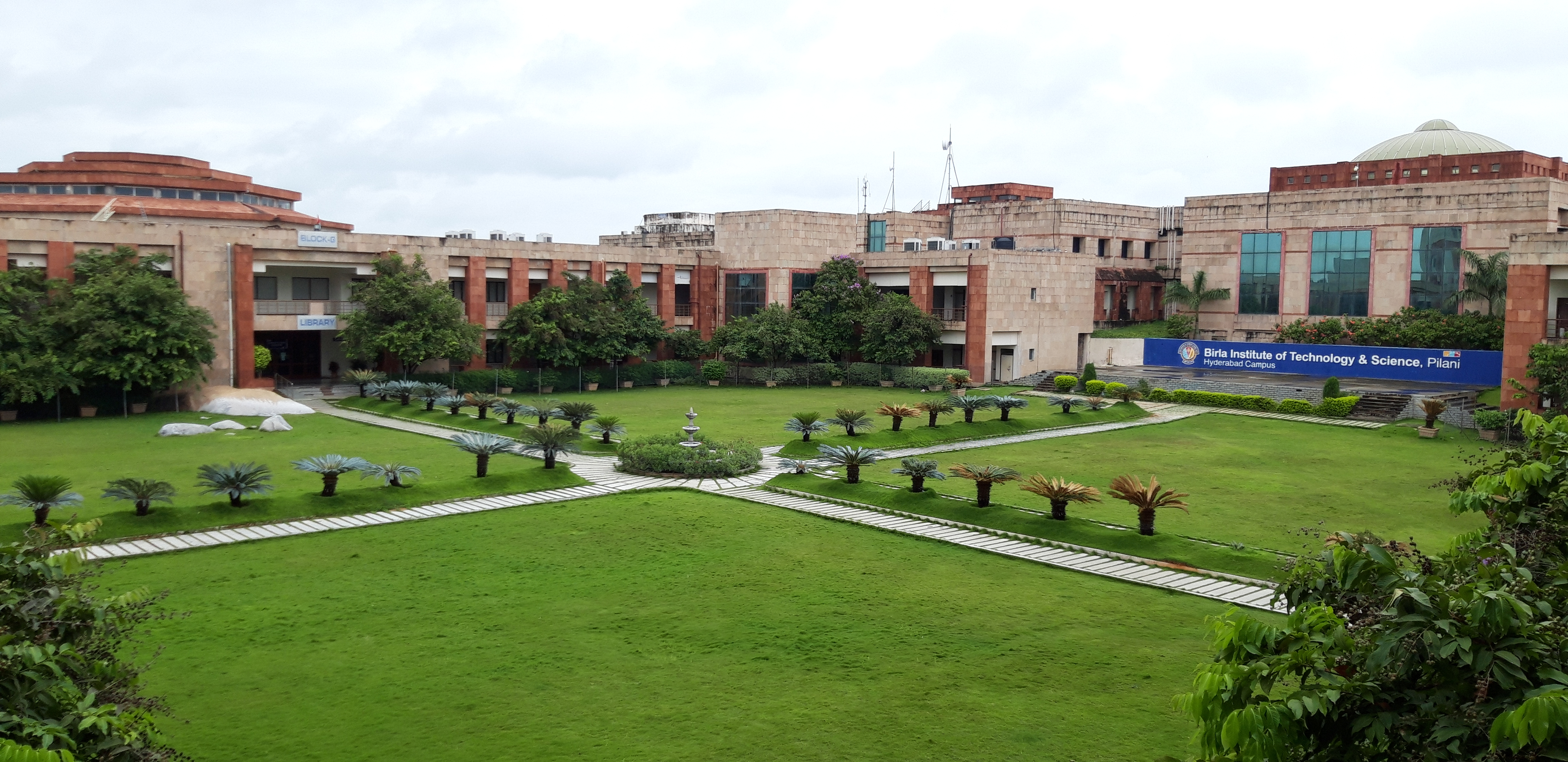
BITS Pilani, Hyderabad

Air Force Academy, Dundigal

Notable colleges and universities based within the district include:

- ICFRE – Institute of Forest Biodiversity (IFB)
- National Institute of Preclinical Research (NIPCR)
- ICMR – National Animal Resource Facility for Biomedical Research (NARFBR)
- Centre for DNA Fingerprinting and Diagnostics (CDFD)
- IKP Knowledge Park
- Air Force Academy (AFA), Dundigal
- Air Force Station, Hakimpet
- BITS Pilani, Hyderabad Campus
- NALSAR University of Law
- Mahindra University (Bahadurpally)
- Anurag University
- Malla Reddy University
- VNR Vignana Jyothi Institute of Engineering and Technology (VNR VJIET)
- Sreenidhi Institute of Science and Technology (SNIST)
- CMR College of Engineering & Technology
- ACE Engineering College
- Geethanjali College of Engineering and Technology
- Vignana Bharathi Institute of Technology (VBIT)
- Government Medical College, Medchal–Malkajgiri
- MediCiti Institute of Medical Sciences (MIMS)
- Arundathi Institute of Medical Sciences, Dundigal
- Army College of Dental Sciences (ACDS)

== Administrative divisions ==
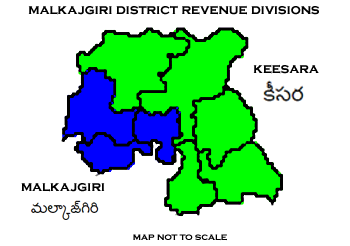
Medchal – Malkajgiri District Revenue divisions

The district has two revenue divisions of Keesara and Malkajgiri. They are divided into 15 mandals. Sri Mikkilineni Manu Chowdary, IAS, is the District Collector.

=== Mandals ===
The below table categorizes mandals into their respective revenue divisions in the district:

#	Malkajgiri revenue division	#	Keesara revenue division
1	Alwal	1	Ghatkesar
2	Bachupally	2	Kapra
3	Balanagar	3	Keesara
4	Dundigal Gandimaisamma	4	Medchal
5	Kukatpally	5	Medipally, Telangana
6	Malkajgiri	6	Shamirpet
7	Quthbullapur	7	Uppal
		8	Muduchintalpalli

== Transportation ==
The Telangana State Road Transport Corporation (TGSRTC) operates high-frequency city and suburban bus services across the district. Key bus depots and major transit terminals include ECIL Bus Terminal, Medchal Bus Station, Kushaiguda Depot, Uppal Bus Depot, Balanagar, and Chengicherla Depot.

KZJ WDM-3A 14031 cruising through Cavalry Barracks on a misty morning with 17019 Ajmer - Hyderabad Express.

The district is a core corridor for the Multi-Modal Transport System (MMTS) operated by South Central Railway (SCR). Secunderabad – Bolarum – Medchal line connects northern suburbs directly to central Hyderabad with suburban stations including Dayanand Nagar, Safilguda, Ramakistapuram (RK Puram) Gate, Ammuguda, Cavalry Barracks, Alwal, Bolarum, Gundlapochampally, and Medchal. The Moula Ali – Ghatkesar/Cherlapally section connects eastern areas through Moula Ali, Cherlapally, and Ghatkesar.

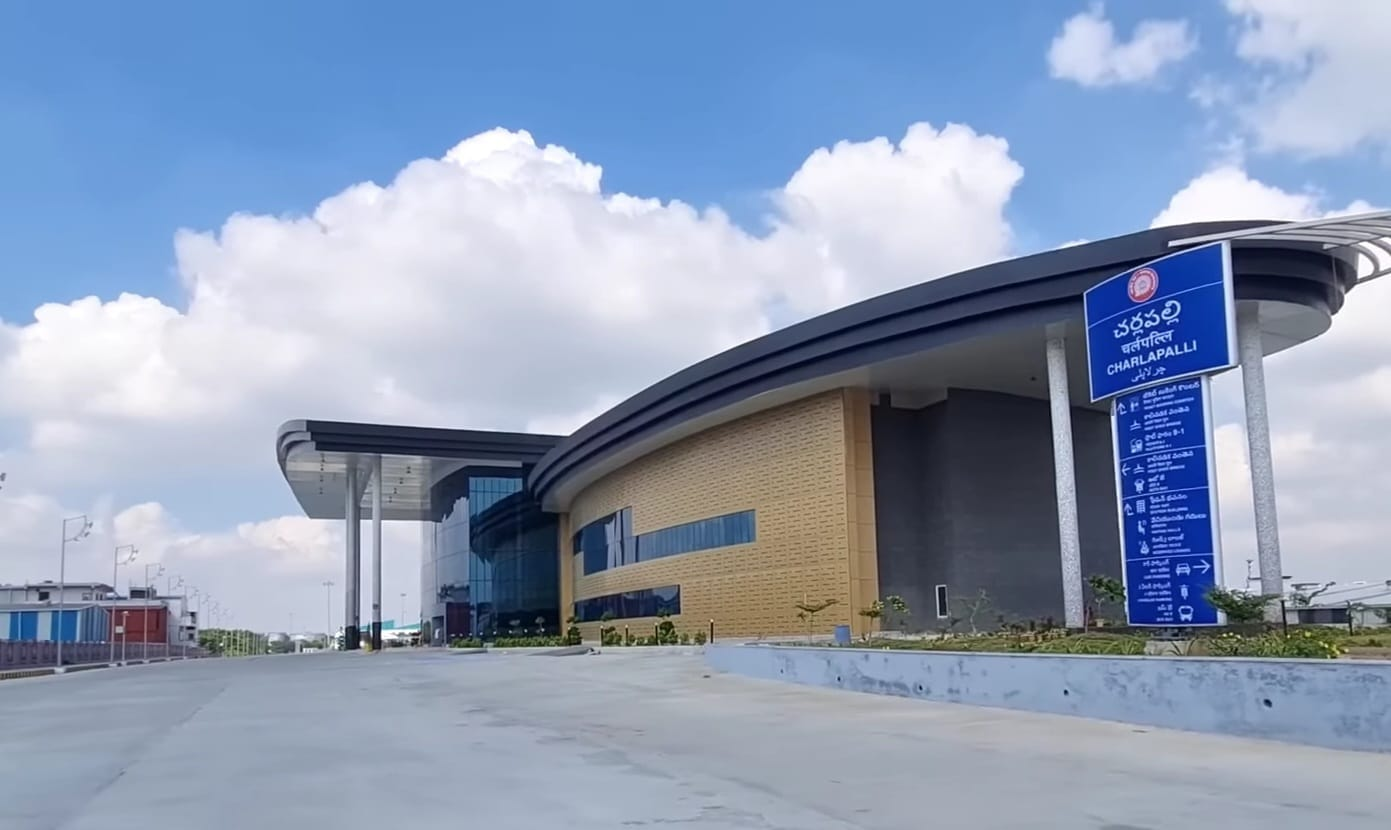
Charlapalli railway station

The newly developed Cherlapally Railway Terminal, positioned as Hyderabad's fourth major mega railway terminal (alongside Secunderabad, Hyderabad Deccan/Nampally, and Kacheguda), falls right in the Medchal-Malkajgiri district.

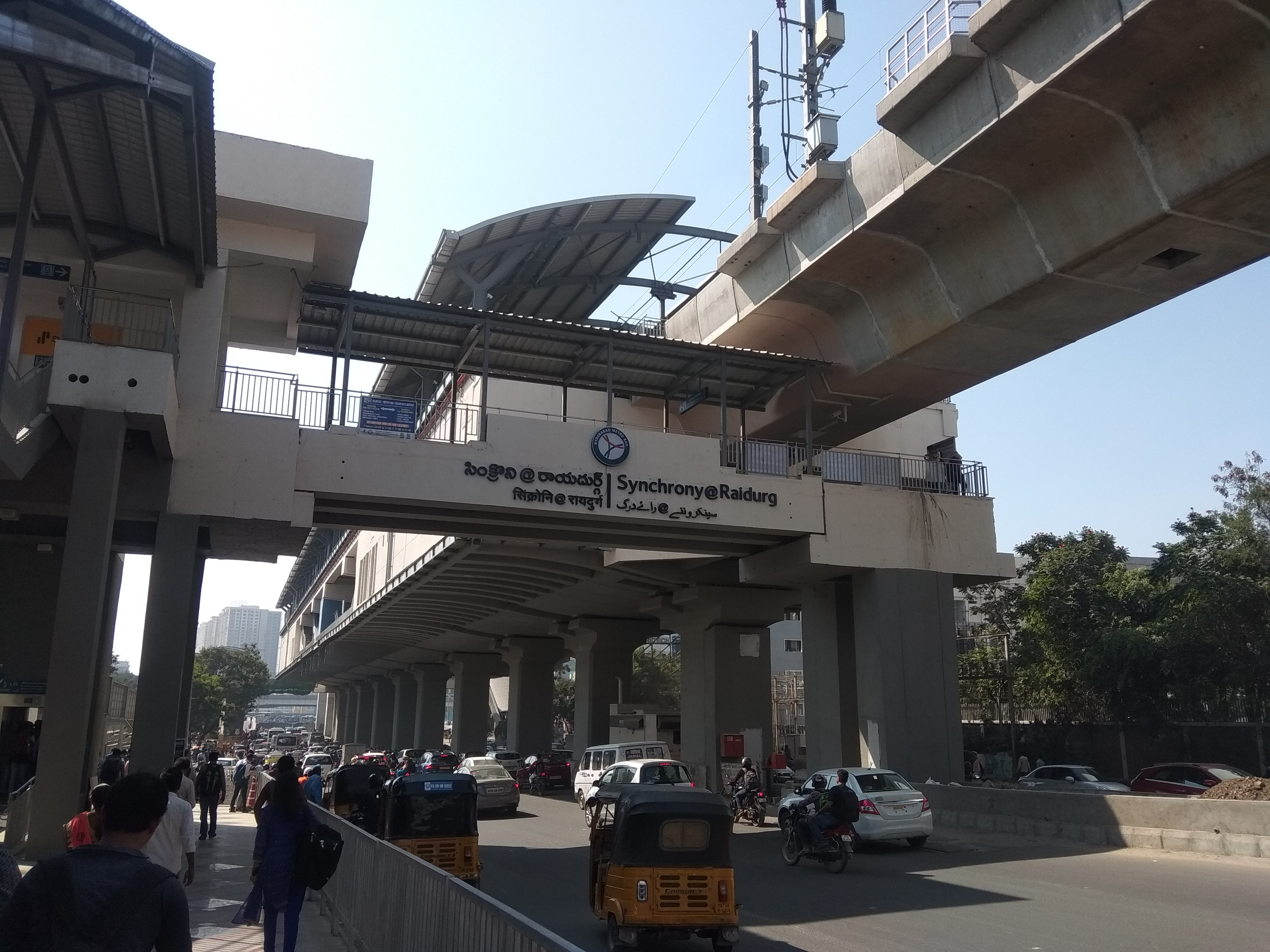
Raidurg metro station

The district hosts multiple stations across two major lines of the Hyderabad Metro Rail (HMRL). The Blue Line (Nagole – Raidurg) passes directly through the eastern revenue limits of the district, Nagole and Uppal. The Red Line (Miyapur – LB Nagar) serves parts of the northwestern industrial and residential belt around Balanagar, Kukatpally, and JNTU.

There is no active commercial passenger airport within Medchal-Malkajgiri district. The district is served by Rajiv Gandhi International Airport (RGIA - HYD), located south of the city in Shamshabad (Rangareddy district). It connects to RGIA via the Nehru Outer Ring Road (ORR).

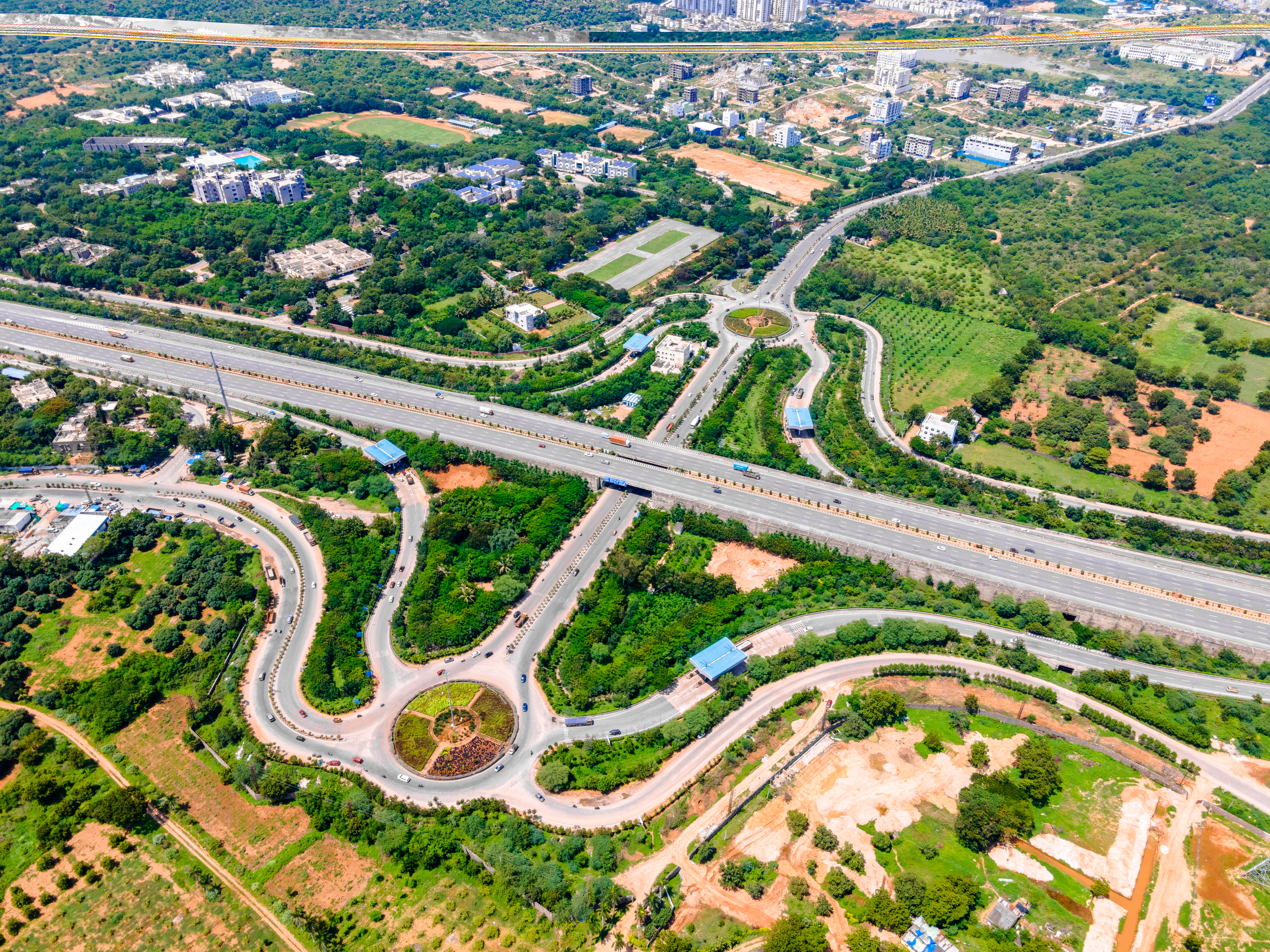
Outer Ring Road (ORR), Malkajgiri

Medchal-Malkajgiri is served by Nehru Outer Ring Road (ORR-NH 765D), National Highway 44 (NH-44) and National Highway 65 (NH-65). The National Highway 163 (NH-163) connects Jharkhand to Kodangal, Vikarabad in western Telangana passing through Malkajgiri, The State Highway 1 connects Hyderabad through Shamirpet towards Karimnagar and northern Telangana.

== See also ==
- List of districts in Telangana
