= Kowkur =

- Village
- Location in Hyderabad, Telangana, India Kowkur (Telangana) Kowkur (India)
- Coordinates: 17.532374°N 78.529446°E
- Country: India
- State: Telangana
- District: Medchal district
- Mandal: Malkajgiri
- City: Secunderabad
- Metro: Hyderabad Metropolitan Development Authority

Languages
  - Official: Telugu
- Time zone: UTC+5:30 (IST)
- Telephone code: 040
- Vehicle registration: TS 07 X XXXX
- Sex ratio: 1:1(approx) ♂/♀

Kowkur is a Town in Malkajgiri mandal, Medchal district in Telangana, India.
