= Bolarum Bazar railway station =

Railway station in Secunderabad, India

Bolarum Bazar
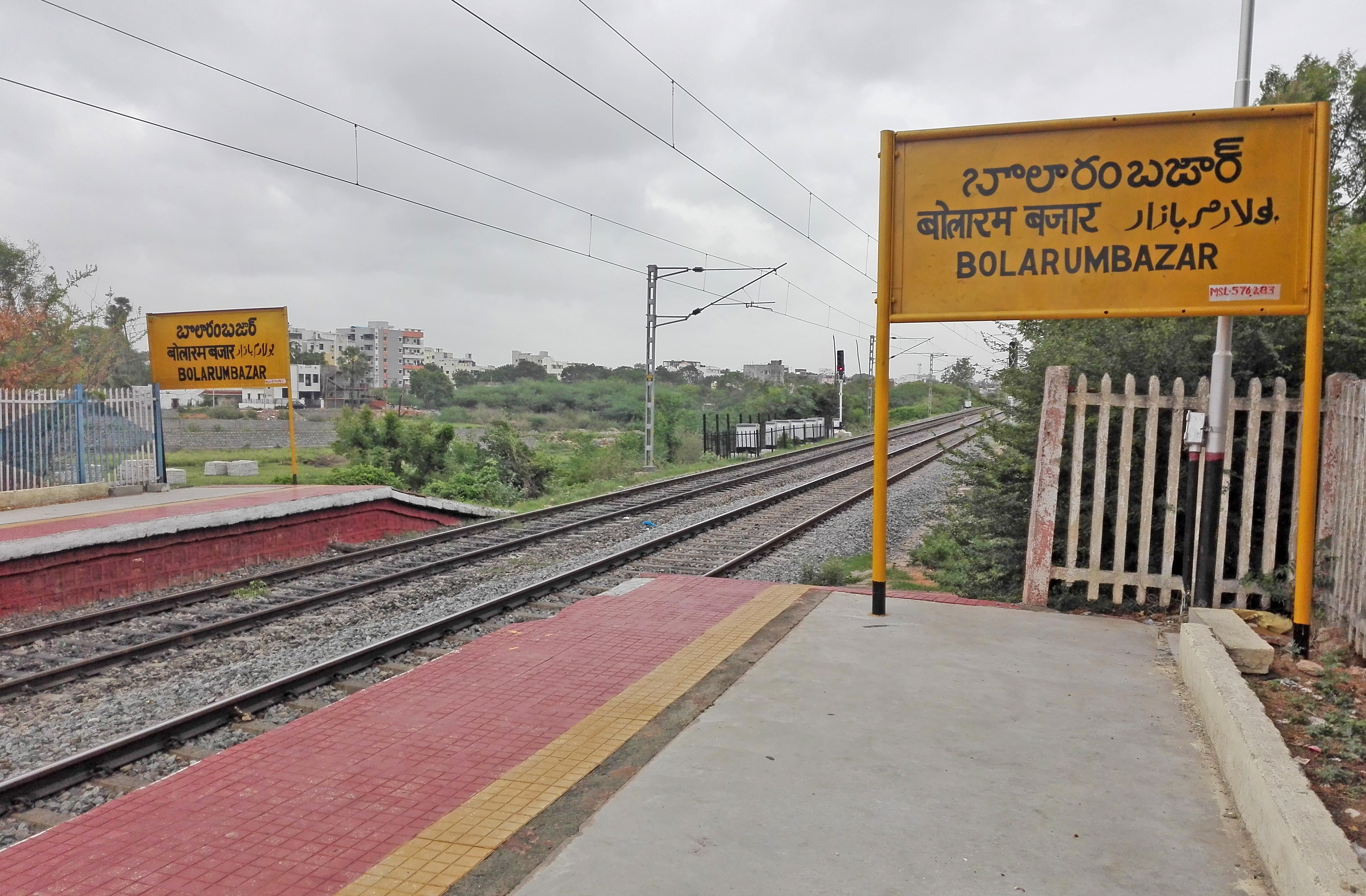
- Bolarum Bazar Railway station North End

General information
- Location: India
- Coordinates: 17.360°N 78.492°E
- System: Indian Railways and Hyderabad MMTS station
- Owner: Indian Railways
- Operator: Hyderabad MMTS
- Line: Secunderabad–Bolarum route

Construction
- Structure type: Standard
- Parking: Yes
- Accessible: Yes
Location

Bolarum Bazar is a railway station in Hyderabad, Telangana, India located on the Manmad–Kachiguda section of the South Central Railway. Macha Bollaram, a suburb of Hyderabad, is accessible from this station.

== Lines ==
- Hyderabad Multi-Modal Transport System
  - Secunderabad–Bolarum route – (SB Line)
