= Tirupati–Amravati Express =

Train in India

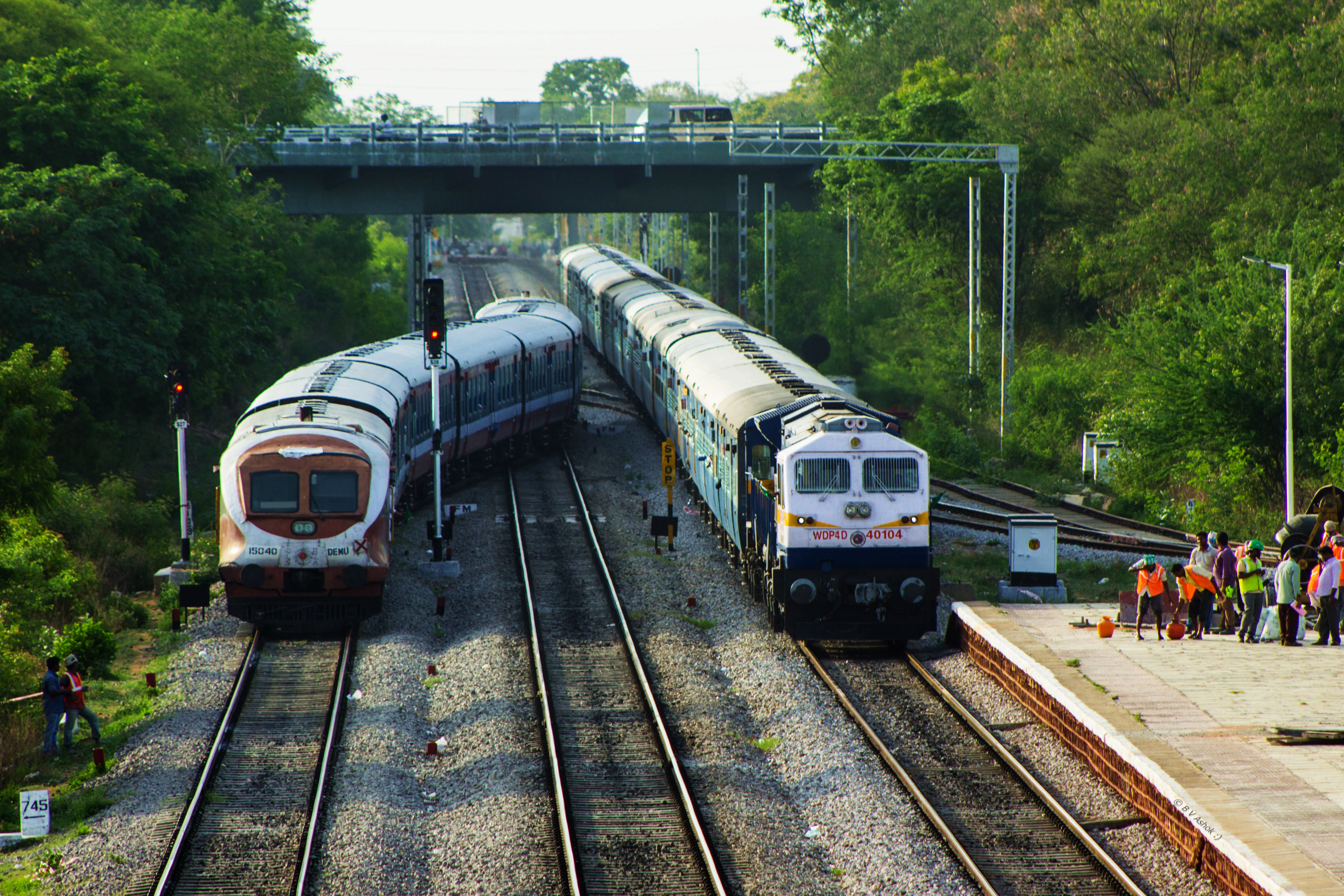
- Tirupathi Superfast Express cruising past DEMU passenger at Cavalry Barracks

Overview
- Service type: Superfast
- Locale: Andhra Pradesh, Telangana & Maharashtra
- First service: 15 December 2011; 14 years ago
- Current operator: South Coast Railway

Route
- Termini: Tirupati (TPTY); Amravati (AMI)
- Stops: 22
- Distance travelled: 1,309 km (813 mi)
- Average journey time: 23 hrs 40 mins
- Service frequency: Bi-weekly
- Train number: 12765 / 12766

On-board services
- Classes: AC 2 Tier, AC 3 Tier, Sleeper Class, General Unreserved
- Seating arrangements: Yes
- Sleeping arrangements: Yes
- Catering facilities: On-board catering, E-catering
- Observation facilities: Large windows
- Entertainment facilities: No
- Baggage facilities: No
- Other facilities: Below the seats

Technical
- Rolling stock: LHB coach
- Track gauge: Broad Gauge
- Operating speed: 55 km/h (34 mph) average including halts.
Route map
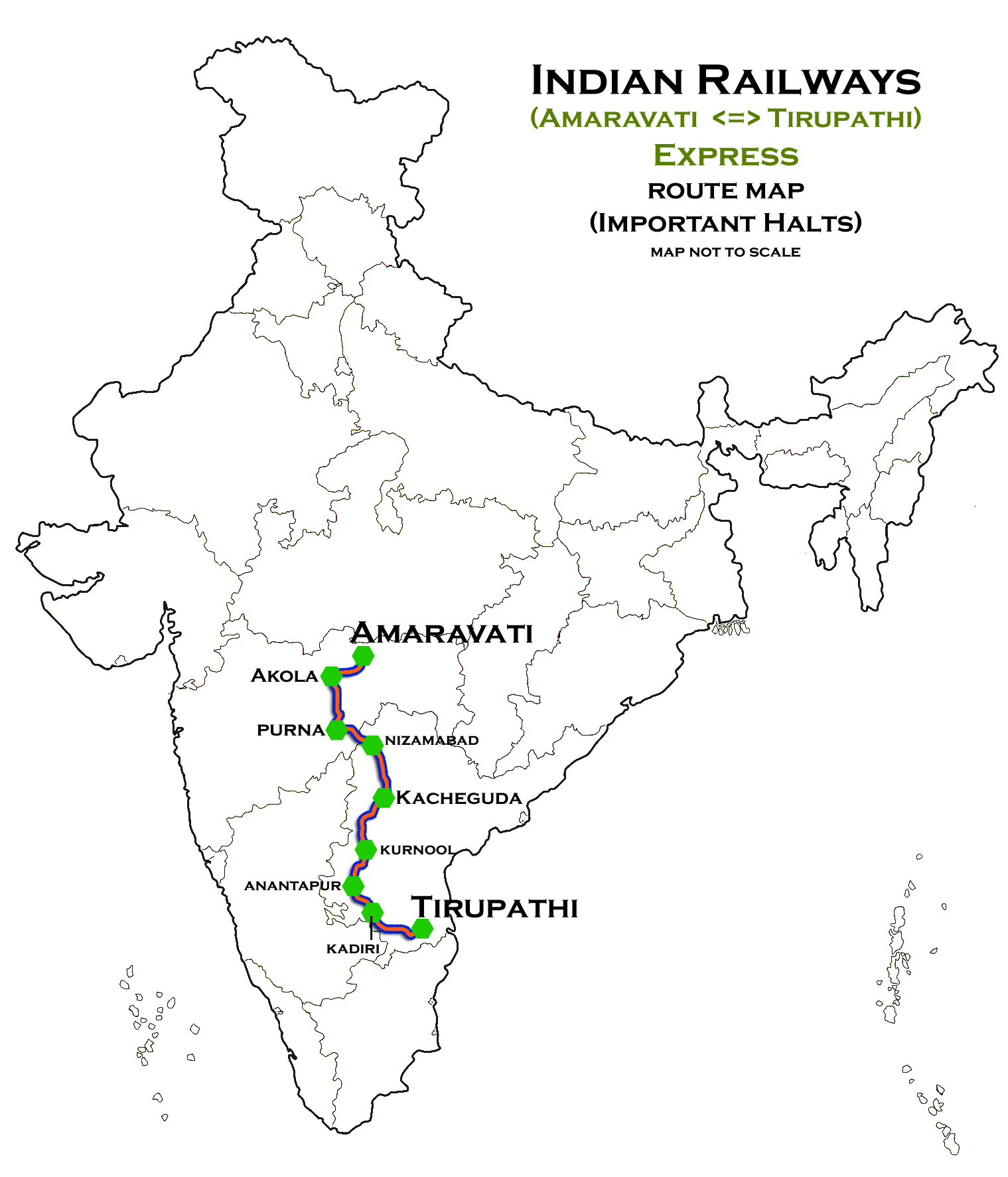

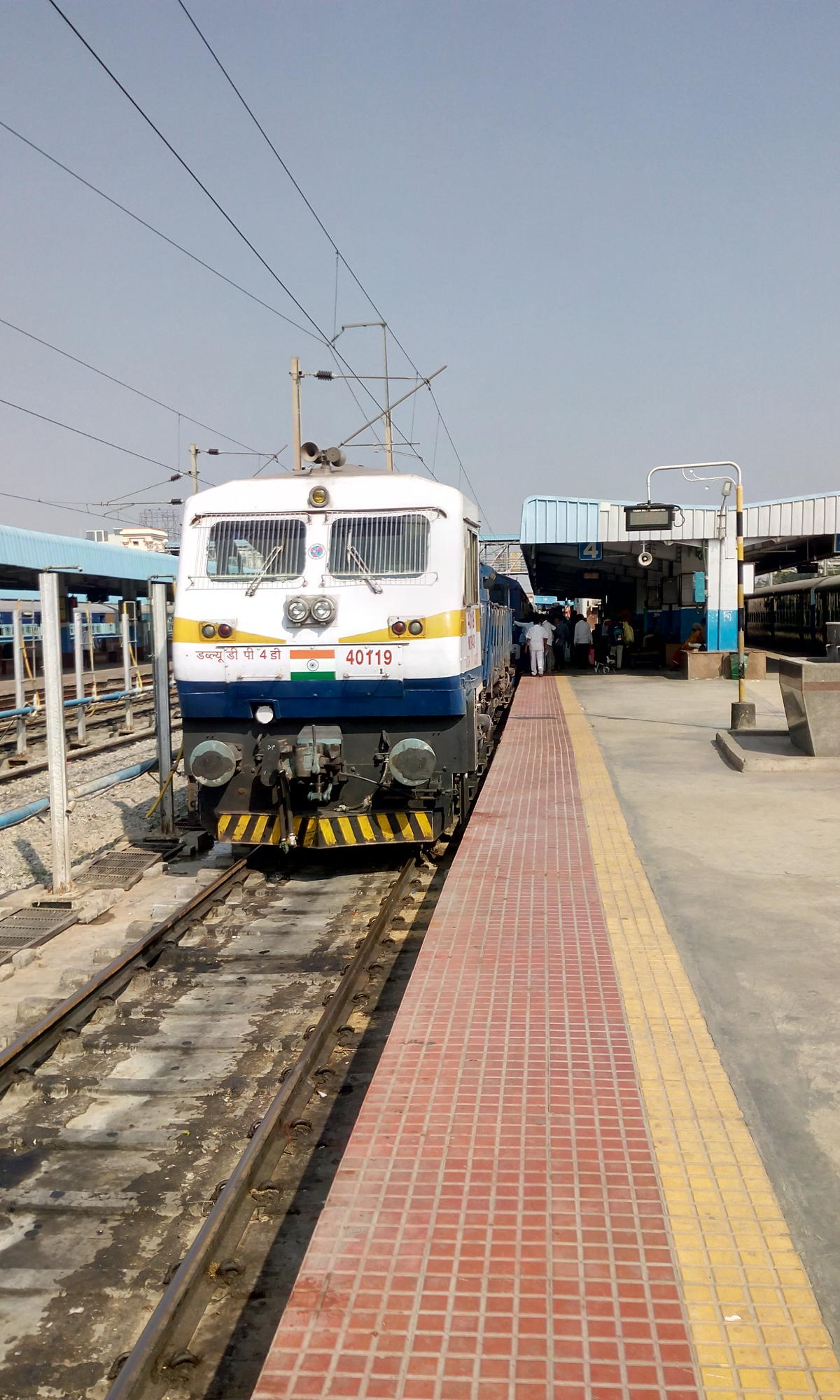
Tirupati–Amravati Express waiting to depart at station

The 12765 / 12766 Tirupati–Amravati Express is a Superfast train belonging to Indian Railways connecting Tirupati in Andhra Pradesh with Amravati in Maharashtra.

== Route & halts ==
Tirupati, Pakala, Piler, Madanapalle, Kadiri, Dharmavaram, Anantapur, Dhone, Kurnool, Mahabubnagar, Kacheguda, Nizamabad, Hazur Sahib Nanded, Purna, Akola, Badnera, Amravati.

== Traction ==
It is hauled by a Vijayawada Loco Shed-based WAP-4 Electric locomotive on its entire journey.

== Direction reversals ==
The train reverses its direction twice at;

- Akola Junction
- Purna Junction.
