= Lallaguda railway station =

Railway station in Telangana

General information
- Coordinates: 17.360°N 78.492°E
- System: Indian Railways and Hyderabad MMTS station
- Owner: ISRTC
- Platforms: 2
Location

Lallaguda railway station in Hyderabad, Telangana, India, located on the Manmad–Kachiguda section of South Central Railway. Localities like Lallaguda and Tukaramgate are accessible from this station.It also has a special type of stairs for bicycle and disabled people.It also has a bridge underneath it for vehicles to pass without stopping.

== Electric Loco Shed ==
Lallaguda Loco Shed holds 200+ 3 phaser locomotives like WAP-7 & WAG-9. It holds 110+ WAP-7 locomotives & 120+ WAG-9 locomotives. Earlier it was used to hold WAP-4 and WAG-7 locomotives which have now been transferred to Vijayawada and Guntakal loco shed.

== Lines ==
- Hyderabad Multi-Modal Transport System
  - Secunderabad–Bolarum route (BS Line)
