= John Victor (Indian footballer) =

Indian football player

Personal information
- Date of birth: October 1942
- Date of death: 17 November 2015 (aged 73)
- Place of death: Secunderabad, Telangana, India

Senior career*
Years	Team	Apps	(Gls)
1966–????	Mohammedan SC		
- East Bengal FC
- Mohun Bagan Super Giant
- * Club domestic league appearances and goals

John Victor (October 1942 – 17 November 2015) was an Indian footballer and coach.

== Career ==
Victor learned football in the twin cities of Hyderabad and Secunderabad. He was selected for Mohammedan SC in 1966 as a defender. He was subsequently selected for the Indian team and played at the 1967–68 Merdeka Tournament in Malaysia. He also played for East Bengal FC and Mohun Bagan Super Giant till 1972. From 1983 to 1984, he coached the national team. From 1985 to 2002, he coached the Andhra Pradesh football team and also coached the Bihar and Maharashtra football teams.

From 1982 to 2006, he worked as the District Sports Development Officer in the Sports Authority of Andhra Pradesh. He used to teach football at summer camps in Secunderabad.

In 2012, he was awarded the Shan-E-Mohammedan by Mohammedan SC.

== Personal life ==
He was married with two sons and a daughter. He also had a younger brother, Victor Amalraj, who was also a footballer. After retiring from football, he joined the State Bank of Hyderabad and settled in Secunderabad. He died on 17 November 2015 at the age of 73.
