= Malkajgiri Revenue Division =

- Revenue Division
- Interactive map of Malkajgiri Revenue Division
- Country: India
- State: Telangana
- Headquarters: Malkajgiri
- Tehsils: 7

Government
  - District collector: Venkateswarlu

Area
  - Total: 1,084 km^{2} (419 sq mi)

Population (2011)
  - Total: 2,440,073
  - Density: 2,251/km^{2} (5,830/sq mi)
- Time zone: UTC+05:30 (IST)
- Vehicle registration: TS–08
- Website: medchal.telangana.gov.in

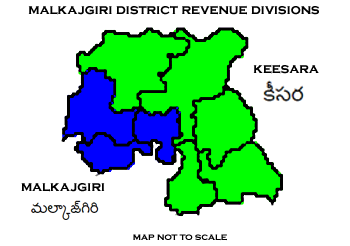
Medchal - Malkajgiri District Revenue divisions

Malkajgiri Revenue Division is a revenue division in Medchal–Malkajgiri district in the Indian state of Telangana.

Malkajgiri revenue division

- 1 Alwal
- 2 Bachupally
- 3 Balanagar
- 4 Dundigal Gandimaisamma
- 5 Kukatpally
- 6 Malkajgiri
- 7 Quthbullapur
