= Ghatkesar railway station =

Railway station in Telangana, India

Ghatkesar

General information
- Location: Ghatkesar, Telangana; India
- Coordinates: 17°27′10″N 78°40′42″E
- Elevation: 477.14 m (1,565.4 ft)
- System: Indian Railway Station
- Owner: Indian Railways
- Operator: South Central Railway
- Platforms: 2
- Tracks: 4

Construction
- Structure type: Standard (on ground station)
- Parking: Yes (Available)

Other information
- Status: Working
- Station code: GT
- Zone(s): South Central Railway
- Division(s): Secundrabad
Location
- Location within Telangana Location within India

Ghatkesar (station code:GT), where, Ghat means Mountains and Kesar (Keseri) means Saffron of Persia, this is also a railway station located in Ghatkesar town, Medchal district on Secunderabad-Bibinagar line, which falls under South Central Railway (SCR), Secunderabad division. Ghatkesar is considered to be the capital suburbs of Hyderabad. The Ghatkesar Railway Station is serviced for 18 trains daily. Most of these services pass through the station. The Kazipet – Secunderabad and Tenali –Guntur – Secunderabad which passes through the station

== Services ==
Passenger train services from Secunderabad to Guntur and Kajipetta division MEMU, DEMU, Passenger service starts from Bhongiri railway Station to Falaknuma railway station

Multi Modal Transport System (MMTS) Phase II work is nearing completion which will connect this Capitol suburbs with rest of the city over railway network.

Now Ghat Keseri station has four platforms and Quadru tracks to Secunderabad for operation of the MMTS Dedicated Corridor. It is a terminal end point of MMTS Phase two, and later extended to Yadhadhiri in the future pilgrimages.
