= Victor Amalraj =

Indian football player

Personal information
- Date of birth: 16 December 1958 (age 67)
- Place of birth: Bolarum, Andhra Pradesh, India

Senior career*
Years	Team	Apps	(Gls)
1978–1981	Mohammedan SC		
1981–1983	East Bengal FC		
1983–1984	Mohammedan SC		
1984–1991	Mohun Bagan SG		

International career
- India
- * Club domestic league appearances and goals

Victor Amalraj (born 16 December 1958) is an Indian former footballer who played for Mohammedan SC and East Bengal FC, serving as the former's captain during the 1983 Bangladesh President's Gold Cup.

== Early life and career ==
Amalraj was originally from Ammuguda and his elder brother John Victor was also a footballer. He played midfielder for 14 years for two Kolkata clubs from 1978 to 1991: East Bengal FC and Mohammedan SC. He eventually became the Indian football captain as well as the captain of three Kolkata clubs including the two he previously played for and Mohun Bagan Super Giant. During his time at Mohammedan SC, he had played for six seasons and scored twenty goals. He represented West Bengal at the Santosh Trophy. He joined the FCI in 1980 under the sports quota and remained a part of the organization for 15 years. He played for India at the 1981 Pyongyang Tournament, the 1983 pre-Olympic tournament and led India in the 1983 Bangladesh President's Gold Cup, but he had missed the selection for the 1982 Asian Games held in Delhi. He had also represented India at the Nehru Cup.

From 2003 to 2008, he was the coach of the Andhra Pradesh football team. From 2007 to 2009, he was elected as an executive committee member of the Hyderabad Cricket Association. In 2014, Amalraj managed the cricket team playing for the Ranji Trophy. In 2019, he was awarded the Shan-E-Mohammedan by Mohammedan SC, an award which his brother won in 2012.

== Personal life ==
His wife Edna had passed away on 11 July 2026 due to cancer.

== In other media ==
An autobiography titled Midfield Maestro was co-written by him and sports journalist Abhijit Sen Gupta, who previously worked for The Hindu Group for thirty-five years and contains a forward by VVS Laxman. Telangana IT secretary Jayesh Ranjan attended the launch event of the book, which was held on 21 August 2022.
