= Alwal railway station =

Railway station in Secunderabad, India

Alwal
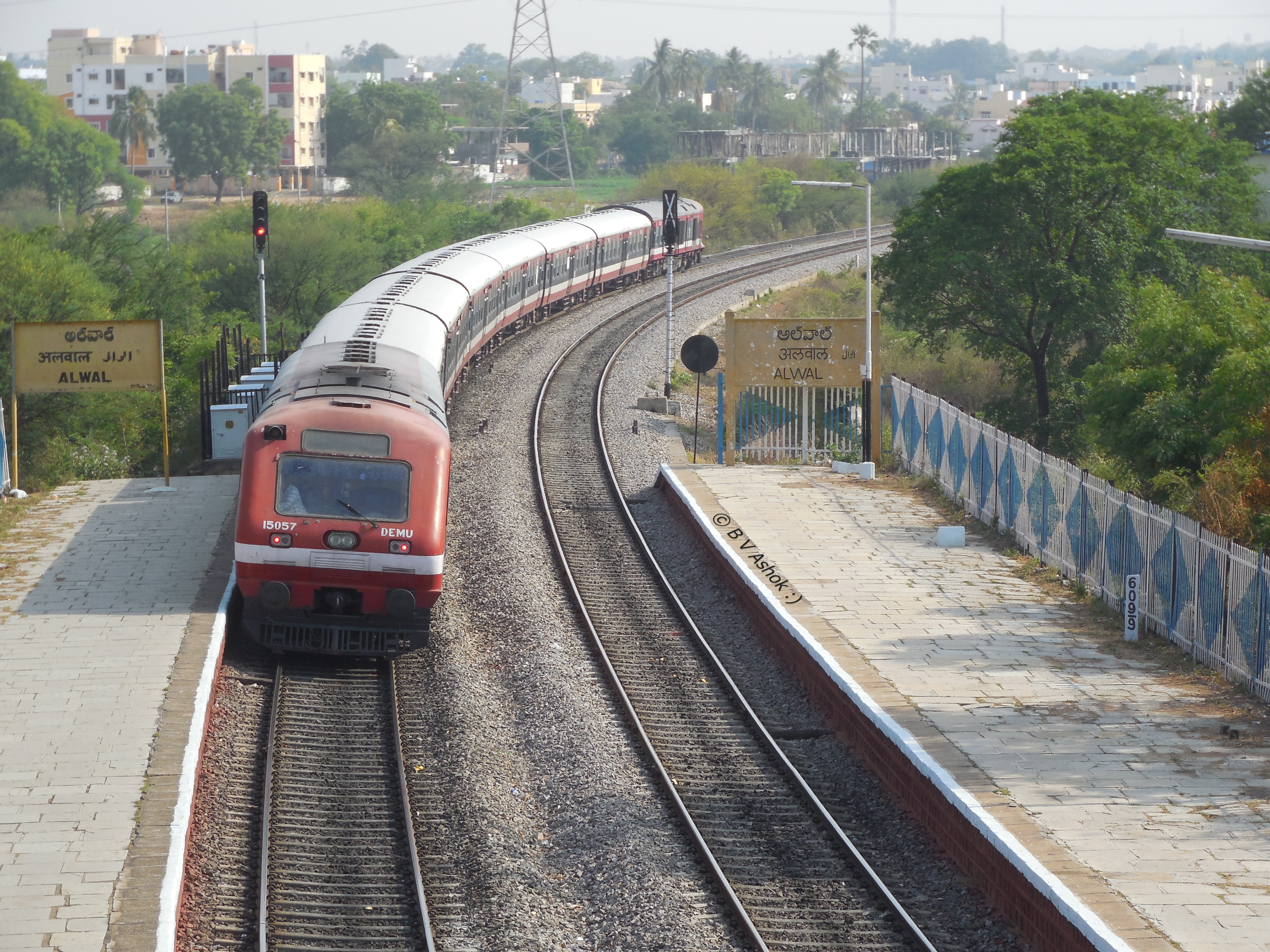
- Secunderabad - Manoharabad DEMU at Alwal Railway station in 2013

General information
- Location: Alwal; Hyderabad; India
- Coordinates: 17.5060°N 78.5144°E
- System: Indian Railways and Hyderabad MMTS station
- Owner: Indian Railways
- Operator: South Central Railway
- Lines: Hyderabad Multi-Modal Transport System; Secunderabad–Bolarum route (SB Line)
- Platforms: 2
- Tracks: 2

Other information
- Station code: ALW
Location

Alwal railway station is a railway station in South Central Railway zone, located in Alwal, a suburb of Secunderabad. The station code is ALW and it has two platforms.

This station serves Alwal, Old Alwal, Venkatapuram, Army Sub Area, Suchitra, and few other nearby areas. Alwal railway station lies between Secunderabad and Medchal station.

This part of the town is connected with Secunderabad which is 8 kilometres (5.0 mi) away. TSRTC connects various part of Alwal, Venkatapuram and Old-Alwal through various bus routes.

== Lines ==
- Hyderabad Multi-Modal Transport System
- Secunderabad–Bolarum route (SB Line)
