= Dayanandnagar railway station =

Railway station in Hyderabad, India

Dayanandnagar
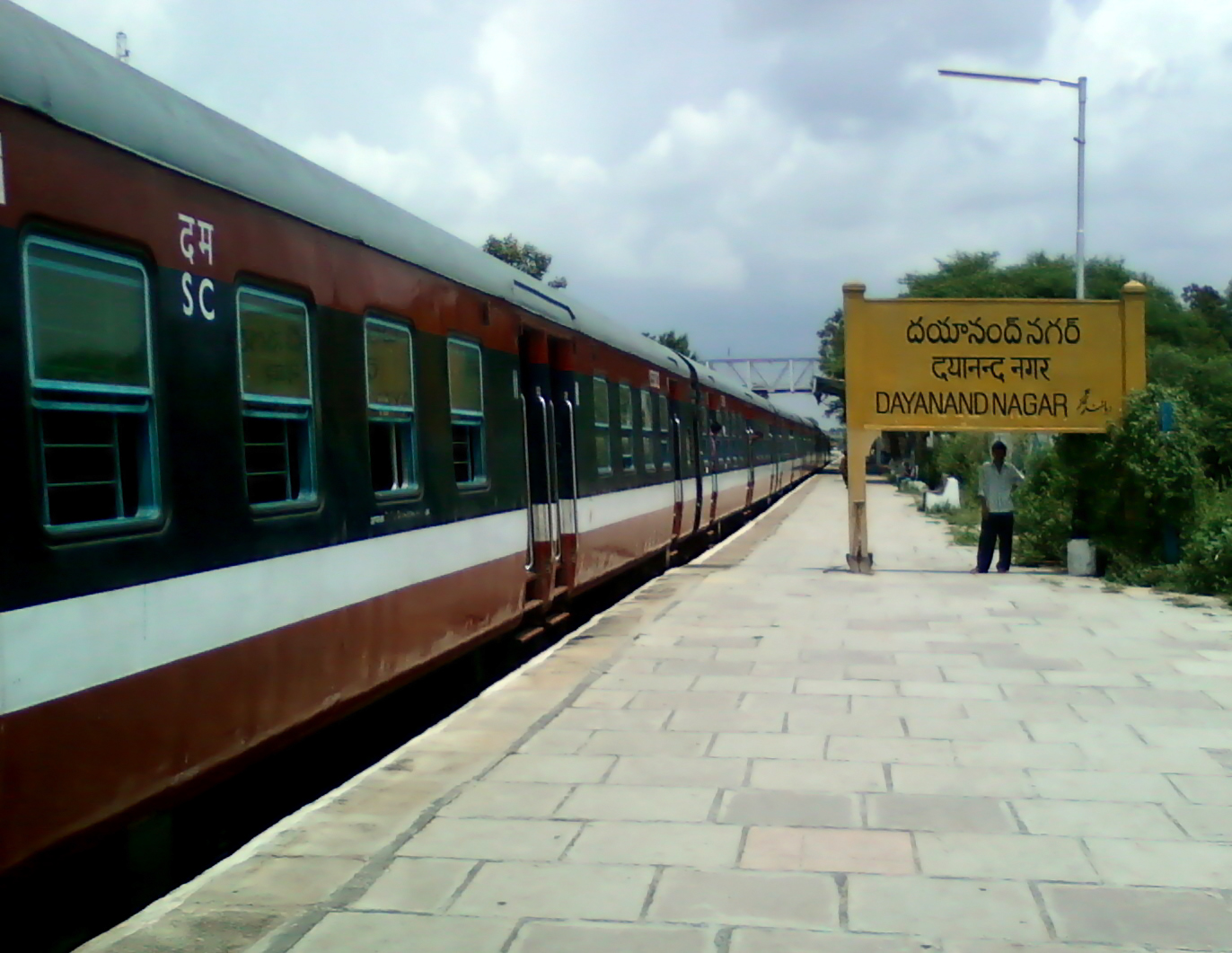
- (Medchal–Falaknuma) DEMU Local at Dayanandnagar

General information
- Coordinates: 17.360°N 78.492°E
- System: Indian Railways and Hyderabad MMTS station
Location

Dayanandnagar railway station is a railway station in New Safilguda, Malkajgiri, Telangana, India. Localities like Dayanandnagar, Radhakrishna(RK)Nagar, Uttam Nagar, Goutham nagar are accessible from this station. The station is used by several people for their morning walks or jogs.

== Lines ==
- Hyderabad Multi-Modal Transport System
  - Secunderabad–Bolarum route (SB Line)
