= Cavalry Barracks railway station =

Railway station in Hyderabad, Telangana, India

Cavalry Barracks
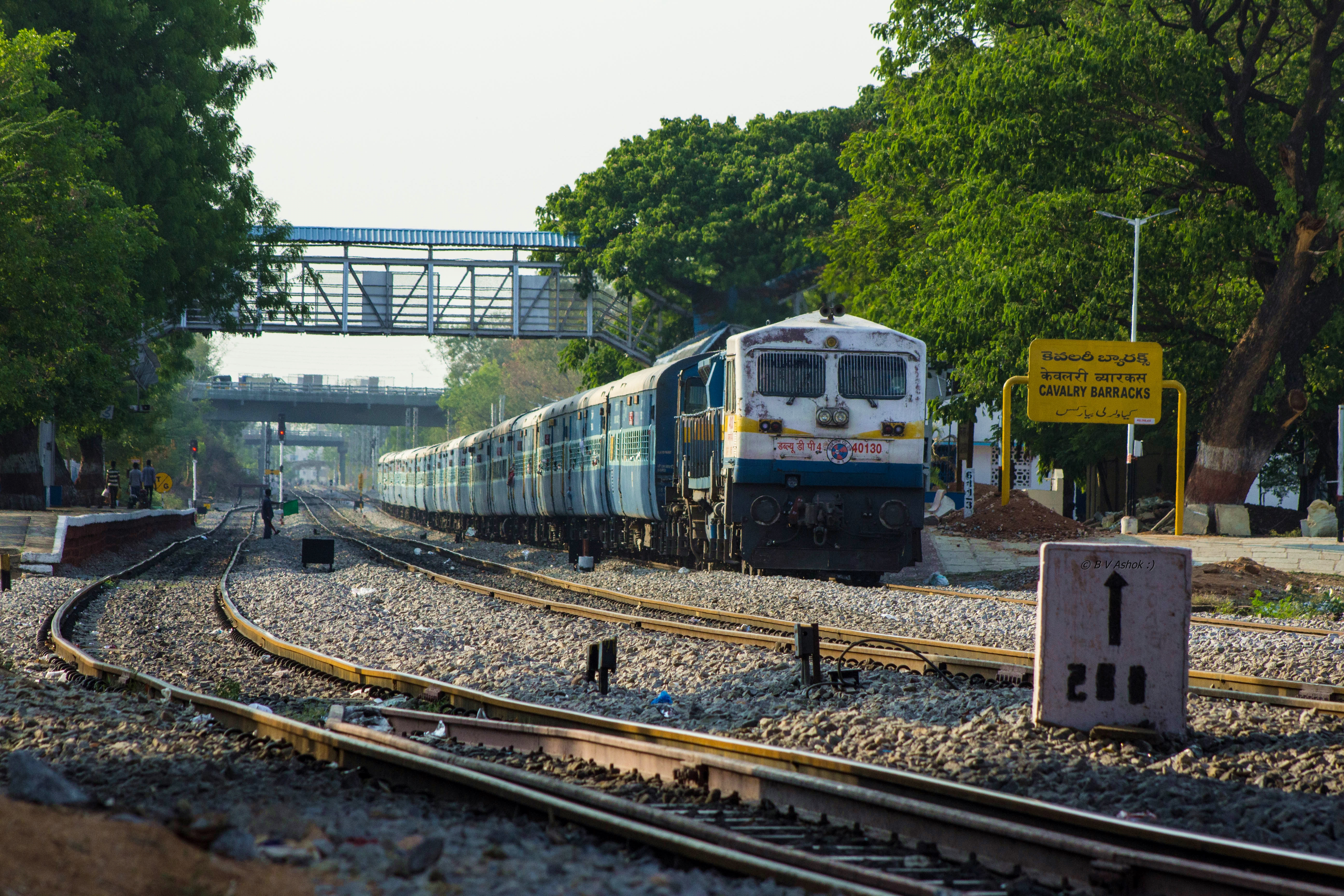
- Amaravati - Tirupati SF Express at Cavalry Barracks railway station

General information
- Location: Bolarum, Hyderabad 500010; Telangana; India
- Coordinates: 17°29′43.16″N 78°31′8.35″E
- System: Indian Railways and Hyderabad MMTS station
- Owner: Indian Railways
- Operator: South Central Railways
- Line: Secunderabad–Bolarum line
- Platforms: 3
- Train operators: Indian Railways

Other information
- Station code: CVB
Location
- Location within Hyderabad Location within Telangana Location within India

Cavalry Barracks is a railway station in Hyderabad, India, located on the Manmad- Secunderabad section of the South Central Railway. The cantonment area is accessible from this station.

== Lines ==
- Hyderabad Multi-Modal Transport System
- Secunderabad–Bolarum route

Code	Name	km
CVB	Cavalry Barracks	0
ALW	Alwal	1
AMQ	Ammuguda	1
AMGU	Ammuguda C	1
RKO	Ramakistapuram	2
BDNH	Bhudevi Nagar	2
NRDMT	Neredmet	3
BOZ	Bolarum Bazaar	3
DYE	Dayanand Nagar	4
SFX	Safilguda	4
BMO	Bolarum	5
MJF	Malkajgiri	5
MLY	Moula Ali	6
LGDH	Lalaguda Gate	6
STPD	Sitafalmandi	7
SC	Secunderabad	8
