= Alwal =

Alwal Old Alwal
- Neighbourhood
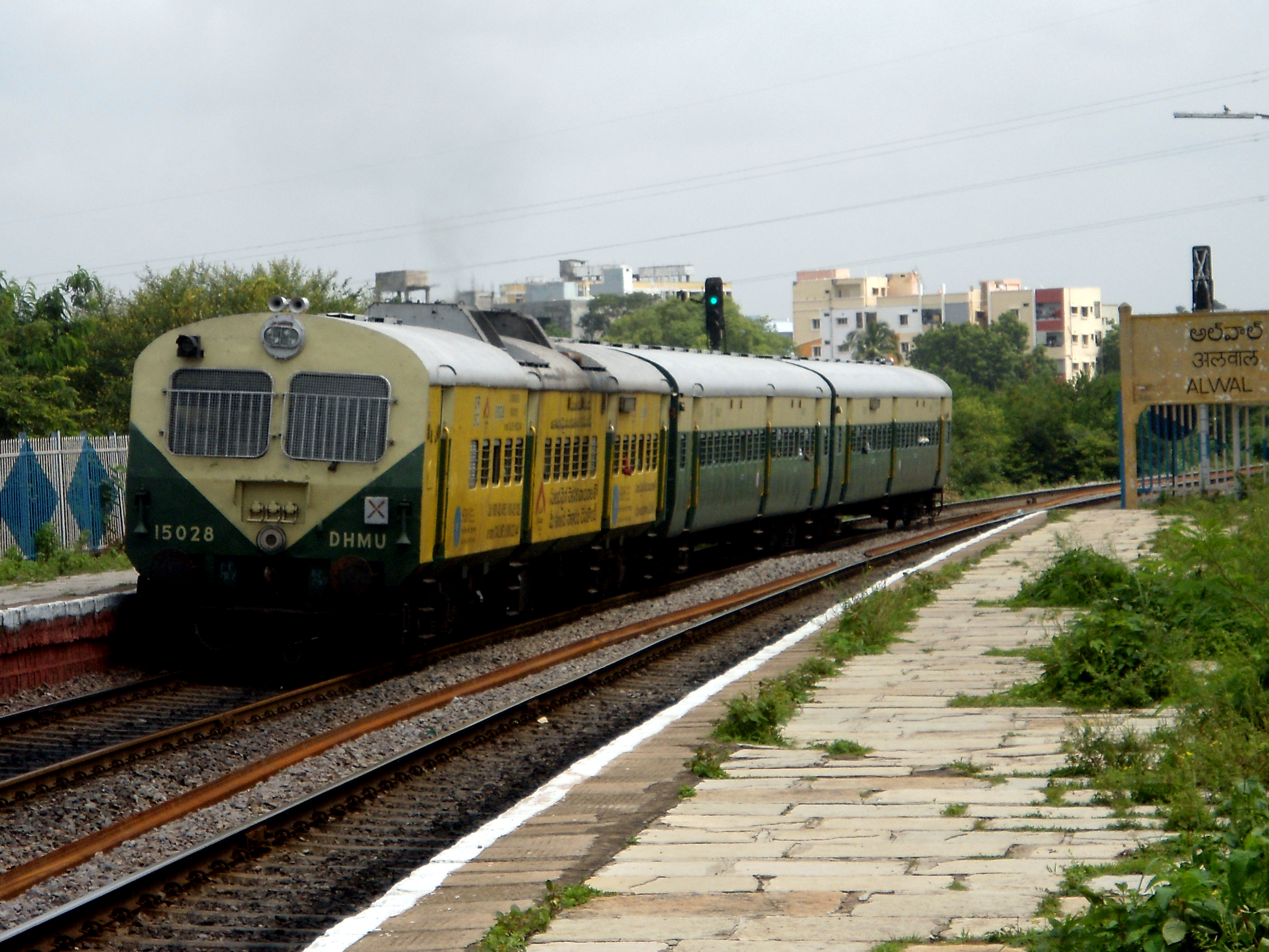
- Medchal bound DEMU at Alwal Railway Station

- Location in Hyderabad, India
- Coordinates: 17.503°N 78.507°E
- Country: India
- State: Telangana
- District: Medchal-Malkajgiri district
- City: Secunderabad

Government
  - Body: GHMC

Population
  - Total: 240,000

Languages
  - Official: Telugu
- Time zone: UTC+5:30 (IST)
- PIN: 500010
- Lok Sabha constituency: Malkajgiri
- Vidhan Sabha constituency: Malkajgiri
- Planning agency: GHMC, Hyderabad Metropolitan Development Authority

Alwal is in Hyderabad city, and a suburb of Hyderabad. Earlier, Alwal was a part of Malkajgiri Mandal but in 2006, Alwal Municipality was merged into Malkajgiri Municipal Corporation. After the district bifurcation in 2017, Alwal Municipality became a new Mandal "Alwal Mandal", in Malkajgiri revenue division, with Alwal as the Mandal Headquarters. It was a part of Ranga Reddy district before the re-organisation of districts in the state. It was a municipality prior to its merger into the Greater Hyderabad Municipal Corporation.

== History ==
Alwal (Circle No.:27, Zone: Kukatpally) is under Hyderabad Municipal Corporation. Alwal is considered one of the safest places in the Secunderabad area because it is surrounded by the Indian Army Corps of EME, Army Quarters and Rashtrapati Nilayam. Alwal was a prime area under the British Cantonment. It is home to a historic Venkateswara temple, which is located near the Alwal municipal office and is more than 400 years old. Gundam Balaji Temple is also located in this temple premises, which is stated to be 850 years old. There is a temple in the style of the Lotus Temple, Delhi. This 'Guruvayurappan Temple' is maintained by the army and is located near the Lal Bazar Ambedkar Statue circle. Thota Muthyalamma Temple is 200 meters from the Alwal Rythu Bazaar bridge. Hyderabad's oldest 'Ayyappa Temple' is 1.5 km (0.93 mi) from the Alwal Rythu Bazaar bridge. In the Shiva Parvathi sub-temple, Shiva and Parvati are in 'Vigraha' form, unlike the more common 'Linga' form.

Alwal was a part of Jagir of Sir Kishen Pershad, Prime Minister of Nizam, during the 1920s. Sir Kishen Pershad used to have his ‘Devdi’ (palace) at Alwal and used to spend time here during summer.

== Transport ==
Alwal is 8 km (5.0 mi) away from Secunderabad Railway station and 12 km (7.5 mi) away from Begumpet Airport and almost 50 km (31 mi) from Rajiv Gandhi International Airport.

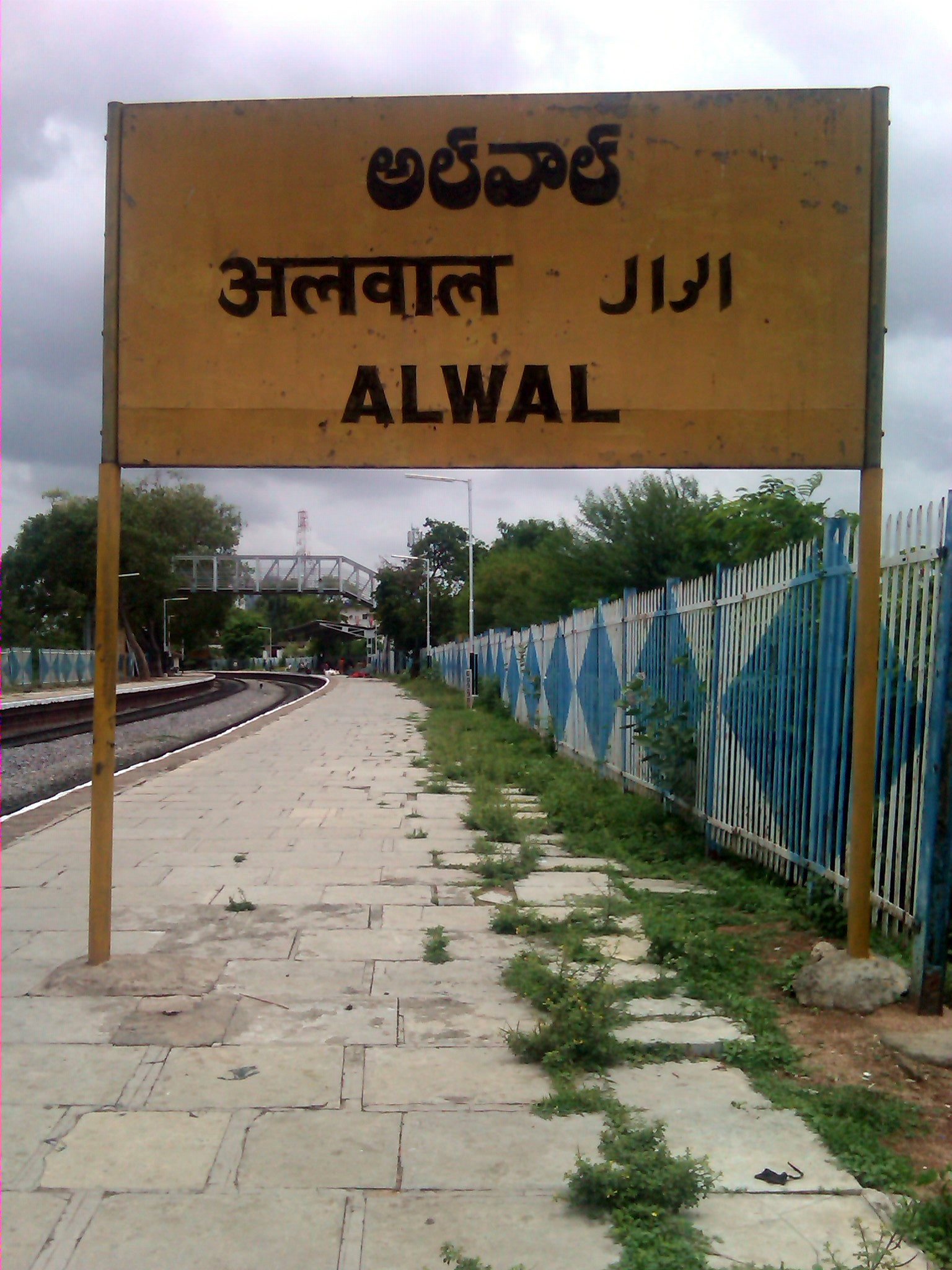
Alwal Railway Station

Public transport include, city buses operated by TSRTC and MMTS rail services from the Alwal railway station called as Alwal Railway Station.

== Notable people in Alwal ==
- Chintala Venkat Reddy is an organic farmer and Padma Shri 2020 Award Winner
- Shyam Benegal, director and screenwriter
- B. Narsing Rao, Acclaimed Film Director
- Gaddar, Telugu balladeer and Nandi Award for Best Male Playback Singer 2011
- Banda Karthika Reddy, Ex-Mayor
- Rathna Shekar Reddy, Actor in Indian Films and Founder of Samahaara Acting Theater

== Assembly Constituency ==
Alwal falls under Malkajgiri Assembly constituency. Alwal circle consists of three divisions: Alwal, Macha Bollaram and Venkatapuram. Alwal is a small place in India and can be easily explored within a day. The place is famous for Lord Shiva and Lord Venkateshwara temples. The famous alwal 'Jatara' happens during the month of December giving a visual and gastronomic treat to its residents.
