= Malkajgiri Junction railway station =

Railway station in Hyderabad, Telangana, India

Malkajgiri Junction
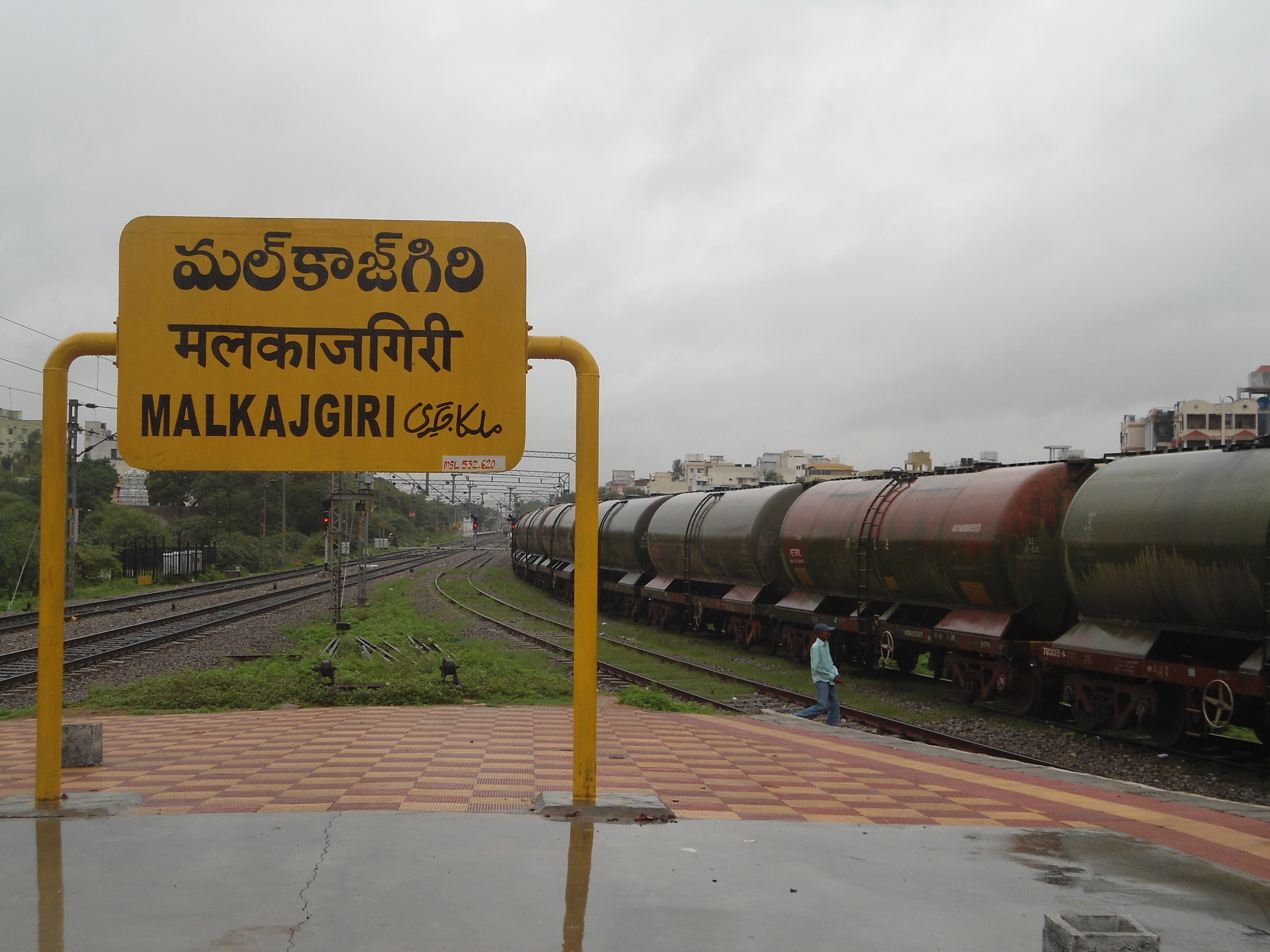
- Malkajgiri Junction railway station

General information
- Location: Malkajgiri, Telangana; India
- Coordinates: 17.366°N 78.476°E
- Elevation: 534 ft (163 m)
- System: Indian Railways and Hyderabad MMTS station
- Owner: Indian Railways
- Operator: South Central Railway zone
- Lines: Secunderabad–Bolarum route (SB Line); Malkajgiri–Moula Ali–Kazipet; Kacheguda–Sitaphalmandi–Malkajgiri–Moula Ali
- Platforms: 3
- Tracks: 4

Construction
- Structure type: At grade
- Parking: Available

Other information
- Status: Functioning
- Station code: MJF
- Zone(s): South Central Railway
- Division(s): Hyderabad

History
- Former names: Nizam's Guaranteed State Railway
Location
- Location within Telangana Location within India

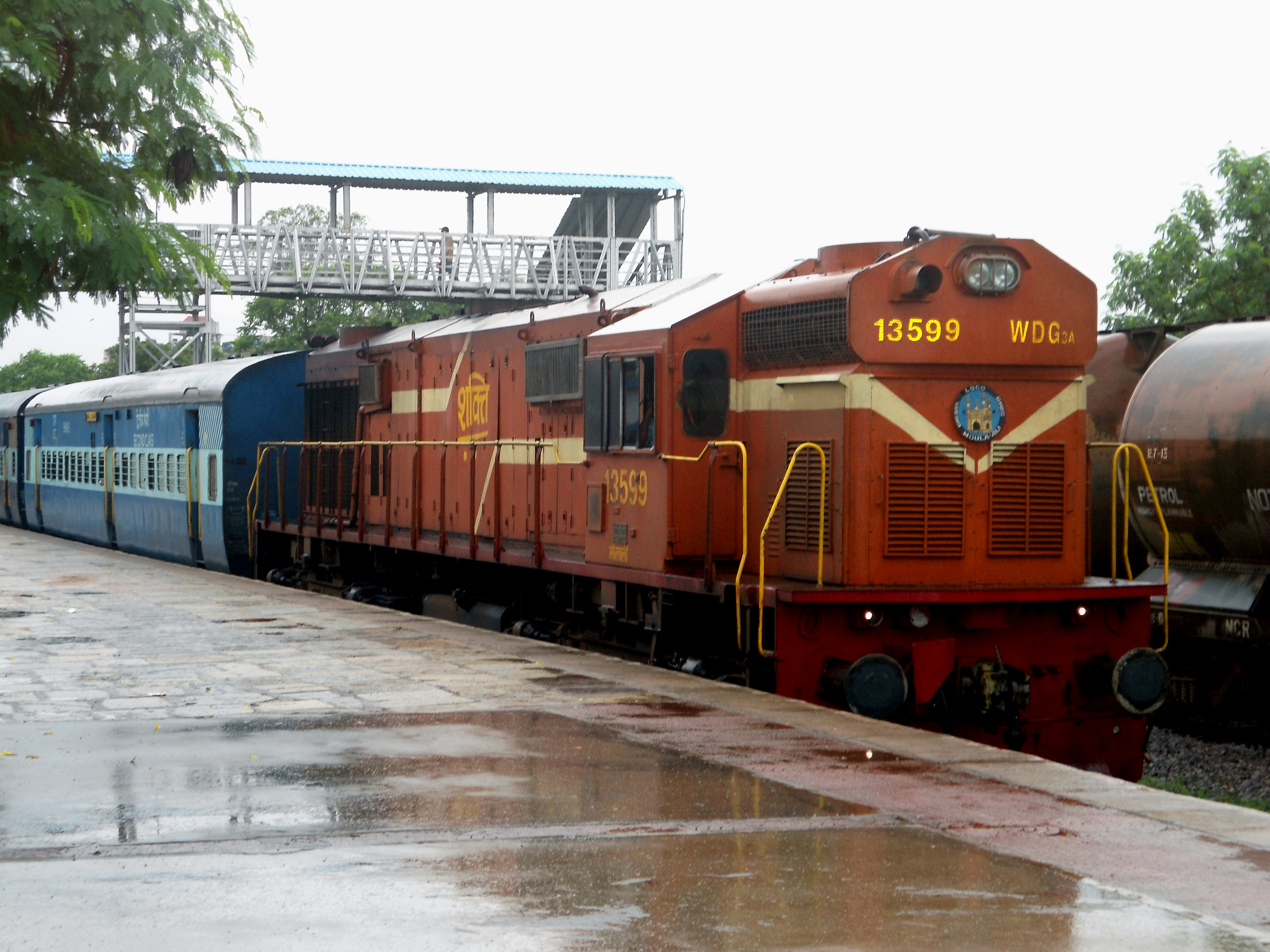
NZB–Kacheguda Passenger with WDG-3A loco at Malkajgiri railway station

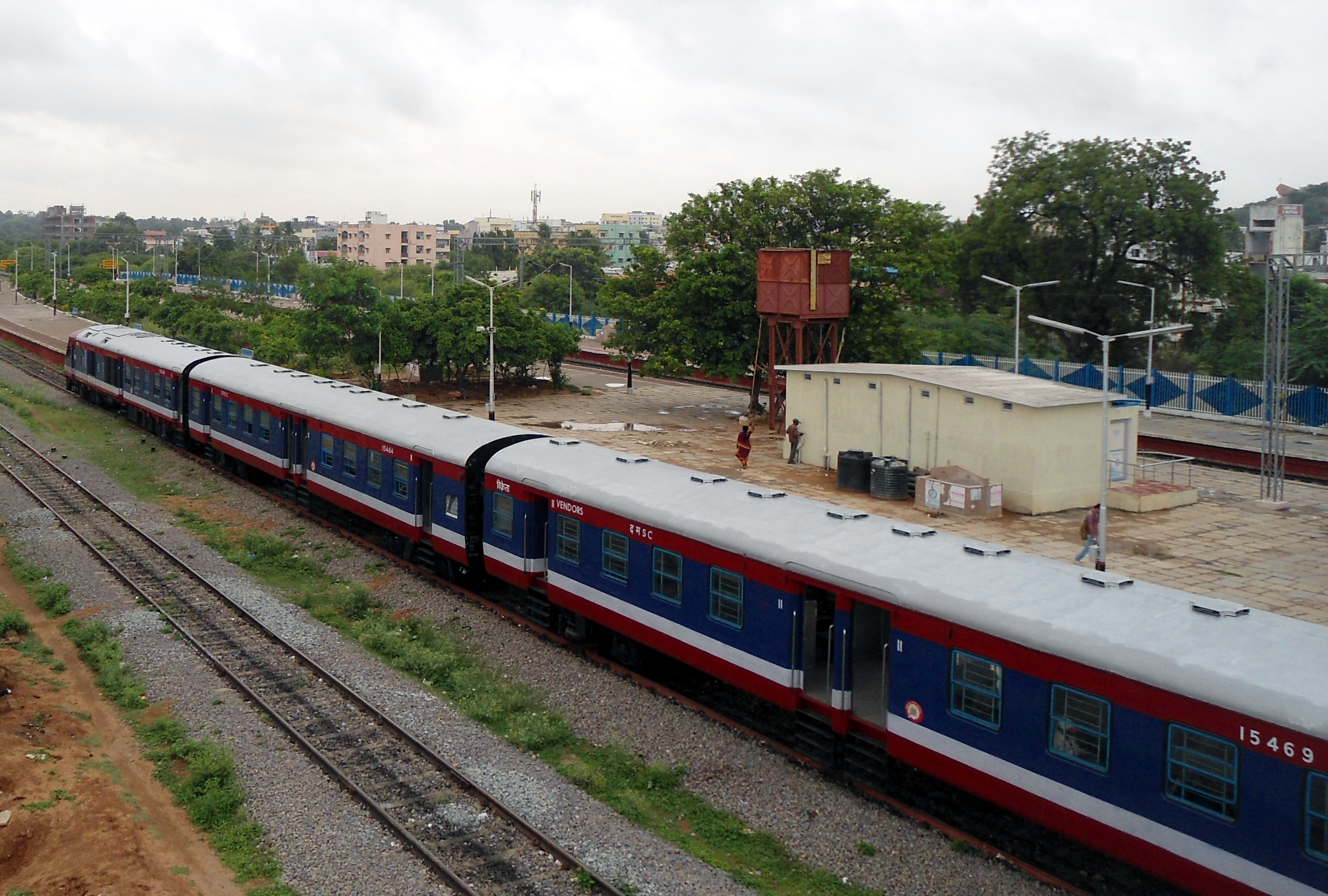
KCG–Miryalguda DEMU Passenger train at Malkajgiri railway station

Malkajgiri Junction railway station (station code: MJF) is a fifth grade non-suburban (NSG–5) category Indian railway station in Hyderabad railway division of South Central Railway zone. It is located in Hyderabad of the Indian state of Telangana. It was selected as one of the 21 stations to be developed under Amrit Bharat Stations scheme.

== Services ==
Malkajgiri railway station is well served with some passenger trains that operate on Secunderabad–Manmad line. Even a couple of Express trains halt here. They are:

- Kacheguda–Narker Express
- Krishna Express There is also a proposal to halt four more express trains in this station due to increasing demands. The Seetaphalmandi–Malkajgiri chord line which was proposed was commenced its services from 2007.

== Lines ==
- Hyderabad Multi-Modal Transport System
- Secunderabad–Bolarum route (SB Line)

== Future ==
Due to a rapid rise in rail transport in Hyderabad, the Railway Board (India) had decided of a fourth railway terminal in addition to the existing ones at Secunderabad railway station, Kacheguda railway station and Hyderabad railway station. The board would decide after the proposals of Secunderabad and Hyderabad divisions. The Hyderabad division proposed the Malkajgiri railway station as the fourth rail terminal in Hyderabad. Even if the Railway Board does not consider the proposal of the Hyderabad division's bid for Malkajgiri as the fourth terminal, passengers of the division can benefit since the existing station at Malkajgiri willsoon be transformed into a passenger terminal at an estimated cost of Rs. 1 crore. Besides proposing the Malkajgiri station for the fourth terminal, the board is determined to transform the station into a passenger terminal at an estimated cost of Rs. 1 crore. Once the station transforms into a terminus, trains bound to Delhi from Bangalore and Mumbai could pass through the station without touching Secunderabad.

== See also ==
- Secunderabad railway station
- South Central Railway
- Hyderabad Multi-Modal Transport System
