= Safilguda railway station =

Railway station in India

Safilguda
- Safilguda railway station view at Chanikyapuri, New Safilguda, Neredmet.

General information
- Location: Hyderabad - 500047; Secunderabad; India
- Coordinates: 17.4617161°N 78.5330967°E
- Elevation: 534 m (1,752 ft)
- System: Indian Railways and Hyderabad MMTS station
- Owner: Indian Railways
- Operator: South Central Railway zone
- Line: Secunderabad–Bolarum line
- Platforms: 2
- Tracks: 2

Construction
- Structure type: On Ground
- Parking: Yes

Other information
- Status: Functioning
- Station code: SFX
- Zone(s): South Central Railway zone
- Division(s): Hyderabad
Location
- Location within Hyderabad Location within India

Safilguda railway station (station code:SFX) is a railway station in Hyderabad, Telangana, India. Localities including Safilguda, Old Neredmet and Anandbagh are accessible from this station.

== Lines ==
- Hyderabad Multi-Modal Transport System
  - Secunderabad–Bolarum (BS Line)
