= Secunderabad–Bolarum route =

Secunderabad–Bolarum Line

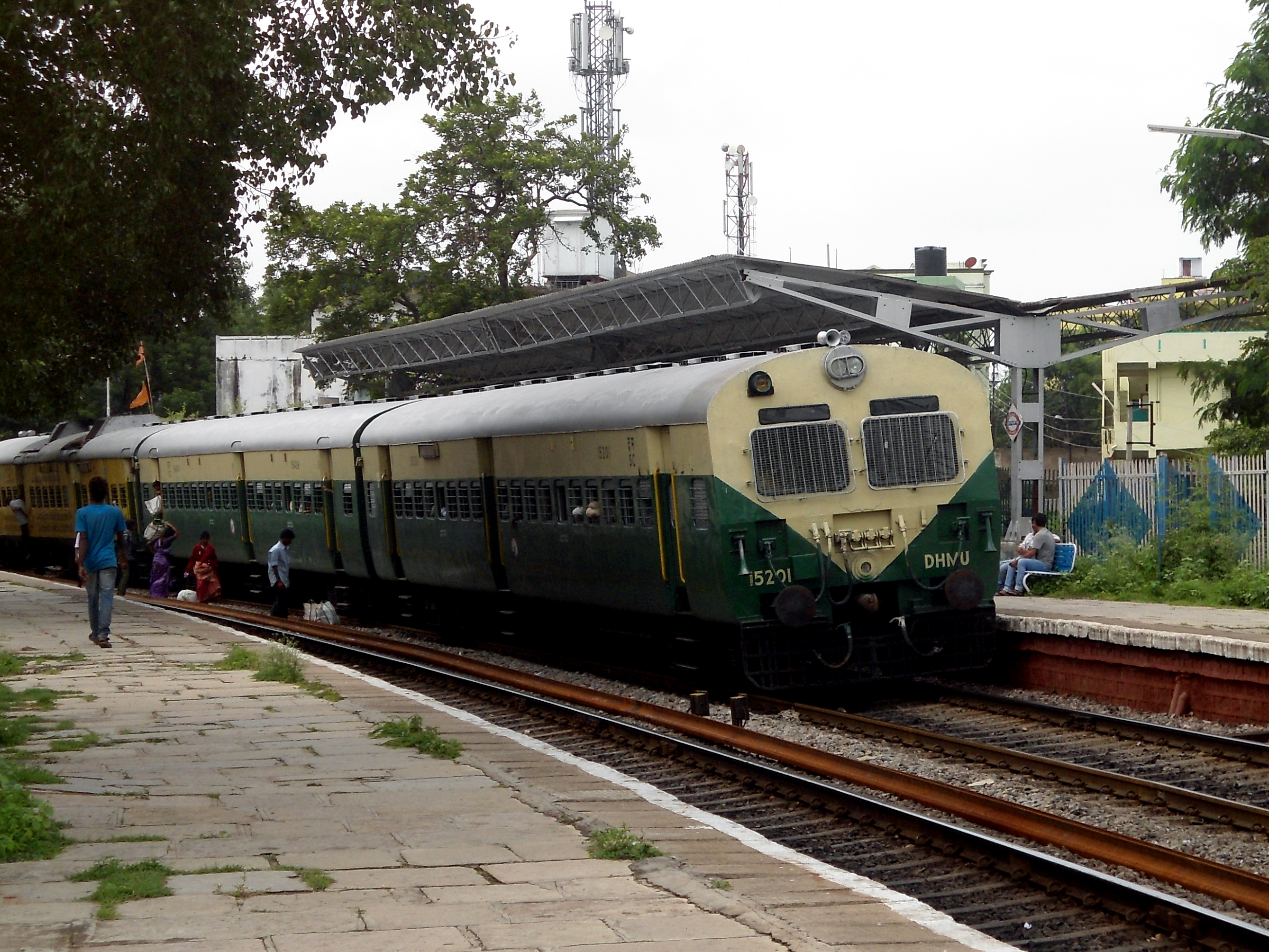
- (SC-Medchal) DHMU at Alwal Railway Station

Overview
- Owner: Government of Telangana; Indian Railways
- Termini: Secunderabad; Bolarum
- Stations: 11

Service
- Type: Rapid transit
- System: Hyderabad Multi-Modal Transport System
- Operator: South Central Railway

History
- Opened: 2003

Technical
- Number of tracks: 2
- Character: Surface
- Track gauge: 1,676 mm (5 ft 6 in) Broad Gauge
- Electrification: Secundrabad to Safilguda 25 kV 50 Hz AC current, rest under electrification
Route map
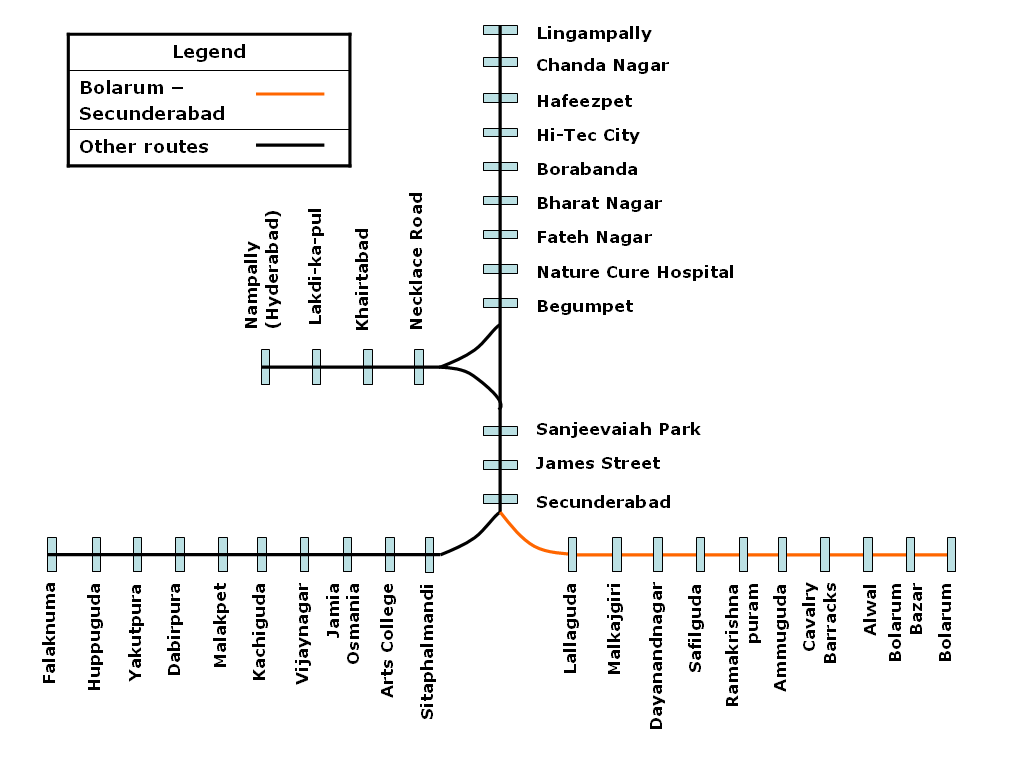

The Secunderabad–Bolarum (abbr. SB) is a suburban rail service of the Multi-Modal Transport System of Hyderabad, India. Spanning 11 stations, it runs between Secunderabad and Bolarum 5 times a day.

== History ==
The Secunderabad–Bolarum route is one of the oldest suburban rail in the city of Hyderabad, established by Nizam's Guaranteed State Railway. Initially, it was a metre-gauge track but was later converted into broad-gauge.

== Stations ==
Secunderabad–Bolarum
Station Code	Station Name	Connections
SC	Secunderabad	Secunderabad East metro station, Secunderabad West metro station
LGDH	Lallaguda	
MJF	Malkajgiri	
DYE	Dayanandnagar	
SFX	Safilguda	
RKO	Ramakrishnapuram	
AMQ	Ammuguda	
CVW	Cavalry Barracks	
ALW	Alwal	
BOZ	Bolarum Bazar	
BMO	Bolarum	

== MMTS route ==
Secunderabad–Bolarum route is scheduled to take off as a part of the phase 2 of the Hyderabad Multi-Modal Transport System in December 2018., however was delayed due to paucity of funds. The work of the section is nearing to completion in February 2020..Finally, 13 MMTS Services along 2 routes under the MMTS phase 2 was inaugurated on 8th april 2023 on Secunderabad medchal & Falaknuma Umdanagar routes by PM Narendra Modi.

== Electrification ==
Railway electrification system of the 13 km long route was completed in 2018 by South Central Railway.

== Image gallery ==
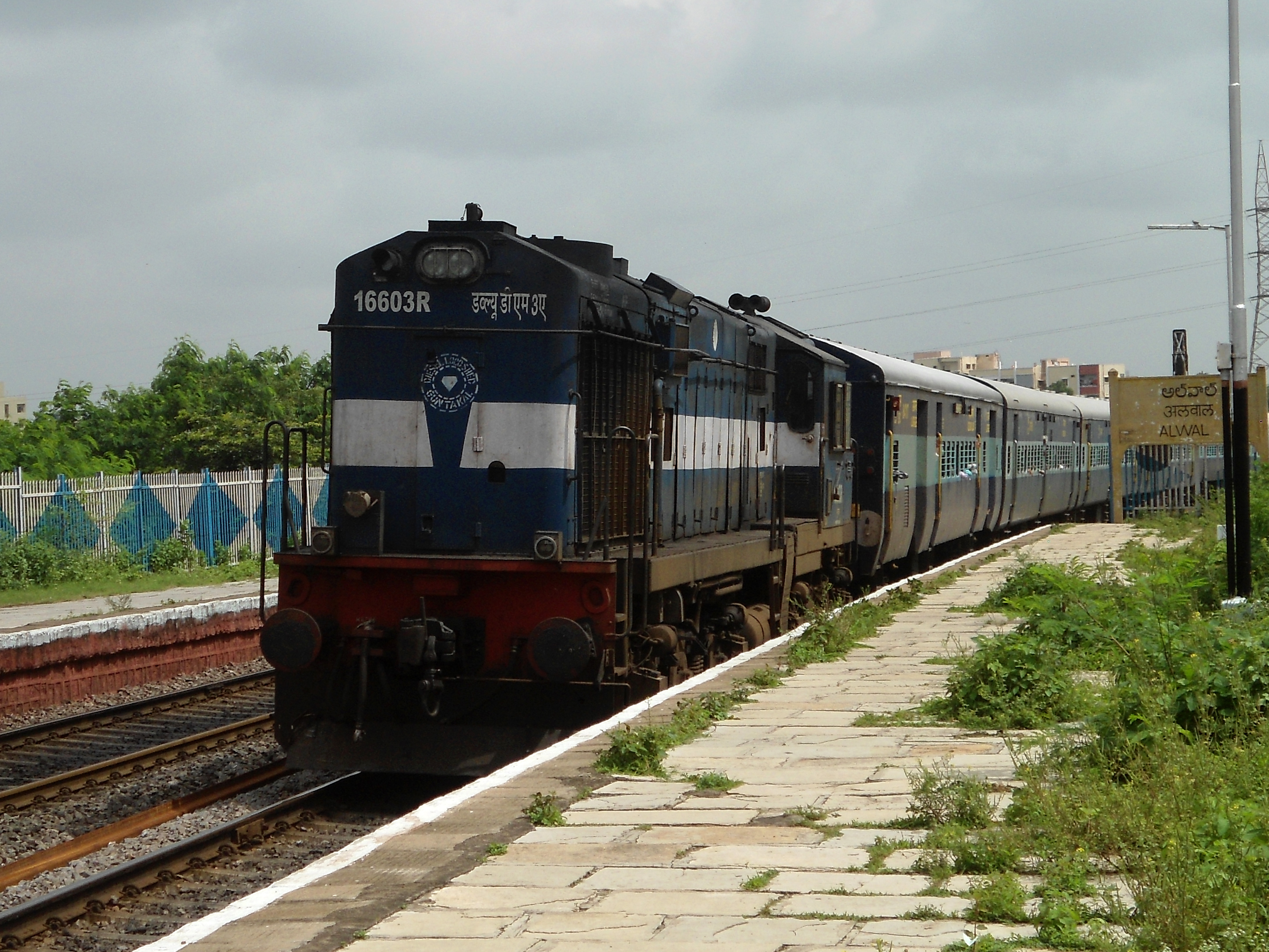
Bodhan-MBNR Passenger with WDM3A loco at Alwal Railway Station

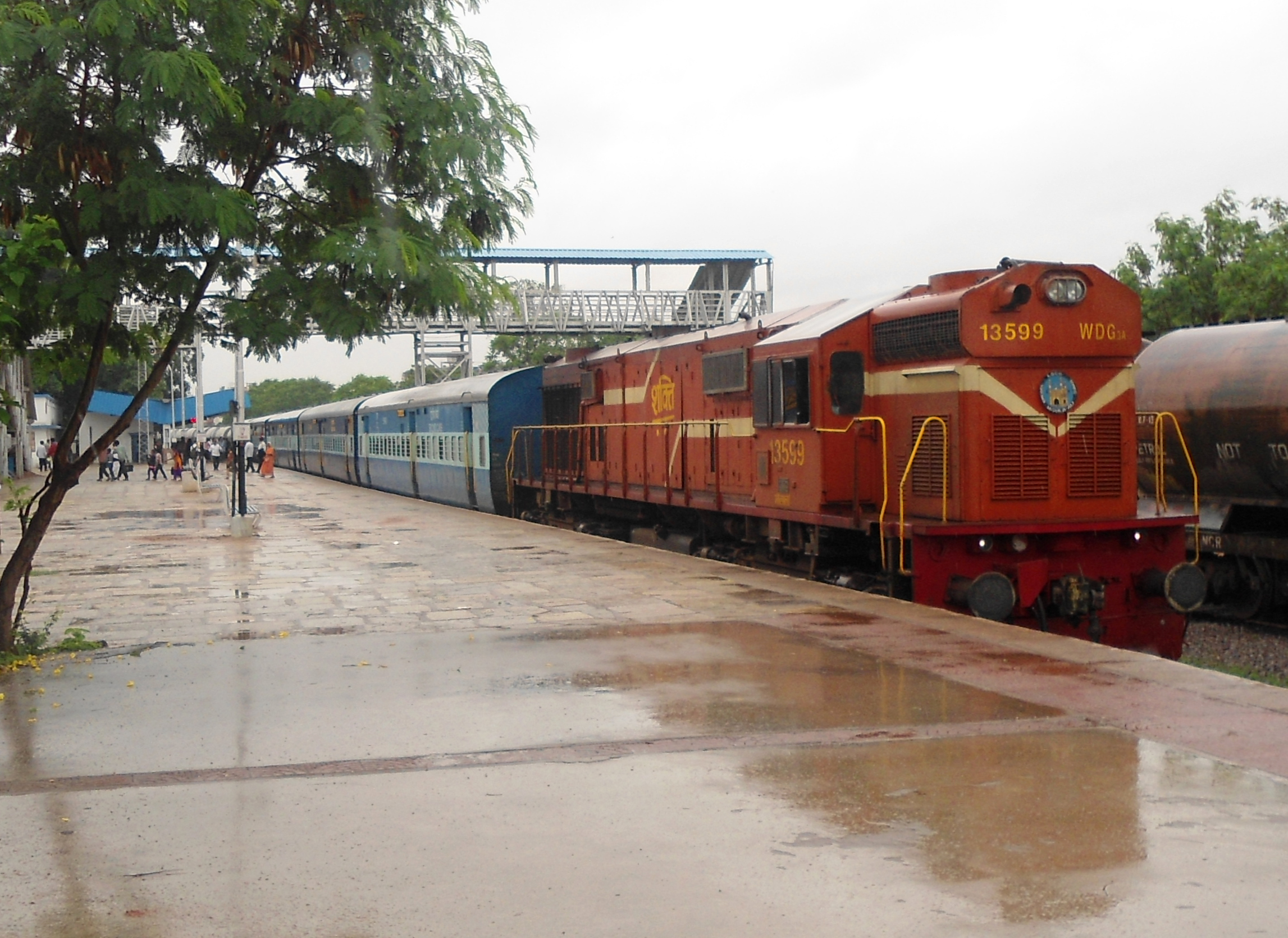
NZB-Kacheguda Passenger with WDG-3A loco at Malkajgiri Railway Station

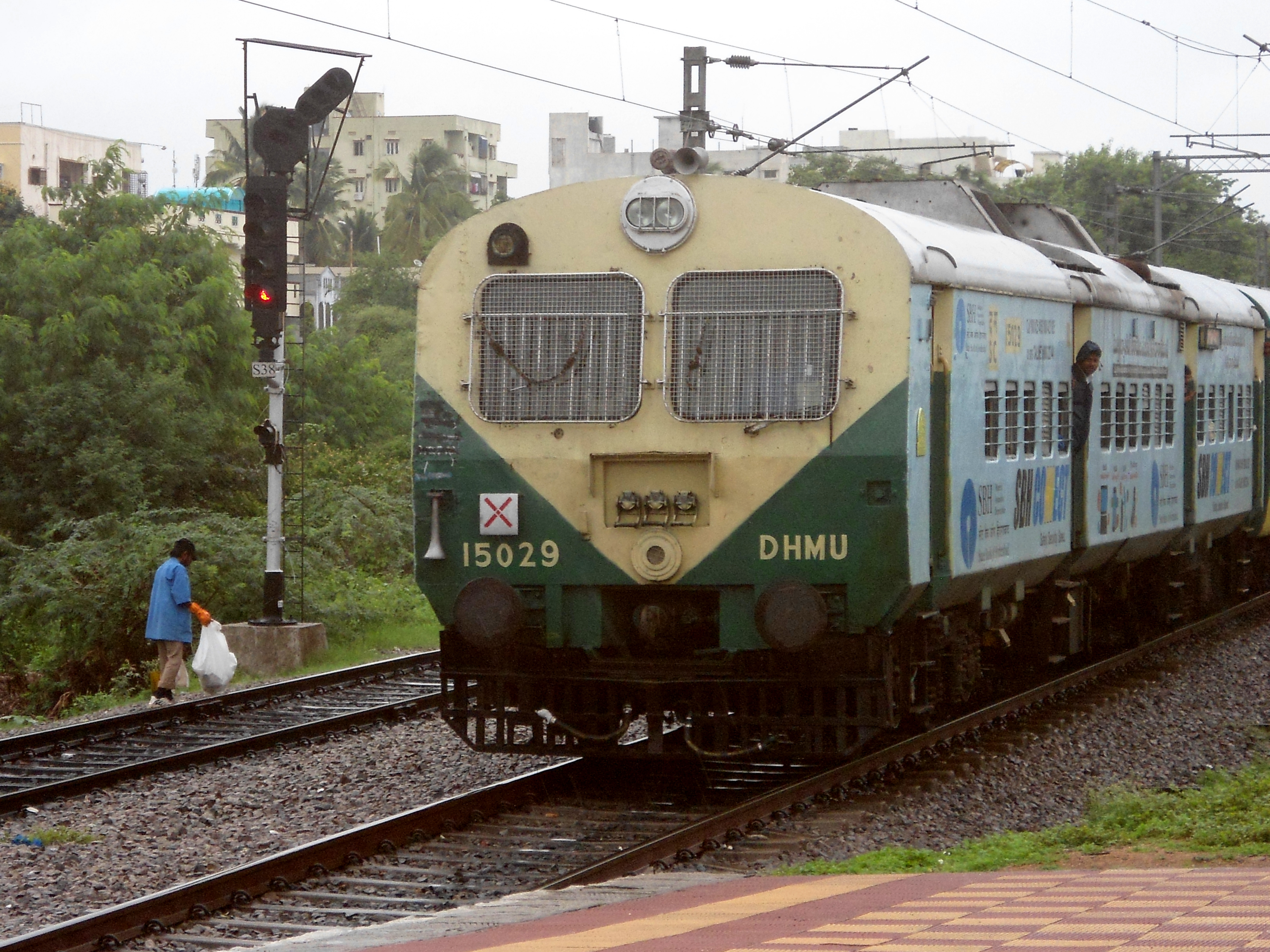
(Manoharabad-SC) DHMU at Malkajgiri Railway Station

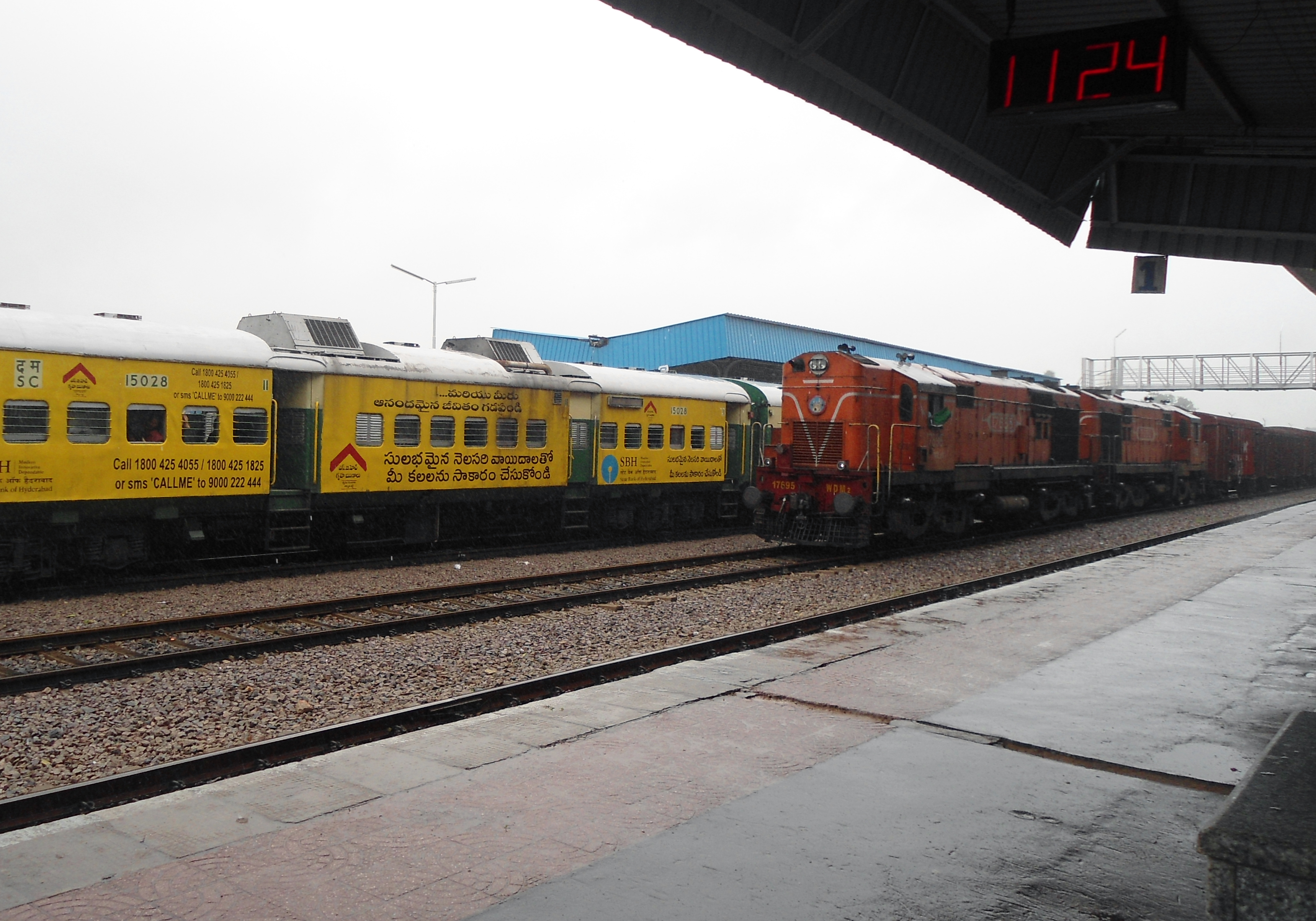
(SC-Medchal) Local and Freight train at Bolarum Railway Station
