= Bolarum railway station =

Railway station in Secunderabad, India

Bolarum
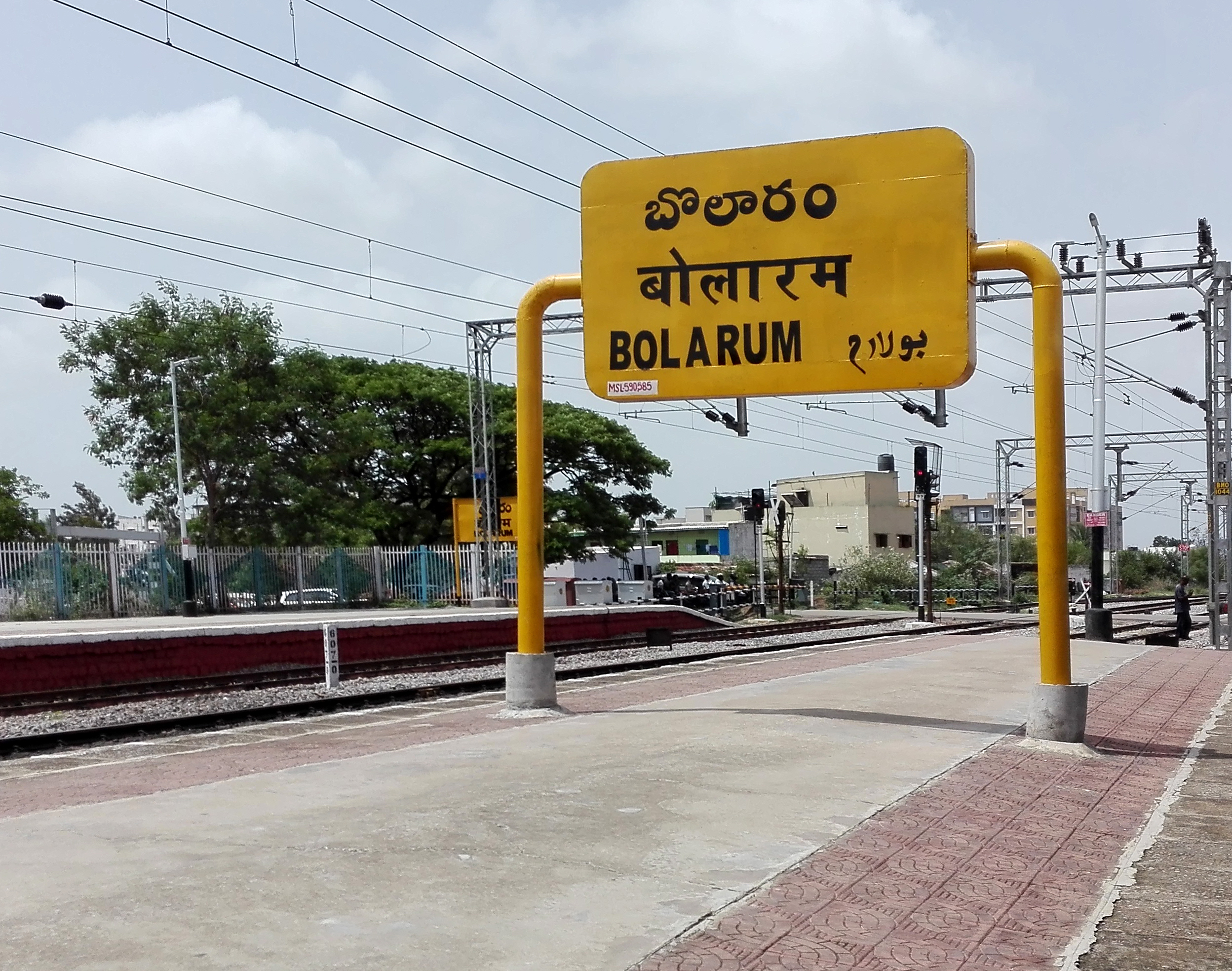
- View of Bolarum railway station South end

General information
- Location: Bolarum, Hyderabad, Telangana, India
- Coordinates: 17.53369°N 78.515275°E
- Elevation: 535.60 metres (1,757.2 ft)
- System: Indian Railways and Hyderabad MMTS station
- Owner: Indian Railways
- Operator: South Central Railway zone
- Line: Secunderabad–Manmad
- Platforms: 3
- Tracks: 5
- Connections: Bus stand

Construction
- Structure type: At grade

Other information
- Status: Functioning
- Station code: BMO
- Zone(s): South Central Railway
- Division(s): Secunderabad
Location
- Location within Hyderabad Location within Telangana Location within India

Bolarum railway station (station code: BMO) is a halt-3 (HG–3) category Indian railway station in Hyderabad railway division of South Central Railway zone. It is an Indian Railways station in Hyderabad, situated in the Indian state of Telangana.

== Lines ==
- Secunderabad–Manmad line
- Bolarum–Secunderabad route (Hyderabad Multi-Modal Transport System)
