= Ammuguda railway station =

Railway station in Hyderabad, India

Ammuguda
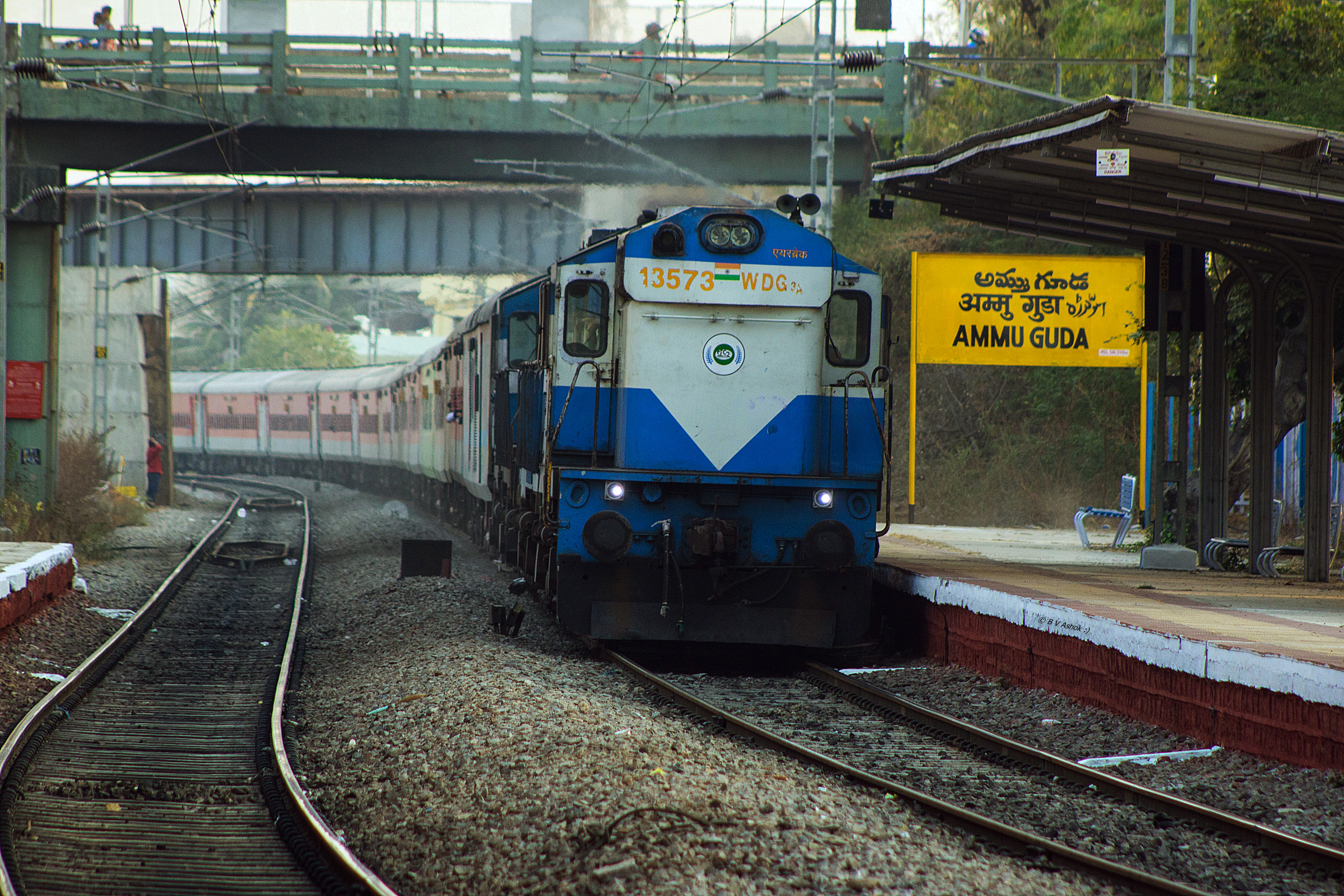
- Jaipur Hyderabad Special at Ammuguda railway station

General information
- Location: Near Vevekanadanapuram Colony, Neredmet, Secunderabad, Telangana; India
- Coordinates: 17.487032°N 78.526907°E
- Elevation: 535.60 metres (1,757.2 ft)
- System: Indian Railways and Hyderabad MMTS station
- Owner: Indian Railways
- Operator: Hyderabad
- Line: Secunderabad–Bolarum route
- Platforms: 2
- Tracks: 2

Construction
- Structure type: Standard (on-ground station)

Other information
- Status: Functioning
- Station code: AMQ
- Fare zone: South Central Railway zone

History
- Former names: Nizam's Guaranteed State Railway
Location

Ammuguda railway station is a railway station in Hyderabad, Telangana, India located on the Manmad–Kacheguda section of South Central Railway. The station code is AMQ.

The Ammuguda, Neredmet, Ramakrishnapuram localities is accessible from this station. The Ammuguda hillock is close by. The station has 88 trains passing through per day on average.

Famous footballer Victor Amalraj was a regular at this railway station in his playing day and used to live in a nearby locality. Another Olympian footballer Tulasidas Balaram was also a regular to the station in his playing days as he was born and brought up in Ammuguda village.

== Lines ==
- Hyderabad Multi-Modal Transport System
- Secunderabad–Bolarum route (BS Line)
