= Sikh Village =

- neighbourhood
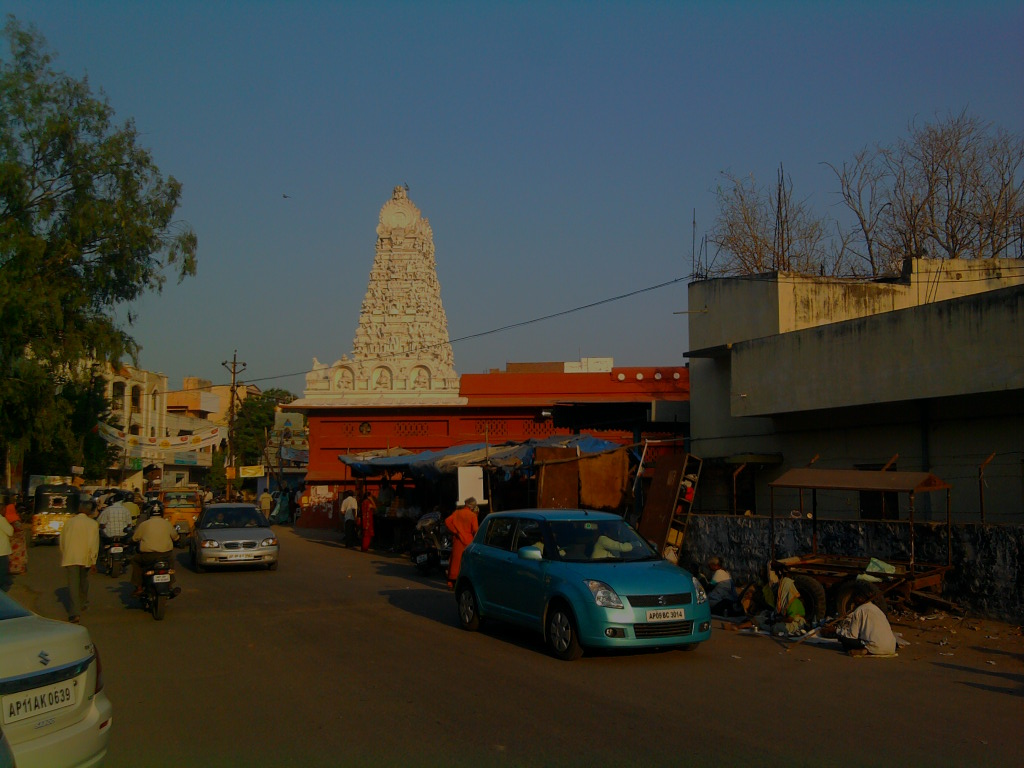
- Tadbund Hanuman temple
- Nickname: Chickthota
- Location in Hyderabad, India
- Coordinates: 17.461654°N 78.487186°E
- Country: India
- State: Telangana
- District: Hyderabad
- Metro: Hyderabad

Government
  - Body: Cantonment Board, Secunderabad

Languages
  - Official: Telugu
- Time zone: UTC+5:30 (IST)
- PIN: 500 009
- Lok Sabha constituency: Secunderabad Lok Sabha constituency
- Vidhan Sabha constituency: Cantonment
- Planning agency: Cantonment Board, Secunderabad

Sikh Village earlier known as Sikhul thota is a small suburb in Secunderabad, India. The name is attributed to some of the Nizam's Sikh troops being settled here a century ago. It is 3 km (1.9 mi) from Paradise Circle and 2 km (1.2 mi) from Bowenpally.

== Landmarks ==
The Tadbund Hanuman temple is located here. It is also the hometown of famous Indian hockey players Mukesh Kumar and Saranjeet Singh. Old Mudfort, an area earlier called Tilleri, is also nearby. Sikh Village is also home to the Dobhi ghat, that was given to local laundry community by the British, more convenient for washing soiled clothing than Hasmathpet lake.

Masthana Hotel is an age-old landmark of Sikh Village and Mudfort. It is close to Trimulgherry, Park View Enclave and the AWHO housing colony. There is a Gurudwara in the vicinity. The key circle areas are Diamond Point Circle, Mastana Hotel Cross. The Diamond Point Hotel is also there in the area.

It has a number of function halls like Imperial Gardens, Jewel Gardens, Bantia Gardens, and Raja Rajeshwari Gardens. A hockey ground is planned in the area.

The wholesale Monda Market was moved to Sikh Village from Secunderabad.

The landscape of Sikh Village was entirely lush green fields of fruits and vegetables, hence the name thota.

== Transport ==
TSRTC 26,26N,26M,26G 26M/V all connect Sikh Village to Secunderabad and other parts of the city.

The closest MMTS Train station is at Secunderabad

== Schools ==
There are several schools in this suburb, including Delhi Public School, Sun Flower School, Sarjus Preschool, and GGS.
