= Karkhana, Secunderabad =

Karkhana
- Secunderabad
- neighbourhood in Telangana, India Karkhana (Telangana) Karkhana (India)
- Coordinates: 17°27′40″N 78°30′05″E
- Country: India
- State: Telangana
- District: Hyderabad District
- City: Secunderabad
- Established: 1857

Government
  - Body: SCB

Languages
  - Official: Telugu
- Time zone: UTC+5:30 (IST)
- PIN: 500026
- Vehicle registration: TG
- Lok Sabha constituency: Secunderabad
- Vidhan Sabha constituency: Secunderabad
- Planning agency: Secunderabad Cantonment Board
- Website: telangana.gov.in

Karkhana is a neighbourhood in Secunderabad, India. Part of the Trimulgherry Mandal, Karkhana is approximately 4 kilometres (2.5 mi) from Secunderabad station and approximately 1-kilometre (0.62 mi) from Jubilee Bus stand. The region has experienced a real estate boom in recent years and has become a base for a number of small IT start-ups. It can be reached easily by public transport and is well connected to surrounding areas.

== Sub regions ==
Karkhana is divided up into several colonies - Vikrampuri Colony, AP Textbook Colony, Venkat Ram Nagar (PAO ORS Colony), State Bank Colony, Gunrock Enclave, Vasavi Nagar, R n D Defence Colony, Priya Colony, Brooke Bond Colony, Jyothi Colony and many more.

== Transport ==
TSRTC connects Karkhana to Secunderabad Station, Paradise, thereby connecting commuters to all parts of the city. Jubilee Bus Station (JBS) is just one km distance away. JBS has a well connected network to many places in the Telangana and neighbouring states. The Hyderabad Metro Rail has a station at JBS Parade ground.

The closest MMTS Train station is at Secunderabad.
