= Joseph Yates =

Joseph Yates may refer to:

- Joseph Yates (judge) (1722–1770), English judge
- Joseph C. Yates (1768–1837), American lawyer, politician and founding trustee of Union College
- Joseph Brooks Yates (1780–1855), English merchant and antiquary
- Joseph Yates (cricketer) (1844–1916), English cricketer and lawyer
