= Trimulgherry Jail =

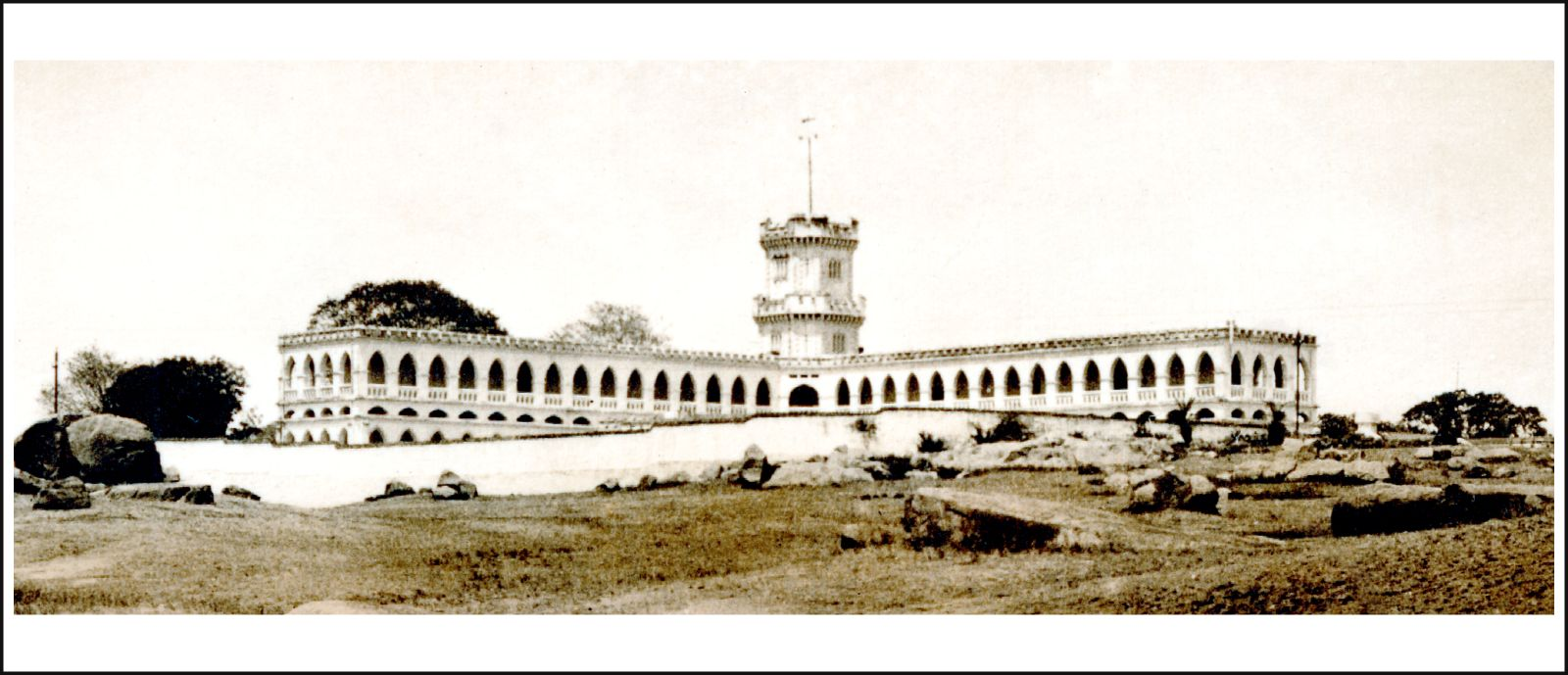
- View of the jail in 1928

- Location of Trimulgherry jail within Hyderabad. Trimulgherry Jail (Telangana) Trimulgherry Jail (India)
- Location: Trimulgherry; 17.470334092°N 78.5110753°E
- Status: Closed
- Opened: 1858; 168 years ago
- Closed: 1995; 31 years ago
- Managed by: Indian Army

Trimulgherry Jail also known as Military Reformatory at Tirumalgiri (MRT) is a former Indian military prison located in Secunderabad Cantonment at Tirumalagiri, in Hyderabad, Telangana. The jail was commissioned by the British in 1858 and is believed to have been the blueprint for the cellular jail which was later built in Andamans.

The jail was built as a Gothic structure with four wings extending in cardinal directions and appears as a cross when viewed from above. In those days, it reportedly cost the authorities Rs 4.71 lakh to construct the prison. There are 40 cells on ground floor and the first floor has 35. The total area occupied by prison is 2,260 square yards (1,890 m^{2}). The gallows were located on the third floor and around 500 persons are reported to have been executed inside the prison premises. Today the jail is under the control of 125 Infantry Battalion of the Territorial Army of Indian Army and access to it is severely restricted. The last prisoners to be lodged here were the Army personnel who had deserted in the wake of Operation Blue Star.

In recognition of the efforts put in to maintain the historic structure, in 1997 it was honoured with Charminar INTACH Heritage Award presented by Indian National Trust for Art and Cultural Heritage (INTACH).
