= Humphrey Yates =

English cricketer

Personal information
- Full name: Humphrey William Maghull Yates
- Born: 25 March 1883; Ellesmere Park, Lancashire, England
- Died: 21 August 1956 (aged 73); Abbotsford, Transvaal, South Africa
- Batting: Right-handed
- Bowling: Right-arm medium
- Relatives: Joseph Yates (father); James Yates (cousin)

Domestic team information
- Years: Team
- 1910–1913: Hampshire

Career statistics
| Competition | First-class |
|---|---|
| Matches | 20 |
| Runs scored | 646 |
| Batting average | 25.84 |
| 100s/50s | –/5 |
| Top score | 97 |
| Balls bowled | 108 |
| Wickets | 1 |
| Bowling average | 87.00 |
| 5 wickets in innings | – |
| 10 wickets in match | – |
| Best bowling | 1/25 |
| Catches/stumpings | 10/– |
- Source: Cricinfo, 2 January 2009

Humphrey William Maghull Yates (25 March 1883 — 21 August 1956) was an English first-class cricketer and cricket scorer.

The son of the cricketer and barrister Joseph Yates, he was born in March 1883 at Ellesmere Park, Lancashire. He was educated at Winchester College, before attending the Royal Military College, Sandhurst. Yates graduated from there into the Lancashire Fusiliers in April 1903, with promotion to lieutenant following in May 1908, at which point he transferred to the Royal Irish Fusiliers. A prominent player in army cricket, Yates made his debut in first-class cricket for Hampshire against Worcestershire at Worcester in the 1910 County Championship. He played all of his first-class cricket for Hampshire prior to the First World War, making thirteen appearances. In these matches, he scored 242 runs at an average of 15.12, with one half century score of 65 not out. He also played first-class cricket prior to the war for services-based teams, making two appearances for a combined Army and Navy cricket team and four for the British Army cricket team.

Having been promoted to captain in March 1913, Yates served during the war, in the course of which he was made a brevet major in January 1918. Seconded to the staff, Yates relinquished his appointment there following the war in September 1919. After the war, he made a further first-class appearance for the British Army cricket team, against the Royal Navy at Lord's in 1920. His five first-class matches for the army saw him score 249 runs at an average of 35.57, as well as making his highest first-class score of 97. Yates later emigrated to South Africa, where he continued to play club cricket to a good standard until he was 60. In South Africa, he took up scoring for the Transvaal Cricket Union in first-class and Test matches in Johannesburg from 1945 to 1956. He died in Abbotsford in Johannesburg on 21 August 1956. His cousin, James Yates, was also a first-class cricketer.
