= Lallaguda =

- neighbourhood
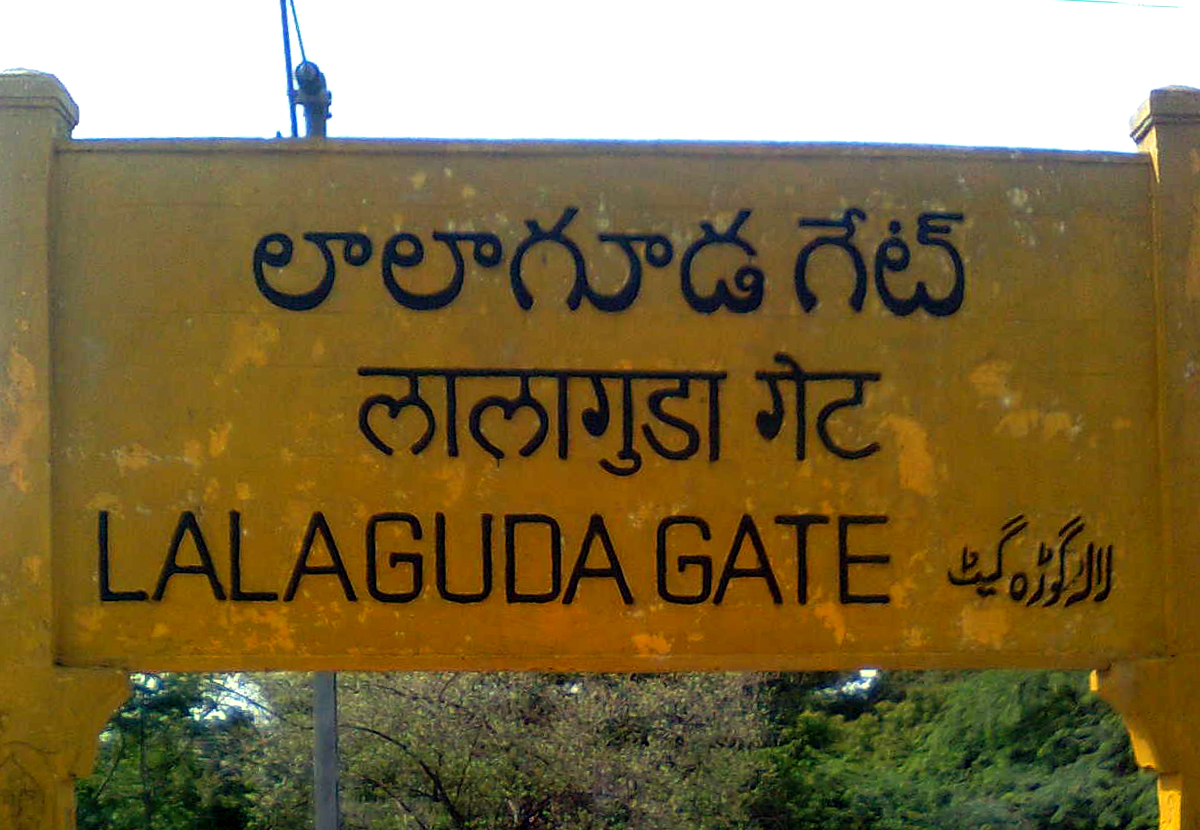

- Location in Hyderabad, India
- Coordinates: 17°26′N 78°32′E
- Country: India
- State: Telangana
- Mandal: Marredpally
- District: Hyderabad
- Metro: Hyderabad

Government
  - Body: GHMC

Languages
  - Official: Telugu
- Time zone: UTC+5:30 (IST)
- PIN: 500 017
- Lok Sabha constituency: Secunderabad
- Vidhan Sabha constituency: Secunderabad
- Planning agency: GHMC

Lallaguda is a suburb of Secunderabad, India. It is about 7 km from the city center on the way to Malkajgiri. This area is predominantly known for its railway facilities operated by the Indian Railways. Multiple broad gauge rail lines traverse through this area, dividing it into North and South Lallaguda. Large parts of Lallaguda house railway employees in railway-built housing. Lallaguda also hosts a large hospital for railway employees; one of the largest railway repair and service yards in the country; and several campuses for railway employee support and training.

== Transport ==
TSRTC runs multiple bus routes to this area, connecting to all parts of the twin cities. The closest MMTS Train Station is Sitaphalmandi on the Secunderabad to Falaknuma line.
