= Jubilee Bus Station =

Bus station in Secunderabad, India

Jubilee Bus Station (JBS)
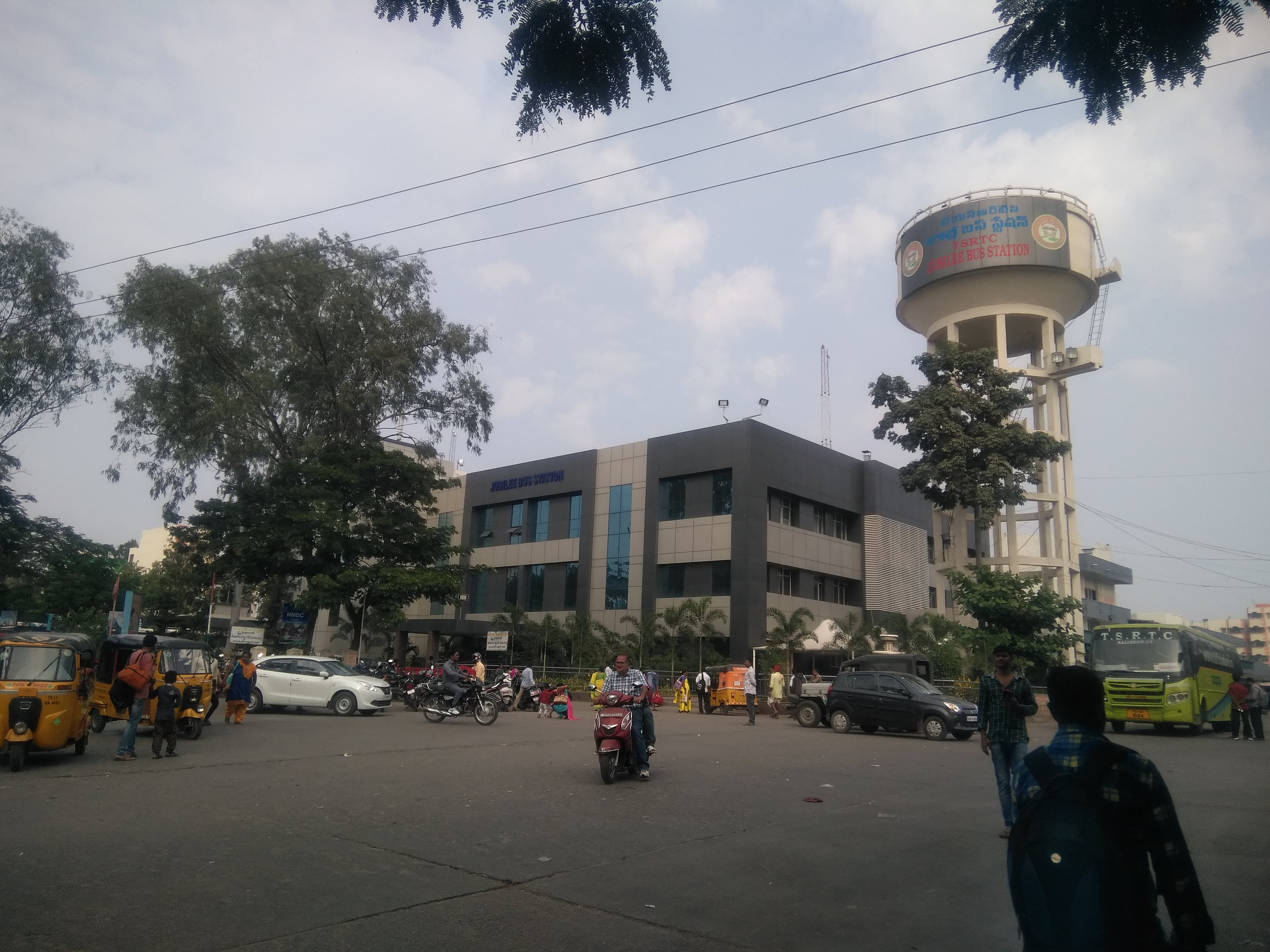
- View of the Jubilee Bus Station

General information
- Location: Picket, West Marredpally; Secunderabad; India
- Coordinates: 17.447932°N 78.498153°E
- System: Bus station
- Owner: Telangana State Road Transport Corporation
- Operator: Telangana State Road Transport Corporation
- Connections: Blue Line Green Line Parade Ground

Other information
- Status: operational
Location

Jubilee Bus Station popularly known as JBS is a bus station located in Secunderabad, Telangana, India. It is one of the two main bus stations for buses leaving Hyderabad city, the other being MGBS. It is owned by the state-run bus transport corporation, TGSRTC. JBS is located about 2 km from Secunderabad Railway Station and 800m distance from JBS Parade Ground Station.

The bus station is built on an area where once Picket Lake was located. The lake which was once connected to Hussain Sagar lake gradually got encroached. By 2008 various encroachments were demolished to develop the bus station.

== Infrastructure ==
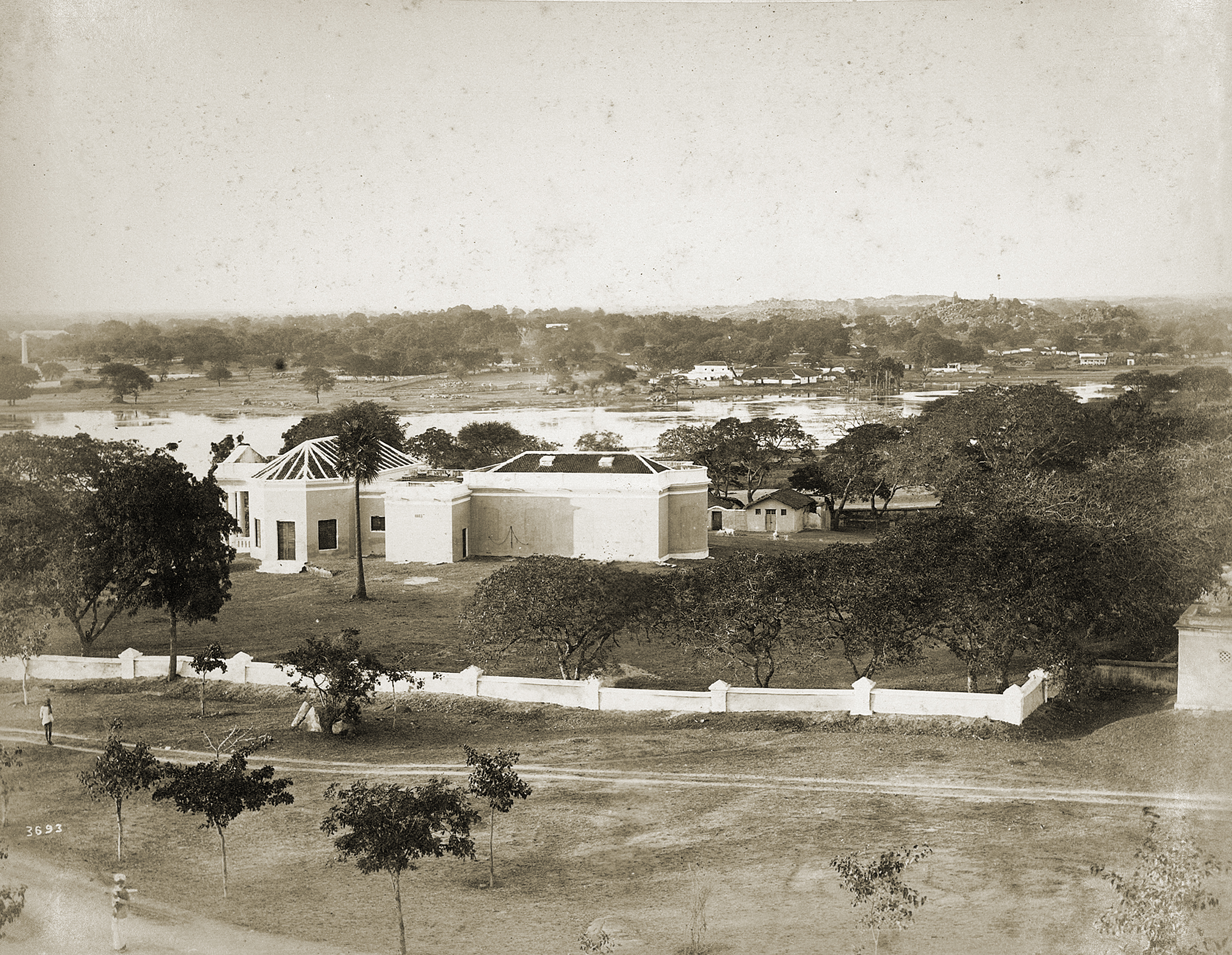
Picquet lake at Secunderabad in 1890s with St. John's Masonic Hall at the forefront

The Jubilee bus station (JBS) is spread over approximately five acres in West Marredpally. It has a total of 18 platforms and acts as one of the two intercity bus stations in Hyderabad. JBS was comprehensively modernized in 2020 at a cost of ₹4 crore to provide passengers with enhanced amenities. The two‑level terminal features covered seating bays, dedicated ticket counters, electronic display boards for real‑time schedule updates, and 18 CCTV cameras for security. Additional facilities include clean restrooms, drinking‑water points, steel benches, Wi‑Fi hotspots, LED lighting and on‑site ATMs, along with food stalls and nearby retail shops. The bus station has a better connectivity as it lies 2 km from Secunderabad Railway Station and 800 m from the Parade Ground Metro Station, with newly widened access roads financed by the Secunderabad Cantonment Board.

== Future Expansion ==
The Jubilee Bus Station is proposed for a transformative upgrade with the development of an integrated metro hub by Hyderabad Airport Metro Limited (HAML). Proposed as the city’s first tri-line convergence point, the project will feature three independent metro stations connected via skywalks, alongside a modernized bus terminal. Spread across 30 acres, the facility will include multi-level cellar parking, commercial complexes, and high-end passenger amenities. Developed through a public-private partnership, the hub aims to ease traffic congestion and stimulate urban growth in Secunderabad. Once completed, it will stand as one of India’s most advanced transit-oriented developments, second only to Delhi’s Kashmere Gate in scale and integration.
