= Bowenpally =

Bowenpally Bhuvanapalli
- Secunderabad
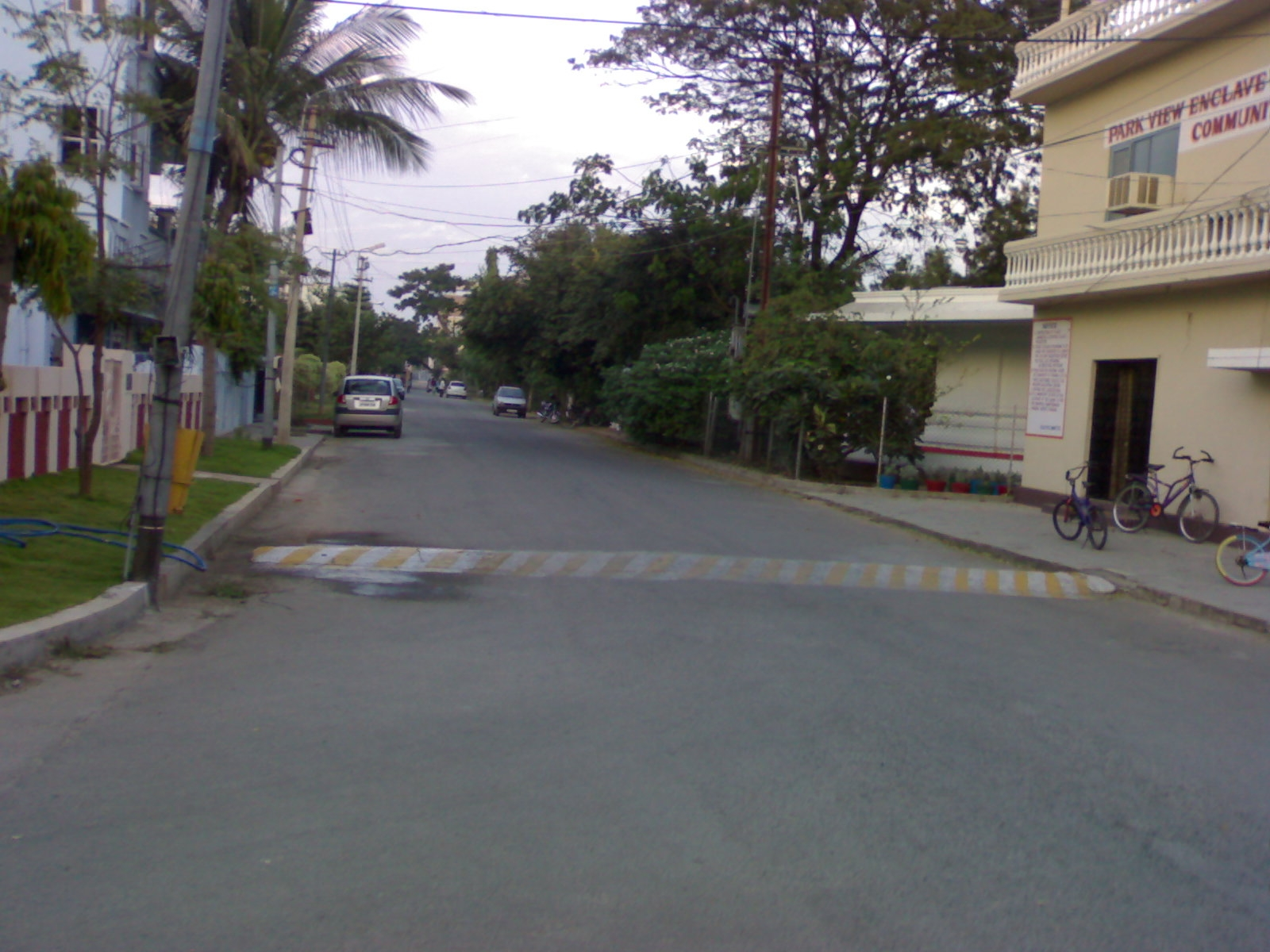
- Park View Enclave

- Location in Hyderabad, India
- Coordinates: 17.476111°N 78.482778°E
- Country: India
- State: Telangana
- District: Hyderabad district
- Merto: Hyderabad Metropolitan Development Authority
- Founded: 10th century
- Named for: Trailokya Malla Bhuvanesvara

Government
  - Body: Greater Hyderabad Municipal Corporation; Secunderabad Cantonment Board

Languages
  - Official: Telugu, Urdu
- Time zone: UTC+5:30 (IST)
- PIN: 500011
- Lok Sabha constituency: Malkajgiri
- Vidhan Sabha constituency: Kukatpally
- Planning agency: Secunderabad Cantonment Board

Bowenpally (Spelled as Bow-en-palli) is a locality in Secunderabad in the City of Hyderabad, India. It is predominantly an upper middle class area. It has some of the best residential colonies. It is located on the northwest fringe of secunderabad city. Bowenpally is part of the secunderabad area, where the British held sway for several years. The old village of Bowenpally with its people-friendly streets still exist. One among the few old structures left is an old shrine with some rough sculptures of a bull with distinct Kakatiyan design, near the Bowenpally Police Station. It is a juncture connecting different parts of the city.

The Hyderabad airport has a single 0927 (east–west) runway. Bowenpally is just north of this unmistakable landmark. It is also the meeting point of two national highways: NH 7 (marked as "Nizamabad Road" on the map) and NH 9 (marked as "Pune Road" on the map). It serves as the gateway to the city from these two highways. Bowenpally is known for its peace and communal harmony with masjids, gurdwaras and temples galore. The community is richly diverse with people of various ethnicities.

== History ==
In early days, Secunderabad was a small town with three major villages, namely Tirumalagiri, Bowenpally and Karkhana. The name "Bowenpally" derives from Bhuvanapalli. It is named after the King of Chalukya, Trailokya Malla Bhuvanesvara, from the 10th century. The State Archeology Department found an inscription on a pillar dating from the Chalukya times, thus confirming the name. Indian

Legendary Photographer, Lala Deen Dayal lived here in Plassey lines area of Bowenpally.

== Transport ==
TSRTC runs many buses that connect it to different parts of the city like 26,26N,26M,26S, 26M/229, ply from Secunderabd Station to Old-Bowenpally and other special buses such as 26/8C,26B/7K, 49M/26 8N/26 26M/229 etc. ply during the office hours. Also, 24E/31H plies through bowenpally. Another bus numbered 26G plies from the station to Greenfields via Hasmathpet.

The closest MMTS Train station is at Fatehnagar.

The traffic is high throughout the day, and many buses (226, 229, 230A) and other vehicles ply to Secunderabad city via New Bowenpally.

There is a new plan to add a traffic light at the Center Point and Diamond Point Irani hotels to ease congestion. In addition the Cantonment has plans to widen the road to ease growing traffic.

== Sub-regions ==
Bowenpally has two major sub-regions, Old Bowenpally and New Bowenpally. There are a lot of gated communities in the area.

=== Old Bowenpally ===
Bowenpally is an amalgamation of Old Bowenpally and New Bowenpally. Old-bowenpally is close to Trimulghery and 4 km from Paradise. Major Transit locations like Rathifile Bus stop and Secunderabad Railway Station are near the Old Bowenpally. Old Bowenpally is a landmark of Education with more than 30 schools and about 10 colleges. Numerous apartments, flats and individual houses have been constructed every year to mark as one of the business centres. There are various Temples, Masjids and Churches built.

=== New Bowenpally ===
New Bowenpally is modern and very close to the city, although there are good colonies in both Old and New Bowenpally. New Bowenpally has two areas, Pedda Thokatta and Chinna Thokatta.

New Bowenpally comes under cantonment area, along with other surrounding areas surrounding, such as Tadbund, Tirumalagiri and Alwal. The cantonment has their own administration and tax departments, including facilities such as water and construction approvals.

New Bowenpally connects to both NH7 highway towards Medchal and NH9 highway towards Balanagar industrial area. There is an Old Airport road and a burial grounds and Mount Carmel School in this area, also called Old Bombay Highway.
