= Tirumalagiri =

Trimulgherry Trimulgherry
- Suburb
- Trimulgherry
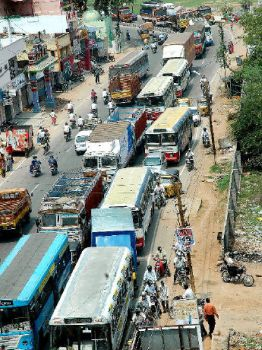
- Traffic in Trimulgherry

- Location in Hyderabad, India
- Coordinates: 17°28′16″N 78°30′34″E
- Country: India
- State: Telangana
- District: Hyderabad District
- Metro: Hyderabad Metropolitan Development Authority
- Established: 1857

Government
  - Body: Cantonment Board, Secunderabad

Languages
  - Official: Telugu
- Time zone: UTC+5:30 (IST)
- PIN: 500015
- Lok Sabha constituency: Secunderabad
- Vidhan Sabha constituency: Cantonment
- Planning agency: Cantonment Board, Secunderabad

Trimulgherry, is a locality and a Mandal in the city of Secunderabad which falls under Secunderabad Revenue Division, and is a major suburb of Secunderabad, in Telangana, India. It is in the north of Hyderabad District. Tirumalagiri used to be base for the British in the Secunderabad cantonment in colonial era and many British people lived here even after the independence . Mainly many churches were built around this area for the British. Few notable ones are Holy Family Church, Wesley Garrison Church, All saints Churches. These churches are of old era. A military hospital was built for the British, it now serves the Indian armed forces. Tirumalagiri also has very famous Surya Bhagwan Temple, one of the few dedicated to Sun God where there is a small pond. Tirumalagiri is connected to various parts of Hyderabad and Secunderabad through TSRTC bus services.

The suburb has many smaller residential townships. Adjacent suburbs like Karkhana and AOC centre are often considered part of Tirumalagiri. In the past 15 years, this suburb has become an important residential area in the twin cities. Many colonies, townships, and apartments came up in this suburb. Tirumalagiri also has football ground where numerous players represented erstwhile Andhra Pradesh. Few went on to represent India. Many of these players played for Army, South Central Railways, SBI, SBH, AG Office etc .

Closeby, a small lake known as the Hasmathpet lake supplies fresh fish to the city.

== History ==
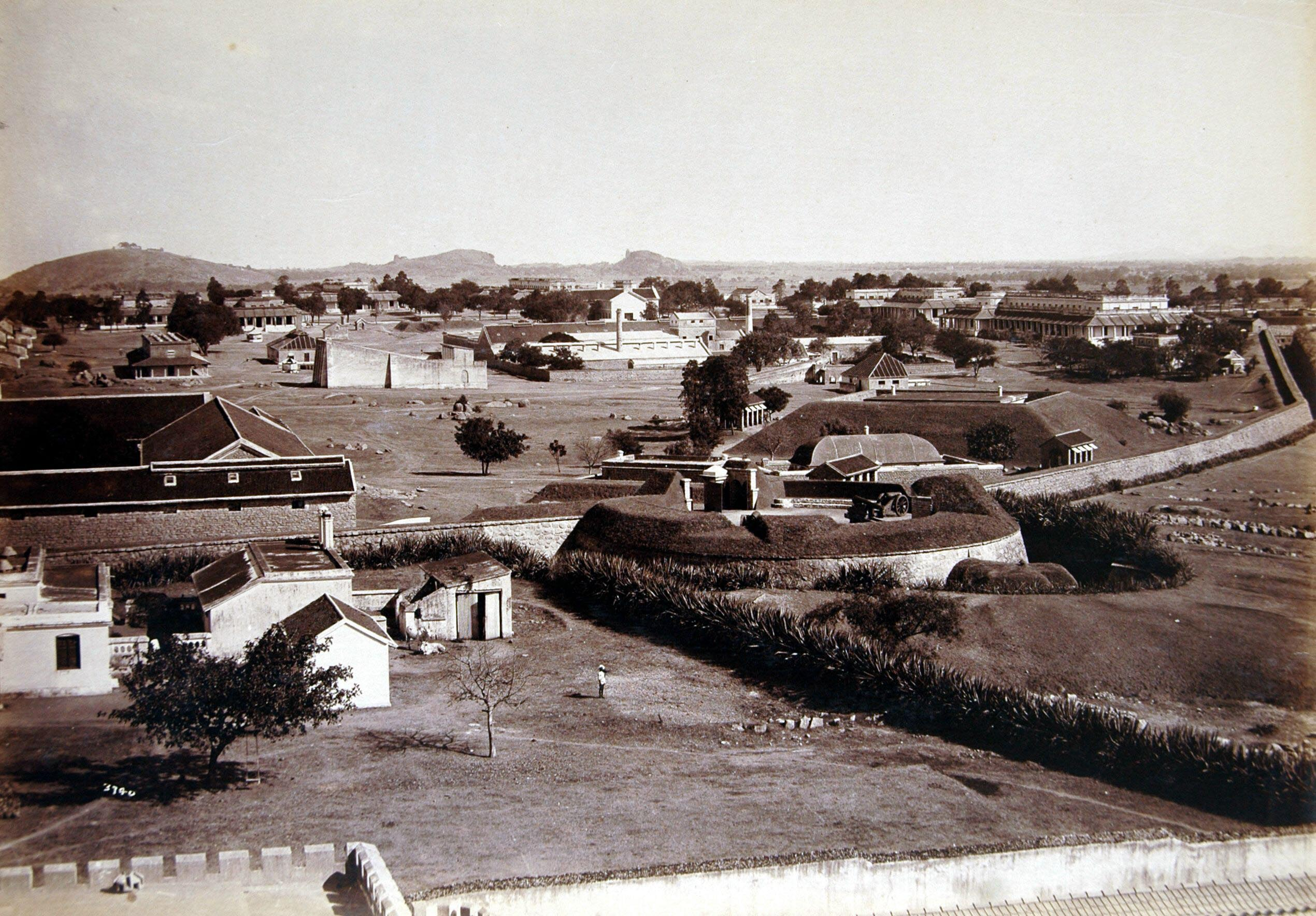
Trimulgherry Entrenchment

Historically, Secunderabad constituted a combination of three villages namely, Tirumalagiri, Bowenpally and Marredpally. It has some historic buildings built during the British era like an old British Jail and a Medical college. Sir Ronald Ross who discovered cure for Malaria worked not far from this place at Sir Ronald Ross Institute of Parasitology. Originally This is base for British Army, as many buildings were constructed by British eg British Jail, Military Hospital, You could also see surrounding this area, a lot of Tamil-speaking people who have settled at Tirumalagiri, Lal Bazaar, Old Diary Farm, Kantha Basti, 108 Bazaar etc. These people were brought by British from Tamil Nadu and settled here hundreds of years back. These people used to work in British army, Military Hospital, and in the houses of Britishers as domestic servants.

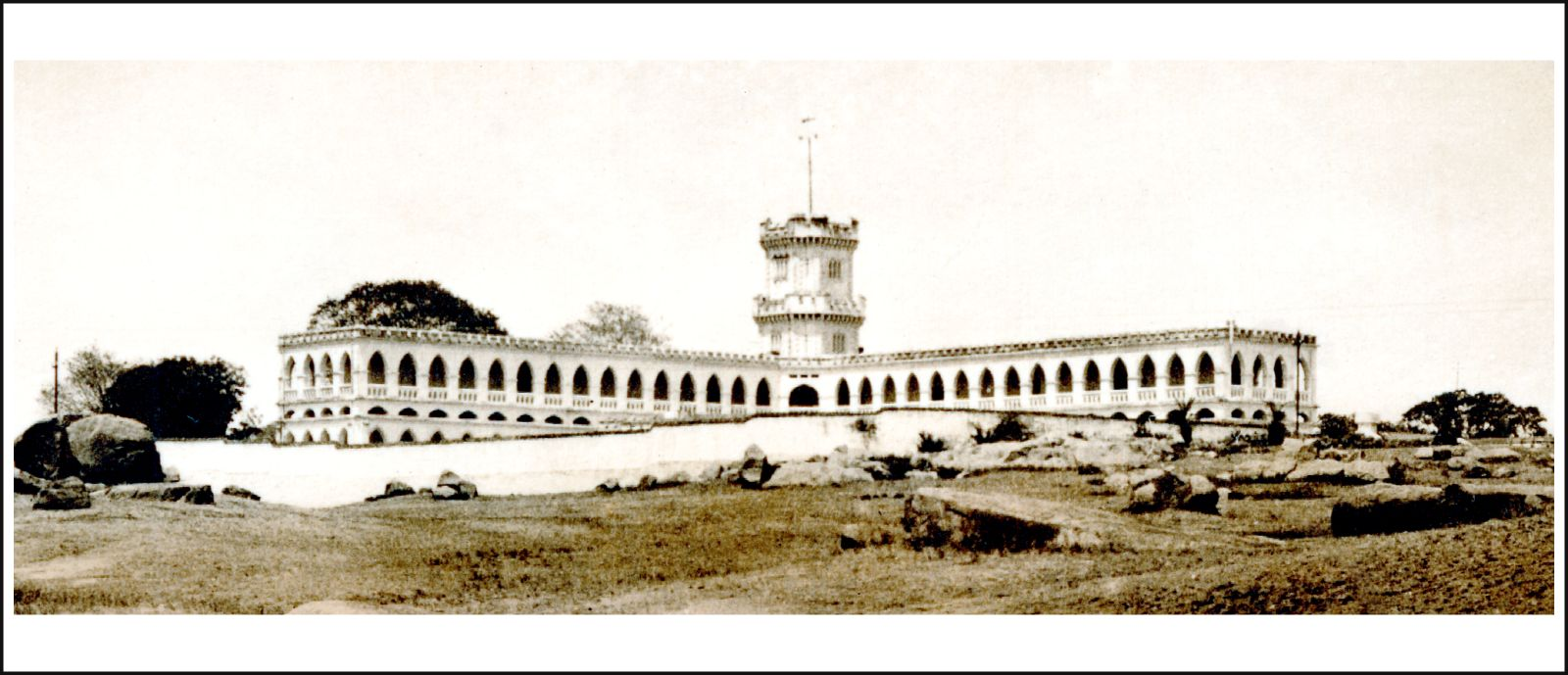
Army prison in Tirumulgherry circa 1928

== Schools ==
There are some good schools and colleges in this suburb. Notable are Holy Family Girls High School (oldest school ), St Josephs High School, Delhi Public School, New Ushodaya High School (Subhash Nagar), Sherwood Public School, St Andrews School, Kendriya Vidyalaya Gowtham Model School, Army School R. K. Puram.

=== Suburbs around Tirumalagiri ===
- Secunderabad City 5 km
- Begumpet Airport 6.5 km (via Tadbund)
- Karkhana 2 km
- Bowenpally Old and New 3 km
- Sikh Village 2 km
- Tadbund 3 km
- ECIL 'X' Roads 8 km
- Alwal 3.5 km
- Bolarum 6 km
- Marredpally East and West 4 km
- Sainikpuri 6 km
- Balanagar 5 km

== Gallery ==
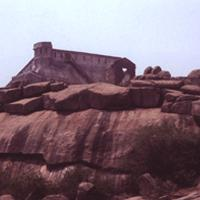
Historic Gunrock Water Tank in Trimulgherry

Factory Outlets at Trimulgherry Cross Roads

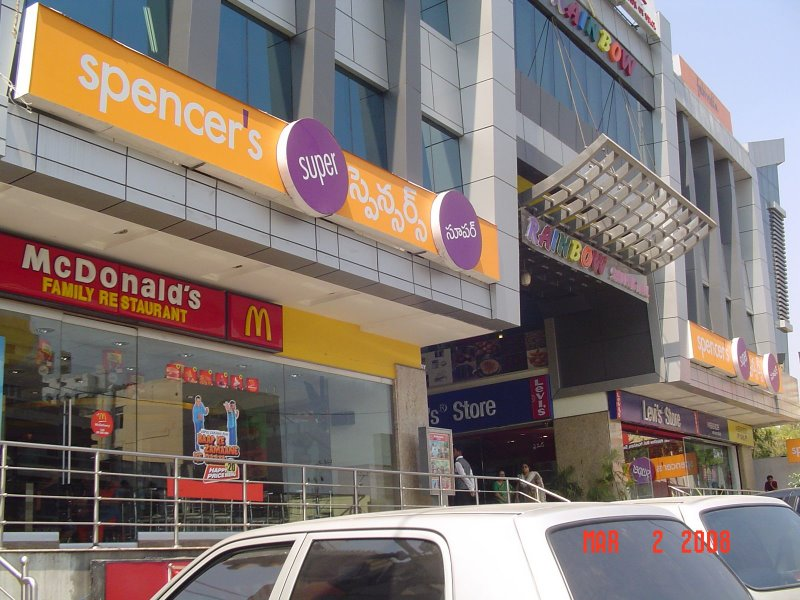
Rainbow Shopping Mall in Trimulgherry

== Notable people ==
- James Yates (cricketer)
- Shyam Benegal
