= Tadbund Hanuman Temple =

Sri Tadbund Veeranjaneya Temple
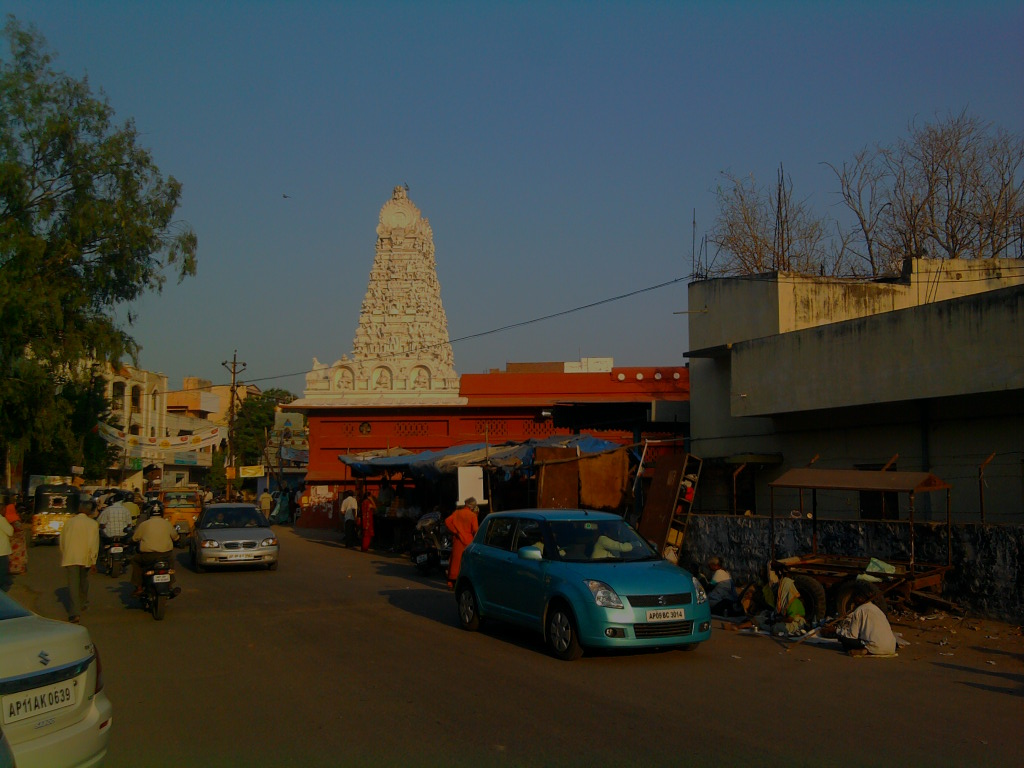
- Tadbund Hanuman temple

Religion
- Affiliation: Hinduism
- District: Hyderabad
- Deity: Lord Hanuman

Location
- Location: Tadbund, Hyderabad
- State: Telangana
- Country: India

Sri Tadbund Veeranjaneya Swamy temple is an old Hindu temple located in Sikh Village in Secunderabad. It is very popular with the devotees of Lord Hanuman.
