= H. P. Newsholme =

British physician and writer

- Born: 27 August 1885; Secunderabad, India
- Died: 21 December 1955 (aged 70); Harborne
- Occupations: Physician, writer

Henry Pratt Newsholme (27 August 1885 – 21 December 1955) D.M., F.R.C.P., D.P.H. was a British physician and writer.

Newsholme was born at Secunderabad, India. He was the son of Rev. B. Pratt Newholme and was educated at Brighton Grammar School (1903) and Balliol College, Oxford (1907).

He obtained a B.Sc. with first-class honours in physiology from the natural science school in Oxford. He graduated B.M., B.Ch. from St Thomas's Hospital Medical School in 1910 and became a member of the Royal College of Physicians the same year. In 1911, he obtained the D.P.H. of the English Royal Colleges and took the D.M. in 1915. He was admitted F.R.C.P in 1927.

Newsholme was house-physician at St. Thomas's and clinical assistant at the Evelina Children's Hospital. He was assistant medical officer of health at Brighton Borough Fever Hospital. He was a captain in the R.A.M.C. and served in France and Italy (1915–1918). He was professor of hygiene and public health at Birmingham University (1937–1941) and was appointed medical officer of health of Birmingham. He held this position for twenty-three years, until 1950.

He authored medical works which stressed the importance of mind on the body. Newsholme held deep religious views which he promoted in several books, Evolution and Redemption (1933), Christian Ethics and Social Health (1937) and Matter, Man, and Miracle (1951). He was a theistic evolutionist.

Newsholme was received into the Catholic Church in 1939 with his wife who he married in 1914. He was elected president of the Midland Catholic Medical Society in 1949. He had three sons and two daughters. He died age 70 at his home in Harborne.

== Selected publications ==
- Preventive Medicine and the Healthy Mind (1926)
- Health, Disease and Integration (1929)
- Evolution and Redemption (1933)
- Christian Ethics and Social Health (1937)
- Matter, Man, and Miracle (1951)
