= Hasmathpet =

- Neighbourhood
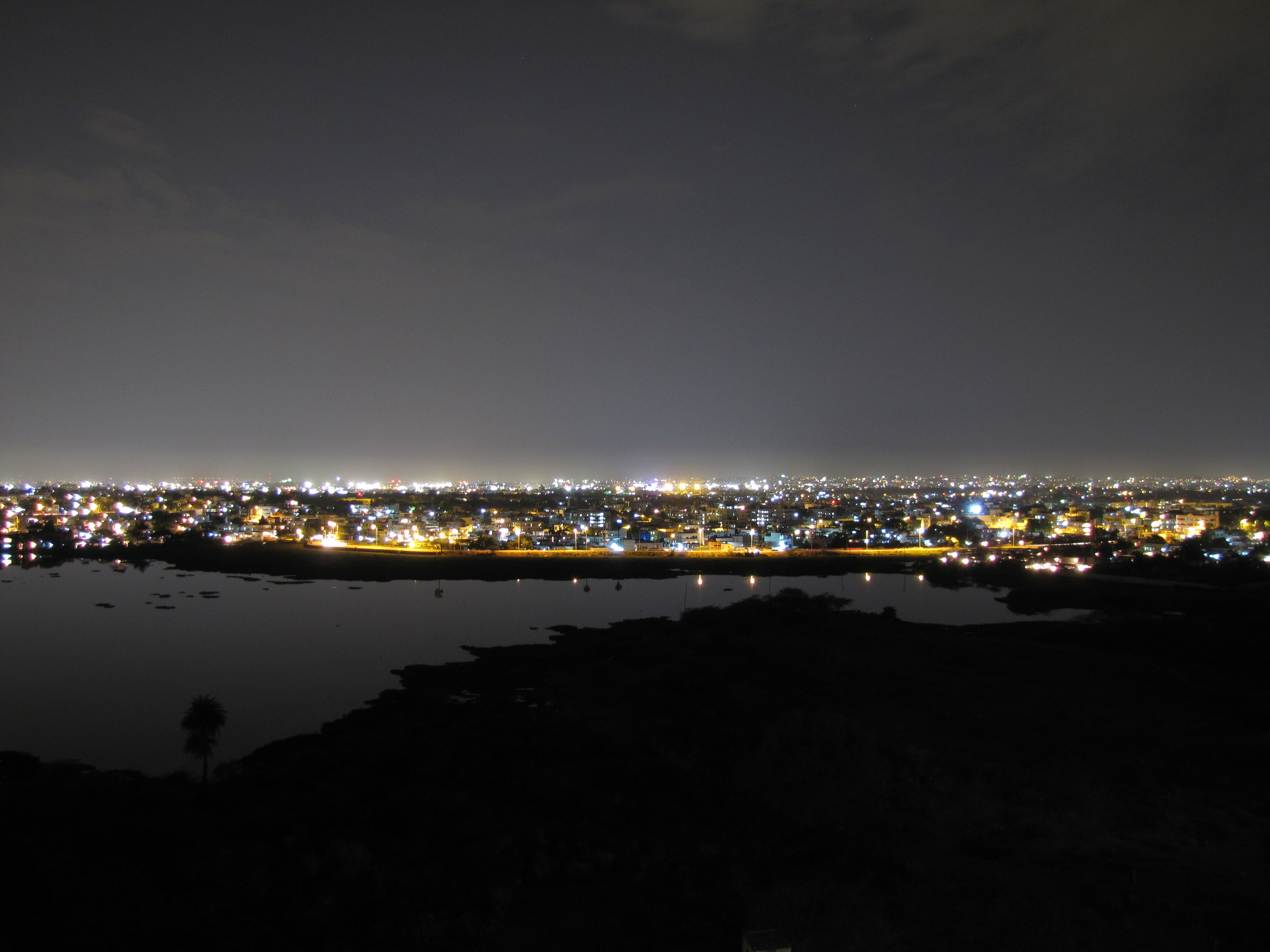
- Hashmethpet lake

- Location in Hyderabad, India Hasmathpet (India)
- Coordinates: 17°28′20″N 78°29′10″E
- Country: India
- State: Telangana
- District: Hyderabad
- Metro: Hyderabad
- Zone: North Zone
- Ward: 121

Government
  - Body: GHMC

Languages
  - Official: Telugu
- Time zone: UTC+5:30 (IST)
- PIN: 500009
- Lok Sabha constituency: Malkajgiri
- Vidhan Sabha constituency: Kukatpally
- Planning agency: GHMC
- Civic agency: GHMC

Hasmathpet, is a small town that comes under Old Bowenpally in Secunderabad in the Indian state of Telangana. It is the site of the medieval Hasmathpet cairns.
