= Secunderabad Clock Tower =

Clock tower located in the Secunderabad, Hyderabad, India

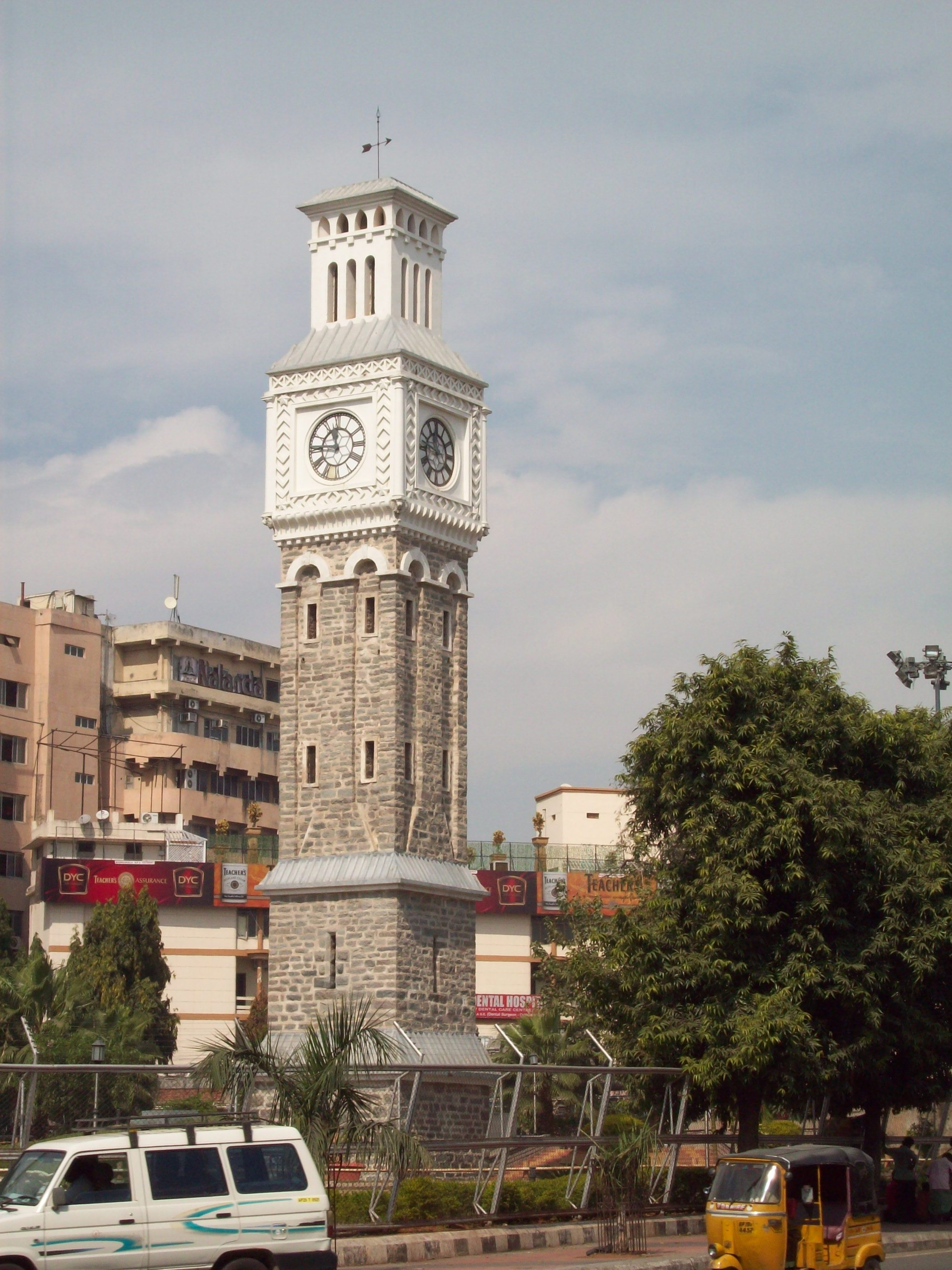
- Interactive map of Secunderabad Clock Tower
- Location: Secunderabad, Telangana
- Coordinates: 17.4408°N 78.4985°E
- Type: Victory column
- Height: 120 feet (37 m)
- Opening date: 1 February 1897; 129 years ago
- Dedicated to: British officers posted at the erstwhile Secunderabad Cantonment

Secunderabad Clock Tower is a clock tower located in the Secunderabad region of Hyderabad, India. Constructed in 1860 on 10 acres (4.0 ha) of land, the structure was inaugurated on 1 February 1897.

== History ==
A firman issued by Nizam Sikandar Jah established the city of Secunderabad after his name in 1806. To honour the progress achieved by the British officers stationed at Secunderabad Cantonment in Hyderabad, the erstwhile British government established 10 acres (4.0 ha) of land for this purpose in 1860. A 120-ft high clock tower was constructed in a park of 2.5 acres (1.0 ha) in 1896. The tower was inaugurated by Resident Sir Trevor John Chichele Plowden on 1 February 1897. The clock on the tower was donated by Dewan Bahadur Seth Lachmi Narayan Ramgopal, a businessman.

In 2003, the tower was placed on a demolition list drawn up by the Municipal Corporation of Hyderabad to accommodate the increasing traffic. A senior official at this civic agency of the Government of Andhra Pradesh said that they were trying their best not to demolish this structure. In 2006, the park housing the tower was chosen for renovation by the same agency. Carried out at a cost of ₹10 million (US$100,000), the park's size was reduced to widen the roads. In addition, the tower was renovated, the park was landscaped with lawns and hedges, and a waterfall was installed. The renovation was completed in 2005, and the park was inaugurated by then Chief Minister of Andhra Pradesh Y. S. Rajasekhara Reddy in 2006. A martyr's memorial was also established inside the park in memory of the first police firing in 1969 during a separate Telangana agitation. Within a year after this, two of the tower's four clocks experienced technical problems and stopped working.

The tower was declared a heritage structure in the twin cities of Hyderabad-Secunderabad. It was as a result of the efforts put by the civic agency at sites like this tower that the proposal to seek UNESCO Heritage status for Hyderabad was revived.

In 2006, the 200-year celebrations of the formation of Secunderabad were organised by the Government of Andhra Pradesh. The clock tower was chosen as the subject of the logo, which was designed by a local firm. The outline of the Clock Tower was first conceived by the students of a city architectural college. A short cinema film of 9 minutes, 30 seconds by director Mani Shankar was released as a part of this celebration. The film, which relates the history of the city, features the clock tower in it.

The park housing the tower also served as a venue for promoting various citizen-centric events such as a children's film festival, awareness programs among others.
