= Hasmathpet cairns =

Hasmathpet cairns is a historic cairn circle or megalithic burial site located about 8 kilometres (5.0 mi) from Secunderabad. The site is among 12 other such sites that are state protected. The cairns discovered at Hasmathpet dates back to 2nd century BC. These cairns are made up of large stones arranged in specific patterns and used as burial chambers. The cairns served as sacred spaces for burial rituals and symbolised the beliefs and reverence for the deceased There are also megalithic burial sites at Moulali, Kothaguda, Hyderabad Central University campus near Lingampalli. Later in 2008 a new site was also discovered at Kethepalli near Ramoji Film City.

As of today the site spread occupying an area of approximately 30 acres which was handed over to Department of Archaeology and Museums in 1953 is reportedly being encroached by various builders aided with official apathy. Various construction activities have been allowed and the place is being used to dump debris and construction material.

== History ==
The site was reportedly first discovered by Dr. Walker in 19th century and dates back to second century B.C. Another excavation was done in excavation was taken up in 1934-35 during the reign of Nizam, under the supervision of D. G. Mackenzie. Next round of excavations took place in 1971 with Birla Archaeological and Cultural Research Institute. The last round of excavations was done in 2001.

Hasmathpet village is located near Secunderabad in Ranga Reddy District. These burials were first discovered and protected by the Department of Archaeology, Nizam Government.
