= James Yates (cricketer) =

English cricketer and British Indian Army officer

Personal information
- Full name: James Ainsworth Yates
- Born: 24 November 1883; Trimulgherry, Hyderabad State, British India
- Died: 1 December 1929 (aged 46); Maymo, Mandalay Division, Burma
- Batting: Unknown
- Relatives: Joseph Yates (uncle); Humphrey Yates (cousin)

Domestic team information
- Years: Team
- 1900: Berkshire
- 1911/12–1915/16: Europeans

Career statistics
Competition	First-class
Matches	4
Runs scored	59
Batting average	11.80
100s/50s	–/–
Top score	37
Catches/stumpings	1/–
- Source: ESPNcricinfo, 6 February 2019

James Ainsworth Yates (24 November 1883 – 1 December 1929) DSO, CSI was an English first-class cricketer and British Indian Army officer.

== Early life and first-class cricket ==
Yates was born at Trimulgherry in British India to Major Henry Townley Scott Yates and his wife, Sophia Yates. He was educated in England at Reading School. He played minor counties cricket for Berkshire in 1900, playing in three matches in the Minor Counties Championship. Yates enlisted in the British Army, where he served in the Royal Leicestershire Regiment. In June 1906 he was a lieutenant and held the duty of Superintendent of Gymnasia in the regiment. He transferred from the Royal Leicestershire Regiment to the British Indian Army shortly after, at which point he returned the rank of second lieutenant at his own request. By October 1907 he was serving in the Maratha Light Infantry, at which point he was promoted to back to the rank of lieutenant. He was promoted to captain in December 1910. While serving in British India he made his debut in first-class cricket for Europeans at Poona in the 1911/12 Bombay Presidency. He made a further first-class appearance for the Europeans in 1912, before making two further appearances in 1915.

== World War I and later life ==
He served during the First World War, during which he was promoted to major in December 1916. He was made a Companion to the Order of the Star of India in August 1917. He was awarded the Distinguished Service Order in August 1918. Yates was promoted to the rank of lieutenant colonel in February 1926, with promotion to the rank of brevet colonel following in July 1929. He died five months later in December at Maymo in Burma.

His cousin Humphrey Yates and uncle Joseph Yates both played first-class cricket.
