= Secunderabad Cantonment Board =

Civic authority of Secunderabad, India

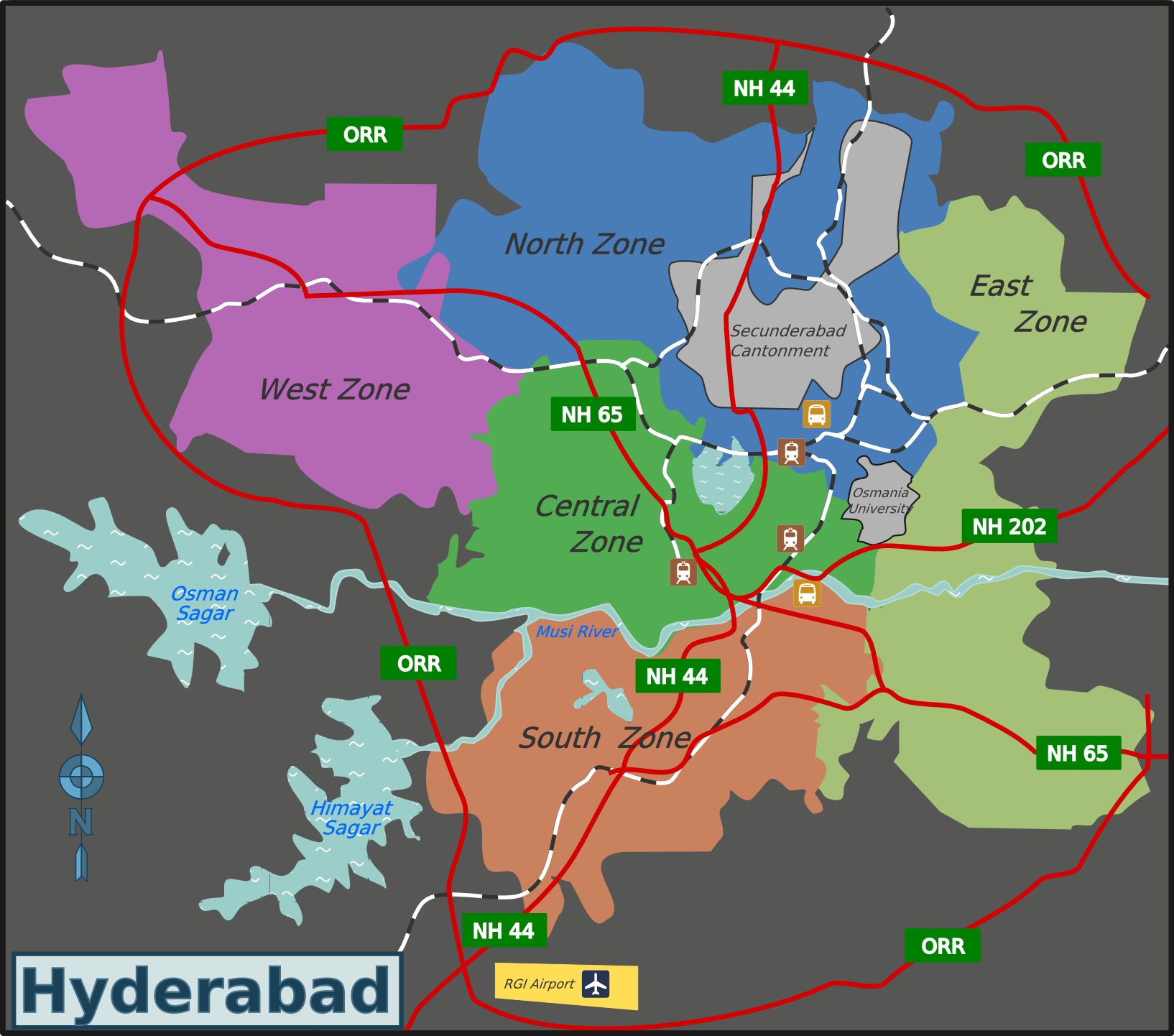
Secunderabad Cantonment along with six zones in Hyderabad

Secunderabad Cantonment Board (SCB) is the civic administrative agency of Secunderabad cantonment area. Geographically, it lies in the twin cities of Hyderabad-Secunderabad. Secunderabad Cantonment Board is India’s second largest cantonment board, after Bathinda Cantonment. There are eight civilian wards in Secunderabad Cantonment Board, with a population of four lakh. Being primarily a military area, the Secunderabad cantonment comes under the administrative purview of the union defence ministry of the government of India. It oversees an area of 71.23 km^{2} (27.50 sq mi), where there are several military camps. Secunderabad Cantonment has a huge land bank (about 18,350 acres), which has been protected since the British era.

== Demographics ==
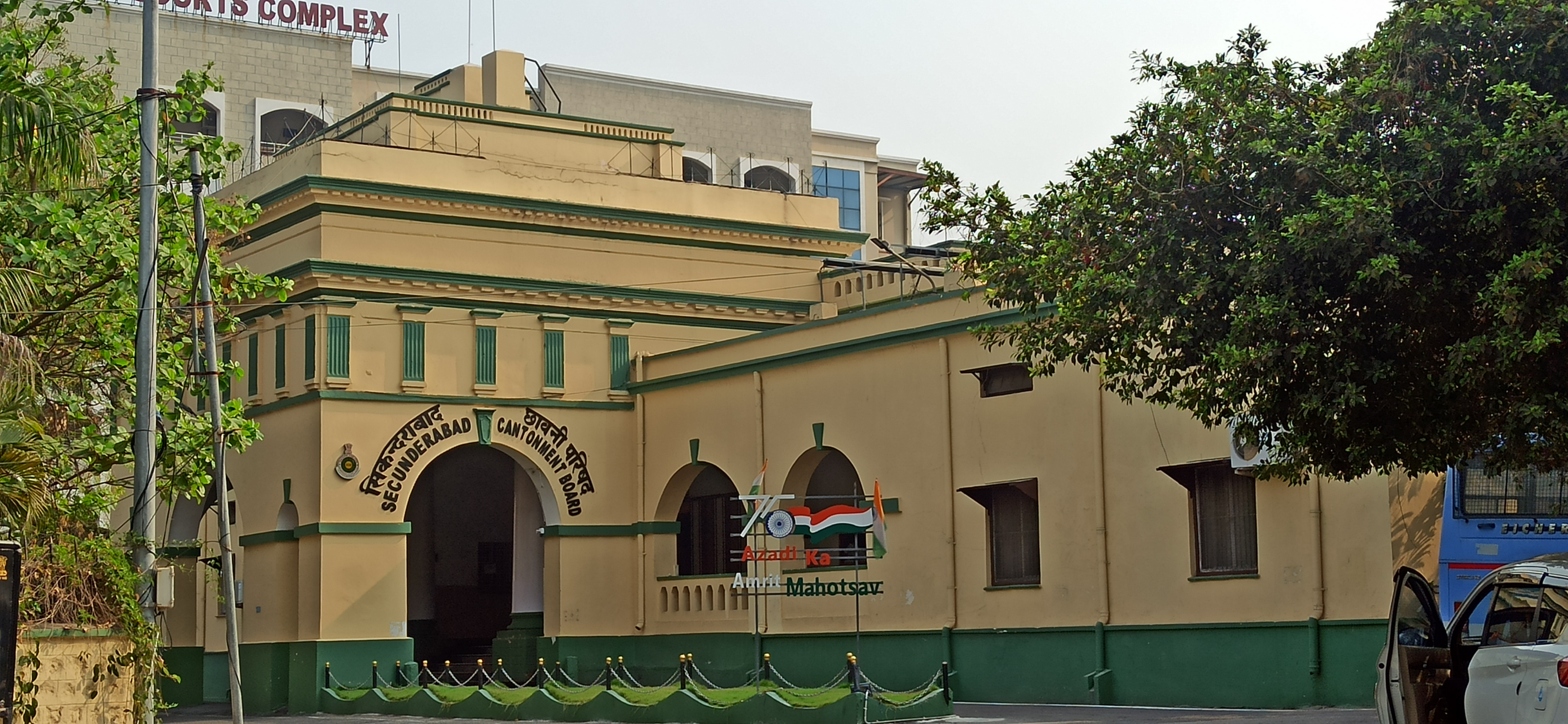
Cantonment Board

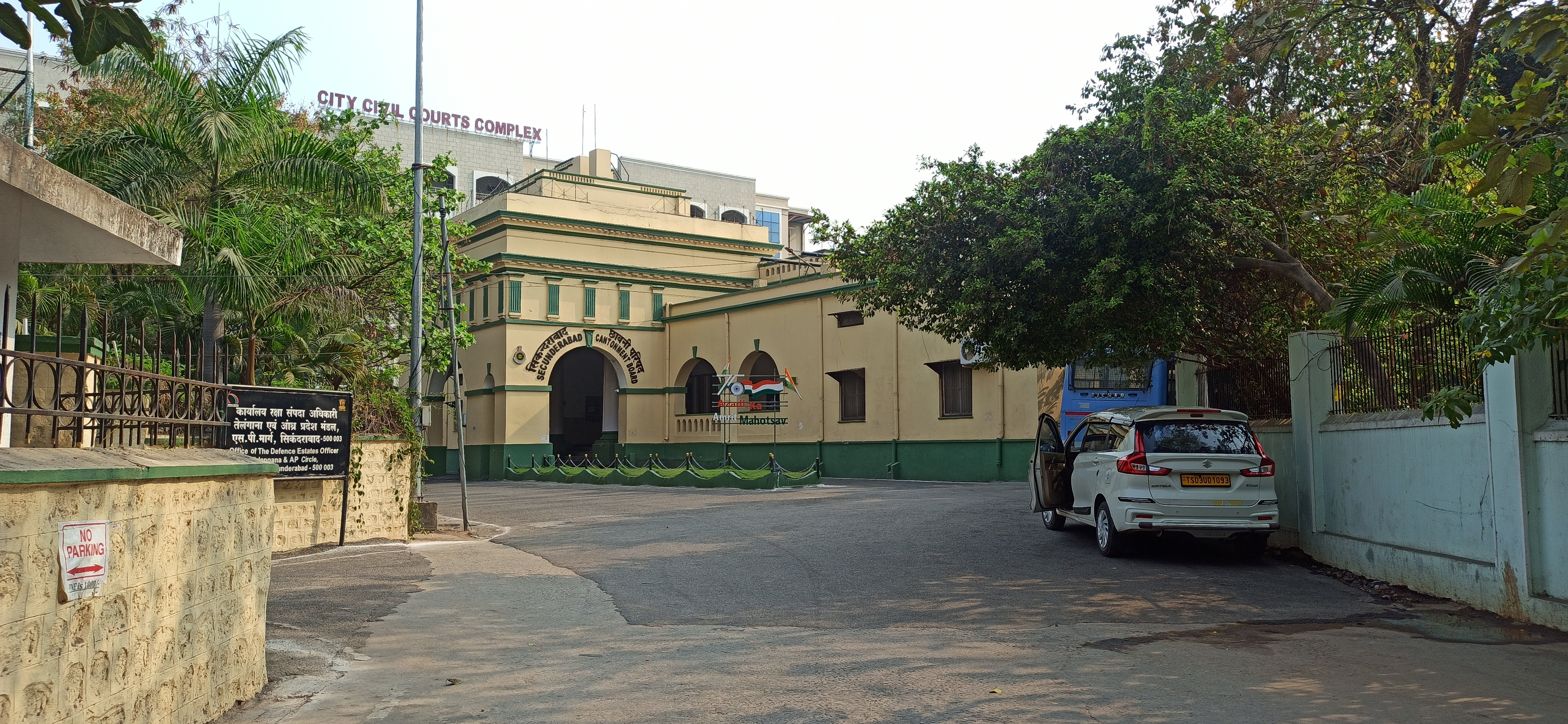
Cantonment Board

As of 2011 census of India, it had a population of 217,910 and an area of 22.81 km^{2} (8.81 sq mi) with 50,333 households.

The infrastructure management and administration of the civilian areas in the cantonment are looked after by the Board. As per the Cantonment Act of 2006, Secunderabad cantonment is classified as a Class-I cantonment.

The General-Officer-Commanding (GOC) or Deputy GOC of the Indian Army's Telangana and Andhra Sub Area acts as the president of the board. The executive powers of the board are vested in the CEO who is an Indian Defence Estates Service officer appointed by the union defence ministry. Half the members on the board are elected by the civilian population residing in the cantonment in the board's general elections. The other half comprise the CEO, the Hyderabad district collector and military officers nominated by the board's president. Though not members of the board, as per the Cantonment Act the local MP and MLA are special invitees to the board meetings.

== Areas in Cantonment ==
- Trimulghery
- Marredpally
- Bowenpally
- Hakimpet
- Jawahar nagar
- Bolarum
- Ammuguda
- Kawkour

== History ==
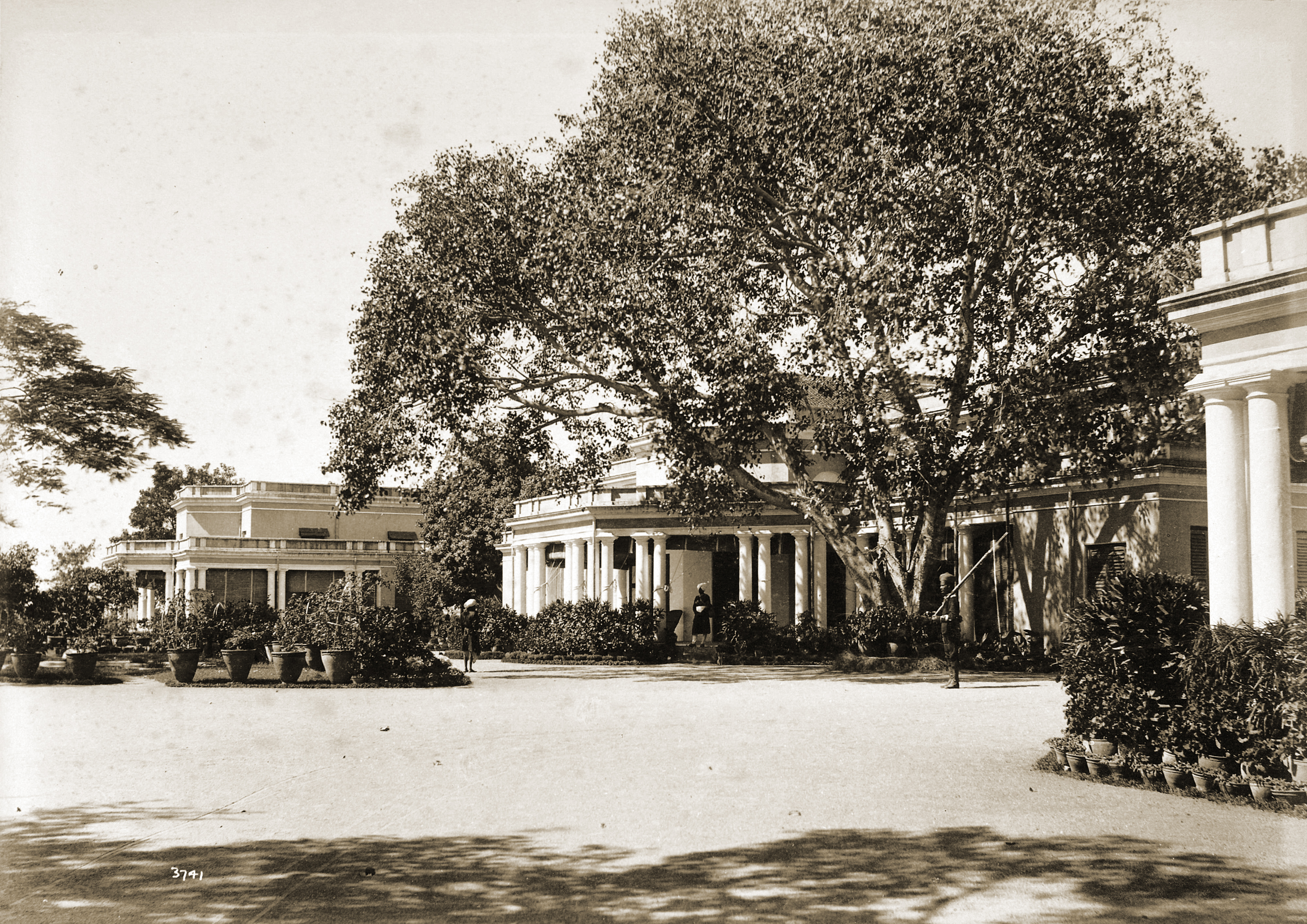
British Residency House Bolarum during Nizams era, Photo 1892, Curzon collection.

The significant presence of the military in the Secunderabad Cantonment area can be dated back to the days of the British Raj in the early 1800s. To honour the progress achieved by the British officers stationed at Secunderabad Cantonment in Hyderabad, the erstwhile British government established 10 acres (4.0 ha) of land for building a Clock Tower in 1860.

Before Indian Independence and Police action in 1948, according to the agreement between the British and the Nizam of Hyderabad, the cantonment was under the control of the British. Later, owing to the huge military presence, the area was brought under the control of the defence ministry. The British Prime Minister during the World War-II Sir Winston Churchill, during his early days in the British Army (c. 1896), was stationed in the Secunderabad Cantonment in the Trimulgherry area.

== Present day ==
The Secunderabad Cantonment Board, informally known as Cantonment, is responsible, among other things, for drinking water, drainage, roads, sewage, garbage disposal, public health, and municipal taxes. The main offices are housed in a British-era building near the edge of the cantonment. The complex also houses a court and the office of the zonal DCP of the Hyderabad city police.

Potable water is supplied to the residents of the cantonment on a fixed delivery timeline, once every two or three days based on the locality.

Laying and maintaining of sewer lines is a function of the SCB and one can often see the workers clearing clogged manholes during a work day.

All house plans need to be approved by the cantonment before the start of any construction. House taxes are collected on a yearly basis and the cantonment sends out bills to the residents. The taxes are paid at the cantonment main office.
