= Joseph Yates (cricketer) =

English cricketer, barrister, and magistrate

Joseph Maghull Yates (19 June 1844 – 17 April 1916) was an English first-class cricketer, later a barrister and magistrate.

Yates was born in Chorlton-cum-Hardy (now a suburb of Manchester) and educated at Westminster School and Trinity College, Cambridge. He played cricket for Cambridge University and appeared in one first-class match in 1866.

While studying at Cambridge Yates was admitted to the Inner Temple and after graduating in 1867 he was called to the bar in 1869. He practised on the Northern Circuit and became a QC in 1893. He was recorder of Salford 1889–1904 and chairman of Quarter Sessions for Salford Hundred. He was also stipendiary magistrate for Manchester 1894–1916. He died in Dunham Woodhouses, Cheshire. His nephew James Yates also played first-class cricket.
