= Secunderabad =

Secunderabad Ulwul
- Twin city Cantonment area
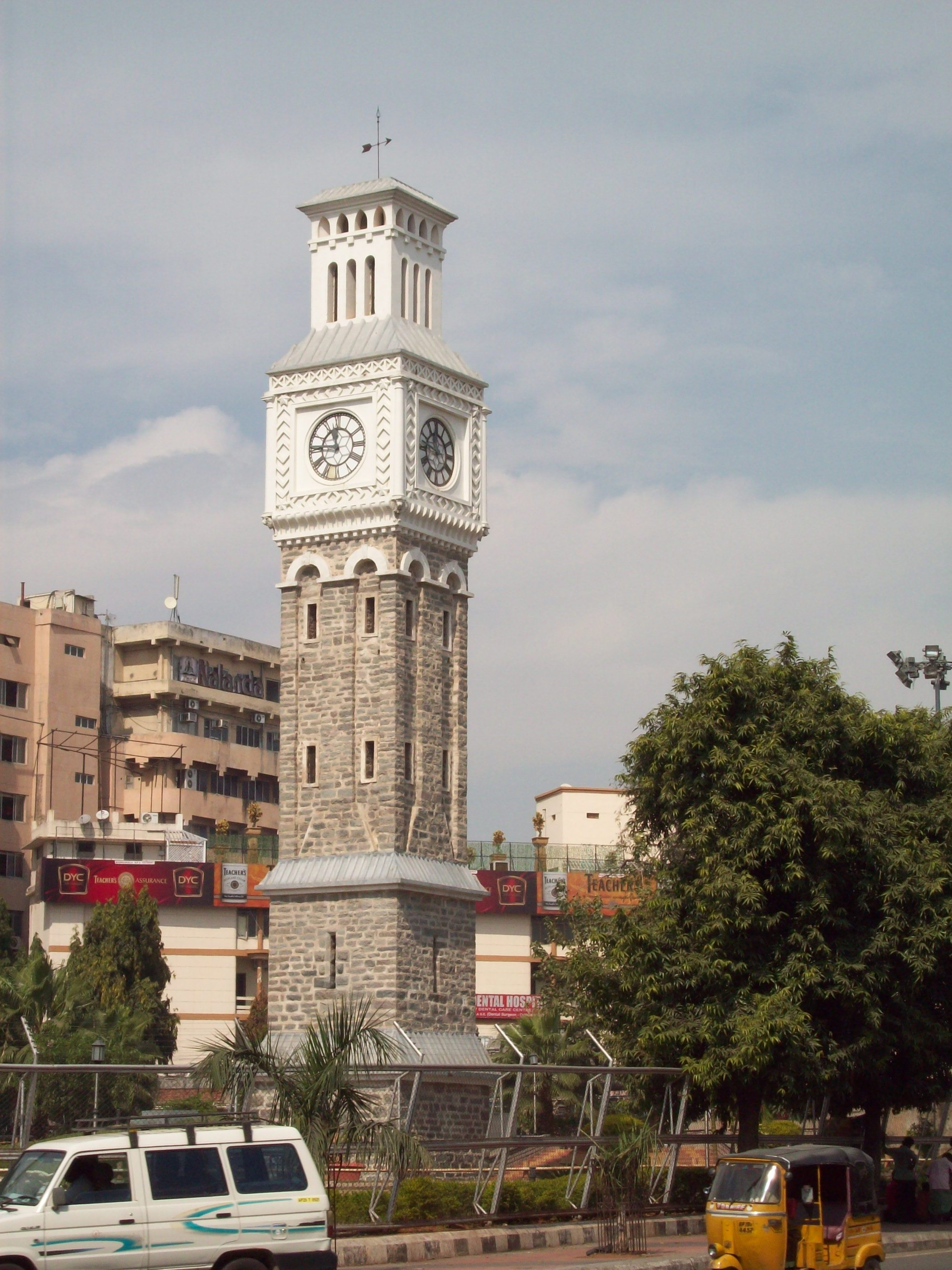
- Secunderabad Clock Tower

- Secunderabad, Telangana. Secunderabad (Telangana) Secunderabad (India)
- Coordinates: 17.439900°N 78.498300°E
- Country: India
- State: Telangana
- District: Hyderabad District
- Metro: Hyderabad Metropolitan Region
- Established: 1806
- Founder: Sikander Jah, Asaf Jah III
- Named for: Sikander Jah, Asaf Jah III

Government
  - Type: Municipal Corporation
  - Body: Greater Hyderabad Municipal Corporation; Secunderabad Cantonment Board
  - MP: G. Kishan Reddy (BJP)
  - MLA: Padma Rao Goud (BRS)

Area
  - Twin city Cantonment area: 64.5 km^{2} (24.9 sq mi)
- Elevation: 561 m (1,841 ft)

Population (2011)
  - Twin city Cantonment area: 213,698
  - Density: 3,310/km^{2} (8,580/sq mi)
  - Metro: 1,000,000

Languages
  - Official: Telugu; English; Urdu
- Time zone: UTC+5:30 (IST)
- Pincode(s): 500 xxx
- Telephone code: 91-040
- Vehicle registration: TS-10/AP 10(Old)
- Website: ghmc.gov.in

Secunderabad (Telugu: [sikənd̪əɾaːbaːd̪(u)]), formerly Ulwul, is a twin city of Hyderabad and one of the six zones of the Greater Hyderabad Municipal Corporation (GHMC) in the Indian state of Telangana. It is the headquarters of the South Central Railway zone. Named after the Mir Akbar Ali Khan Sikander Jah, Asaf Jah III, Nizam of the Asaf Jahi dynasty, Secunderabad was established in 1806 as a British cantonment. Although both the cities are together referred to as the twin cities, Hyderabad and Secunderabad have different histories and cultures, with Secunderabad having developed directly under British rule until 1948, and Hyderabad as the capital of the Nizams' princely state of Hyderabad. Since 1956, the city has housed the Rashtrapati Nilayam, the winter office of the president of India. It is also the headquarters of the 54th Infantry Division of the Indian Army. There are also many residential areas and apartments, particularly in the small neighbourhood of Yapral, with many Indian Armed Forces officials living here.

Geographically divided from Hyderabad by the Hussain Sagar lake, Secunderabad is no longer a separate municipal unit and has become part of Hyderabad's Greater Hyderabad Municipal Corporation. Both cities are collectively known as Hyderabad and together form the sixth-largest metropolis in India. Being one of the largest cantonments in India, Secunderabad has a large presence of army and air force personnel. Secunderabad also has a large number of lakes, with the northern part of the Hussain Sagar Lake being a part of the city and Fox Sagar Lake being the largest lake in Secunderabad. The city also houses the famous Ramoji Film City.

== History ==
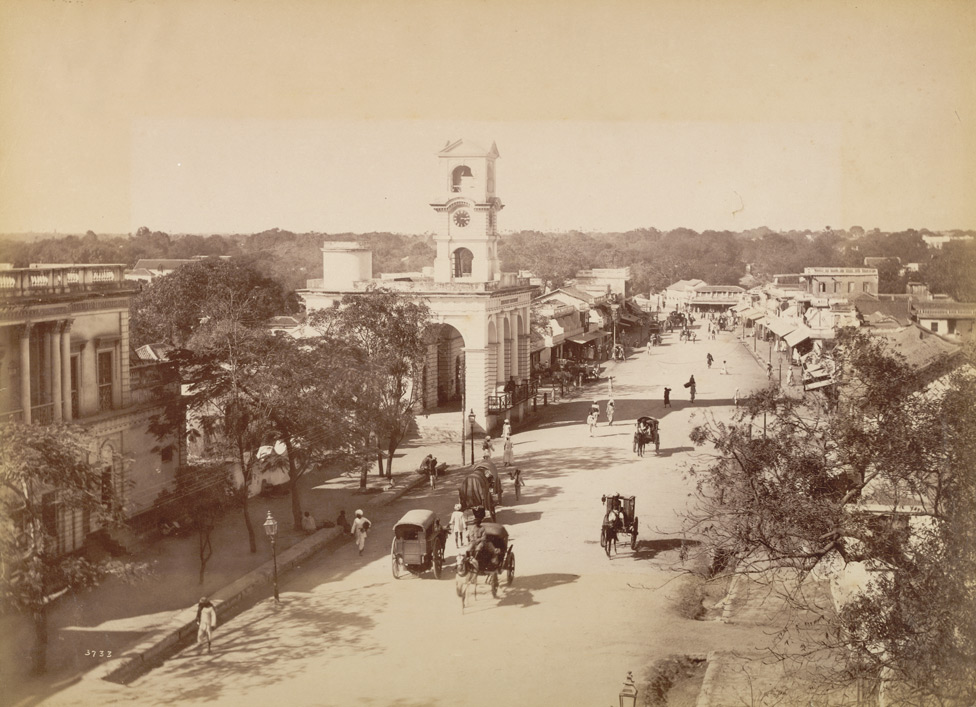
James Street circa 1880, an important shopping district in Secunderabad

Following the dissolution of the Chalukya empire into four parts in the 11th century, the areas around the present-day Hyderabad and Secunderabad came under the control of the Kakatiya dynasty (1158–1310), whose seat of power was at Warangal, 148 km (92 mi) northeast of modern Hyderabad.

In 1310, the area of present-day Hyderabad and Secunderabad came under the rule of the Delhi Sultanate after the capture of Warangal, the Kakatiya capital. The modern city of Hyderabad was built and founded in 1592 by the Golconda Sultanate under Muhammad Quli Qutb Shah. The modern Secunderabad is also the site where the then Mughal emperor Ahmad Shah Bahadur was defeated in the year 1754 by the Maratha Empire; the emperor arrived after the death of Nawab Anwaruddin Khan nearby at the Battle of Ambur in 1749. Anwaruddin Khan was the Nawab of Arcot.

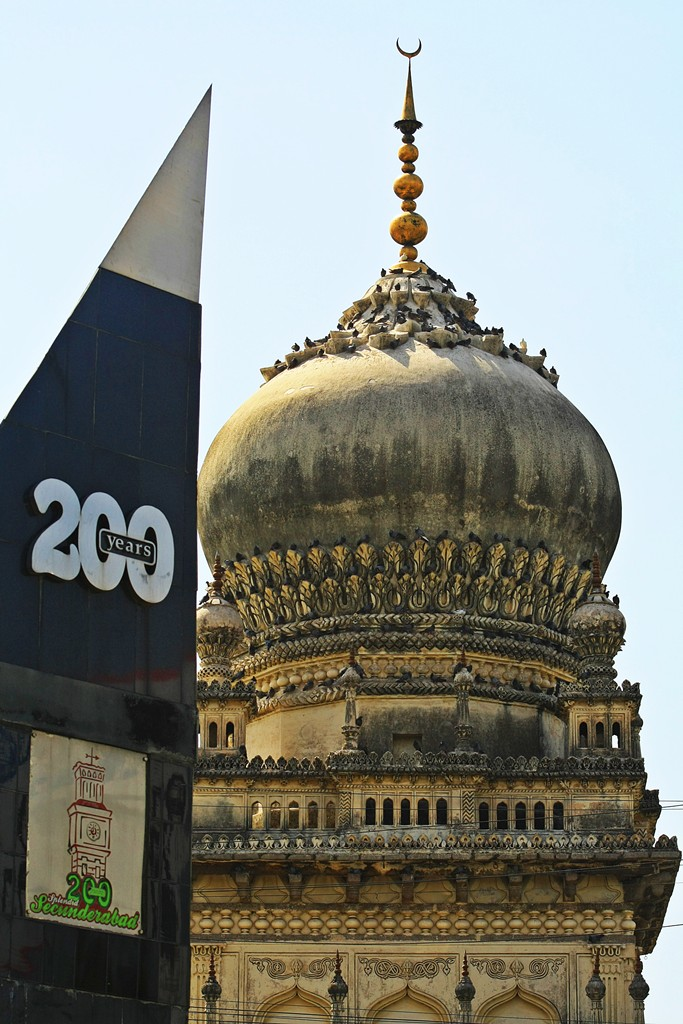
Banner celebrating 200 years of Secunderabad

The area around Secunderabad changed hands among various rulers, and the area was part of Nizam's Hyderabad by the 18th century.

Modern Secunderabad was founded as a British cantonment after Nizam Asaf Jah II was defeated by the British East India Company. He was then forced to sign the 1798 Treaty of Subsidiary Alliance to get the favour of British troops camped in the village of Ulwul, north-east of Hussain Sagar, the lake that separates Secunderabad from its twin city Hyderabad. In 1803, Nizam Sikandar Jah, the third Nizam of Hyderabad, changed Ulwul's name to Secunderabad after himself. The city was formed in 1806, after the order was signed by the Nizam allotting the land north of Hussain Sagar to set up the British Cantonment.

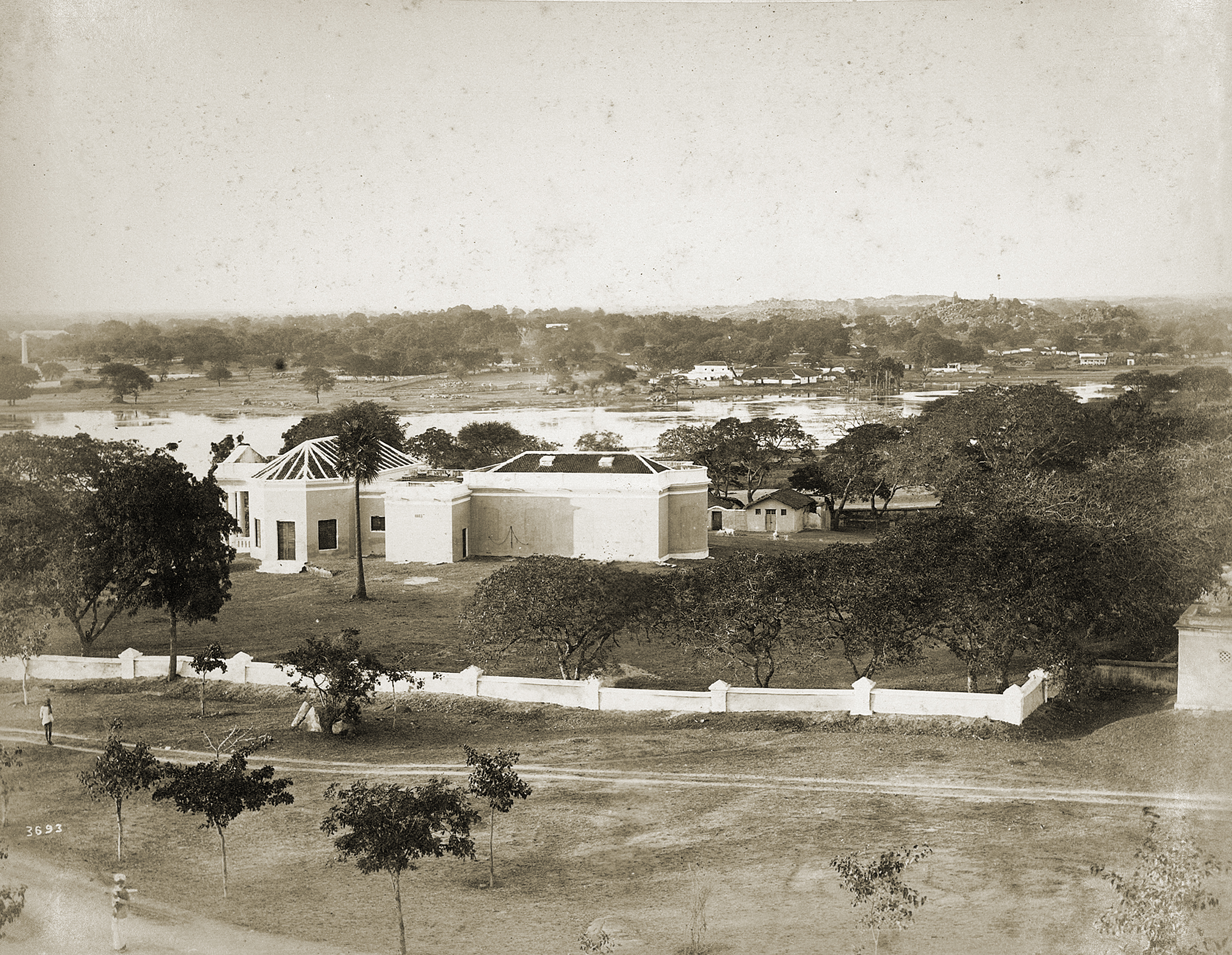
View of St. John's Lodge by the Picket lake in Secunderabad, circa 1890

The drinking water needs of the British army in the cantonment and civilians in the cantonment area (areas now under Marredpally, Bowenpally and Tirumalgherry) were taken from Picket Lake (also known as Picket Tank), and from a few other water bodies. Picket Lake was located at the entrance of the cantonment. Picket Lake was connected to Hussainsagar through a channel. Gradually over the years, the channel turned into a municipal drain. The lake was gradually encroached upon and later a bus station was built in its location.

The twin cities are separated by the man-made Hussain Sagar lake, which was built during the reign of the Qutb Shahi dynasty in the 16th century. Unlike Hyderabad, the official language of Secunderabad was English. Secunderabad was exempted from customs duty on imported goods, thus making trade very profitable. Various new markets such as Regimental Bazaar and General Bazaar were created. After the First War of Indian Independence of 1857, the construction of a 7-metre-high (23 ft) wall was started at Trimulgherry and completed in 1867.

Secunderabad Junction railway station, one of the largest in India and the zonal headquarters of South Central Railway, was established in 1874. The King Edward Memorial Hospital, now known as Gandhi Hospital, was established in 1851. A civil jail (now a heritage building known as Old Jail complex near Monda Market) was also established. Originally constructed in 1860 as the country house of the British Resident at Hyderabad, the Residency House is now known as the Rashtrapati Nilayam, the official retreat of the President of India.

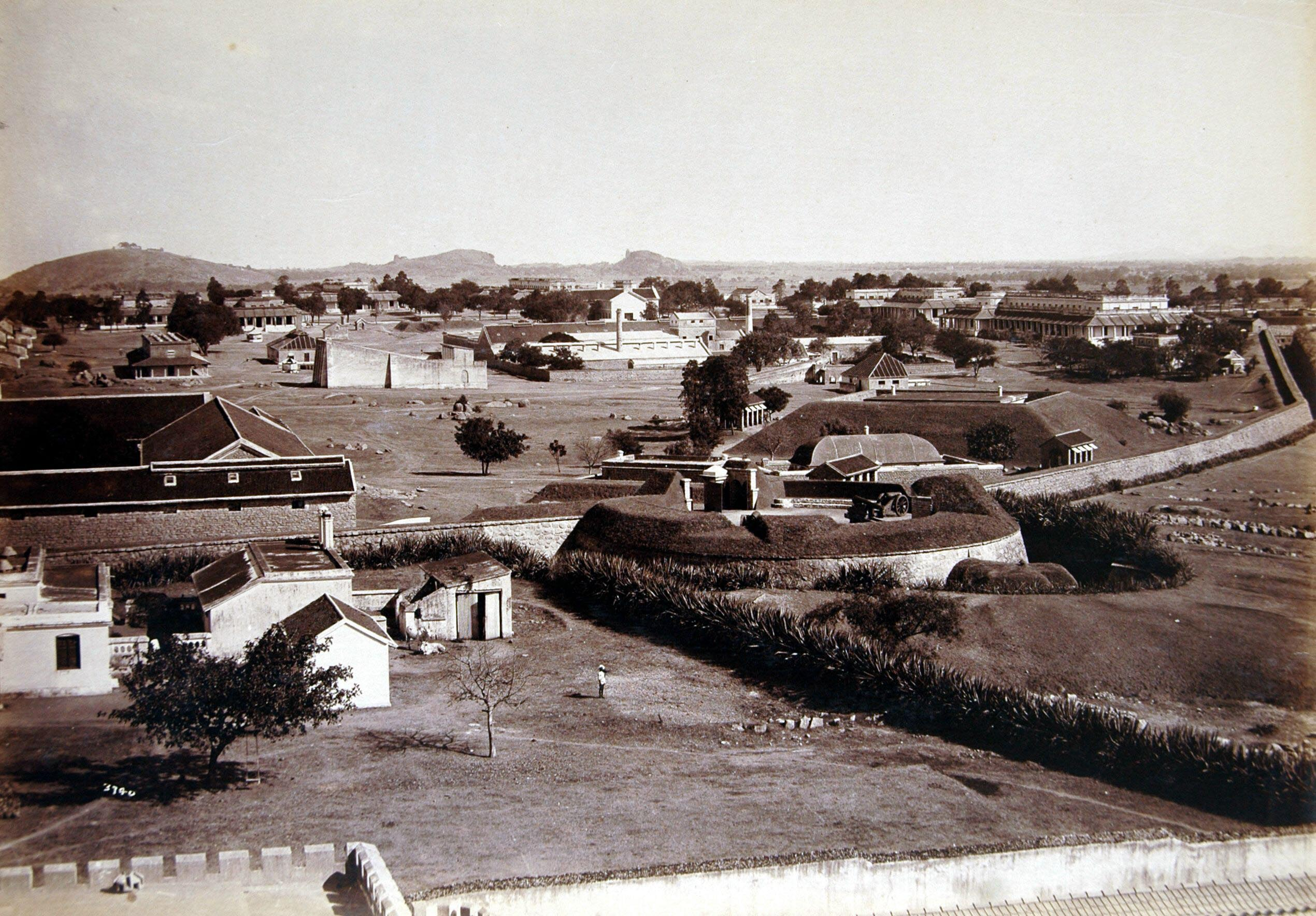
Trimulgherry Entrenchment where British troops were stationed

Sir Winston Churchill, the prime minister of the United Kingdom during World War II, was posted in Secunderabad during the 1890s as a subaltern in the British Army. Sir Ronald Ross conducted his initial research on the cause of malaria in the city of Secunderabad. The original building is today called the Sir Ronald Ross Institute and is located on Minister Road.

Secunderabad Municipality was first formed in 1945. Later in 1950, along with Hyderabad Municipality, it was upgraded to Secunderabad Municipal Corporation under the Hyderabad Corporation Act, 1950. In 1960, by the Hyderabad Municipal Corporation Act of 1955, Secunderabad Municipal Corporation was merged with Hyderabad Corporation to form a single municipal corporation. Today Secunderabad is part of the Hyderabad district.

Post-Independence, the Secunderabad Cantonment Board came under the jurisdiction of the Indian Armed forces. Consequently, large military units were established. The neighbourhoods in Secunderabad include Tarnaka, Paradise Circle, Trimulgherry, Jawaharnagar colony, Marredpally, Jeera, Kalasiguda, General Bazar, Sitaphalmandi, Kharkhana, Ranigunj, Yapral, Kowkur and New Bhoiguda. Begumpet Airport is close to Secunderabad and served the twin city until early 2008.

== Geography ==
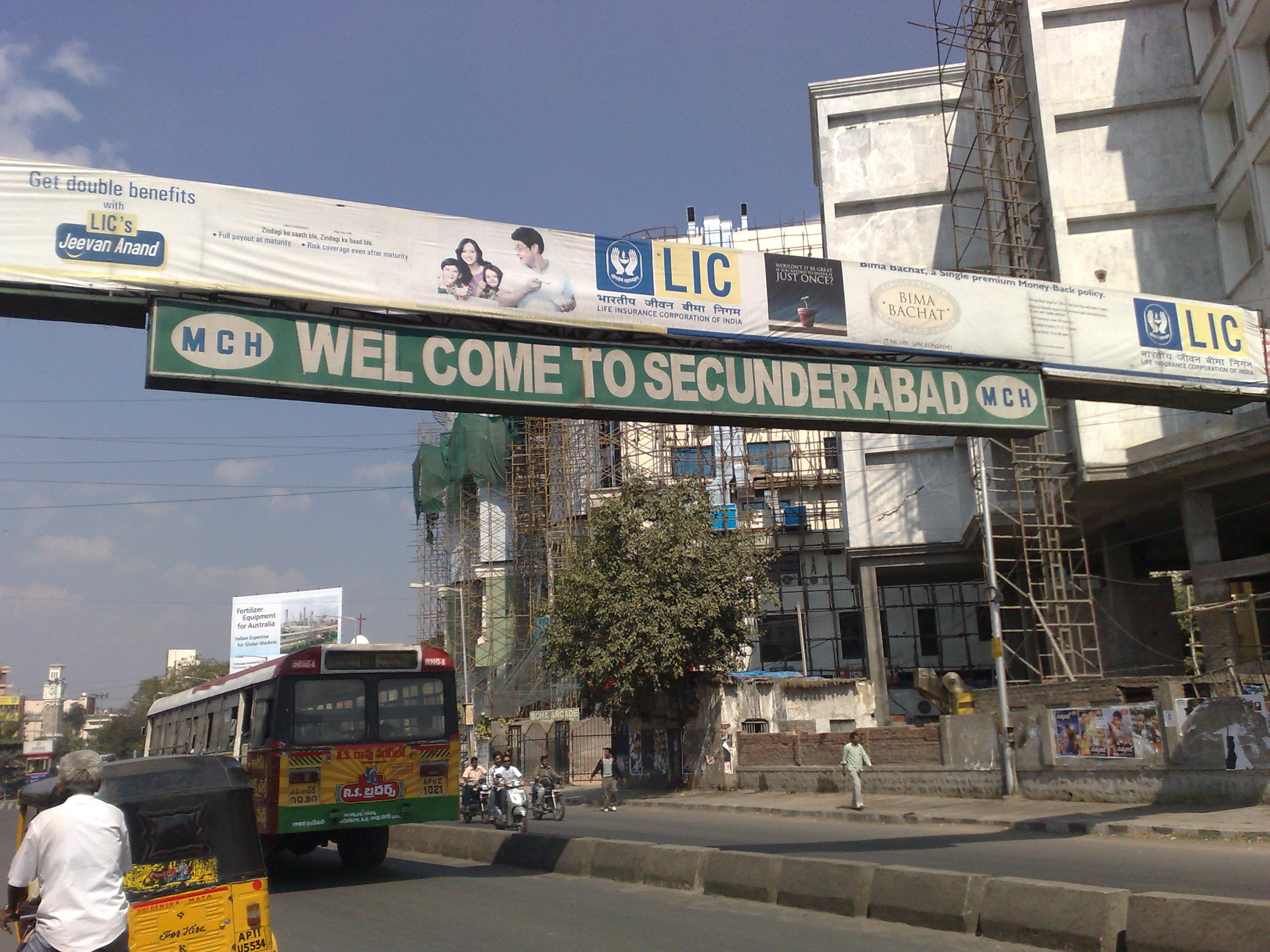
Road sign by MCH

Situated in the North of Hyderabad at 17.45°N 78.5°E, Secunderabad lies on the northern part of the Deccan Plateau. Secunderabad has an average elevation of 543 metres (1781 ft). Most of the area has a rocky terrain and some areas are hilly.

Secunderabad is 1,566 kilometres (973 mi) south of Delhi, 699 kilometres (434 mi) southeast of Mumbai, and 570 kilometres (350 mi) north of Bangalore by road. It is connected to Hyderabad by Rastrapathi Road (formerly known as King's Way) and MG Road (formerly known as James' Street) via Tank Bund. Mettuguda was connected to the James Street by Oxford Street (now renamed as Sarojini Devi road). Sardar Patel Road another major road in Secunderabad that connects Begumpet to Marredpally was once called Alexandra Road. As a constituent of Greater Hyderabad, Secunderabad is one of the largest metropolitan areas in India.

=== Climate ===
Secunderabad has a tropical savanna climate (Köppen: Aw) bordering on a hot semi-arid climate (Köppen: BSh), with hot summers from late March to early May, the monsoon season from late June to early October, and a pleasant winter from late November to early February. In the evenings and mornings, the climate is relatively cool. Most of the rainfall is concentrated in the monsoon months from June to September.

Winter lasts for only about 2 1/2 months, during which the lowest temperature occasionally dips to 10 °C (50 °F) in December and January. May is the hottest month, with average daily lows of 26 °C (79 °F) and highs of 38.8 °C (102 °F). January is the coldest month with average lows of 14.7 °C (58 °F) and highs of 28.6 °C (83 °F).

Climate data for Secunderabad India (1951–1980)
Month	Jan	Feb	Mar	Apr	May	Jun	Jul	Aug	Sep	Oct	Nov	Dec	Year
Mean daily maximum °C (°F)	28.6 (83.5)	31.8 (89.2)	35.2 (95.4)	37.6 (99.7)	38.8 (101.8)	34.4 (93.9)	30.5 (86.9)	29.6 (85.3)	30.1 (86.2)	30.4 (86.7)	28.8 (83.8)	27.8 (82.0)	32.0 (89.6)
Mean daily minimum °C (°F)	14.7 (58.5)	17.0 (62.6)	20.3 (68.5)	24.1 (75.4)	26.0 (78.8)	23.9 (75.0)	22.5 (72.5)	22.0 (71.6)	21.7 (71.1)	20.0 (68.0)	16.4 (61.5)	14.1 (57.4)	20.2 (68.4)
Average precipitation mm (inches)	3.2 (0.13)	5.2 (0.20)	12.0 (0.47)	21.0 (0.83)	37.3 (1.47)	96.1 (3.78)	163.9 (6.45)	171.1 (6.74)	185.5 (7.30)	90.9 (3.58)	16.2 (0.64)	6.1 (0.24)	812.5 (31.99)

== Administration ==
- Secunderabad City
- Secunderabad Cantonment Board

== Demographics ==
As per the 2011 census report, males constituted 51% of the population and females 49%. Secunderabad had an average literacy rate of 73%, male literacy was 78%, and female literacy was 68%. 11% of the population was under 6 years of age. The city has a sizable population of Anglo-Indians, who mainly resided in the South Lallaguda area of Secunderabad which was popularly known as Little England. Many Anglo-Indians have emigrated to other countries in the English-speaking world over the last few decades.

== Culture ==
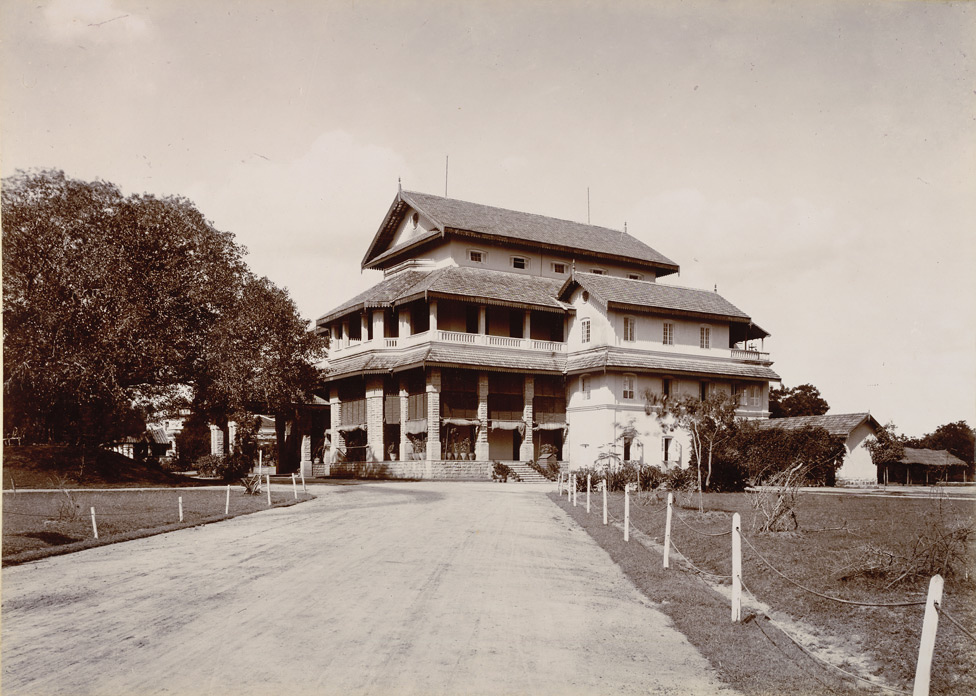
Secunderabad Club c.1902

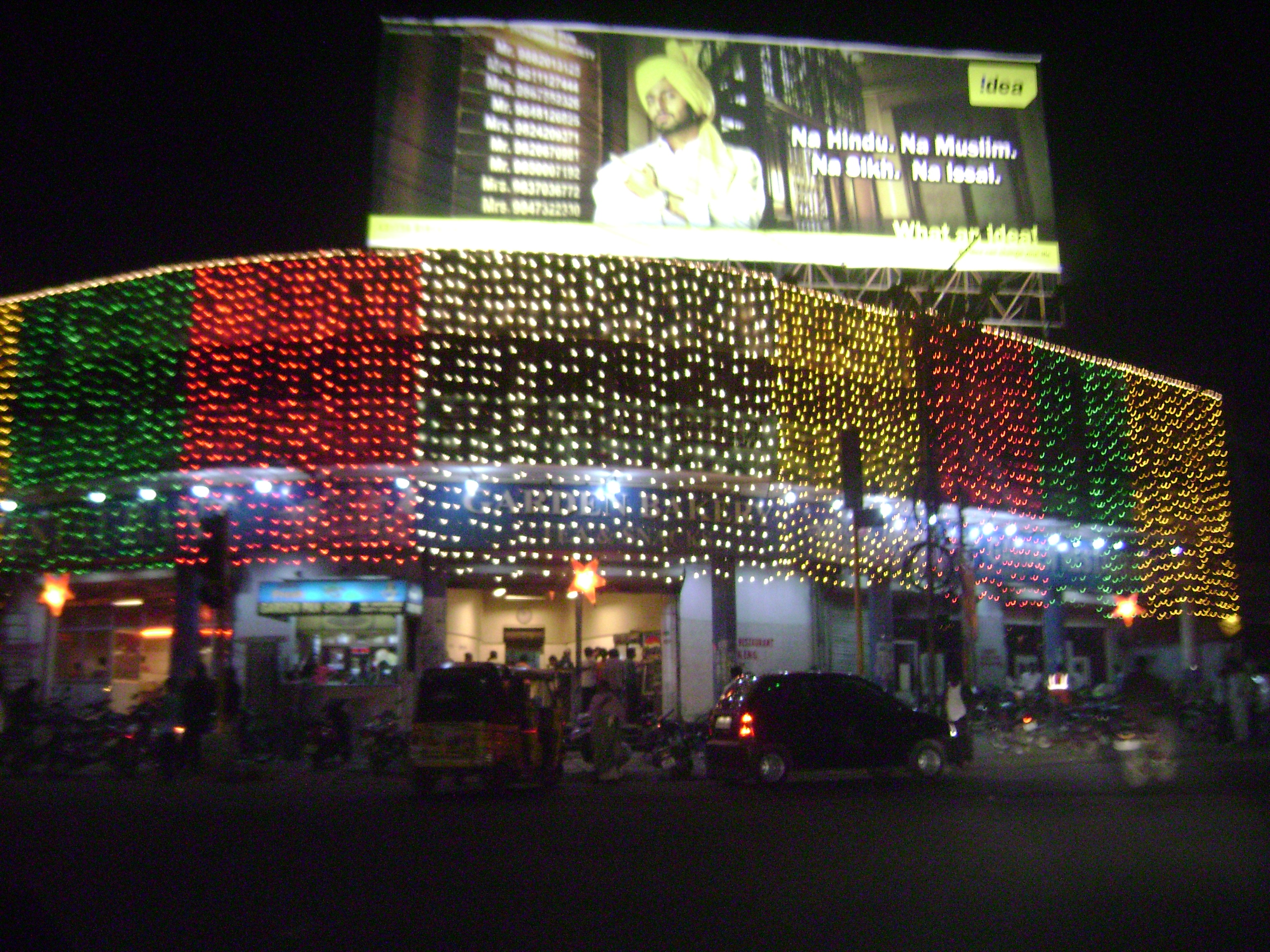
Garden Restaurant established 1952, opposite to the Clock Tower

The camp transformed into an English town, and then into a truly cosmopolitan city where the Anglo-Indians, who had a colony popularly called "Little England", rubbed shoulders with the Mudaliars of Tamil Nadu, the Rajasthani trading community, the Parsis, and the Sikhs, as the historian Narendra Luther book Laskar vividly captures the flavour in the chapter, "Colours of the rainbow".

Due to the presence of communities such as Parsis and Anglo-Indians alongside British and native inhabitants, Secunderabad was historically a cosmopolitan city. Secunderabad used to be referred to by the locals as Lashkar, meaning the army and the city's culture reflected the same. Secunderabad was a liberal city compared to Hyderabad due to the presence of the British.

The popular Secunderabad Club was established in 1878, at a country house gifted by Salar Jung I. Secunderabad has a more laid-back atmosphere because it is mainly a residential area with fewer government offices and corporate establishments. On 16 January 2022, a massive fire engulfed most of the Secunderabad Club, destroying many iconic structures. The club is also one of the oldest clubs in India.

Many outdoor events such as the Republic Day parade and fairs are held in the Gymkhana or Parade grounds. Christmas is celebrated by the Christian residents. An annual festival known as the Bonalu is celebrated by the Hindus of the Telangana state. It is usually held during the Ashadha, which is at the start of the monsoon season. Ramadan, the Islamic holy month of fasting, is observed by the local Muslims. There are old temples like Laxminarayana Swami Temple and Mahakali Temple. Local churches like Wesley church and St. Mary's church add to the cosmopolitan culture of the city. Many mosques can be found in Secunderabad, serving the Muslim population of the city. The culture of Secunderabad is distinctly different from that of Hyderabad's Nawabi culture.

=== Cinemas in Secunderabad ===
Some of the popular cinemas in Secunderabad were Sangeet, Tivoli, Anand, Natraj, Ajanta etc. These cinemas were also popular landmarks in the city. However, most of these cinemas are either closed or transformed. Sangeet was a popular cinema theatre that screened only American movies. Plaza Cinema was the only theatre in India where viewers could sip a beer while watching a movie.

== Economy ==
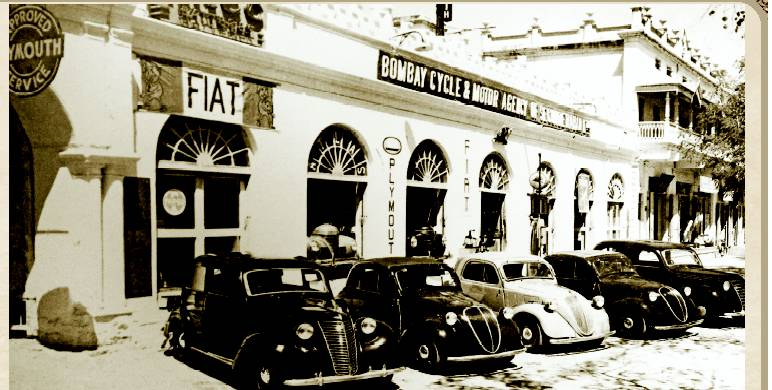
The first car showroom that was opened in Secunderabad in 1912 at James Street, c. 1950

ITC, Infosys, Intergraph, and Coromandel International are some of the major private companies that have their offices in Secunderabad. Being the headquarters of South Central Railway, Secunderabad is a major centre for railway activity. Industrial areas such as Bolarum, Moula-Ali, Nacharam, Ghatkesar, Uppal, etc. are in Secunderabad. Secunderabad Cantonment Board houses a large number of defence units. Units of the Department of Atomic Energy (DAE), such as Atomic Minerals Directorate for Exploration and Research (AMD), Nuclear Fuel Complex (NFC), and ECIL are close to Secunderabad. There are also many hotels here, like Taj Krishna and ITC hotels.

== Government ==
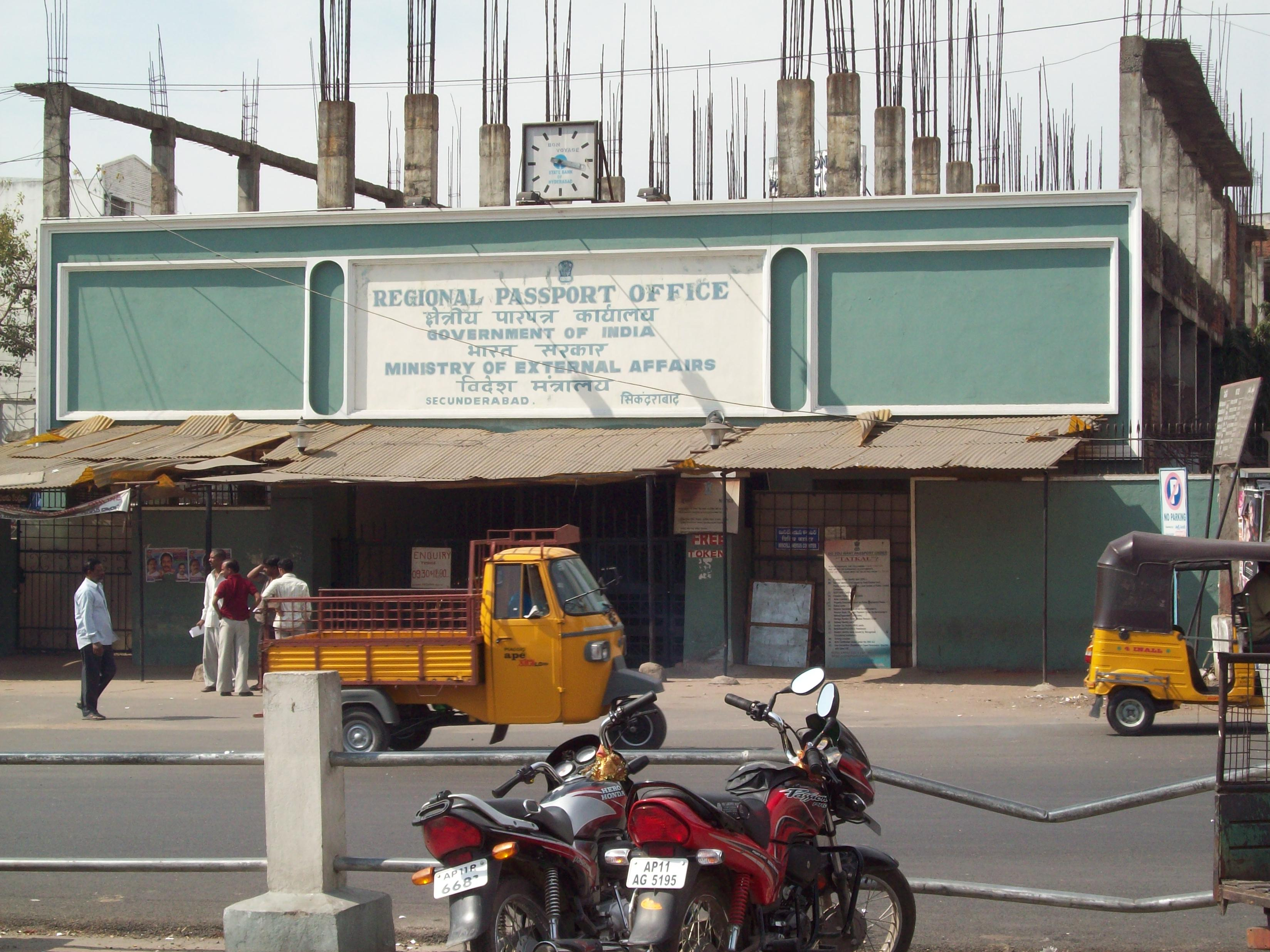
Regional passport office in Secunderabad

The Greater Hyderabad Municipal Corporation (GHMC), established in 2007, is responsible for the administration and infrastructure of Secunderabad. Secunderabad Municipality was first formed in 1945. Later in 1950, along with Hyderabad Municipality, it was upgraded to Secunderabad Municipal Corporation under the Hyderabad Corporation Act of 1950. In 1960, by the Hyderabad Municipal Corporation Act of 1955, Secunderabad Municipal Corporation was merged with Hyderabad Corporation to form a single Municipal Corporation. During Nizam's period, Secunderabad Cantonment was under the control of the British Raj. Today those areas, and most parts of Secunderabad where defence installations are located, are under the purview of Secunderabad Cantonment Board. There are eight civilian wards in Secunderabad Cantonment Board, with a population of four lakh.

The Secunderabad Municipality office which was located on Sardar Patel Road is to be demolished for the metro rail project. The new office is located at West Marredpally.

Secunderabad forms a part of Secunderabad Lok Sabha constituency and is represented with seven legislative assembly seats. The present Member of Parliament is G. Kishan Reddy, who is also a Minister of State in the Union Cabinet.

== Media ==
Major English dailies Deccan Chronicle and Financial Chronicle are published from Secunderabad. FM radio Radio Mirchi is located at SP Road in Secunderabad.

== Sports ==
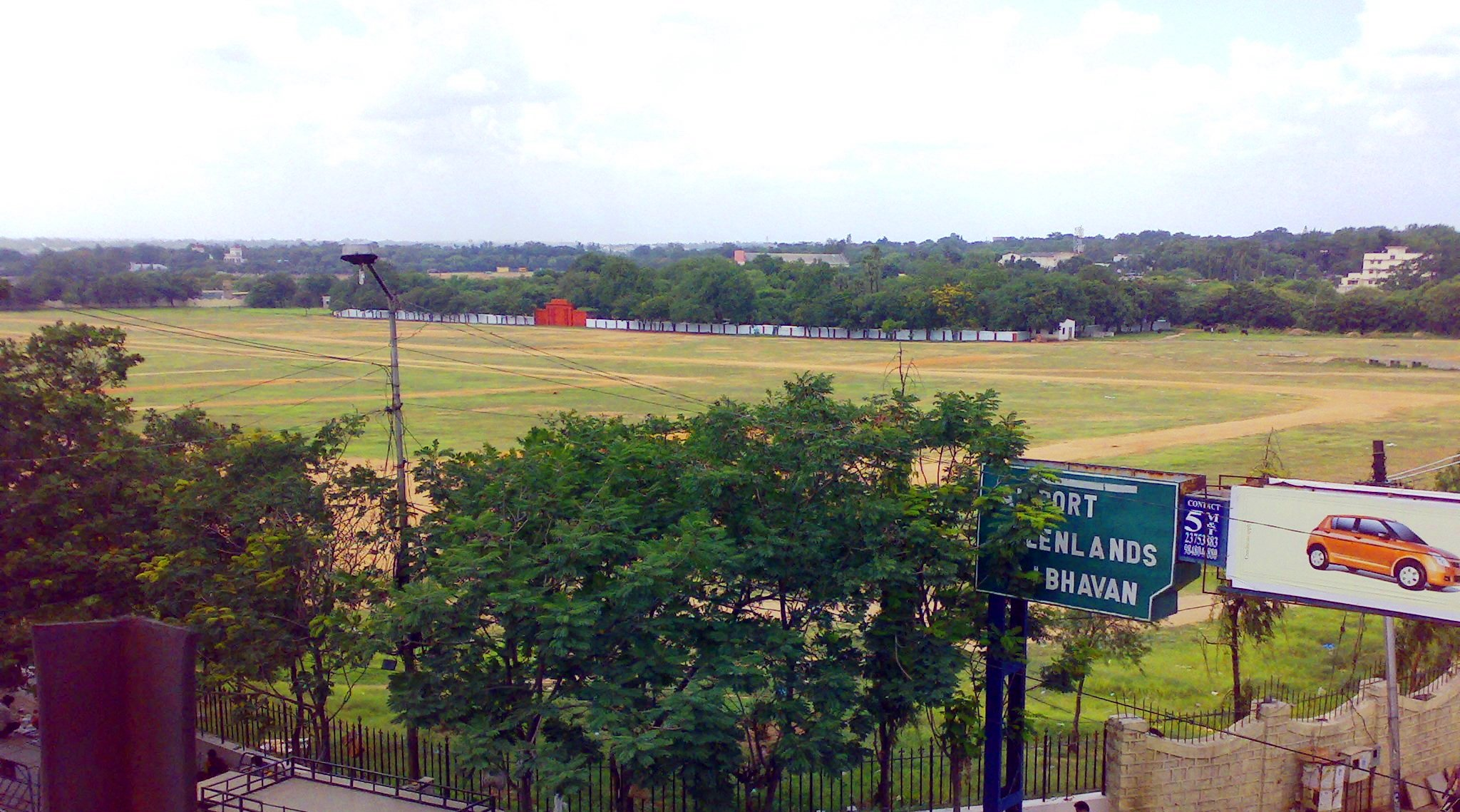
Parade grounds in Secunderabad

The most-popular sport played in Secunderabad is cricket. During pre-independence era Secunderabad had various sports facilities built for serving Englishmen. Presently, no major stadiums are located in Secunderabad. However, some open grounds belonging to railways and military establishments are used for various sporting activities. These are Gymkhana Ground, Parade Ground, Polo Ground, Bollarum Golf Course and Railway Golf Course.

Various state sports associations such as Amateur Boxing Association, Basketball Association, Women's Cricket Association, Sculling and Rowing Association, and Hyderabad Hockey Association are located in Secunderabad.

== Transport ==
Secunderabad Railway Station, the busiest rail and bus junction in the city

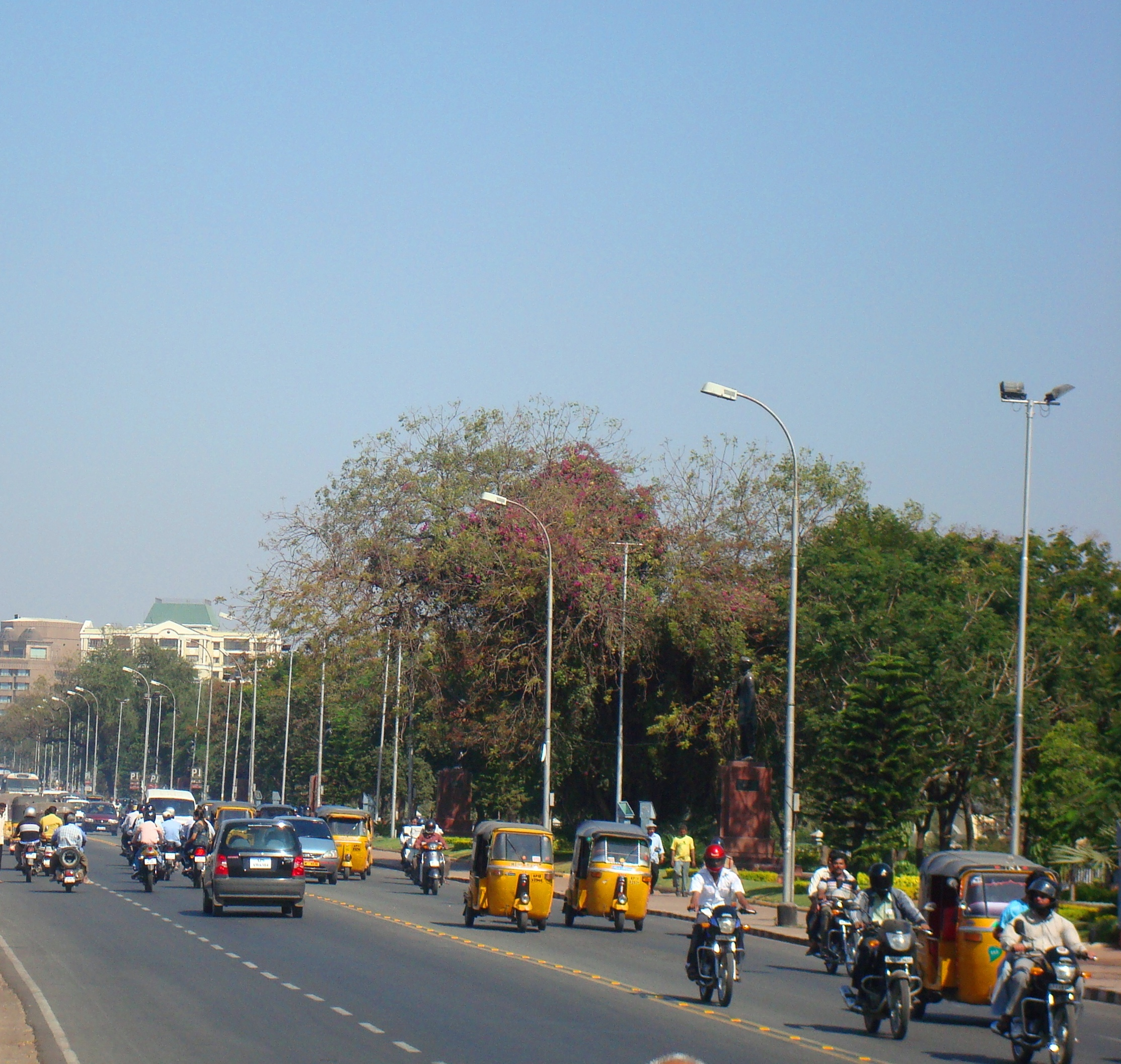
Tank Bund road, an important road which connects the cities of Secunderabad and Hyderabad

The most commonly used forms of medium-distance transport in Secunderabad include government-owned services such as light railways and Telangana State Road Transport Corporation (TSRTC) buses, as well as privately operated auto rickshaws. It is connected by Secunderabad East metro station & Secunderabad West metro station of Hyderabad Metro.

The city is the headquarters of the South Central Railway Zone of the Indian Railways. It is served by Secunderabad Railway Station, one of the oldest and largest railway stations in the twin cities. Secunderabad is also a major railway junction in the Wadi–Vijayawada railway route.

Secunderabad is the hub for the city bus transport run by the TSRTC and is connected to major destinations of both Hyderabad and Secunderabad. Major bus stations are the Jubilee Bus Station and the Rathifile Bus.

The Tank Bund road connects Hyderabad and Secunderabad. Abutting the Hussain Sagar lake, the Tank Bund road is an arterial road and the main thoroughfare connecting Secunderabad with Hyderabad. Maximum speed limits within the city are 50 km/h (31 mph) for two-wheelers and cars, 35 km/h (22 mph) for auto rickshaws and 40 km/h (25 mph) for light commercial vehicles and buses.

The nearest airport is Rajiv Gandhi International Airport in Hyderabad, Begumpet Airport having closed in 2008. TGSRTC Buses are run from Secunderabad to RGIA.

== Education ==
Schools in Secunderabad, similar to other schools in Hyderabad and other parts of Telangana follow a 10+2+3 plan. Schools are a mix of publicly and privately run institutions, with two-thirds of students in private schools. Languages of instruction include English, Hindi, Urdu, and Telugu. Depending on the institution students are studying in, they are required to sit in the Secondary School Certificate or the Indian Certificate of Secondary Education. After completing secondary education, students enrol in schools or junior colleges with a higher secondary facility. Due to the prolonged presence of the British, Secunderabad has convent schools established by Christian missionaries. There are also 2 Army Public Schools, Army Public School Bolarum and Army Public School RK Puram.

Research institutes such as National Institute of Nutrition, Center for Cellular and Molecular Biology, Indian Institute of Chemical Technology, The English and Foreign Languages University, Osmania University, and National Geophysical Research Institute are in Tarnaka, which is close to Secunderabad.

== Notable people ==
- Gummadi Vittal Rao, Poet Writer, revolutionary Telugu balladeer and local activist from pre-independence.
- Dasaradhi Rangacharya, Telugu Writer, Sahitya Akademi Award winner.
- Sunil Chhetri, most-capped Indian international footballer and the all-time top goalscorer.
- Shyam Benegal, film director and screenwriter
- M. L. Jaisimha, test cricketer and TV commentator
- Diana Hayden, 1997 Femina Miss India and 1997 Miss World winner
- Padmapriya Janakiraman, film actress and model
- Tanikella Bharani, actor, writer and film director
- K. N. T. Sastry, writer and film director, film critic and journalist
- James Yates, English cricketer
- Tharun Bhascker, actor, writer and film director
- Ajith Kumar, Tamil film actor
- Kenneth Anderson, Hunter, writer and conservationist
- H. P. Newsholme, physician and writer
- Ann Firbank

== See also ==
- Greater Hyderabad Municipal Corporation h
