= Marredpally =

Marredpally Marredpally Mandal
- neighbourhood
- Location in Hyderabad, India Marredpally (India)
- Coordinates: 17°26′52.03″N 78°30′31.44″E
- Country: India
- State: Telangana
- District: Hyderabad
- City: Secunderabad
- Zone: none

Government
  - Body: Cantonment Board GHMC

Languages
  - Official: Telugu
- Time zone: UTC+5:30 (IST)
- PIN: 500 026
- Vehicle registration: TG
- Lok Sabha constituency: Secunderabad
- Vidhan Sabha constituency: Secunderabad
- Planning agency: Cantonment Board GHMC
- Website: telangana.gov.in

Marredpally is a residential suburb in the city of Secunderabad, a Mandal in the Hyderabad District in the Indian state of Telangana. It is divided into East Marredpally and West Marredpally.

== Demographics ==
The number of registered voters is 43,837.

== Transport ==
TSRTC connects Marredpally to many parts of the city. The closest MMTS Train Station is Secunderabad. The nearest railway station is Secunderabad.

The nearest Metro station for Marredpally is Parade Ground Station, which is also an intersection of two lines of Hyderabad Metro.

== Notable ==
- J. Geeta Reddy (born 1947), ex-Minister for Major Industries, Sugar, Commerce & Export Promotion
- Sarvey Sathyanarayana, ex-Minister for R&B
- Chief Justice N. Kumarayya, of Andhra Pradesh High Court; judge of International Tribunal at the World Bank
- Mudigonda Markandeya (born 1928), retired District Sessions Judge; also appointed by the Government as One Man Commission of Inquiry
