= ECIL Bus Station =

Bus station in Telangana, India

ECIL Bus Station ఇ.సి.ఐ.ఏల్ బస్ స్టేషన్
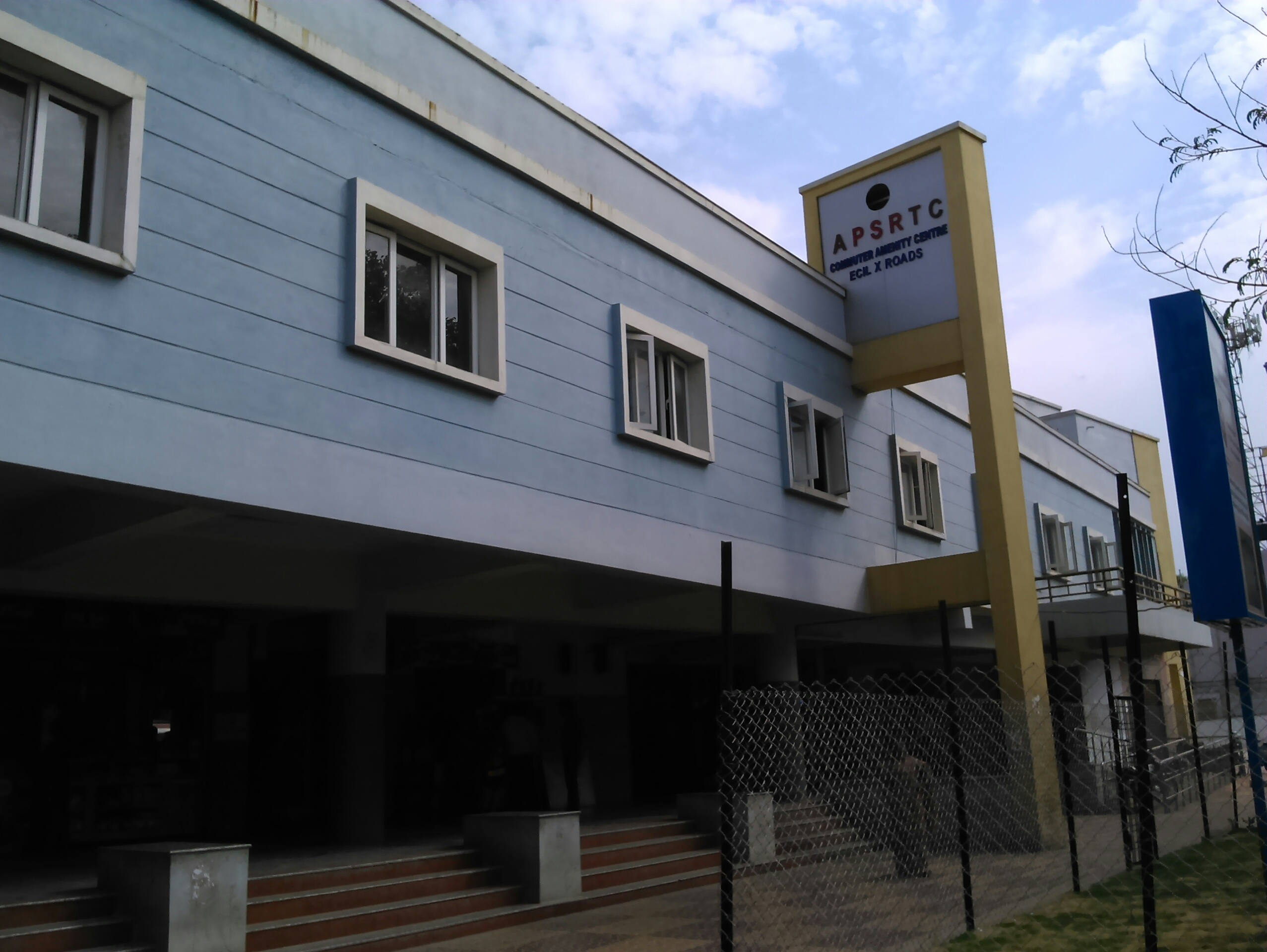
- ECIL Bus Station

General information
- Location: Kamala Nagar, Kushaiguda Secunderabad, Telangana
- Coordinates: 17.472402°N 78.569907°E
- System: Terminus
- Owner: Telangana State Road Transport Corporation
- Platforms: 2
- Bus routes: ECIL - Alwal - Medchal, ECIL - JBS, ECIL- Neredmet- Malkajgiri - Secunderabad, ECIL-Afzalgunj, ECIL-Mehedipatnam, ECIL-Keesara, Secunderabad – Kushaiguda.; ECIL – Medchal; ECIL – Hitech City; ECIL – Ghatkesar

Construction
- Parking: Yes
- Cycle facilities: Yes

Other information
- Station code: ECIL

History
- Opened: October 2010
Location

ECIL Bus Station, commonly known as ECIL Bus Stop, is a terminal bus station located in Kamala Nagar, Kushaiguda Secunderabad, Telangana. It was constructed in 2010 and is one of the major bus stations in Hyderabad and Secunderabad.

== Services ==
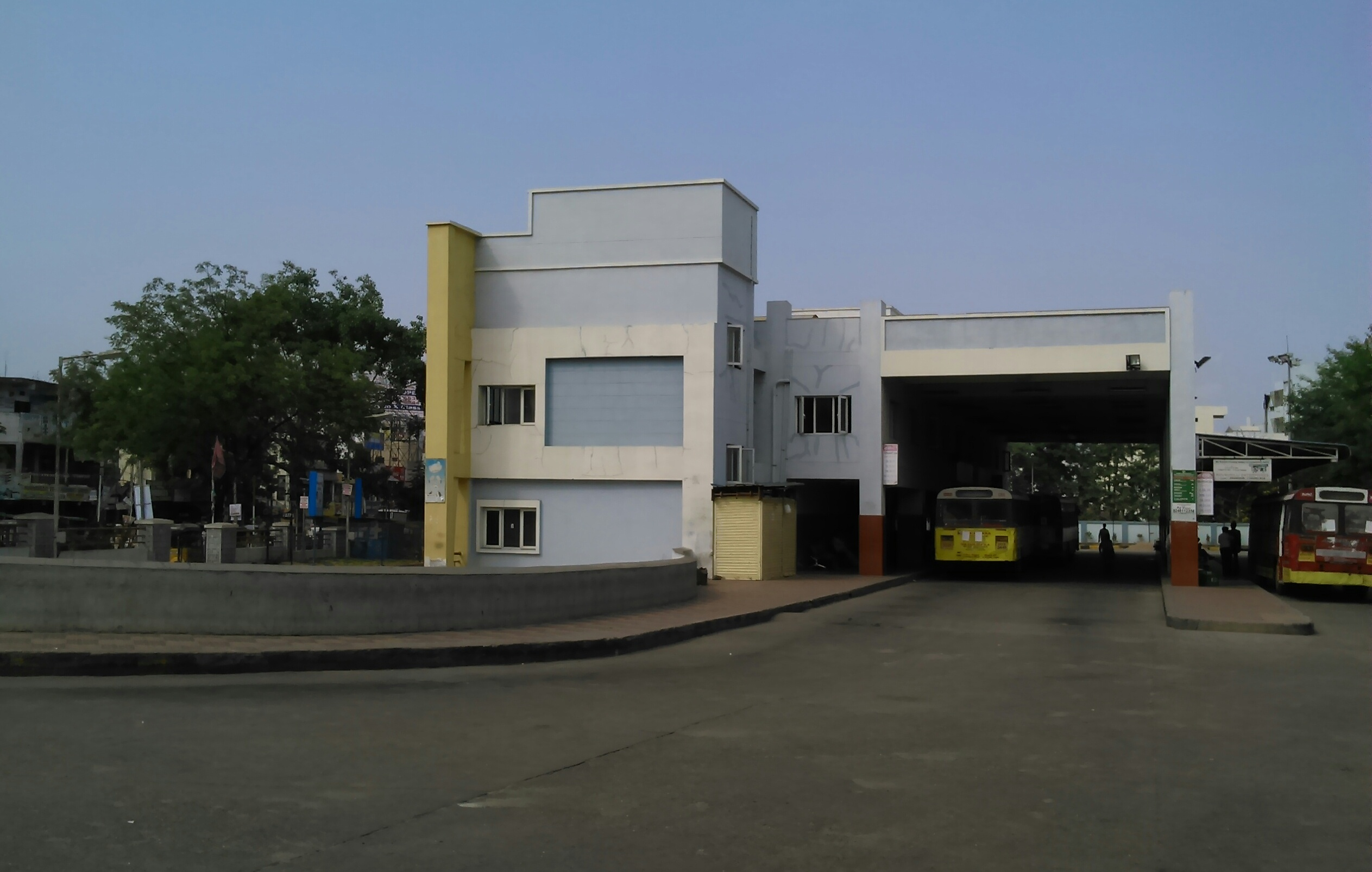
Side view of the station

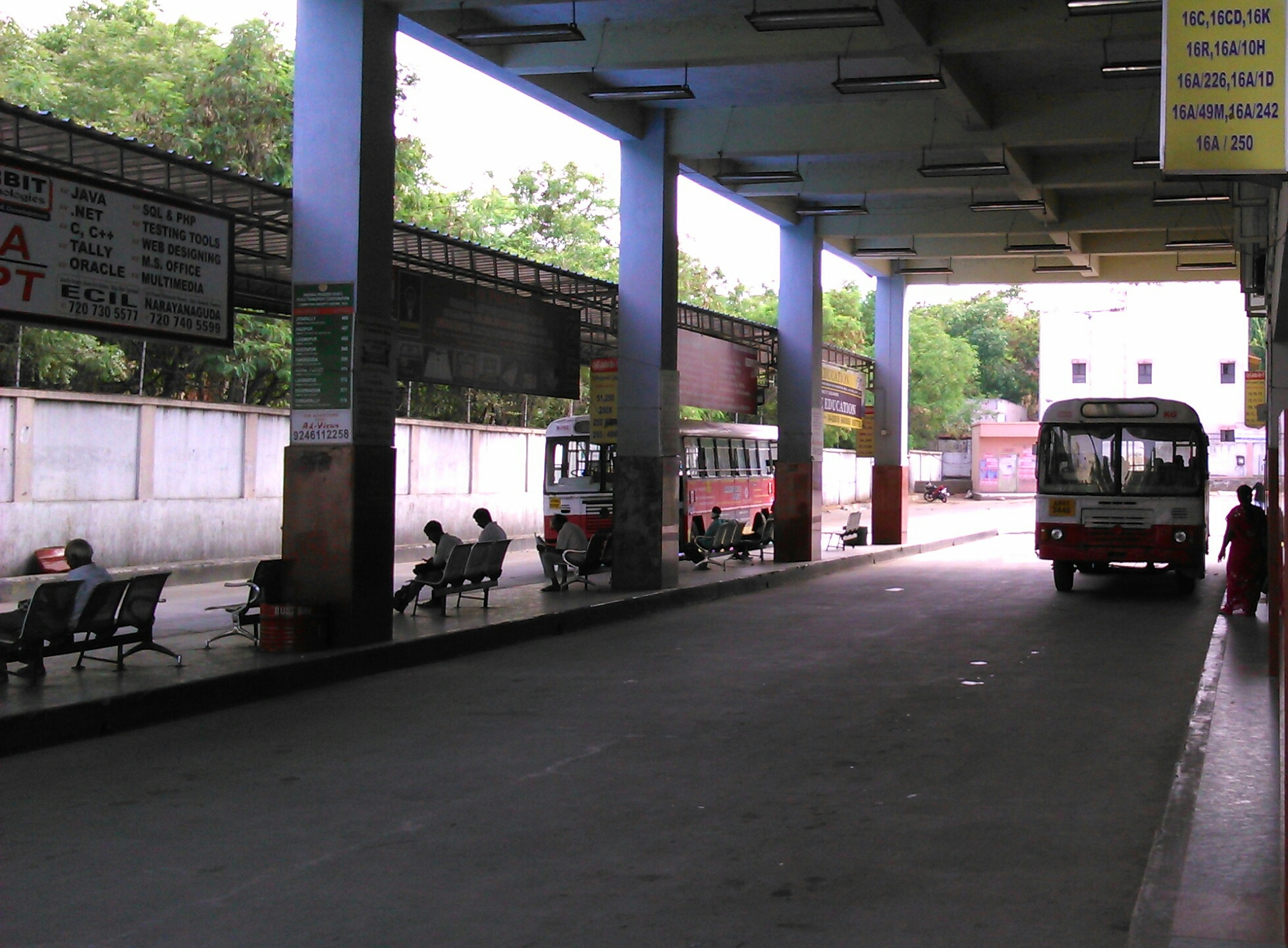
Platforms of ECIL bus station.

ECIL Bus Station features two platforms, one for Secunderabad-bound buses and one for all other buses, most of which serve the Hyderabad region. The station serves several thousand people from Kamala Nagar, ECIL, A. S. Rao Nagar, Moula-Ali, Kapra, Neredmet, and Kushaiguda every day.

== See also ==
- Telangana State Road Transport Corporation
- One stop
