= Moula Ali =

- Neighborhood
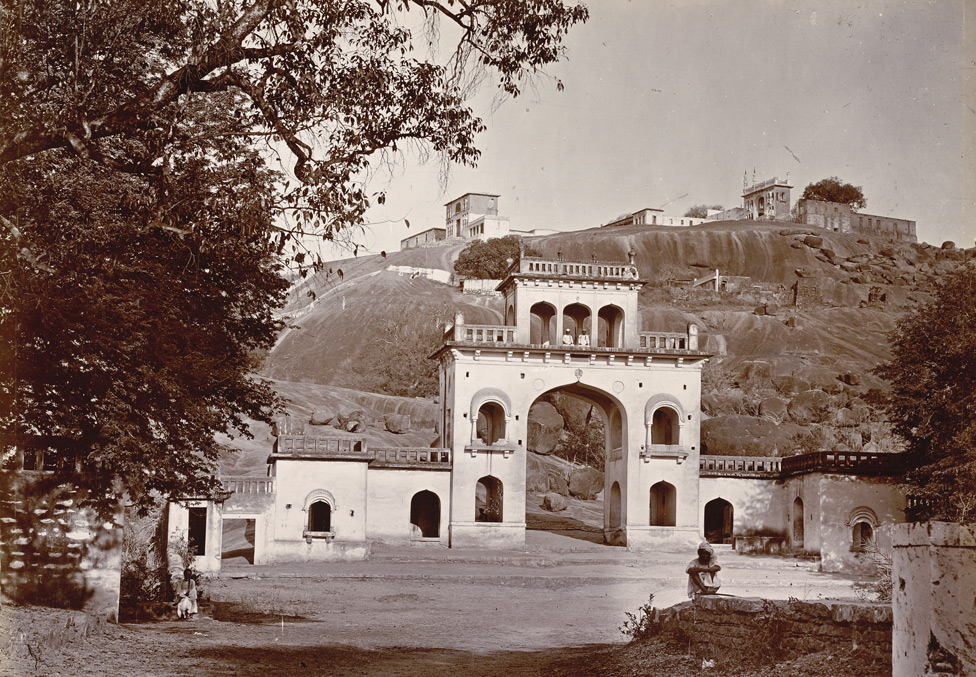
- View of Moula Ali Hill, circa 1902

- Location in Hyderabad, India Moula Ali (India)
- Coordinates: 17°28′5″N 78°33′22″E
- Country: India
- State: Telangana
- District: Medchal-Malkajgiri district
- Mandal Circle: Malkajgiri Mandal Malkajgiri GHMC Circle No.28
- City/Metropolitan Area: Secunderabad, Hyderabad Metropolitan Development Authority
- Court: X Metropolitan Magistrate Court Malkajgiri at Neredmet
- Police Station: Malkajgiri PS
- Founded: AD 1578 (448 years ago)
- Founder: Nizam
- Named for: Ali the husband of Fatima, daughter of the Prophet Mohammed PBAH.

Government
  - Type: Municipal Corporation
  - Body: GHMC Malkajgiri Circle

Languages
  - Official: Telugu, Urdu
- Time zone: UTC+5:30 (IST)
- PIN Code: Moula Ali - 500040
- Telephone code: +9140
- Lok Sabha constituency: Malkajgiri
- Civic agency: GHMC
- Vidhan Sabha constituency: Malkajgiri

Moula-Ali commonly known as Moula Ali. It is a well-developed industrial and urban area in Malkajgiri Mandal, of the Medchal-Malkajgiri district, it is a part of Greater Hyderabad and also a part of Hyderabad Metropolitan Region of the Indian state of Telangana. This area is well connected with rail transportation through the Moula Ali Railway Station. It is noted for its Moula Ali hill, on top of which stands the Moula Ali Dargah and mosque, dedicated to Ali.

This was built during the era of the Qutb Shahi rulers. The Moula Ali Dargah is one of the 11 heritage sites identified by the Heritage Conservation Committee of HUDA. It is basically a large rocky area, with undulating terrain. There is another hillock opposite the Moula Ali Hill, called "Qadam-e-Rasool" on which the sacred relics of the Prophet were supposedly deposited by Mohammad Shakrullah Rehan, a servant of Mir Nizam Ali Khan, the second nizam of Asaf Jahi dynasty.

== History ==
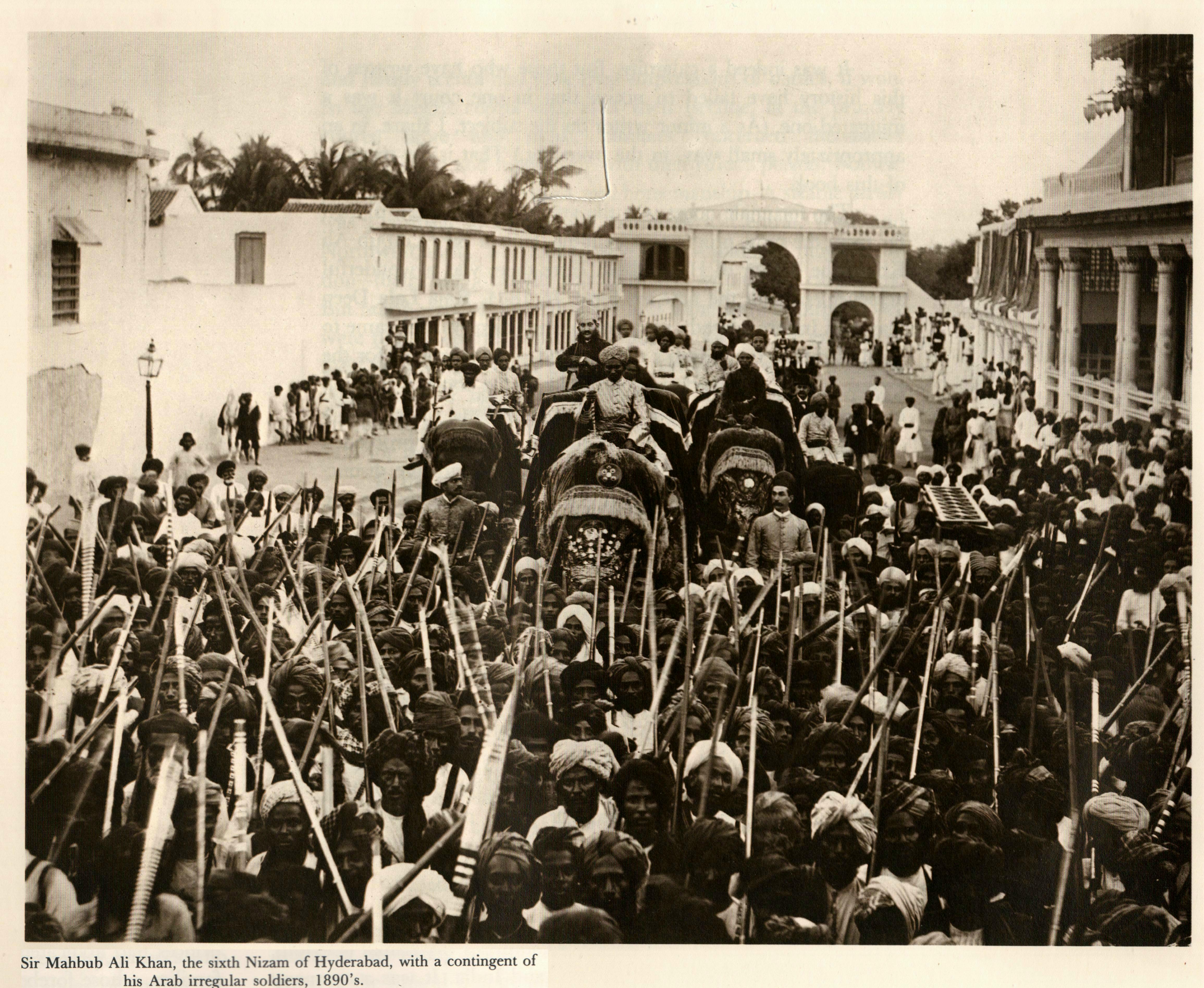
The Nizam VI riding an elephant in a procession from Moula Ali, circa 1895 with Moula Ali Kaman in the background

Archaeological evidence indicates human habitation in Moula Ali since the megalithic period, including iron-age burial sites first excavated in 1935.

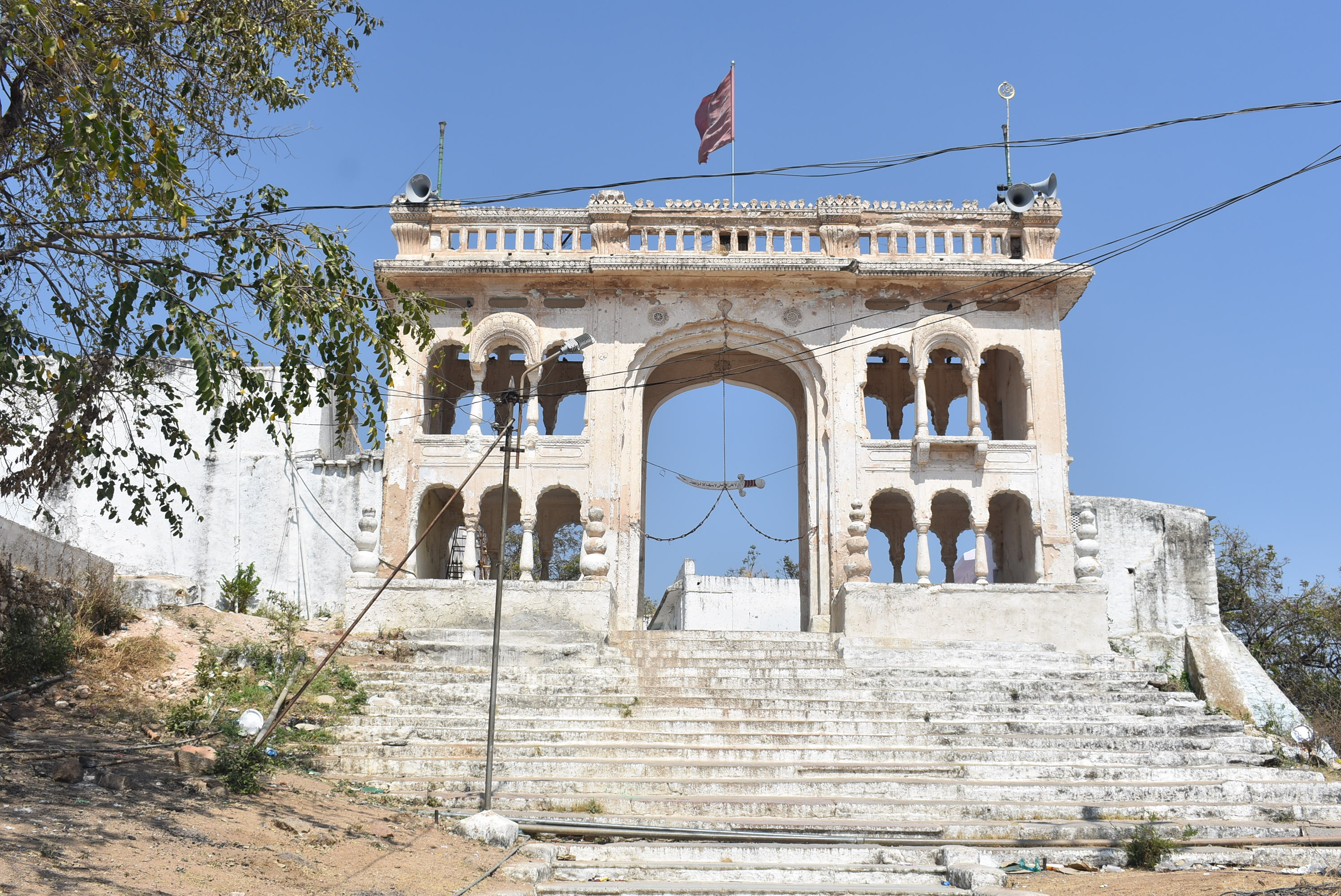
Moula-Ali dargah

Iron Age burial sites have been discovered in Moula-Ali. The earliest excavations were carried out in 1935 by the then-Department of Archaeology of the Nizam's Dominion. During the Nizam era, Moula-Ali was a very prominent area, with places like the Hyderabad Race Club located here. Later in 1886 it was shifted to Malakpet. This shift was carried out for the convenience of H.H. Nawab Mir Mahboob Ali Khan, the VI^{th} Nizam (seen in the picture on left with Moula Ali Kaman in the background).

Maula Ali Dargah and Maula Ali Arch of Hyderabad came into existence during the Qutb Shahi dynasty. According to British historian William Dalrymple's accounts, a senior eunuch, Yaqut, in Qutb Shah's court was asleep, when a man in green robes appeared in a dream and revealed himself as Maula Ali (husband of Fatima, daughter of the Prophet Mohammed). Yaqut followed him up to the summit of a hill, where he fell down before the Maula Ali, who was resting his right hand upon a rock. Before he could say anything Yaqut found himself awake.

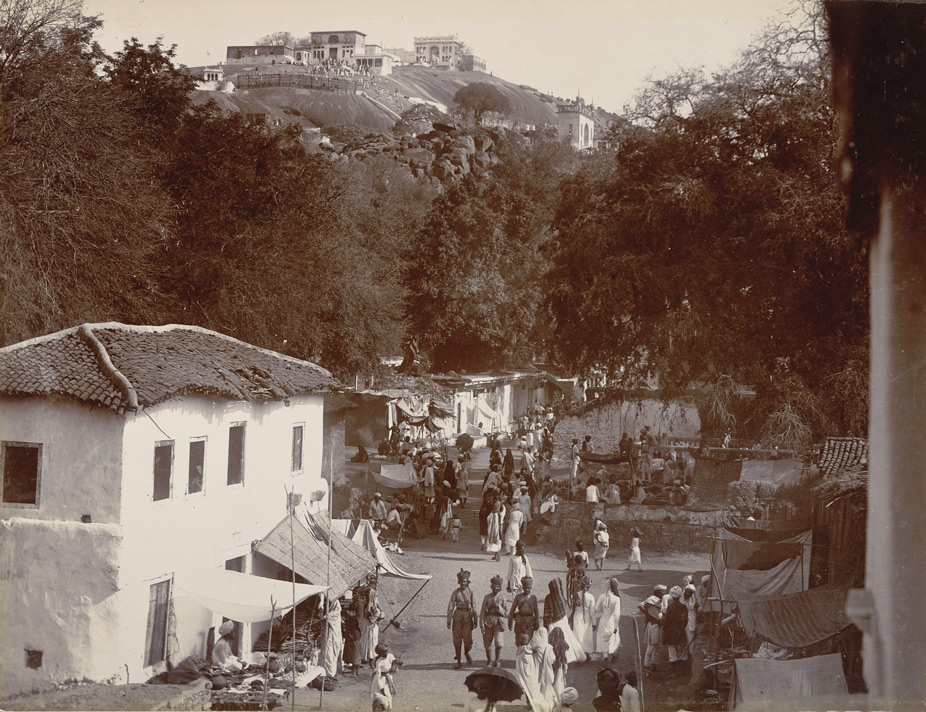
View of bazaar with Maula Ali Hill in the background., circa 1902

Yaqut set off from Golconda in search of the holy hill, and finally found it along with the mark of Maula Ali's handprint branded on the rock. The hand mark was hewn out of the rock and placed in the great arch built at the site.

The highly revered Shi’ite site is not just limited to the devotion of Shia Muslims; the Qutb Shahi tradition of annual celebrations commemorating Yaqut's dream was also continued and patronised by Sunni Asaf-Jahi Nizams. Many great officials and courtiers of Nizam's regime were of the Shi’ite sect. Prime minister and minister of Nizam Ali Khan, Aristu Jah and Mir Alam are few of the notable Shia Muslims. Ma Laqa Bhai Chanda, Tawaif of Nizam Ali khan's court was a notable devotee of the Maula Ali Dargah.

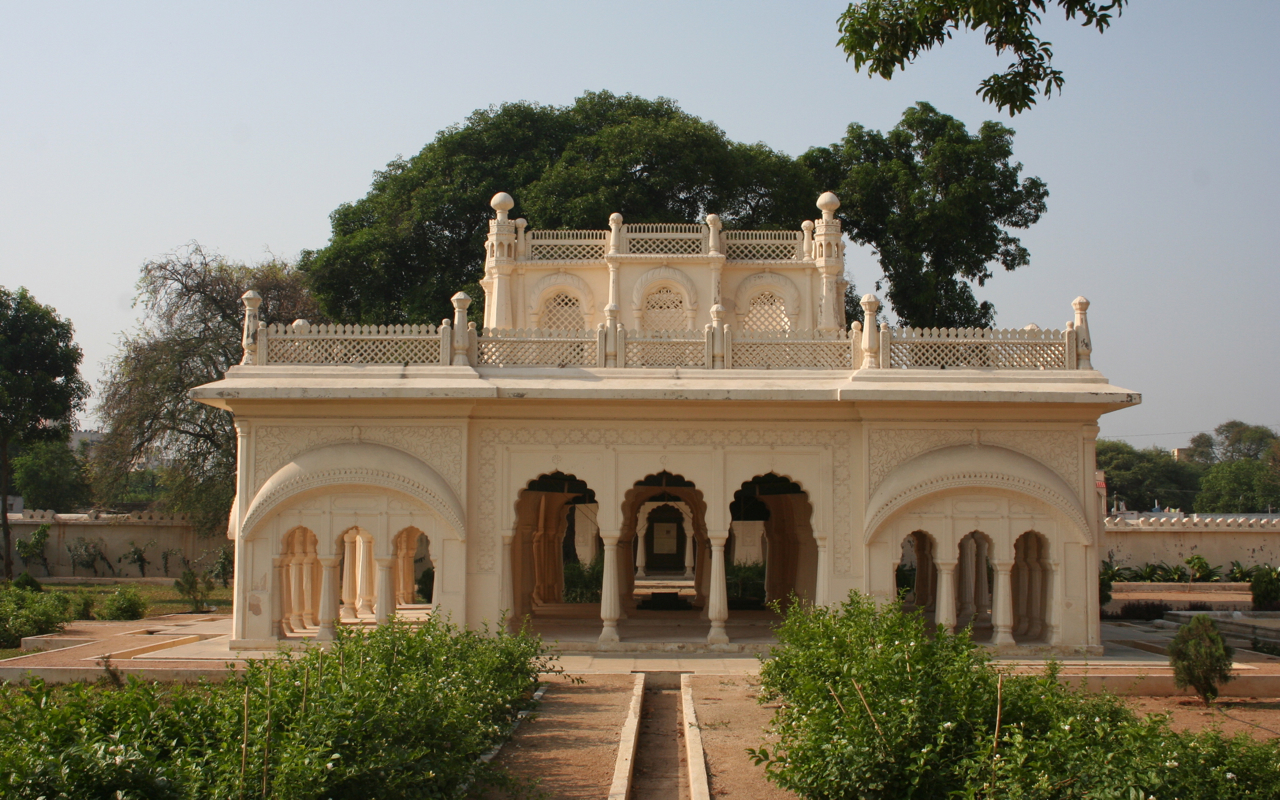
Tomb of Mah Laqa Bai at Moula Ali

Mah Laqa Bai who was born Chanda Bai, and a prominent 18th century Urdu poet, courtesan was based in Moula Ali. She had constructed a walled compound where she frequently held mushairas. Inside this compound, in 1792 she built a tomb for her mother. After her death, Mah Laqa was buried next to her mother.

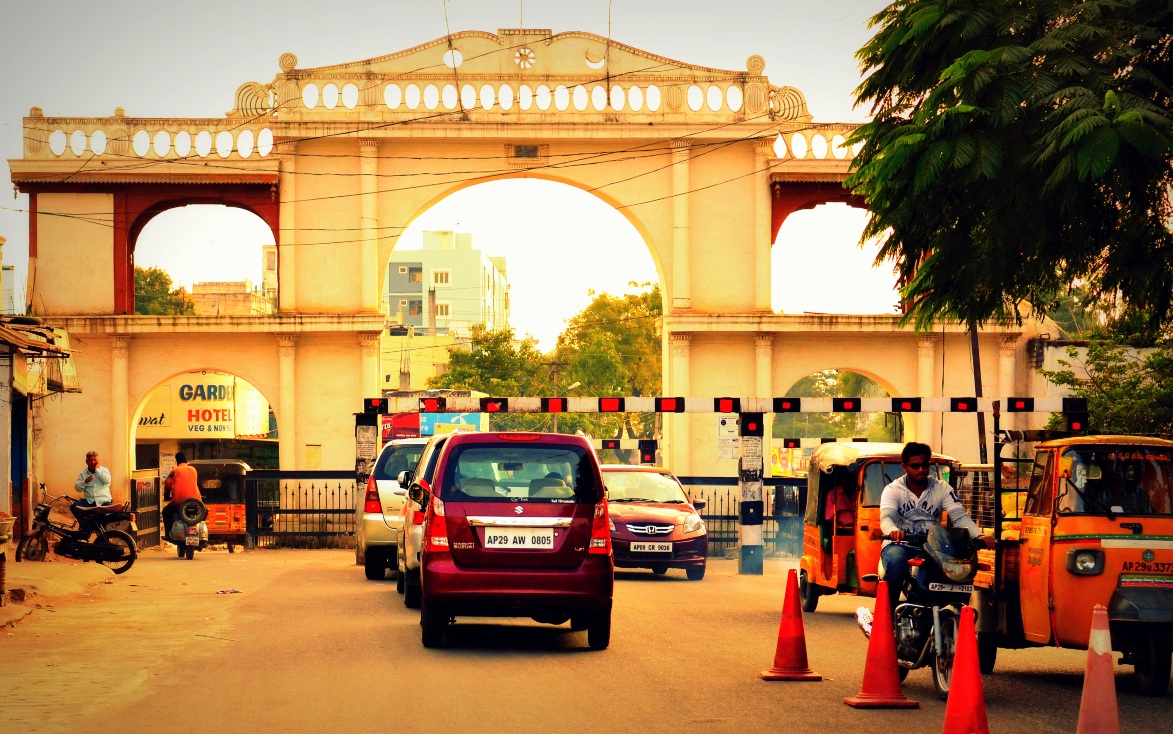
The Moula Ali Kaman

In 1954, the first open prison was opened at Moula Ali. It was later shifted to Cherlaplly.

== Overview ==
The major neighbourhoods are Kamala Nagar, A.S. Rao Nagar, Anand Bagh, DAE Colony etc. Kushaiguda bus depot is also located close to Moula-Ali. A large housing project by Andhra Pradesh Housing Board was established in Moula Ali. This colony is now popularly called APHB colony. APHB Colony is predominantly inhabited by government employees, majorily from companies such as NFC, Republic Forge Company (RFC), ECIL, HMT, and the RPF.

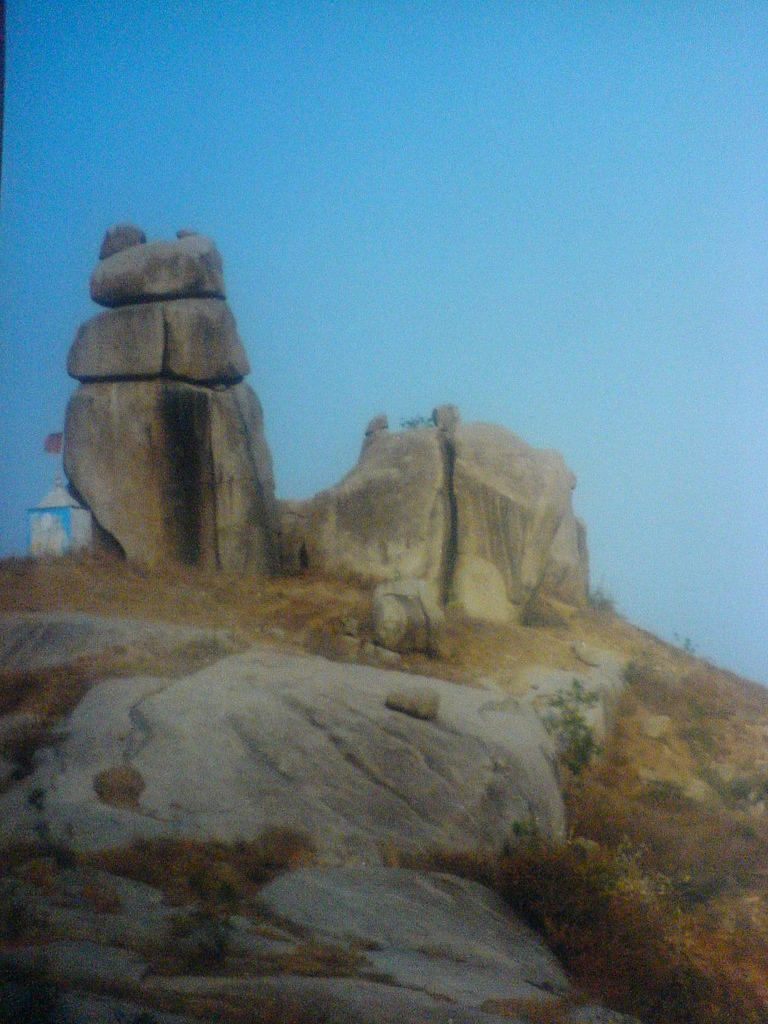
Rock formations near Moula Ali

== Industrial area ==
Various industries are located in and around Moula Ali. The Nuclear Fuel Complex and ECIL are some of the prominent facilities located near Moula Ali. The Republic Forge Company Limited, owned by the state government was also located here, though it was declared bankrupt and shut down. Moula Ali is a major centre for Indian railways, with various facilities like the electric loco-shed located here. Hyderabad Chemicals and Fertilisers was established in Moula-Ali in 1942, but by 1982, the company was declared sick and sold off to a private company. In 1961, Andhra Foundry and Machine Company Limited was established in Moula Ali. Moula-Ali Industrial Estate, with several small and medium scale industries, is located also here.

A division of Union Carbide, manufacturing Eveready batteries is also located at Moula-Ali. HMT Bearings Ltd (formerly Indo-Nippon Precision Bearings Ltd) also has a division in Moula-Ali. A major training centre for Railway Protection Force, Indian Railways Institute for Signal and Telecommunication Engineering and the Zonal Training School (ZTS) of South Central Railway are also located at Moula Ali.

== Transport ==
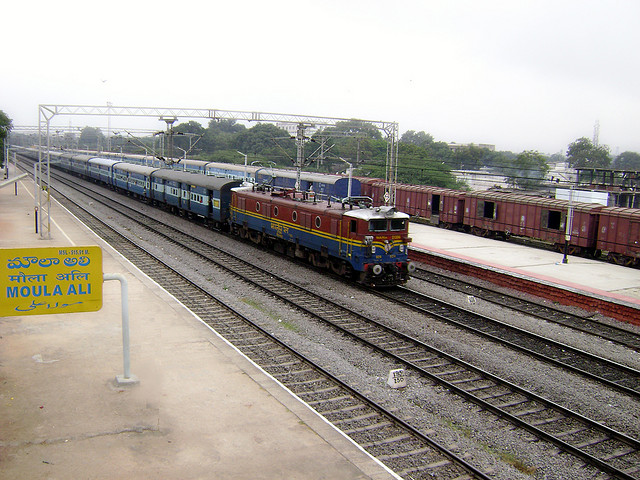
Moula Ali Railway Station

Moula-Ali has well-connected buses operated by Telangana State Road Transport Corporation (TSRTC), which ply on two routes covering most of the area. Kushaiguda Bus Depot is located adjacent to Moula-Ali. There is a railway station around 2 kilometres (1.2 mi) from the center of Moula-Ali; it the first station encountered while travelling from Secunderabad. However, most of the major trains do not have a stop here. The nearest MMTS Train station is at Sitaphalmandi Railway Station. The 250-year-old Moula Ali Kamaan (an arch) was declared unsafe by the Archeology Department and the Roads and Buildings Department decided not to allow traffic through it temporarily but to instead divert it through APHB Colony. Moula Ali Kamaan was restored in 2013 and traffic was permitted to use it again, with the exception of heavy vehicles. Moula-ali is 55 kilometres (34 mi) from Hyderabad International Airport and 5 kilometres (3.1 mi) from Tarnaka Metro station.

== Sub-regions of Moula Ali ==
Moula Ali is divided into 4 regions: Old Moula Ali, ECIL Extension, Upparguda, and Meerpet (also known as IDA Moula Ali).

=== Old Moula Ali ===
- Moula Ali Hill
- Bagh -e- Hydri
- Maruthi Nagar
- Sharmika Nagar
- New Maruthi Nagar
- Chanda Bagh
- MJ Colony
- Saddulla Nagar
- Gandhi Nagar
- Gayathri Nagar
- Andal Nagar
- Hanuman Nagar
- Kasthurba Nagar

=== IDA Moula Ali /Meerpet ===
- Musi Nagar
- Mangapuram
- Kailasa giri
- APHB Colony
- Krishna Nagar
- Indra Nagar
- Meerpet
- New Srinagar Colony

=== ECIL Extension ===
- VNR Enclave
- Venkateswara Nagar
- APIIC Colony
- Rao Nagar Colony
- SP Nagar
- Vasanth Vihar Colony
- Gopal Nagar
- Sai Delux Nagar
- Raghavendra Nagar
- Vasantha Vihar Colony
- Jawahar Nagar
- Satyagiri Colony
- Green Hills Colony
- Adarsh Nagar

=== Upparguda ===
- Upparguda
- Raja Nagar
- Sanjay Gandhi Nagar
- Moula Ali Railway Quarters
- Prashanth Nagar
- Ambedkar Nagar (Esuka Bavi)

=== Talla Basthi ===
- ICRISAT Colony
- Talla Basthi
- CIEFL Colony
- Shiridi Nagar
- Kalyan Nagar
- NMDC Colony
