= National Balloon Facility =

Indian balloon launch base

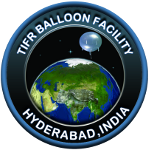
- Established: 1961
- Field of research: Research ballooning
- Chairperson: Prof. Devendra Ojha
- Location: TIFR Balloon Facility, ECIL PO, Hyderabad, Telangana, 500 062, India
- Operating agency: TIFR; ISRO
- Website: tifr.res.in/~bf/index.html

The National Balloon Facility, also known as the TIFR Balloon Facility, is a stratospheric-balloon launch base under the joint management of the Tata Institute of Fundamental Research (TIFR) and the Indian Space Research Organisation (ISRO). This institute is located in Hyderabad near Electronics Corporation of India Limited (ECIL). Being the only major balloon facility in the world close to the geomagnetic equator, this facility is extensively used by researchers from all over the world.

== History ==
Ballooning activity in India was prompted by research into atmospheric exploration and cosmic ray studies. During the 1940s, Dr. Homi J. Bhabha of TIFR started sending balloons up to an altitude of 25 km to study secondary cosmic radiation. Due to unique geographic reasons Hyderabad was selected for stratospheric balloon launches after various diplomatic meetings between US and Indian organisations to jointly launch balloons from Hyderabad. The first launch had support of Air Force Cambridge Research Laboratory (AFCRL) and TIFR.

The launches were carried out from two locations. US balloons were launched from Begumpet Airport and Indian balloons from Osmania University Campus. The first balloon was launched on 2 February 1961. During the first stage of the facility's operation, forty balloons were launched.

After five years all the facilities were consolidated at Osmania University and under management of National Center for Atmospheric Research & TIFR and around 170 balloons were launched.

After a few years with increasing demands for balloon flights, a relatively low population density and proximity to the geomagnetic equator, a permanent site at Hyderabad near ECIL was selected. However, due to rapid development this facility is today surrounded by several population settlements: by the Cherlapally Central Jail in the east; Kamala Nagar in the west; and Electronics Corporation of India Ltd. in the south.

== Activities ==
The campus contains a complete balloon manufacturing facility. The institute conducts balloon-based scientific experiments in X-ray and Infrared Astronomy, and in Aeronomy. Balloons from this facility are launched twice in a year, i.e. in summer and winter. NBF also regularly monitors and analyses local weather at tropospheric and stratospheric altitudes, required for making decisions about balloon launches.

Under the High Altitude Balloon Development Project, a 61,000m³ indigenously developed balloon penetrated into the Mesosphere on 7 January 2014, for the first time in India. Until that time, only balloons from USA and Japan had accomplished this feat.

Recently, TIFR has embarked on a long-distance quantum communication activity using Stratospheric Balloons.

== See also ==
- High-altitude balloon
