= Andhra Pradesh Housing Board =

- Type: Public sector
- Industry: Housing
- Founded: 1 July 1960 Hyderabad, Andhra Pradesh
- Headquarters: Amaravati, Andhra Pradesh, India
- Area served: Andhra Pradesh
- Parent: Ministry of Housing, Government of Andhra Pradesh
- Website: www.aphb.gov.in

The Andhra Pradesh Housing Board is public sector corporation under Government of Andhra Pradesh located in Vijayawada, Andhra Pradesh. Its activities are to facilitate affordable housing to the citizens of Andhra Pradesh. The board, which was formerly known as City Improvement Board until 1960 in United Andhra Pradesh, was conceived by Nizam Osman Ali Khan, Asaf Jah VII in 1911.

== History ==
=== Early roots (1911–1959) ===
In the early 20th century, Nizams-ruled Hyderabad was affected by the large-scale flooding of the Musi river in 1908 and a deadly plague in 1911. This led to a decrease in population in the city. Then-Nizam Osman Ali Khan, Asaf Jah VII, who had just occupied the throne, was aware of these problems. Together with his ministers and city planners, the Nizam decided to improve the sanitation and hygiene of the city. The City Improvement Board was formed in 1912 with the Nizam's son Moazzam Jah as its President. The mandate of this entity was to bring about planned development of the city with its specific tasks being improvement of slums, housing for poor, acquiring open lands, underground drainage, road widening schemes and laying of roads to enable the use of buses. Sir Visvesvarayya was also requested to contribute with his ideas for the further improvement of the city. The board commenced operations at a building in Basheerbagh, which was built with a Regional Mughal Variation-styled architecture, and continued here for over four decades.

The board took up activities such as rehabilitation of slums in Dabeerpura, Sultan Shahi, Mughalpura, Nampally and Gunfoundry, Red Hills, Mallepally and those that were lined along the banks of Musi River. The board is also credited with the construction of the Nizamia Tibbi Hospital (near Charminar), Pathergatti complex, Moazzam Jahi Market, Andhra Pradesh High Court, Osmania Hospital and the City College. The architecture of domes and arches that was used for these projects became known as the CIB or the Osmanian style. Besides this, the board enhanced the look of Hyderabad by constructing elaborate gardens, planned housing colonies, potable drinking water supply, underground drainage with separate stormwater drains, wide roads and bus and train services, much before many of the major cities of India.

=== Post-independence era (1960–present) ===
The City Improvement Board and another entity called the Town Improvement Trust were merged to form the Andhra Pradesh Housing Board on 1 July 1960.

In 2002, the Government of Andhra Pradesh recognized the growth potential of the real estate industry when it realized that there was a supply and demand mismatch of affordable housing. With an estimated demand of 1.5 million houses, the government decided to construct 0.6 million houses mainly for the middle class segment. Bearing this in mind, the board signed up with Malaysia-based IJM Corporation to develop 25 acres (10 ha) of land in Kukatpally with a public-private partnership model at a cost of US$150 million.

In the same year, the board teamed up with a subsidiary of Housing and Development Board, Government of Singapore to develop quality housing and provide infrastructure for people on a 'design and build' model. As a part of this initiative, 1,600 apartments were to be constructed in the form of a self-sufficient integrated township on the Hyderabad–Warangal highway – 18 kilometres (11 mi) from Hyderabad called as Singapore Township near Ghatkesar. Similar initiatives were taken up near the International Institute of Information Technology, Indian School of Business and the Games Village near Gachibowli in order to meet the demands of the population working in HITEC City, a major technology township in Hyderabad. In addition, the board initiated projects in Guntur, Bhimavaram, Vijayawada, Mahbubnagar, Kurnool, Machilipatnam and Rajahmundry. After the bifurcation of Andhra Pradesh, the Andhra Pradesh Housing Board was relocated to Amaravati and Telangana Housing Board was set up for the state of Telangana in Hyderabad.
