= Mahboob Ali Khan =

Nizam of Hyderabad from 1869 to 1911

Mahbub Ali Khan
- Sipah Salar, Fath Jang, Nizam of Hyderabad, GCB, GCSI
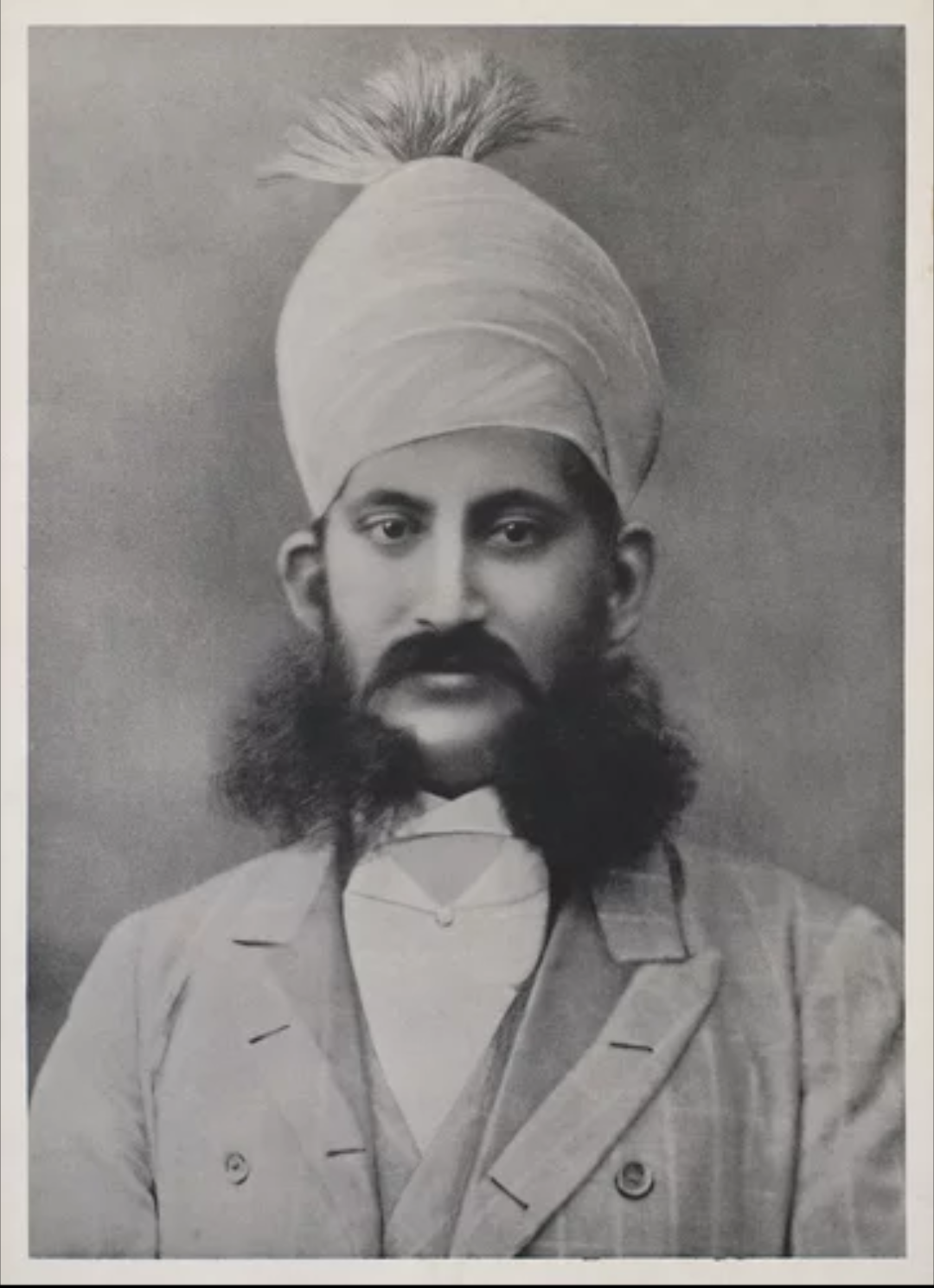
- Khan in 1903

9th Nizam of Hyderabad State
- Reign: 26 February 1869 – 29 August 1911
- Predecessor: Afzal ad-Dawlah, Asaf Jah V
- Successor: Mir Osman Ali Khan, Asaf Jah VII
- Born: 17 August 1866; Purani Haveli, Hyderabad British India (now in Telangana State, India)
- Died: 29 August 1911 (aged 45); Falaknuma Palace, Hyderabad, British India (now in Telangana State, India)
- Burial: Makkah Masjid, Hyderabad (now in Telangana State, India)
- Spouse: Amat-uz-Zahra Begum; Ujala Begum; Rahat Begum; Sardar Begum; Umda Begum
- Issue: Mir Osman Ali Khan; Salabat Jah; Mir Murad Ali Khan; Basalat Jah; Qadir Ali Khan; Nizam-un-Nisa Begum; Ghous-un-Nisa Begum; Daud-un-Nisa Begum
- House: Asaf Jahi dynasty
- Father: Afzal ad-Dawlah, Asaf Jah V
- Religion: Sunni Islam

Asaf Jah VI, also known as Sir Mir Mahboob Ali Khan Siddiqi GCB GCSI (17 August 1866 – 29 August 1911), was the sixth Nizam of Hyderabad. He ruled Hyderabad State, one of the princely states of India, between 1869 and 1911.

== Early life ==
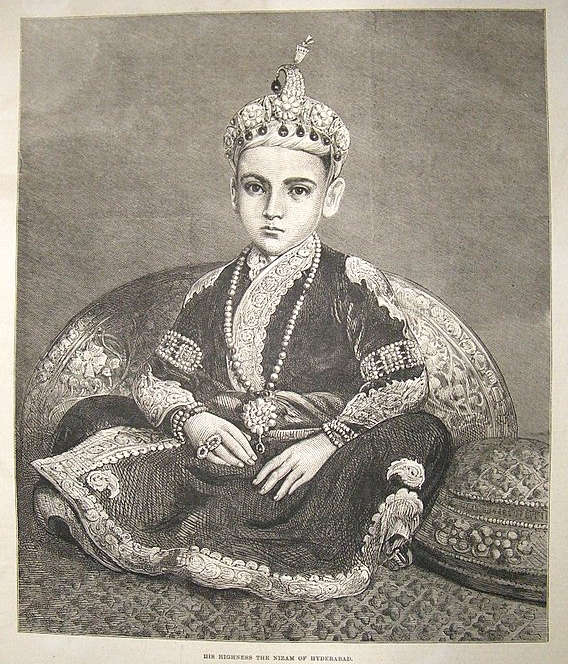
Mahboob Ali Khan as a child

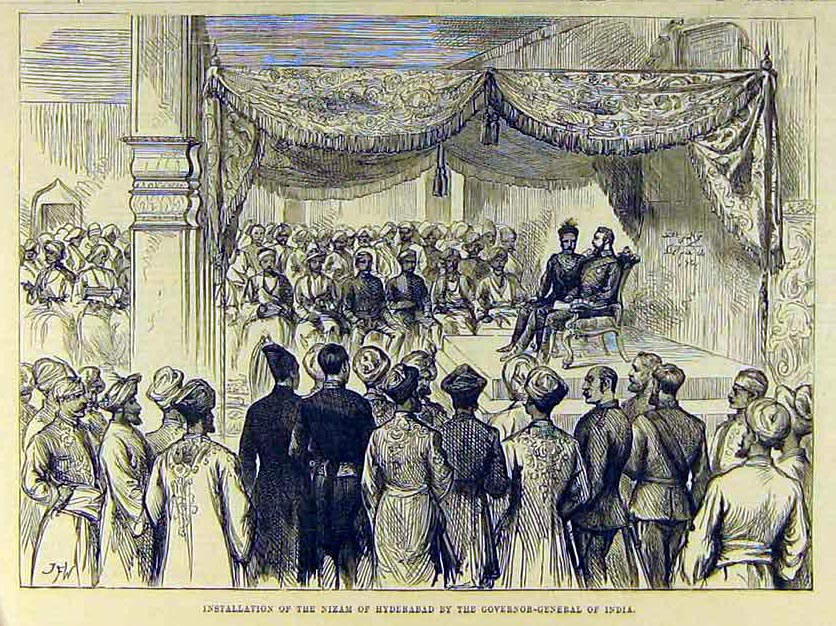
Installation of the Nizam of Hyderabad by the Governor-General of India

Mahboob Ali Khan was born on 17 August 1866 at Purani Haveli in Hyderabad, Hyderabad State (now in Telangana, India). He was the youngest son of the 5th Nizam, Afzal-ud-Daulah. Afzal-ud-Daulah died on 29 February, and a day later Mahboob Ali Khan ascended the throne, at the age of two years and seven months, under the regency of Dewan Salar Jung I with Shams-ul-Umra III as co-regent.

Mahboob Ali Khan was the first Nizam to have a Western education. A special school, under the guidance of Captain John Clarke, a former tutor to the Duke of Edinburgh, was started in the Chowmahalla Palace. The children of Salar Jung I, Shams-ul-Umra III and Kishen Pershad were his classmates. Besides English, he was also taught Persian, Arabic and Urdu. In 1874, Captain John Clarke was appointed to teach him English. Clarke imbibed in the "young Mahboob the customs and manners of high English society". Clarke worked closely with an Indian tutor, Navab Agha Mirza Sarvar al-Mulk, who shared in supervising the Nizam's education and ultimately became a close confidant and advisor to him.

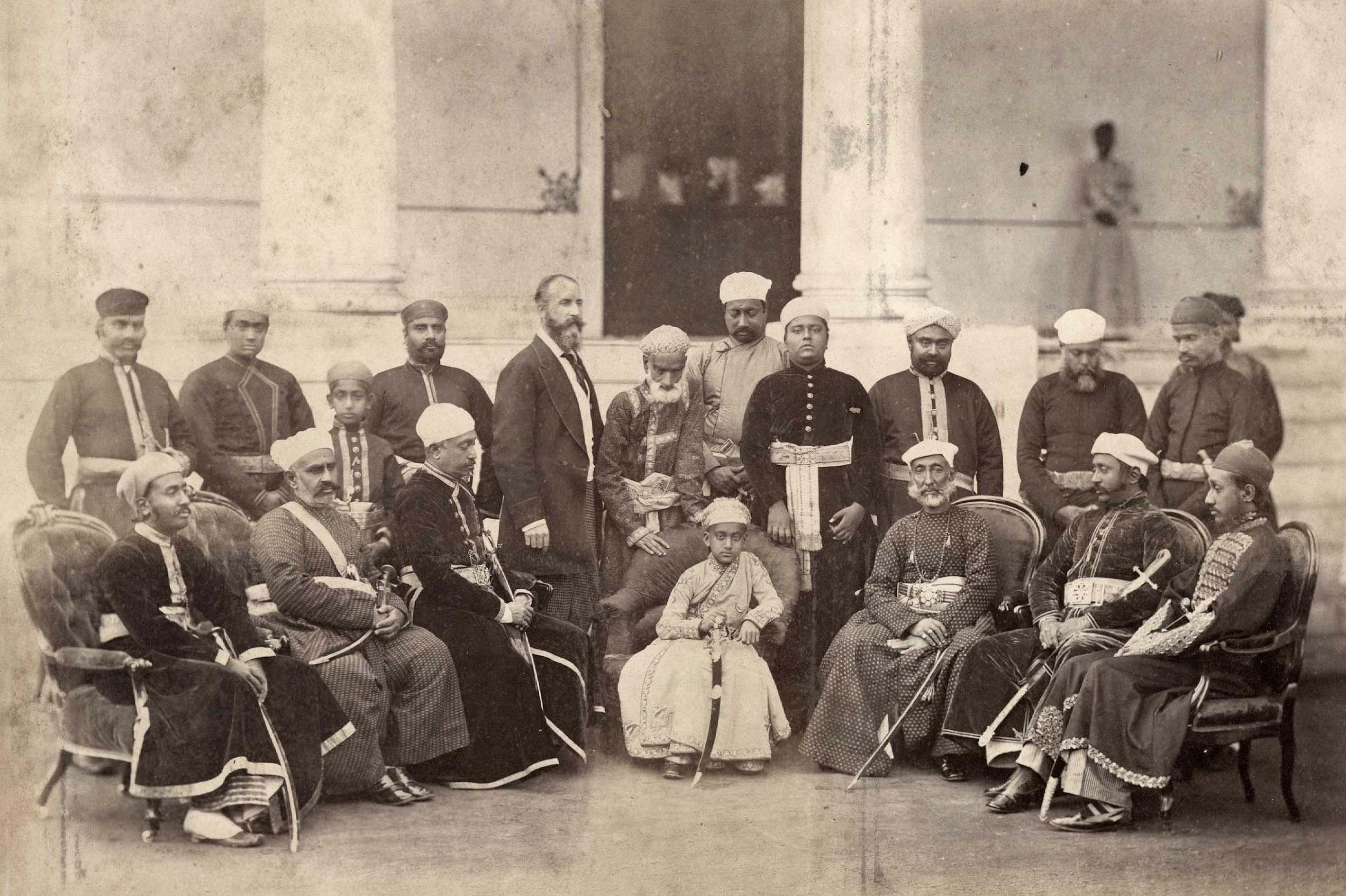
The young Nizam with his two regents and other noblemen

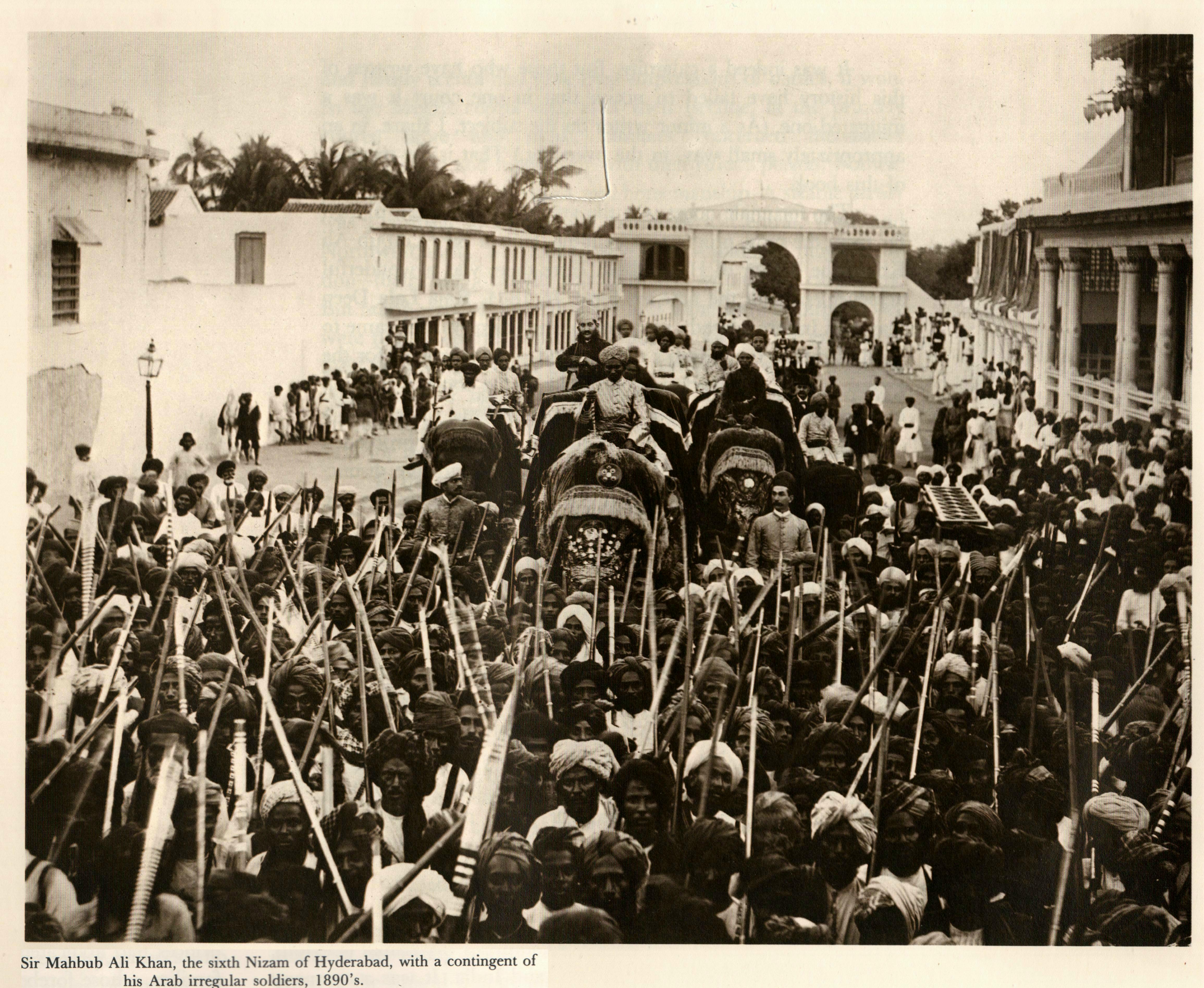
The Nizam riding an elephant in a procession from Moula Ali, circa. 1895

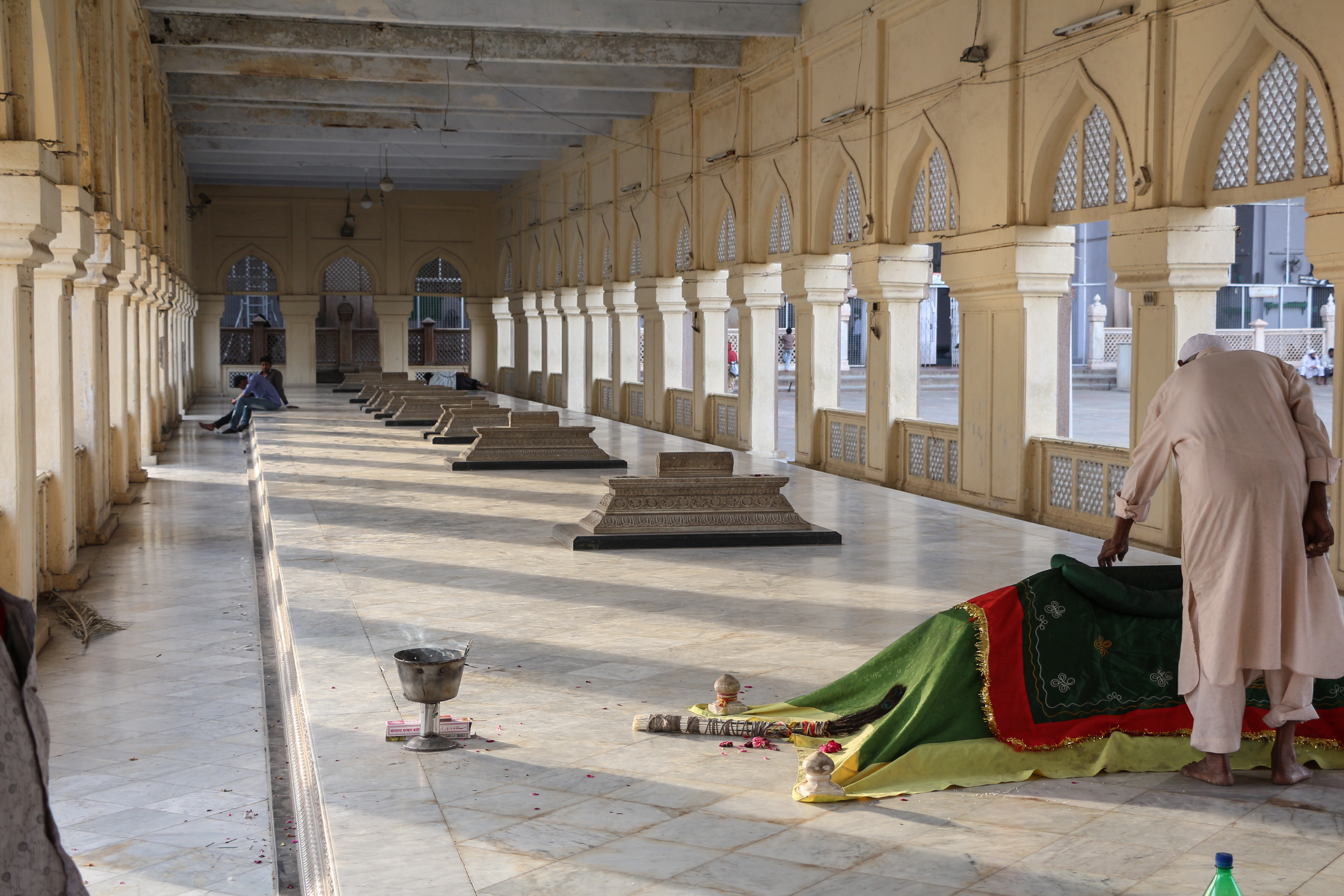
Grave of 6th Nizam- Mir Mahboob Ali Khan adjacent to prayer hall of Makkah Masjid, Hyderabad

== Reign ==
=== Investiture ===
At the age of sixteen, Salar Jung I began introducing Mahboob Ali Khan to the administrative processes of the state. The highest-ranking officials of various departments would meet him to teach how their respective departments worked. The regency of Salar Jung I and Shams-ul-Umra III ended when Mahboob Ali Khan came of age. His investiture ceremony took place on 5 February 1884. Lord Ripon, the Governor-General of India, was present and gave him a golden sword, which was studded with diamonds. Mahboob Ali Khan took the title His Exalted Highness Asaf Jah, Muzaffar-ul-Mulk, Nawab Mahbub Ali Khan Bahadur, Fateh Jung.

=== Development of railway network ===
Nizam's Guaranteed State Railway, a railway company fully owned by the Nizams, was established in 1879. Formed to connect Hyderabad State with the rest of British India, it had its headquartered at Secunderabad Railway Station. Its construction commenced in 1870, and four years later, the Secunderabad-Wadi line was completed. In 1879, Mahboob Ali Khan took over the railway line, which was managed by the Nizam's state-owned railway.

After independence, it was integrated into Indian Railways. The introduction of railways also marked the beginning of the industry in Hyderabad, and four factories were built to the south and east of Hussain Sagar Lake.

=== Education development ===
Mahboob Ali Khan established the Hyderabad Medical College, the first in India, and commissioned for chloroform the first time in world. In 1873, there were 14 schools in Hyderabad City and 141 in the rest of the districts. The number of schools reached 1000 at the time of his death.

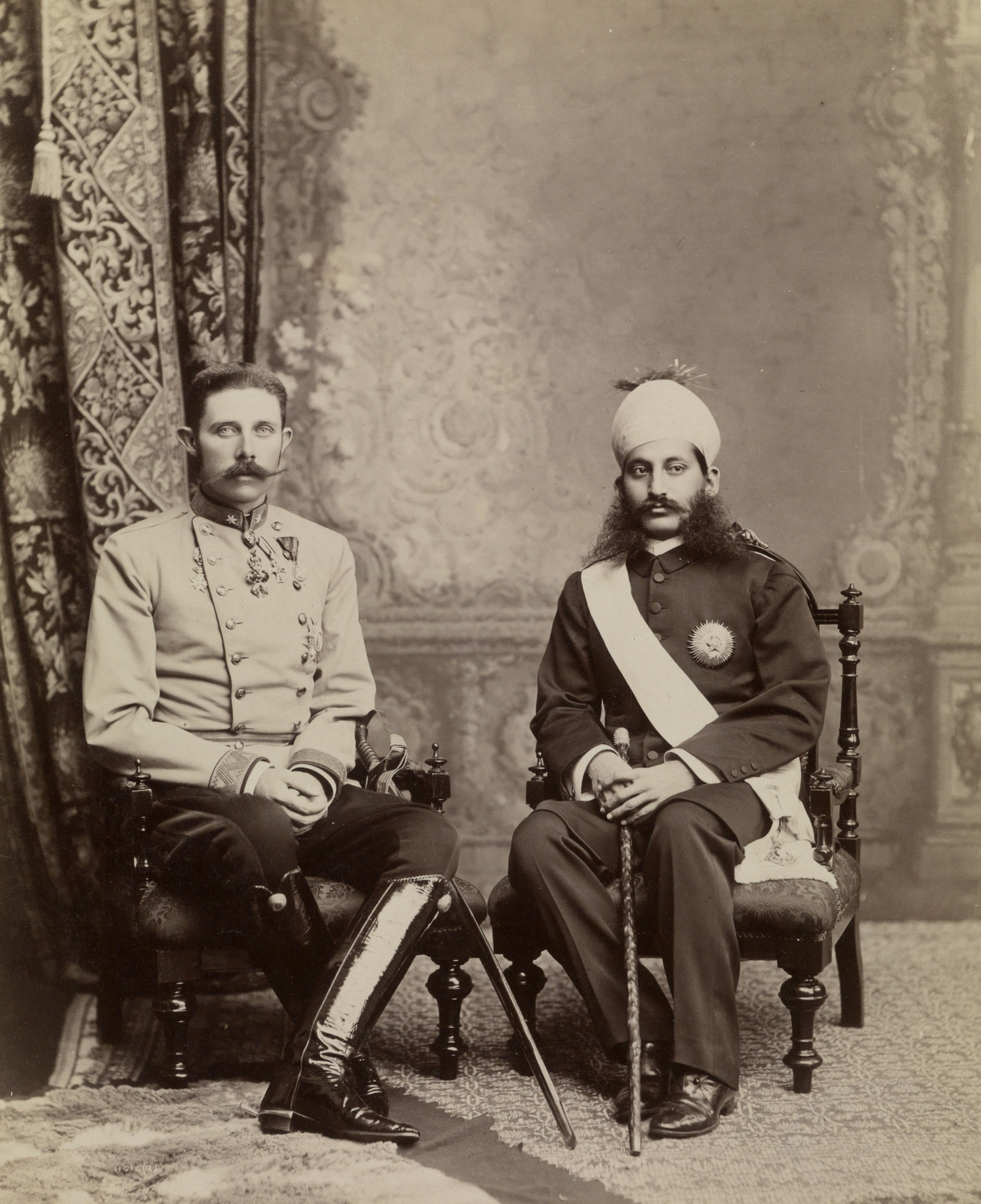
Archduke Franz Ferdinand with Mahboob Ali Khan, Asaf Jah VI during his January 1893 visit to Hyderabad.

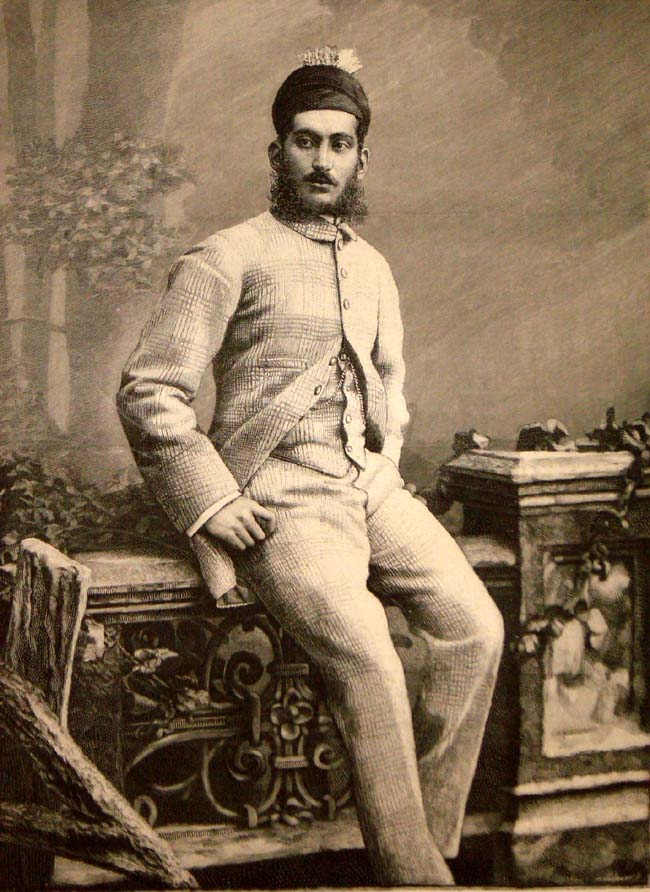
Picture of Mahboob Ali Khan, Asaf Jah VI as published in the Illustrated London News in 1889

=== Events during rule ===
==== Famine ====
The Great Famine of 1876–1878 occurred during his reign. The entire Deccan, including Hyderabad Deccan, was devastated by food shortages, which were enormously exacerbated by British policies. When the Nizam distributed aid to famine victims in Hyderabad, tens of thousands of people fled Sholapur and other affected areas.

==== Durbar ====
The Nizam was a senior ruling prince present at the 1903 Delhi Durbar celebrations that marked the succession of Edward VII as Emperor of India. During the event the Nizam was invested with the Grand Cross of the Order of the Bath (GCB) personally by the Duke of Connaught, who represented his brother at the ceremonies.

==== Flood of 1908 ====
The Great Musi Flood of 1908 ravaged the city of Hyderabad, affected at least 200,000 people and killed an estimated 15,000. The Nizam opened his palace to accommodate the flood victims until "normal conditions were restored". HEH Nizam 7th Mir Mehboob Ali Khan Siddiqui followed the guidance of Hazrath Syed Shah Inyatullah Shah Quadri (Sufi Saint belongs to Quadri Silsila). He observed Chilla Khashi, 41 days of meditation, on the banks of River Musi to overcome the floods. The 7th Nizam was a Sufi King who was spiritually empowered and would communicate with the spiritual aura. His family members claimed his 6th sense was very active. He would foresee the future during his dreaming. He attended Mehfil Sama (sufi Qawwali) at the Darbar of Hazrath Shah Khamoosh Shah, Nampally Hyderabad-British India.

=== Prohibition of Sati ===
The practice of Sati was the Hindu tradition of a widowed woman jumping into her husband's burning pyre. That concerned the Nizam, who took serious note of it continuing in some parts of his kingdom despite its banning, and so he issued a royal firman on 12 November 1876:

It is now notified that if anybody takes any action in this direction in the future, they will have to face serious consequences. If Taluqdars, Naibs, Jagirdars, Zamindars and others are found careless and negligent in the matter, serious action will be taken against them by the government.

== Personal life ==
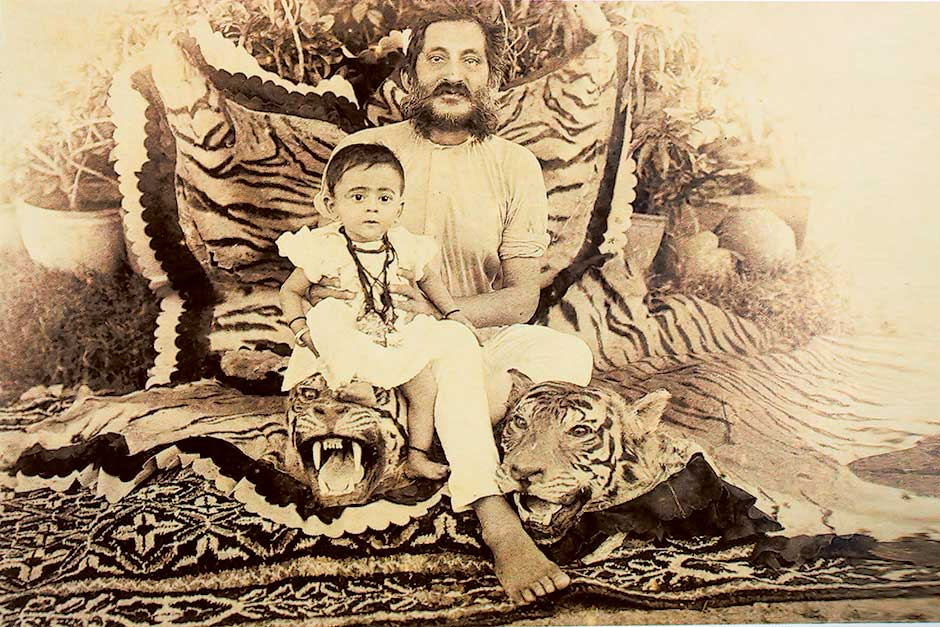
Nizam Mahboob Ali Khan with his daughter

According to the Viceroy of India, Lord Lytton, the Nizam was the object of the Diwan, Salar Jung I, a man who wanted to reduce Mir Mahboob Ali Khan to a cipher to hold the power of the state and keep it concentrated in his own hands.

=== Family ===
He was married to Amat-uz-Zahra Begum, daughter of Salar Jung I with whom he fell in love while he was studying at the age of 18. She was the mother of Mir Osman Ali Khan. Another wife was Ujala Begum. She was the mother of Salabat Jah and Mir Murad Ali Khan. Another wife was Rahat Begum. She was the mother of Basalat Jah. Some other wives were Sardar Begum and Umda Begum. Another son was Qadir Ali Khan, who died in 1894, and was buried in Makkah Masjid, Hyderabad. Mir Osman Ali Khan became his successor and his daughters were married into the House of Paigah. One of his daughters was Nizam-un-Nisa Begum. She is buried in Makkah Masjid, Hyderabad. Another daughter was Ghous-un-Nisa Begum, who married Nawab Muhammad Farid ud-din Khan Bahadur, Farid Nawaz Jang. Another daughter was Daud un-nisa Begum, who married Nawab Muhammad Nazir ud-din Khan Bahadur, Nazir Nawaz Jang.

=== Lifestyle ===
The Nizam was well known for his extravagant lifestyle and collection of clothes and cars. His collection of clothes was one of the most extensive in the world at the time. He devoted a whole wing of his palace to his wardrobe and would never wear the same outfit twice. He bought the Jacob Diamond, which stands out among the Jewels of The Nizams that are now owned by the Government of India.

The Nizam was also fluent in Urdu, Telugu and Persian. He also wrote poems in Telugu and Urdu, some of which are inscribed along the walls of Tank Bund. A keen hunter, he killed at least 30 tigers.

=== Death ===
The Nizam died, rumored cause of death to be alcohol poisoning caused by pressure from wives to declare the heir to the throne, on 29 August 1911 at the age of 45. He was buried alongside his ancestors at Makkah Masjid, Hyderabad. His second son, Mir Osman Ali Khan, succeeded him.

== Mystical powers ==
He claimed to possess a healing power for snakebites. It was his order that anyone with a snakebite could approach him for help. He was reportedly repeatedly awakened from his sleep. According to the book "Tulasī kī sāhitya-sādhanā: The Legacy of the Nizams", Muneeruddin Khan, titled Secunder Yar Jung, taught him the spell.

Telangana Today writes, "When Mahboob Ali acquired the magical power from Muneeruddin Khan, he issued a command order (Farman) on the 16th day of Ramzan, 1321 Hijri (1905 AD) informing all about this acquired power that those who are bitten by a poisonous snake have simply to say "Mahboob Pasha ki duhaai, zahar utar ja" (In the name of Mahboob Pasha, I order the poison to become ineffective)."

The "opening" of His 3rd eye, he claimed enabled him to mentally see through physical objects such as the water level or what was behind a wall. He would determine who was to visit him before their arrival.

He would spend time with the great Sufi Saint Hazrat Shah Khamoosh Shah . to cure people of snakebites.

== Other names ==
He was better known by the people as "Mahboob Ali Pasha", "Mahboob" meaning "dear one".

He was known as a skilled hunter. People from nearby villages would call on him to hunt dangerous tigers that threatened farmers or were lurking in the nearby fields. His trophy count was at least 33 tigers. He was popularly known as Tees Maar Khan, meaning the Khan who killed tees (thirty) tigers.

Despite his reputation as a tiger-hunter, Khan was known for his compassion and love for all living things. He would never kill a tiger unless it was a matter of necessity, and he always treated the animals he hunted with respect. He understood that the tiger could be a threat and a magnificent creature, which deserved to live unless it posed a threat to humans.

=== Full titles ===
- 1866–1869: Sahibzada Mir Mahbub Ali Khan Siddiqi Bahadur
- 1869–1877: His Highness Rustam-i-Dauran, Arustu-i-Zaman, Wal Mamaluk, Asaf Jah VI, Muzaffar ul-Mamaluk, Nizam ul-Mulk, Nizam ud-Daula, Nawab Mir Mahbub 'Ali Khan Bahadur, Sipah Salar, Fath Jang, Nizam of Hyderabad
- 1877–1884: His Highness Rustam-i-Dauran, Arustu-i-Zaman, Wal Mamaluk, Asaf Jah VI, Muzaffar ul-Mamaluk, Nizam ul-Mulk, Nizam ud-Daula, Nawab Mir Mahbub 'Ali Khan Siddiqi Bahadur, Sipah Salar, Fath Jang, Nizam of Hyderabad
- 1884–1902: His Highness Rustam-i-Dauran, Arustu-i-Zaman, Wal Mamaluk, Asaf Jah VI, Muzaffar ul-Mamaluk, Nizam ul-Mulk, Nizam ud-Daula, Nawab Sir Mir Mahbub 'Ali Khan Bahadur, Sipah Salar, Fath Jang, Nizam of Hyderabad, GCSI
- 1903–1910: His Highness Rustam-i-Dauran, Arustu-i-Zaman, Wal Mamaluk, Asaf Jah VI, Muzaffar ul-Mamaluk, Nizam ul-Mulk, Nizam ud-Daula, Nawab Sir Mir Mahboob 'Ali Khan Bahadur, Sipah Salar, Fath Jang, Nizam of Hyderabad, GCB, GCSI
- 1910–1911: Lieutenant-General His Highness Rustam-i-Dauran, Arustu-i-Zaman, Wal Mamaluk, Asaf Jah VI, Muzaffar ul-Mamaluk, Nizam ul-Mulk, Nizam ud-Daula, Nawab Mir Sir Mahbub 'Ali Khan Siddiqi Bahadur, Sipah Salar, Fath Jang, Nizam of Hyderabad, GCB, GCSI

== Honours ==
(ribbon bar, as it would look today)

British honours

- Empress of India Gold Medal, 1877
- Knight Grand Commander of the Order of the Star of India (GCSI), 1884
- Honorary Knight Grand Cross of the Order of the Bath (GCB), in the 1903 Durbar Honours list, 1903
- Delhi Durbar Gold Medal, 1903

Foreign honours

- (Kingdom of Prussia) Grand Cross of the Order of the Red Eagle, 1911

== See also ==
- Hyderabad State
- Nizam
- Establishments during Nizams Rule
- Jewels of the Nizams
- Nizam College

Mahboob Ali Khan Asaf Jahi dynasty
Preceded by Afzal ad-Dawlah, Asaf Jah V	Nizam of Hyderabad; 1869–1911	Succeeded by Osman Ali Khan, Asaf Jah VII
