= Salabat Jah =

Member of House of Asaf Jah

Mir Ahmad Mohiuddin Ali Khan
- Nawab; Salabat Jah; Salabat Jung
- Born: c. 1907; Purani Haveli
- Died: 2 March 1934; Begumpet
- Burial: Makkah Masjid
Names
- Mir Ahmad Mohiuddin Ali Khan; Urdu: میر احمد محی الدین علی خان
- House: Hyderabad
- Dynasty: Asaf Jahi
- Father: Mahboob Ali Khan
- Mother: Ujala Begum

Mir Ahmad Mohiuddin Ali Khan (or Salabat Jah; 1907 – 2 March 1934) was a son of Mahboob Ali Khan, the Nizam of Hyderabad, and a member of the Asaf Jahi dynasty.

== Life ==
Jah was born as Mir Ahmad Mohiuddin Ali Khan in 1907 to Mahboob Ali Khan and his wife Ujala Begum. To celebrate his birth, a 21-gun salute was fired, the nobles and officials of Hyderabad presented his father with nazranas or gifts, and a state-wide holiday of two days was announced. His father had endowed a trust for his maintenance and upkeep, and this trust contained an estate of 16.859 acres in Malabar Hill, Mumbai. The trust was to be managed by a council until he came of age. When his father died in 1911, his mother and some officials and nobles of the state advanced the Jah claim to succeed him to his title, rank and dignity, but they all failed, as his older step-brother Osman Ali Khan was already installed as the Nizam of Hyderabad. He was four years old at the time, and Osman preferred to keep him and his mother under his close supervision, and the two were shifted on 2 September 1911 to Eden Bagh. His tasmia qwani was performed at Bagh-e-Aam on 12 April 1911. He was first educated by Hugh Gough and then by Marmaduke Pickthall. After that, he was taught by Agha Haider Hasan Mirza. In 1918, Osman granted him the titles of Nawab, Salabat Jah, and Salabat Jung, and conferred on him the insignia of the chaur, morchal, and nagara. In 1930–1931, he visited England, accompanied by Mr Hadi. When Marquess of Willingdon, as Viceroy and Governor-General of India, visited Hyderabad with his wife, Marie, in 1933, he was part of his brother Osman's staff and was presented to the Marquess, firstly at the railway station, then at Falaknuma Palace, and then at Chowmahalla Palace.

Jah's Mumbai estate was confiscated by his brother Osman. Following which, Jah complained to the then resident at Hyderabad, and the resident asked Osman to return the estate to Jah, but Osman asked that the estate should be valued and Jah should be paid the value as compensation instead of the estate. To this proposal, Jah and the resident agreed, and Cowasji Jehangir was appointed by the resident to value the estate. Cowasji valued the estate at Rs. 1700000, and Osman paid that amount to Jah.

== Death ==
Jah died on 2 March 1934 at his residence at Begumpet. Some say that he died from poisoning, but other claims state that he had kidney trouble and was very ill during his last three days. His funeral took place at Makkah Masjid and was attended by his brother Osman Ali Khan, his nephews Azam Jah and Moazzam Jah, and by all officials and nobles of Hyderabad State. He was buried next to his father. Government offices and educational institutions in Hyderabad were closed in his memory.

== Titles ==
- 1907 – 1918: Sahibzada Mir Ahmad Mohiuddin Ali Khan Bahadur of Hyderabad
- 1918 – 2 March 1934: Nawab Salabat Jah Sahibzada Mir Ahmad Mohiuddin Ali Khan Bahadur Salabat Jung of Hyderabad
