= Kamala Nagar, Hyderabad =

Kamala Nagar
- Location in Telangana Kamala Nagar (India)
- Coordinates: 17°28′23″N 78°33′59″E
- Country: India
- State: Telangana
- District: Medchal–Malkajgiri district

Government
  - Body: Kapra Municipal Corporation

Languages
  - Official: Telugu
- Time zone: UTC+5:30 (IST)
- PIN: 500 062
- Vehicle registration: TS
- Lok Sabha constituency: Secunderabad
- Vidhan Sabha constituency: Kapra
- Planning agency: Kapra Municipal Corporation
- Website: telangana.gov.in

Kamala Nagar is a suburb in Hyderabad. It is located close to ECIL and NFC.

== Transport ==
The closest railway station is Secunderabad. For city trains and MMTS, the Moula-Ali Railway Station and the Ramakrishnapuram Railway Station are the nearest.

Buses from Kamala Nagar for travel within Hyderabad and out of Hyderabad are operated by the state government owned TSRTC. Kushaiguda bus depot of TSRTC is located adjacent to this suburb.

There are many cab and other Tour Private Operators having many trips to parts of Coastal Andhra, Maharashtra, Karnataka and Kerala.

== History ==
This settlement grew when people working in ECIL and NFC settled here, turning into a large suburb.

== Landmarks ==
Kushaiguda industrial area, Anupuram, A.S.Rao Nagar, DAE Colony, HCL Colony, Ghatkesar and Moula-Ali are the major areas close to Kamala Nagar. Ayyapa Temple run by Malayalis settled in and around Kamala Nagar is located here. ECIL X Roads is another prominent landmark at Kamala Nagar. ECIL Bus Station, a major bus station and police station are located here.
