= Moula Ali railway station =

Railway station in Telangana, India

Moula Ali
- Station board of Moula Ali railway station.

General information
- Location: Moula Ali, Malkajgiri Mandal, Hyderabad, Telangana; India
- Coordinates: 17.4413583°N 78.5512429°E
- Elevation: 520 metres (1,710 ft)
- System: Indian Railways and Hyderabad MMTS station
- Owner: Indian Railways
- Operator: South Central Railway
- Platforms: 3
- Tracks: 6

Construction
- Structure type: Standard on ground
- Parking: Available

Other information
- Status: Functioning
- Station code: MLY
- Zone(s): South Central Railway zone
- Division(s): Secunderabad

History
- Opened: 1920; 106 years ago

Passengers
- 2,500 Daily
Location

The Moula Ali railway station (station code:- MLY) is located in Moula Ali, with a part of the station in Malkajgiri mandal, Hyderabad. It contains four cabins: Moula Ali A Cabin, Moula Ali B Cabin, Moula Ali Goods Cabin and Moula Ali Bypass (C)Cabin.

South Central Railway has developed Moula Ali railway station into an 'Adarsh Station'. The façade of the station has been renovated. Special parking facilities are available for persons with disabilities and senior citizens.

== Diesel Loco Shed, Moula Ali ==
Sr No.	Locomotive Class	Horsepower	Quantity
1.	WAG-9	6120	70'
2.	WDG-3A	3100	7
3.	WDM-3D	3300	9
4.	WDP-4/WDP-4D	4500	12
Total Locomotives Active as of January 2026			98
