= Telangana Housing Board =

Public housing agency in Telangana, India

- Type: Public sector
- Industry: Housing
- Founded: 2 June 2014
- Headquarters: Hyderabad, Telangana, India
- Area served: Telangana
- Key people: B.M.D. Ekka, Vice Chairman
- Parent: Ministry of Housing, Government of Telangana
- Website: hb.telangana.gov.in

The Telangana Housing Board (THB) is a public sector corporation under the Government of Telangana located in Hyderabad, Telangana. Its activities are to facilitate affordable housing to the citizens of Telangana. The board, which was formerly known as City Improvement Board until 1960, was conceived by Nizam Osman Ali Khan, Asaf Jah VII in 1911.

== History ==
In the early 20th century, Nizams-ruled Hyderabad was affected by the large-scale flooding of the Musi river in 1908 and a deadly plague in 1911. This led to a decrease in population in the city. Then-Nizam Osman Ali Khan, Asaf Jah VII, who had just occupied the throne, was aware of these problems. Together with his ministers and city planners, the Nizam decided to improve the sanitation and hygiene of the city. The City Improvement Board was formed in 1912 with the Nizam's son Moazzam Jah as its President. The mandate of this entity was to bring about planned development of the city with its specific tasks being improvement of slums, housing for poor, acquiring open lands, underground drainage, road widening schemes and laying of roads to enable the use of buses. Sir Visvesvarayya was also requested to contribute with his ideas for the further improvement of the city. The board commenced operations at a building in Basheerbagh, which was built with a Regional Mughal Variation-styled architecture, and continued here for over four decades.

The board took up activities such as rehabilitation of slums in Dabeerpura, Sultan Shahi, Mughalpura, Nampally and Gunfoundry, Red Hills, Mallepally and those that were lined along the banks of Musi River. The board is also credited with the construction of the Nizamia Tibbi Hospital (near Charminar), Pathergatti complex, Moazzam Jahi Market, Andhra Pradesh High Court, Osmania Hospital and the City College. The architecture of domes and arches that was used for these projects became known as the CIB or the Osmanian style. Besides this, the board enhanced the look of Hyderabad by constructing elaborate gardens, planned housing colonies, potable drinking water supply, underground drainage with separate stormwater drains, wide roads and bus and train services, much before many of the major cities of India.

The Town Improvement Trust of Secunderabad was formed in the year 1931 with more or less similar objectives with emphasis on development of lands.

== Aims and objectives ==
The main objective of the Housing Board is to provide housing accommodation to the needy citizens at an affordable price.

The Telangana Housing Board is engaged in the following activities :

- Construction of houses under integrated / Composite Housing Schemes and allotment of houses under Lower Income Group, Middle Income Group and Higher Income Group categories.
- Self-Financing Scheme for Higher Income Group and Middle Income Group # Sites and Services
- Construction of shops, Commercial Complexes and Multistoried Buildings to be let out on rent to augment financial resources of the Board.
