= Moazzam Jahi Market =

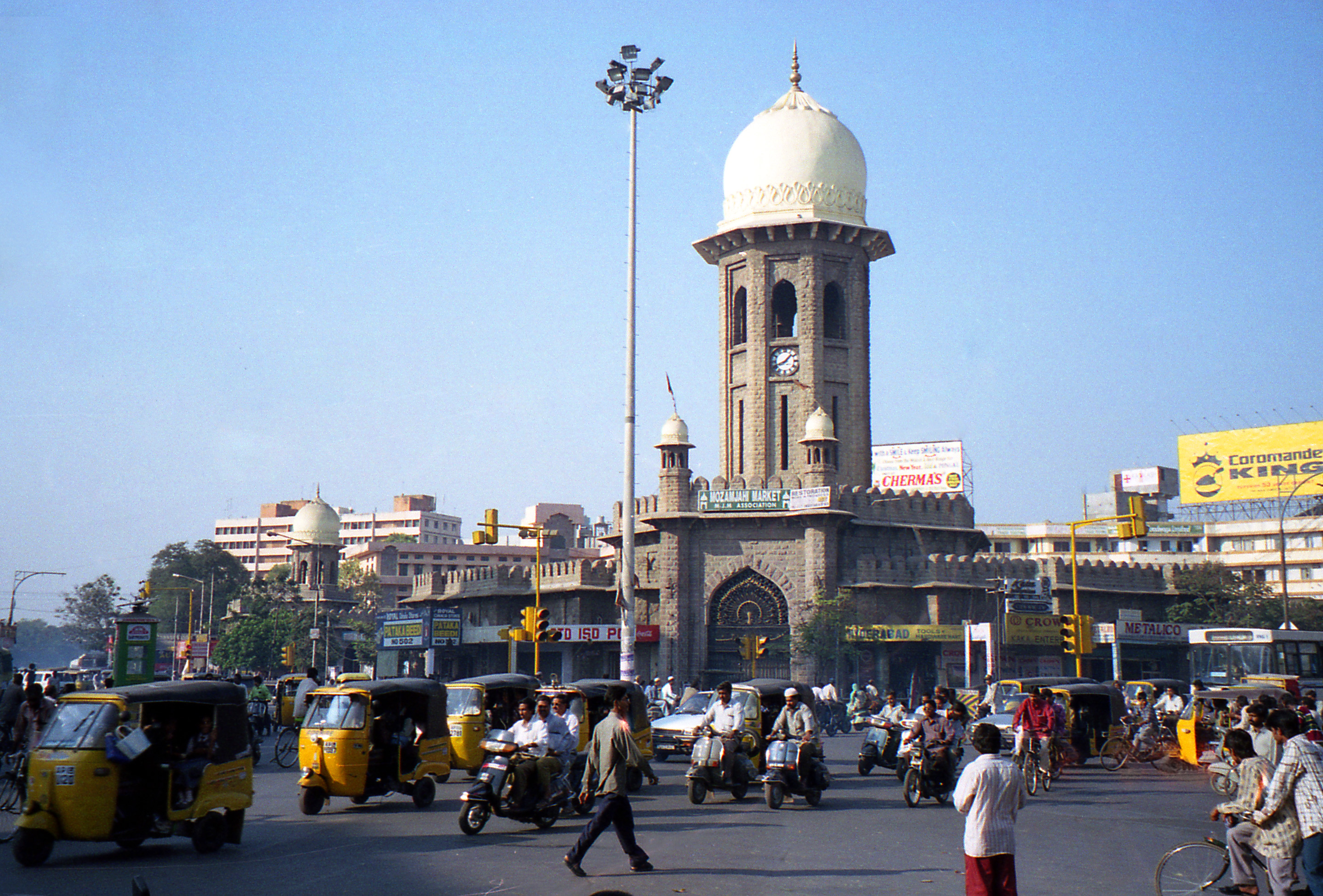

- Location within Hyderabad Moazzam Jahi Market (India)

General information
- Architectural style: CIB/Osmanian
- Location: Hyderabad, India
- Coordinates: 17.384500°N 78.475052°E
- Named for: Moazzam Jah
- Construction started: 1933
- Completed: 1935
- Cost: 4 lakh rupees

Technical details
- Material: Granite

Design and construction
- Architect: City Improvement Board

Moazzam Jahi Market is a historic market in Hyderabad, Telangana, India. Built in the twentieth century, it is located at the crossroads of Jam Bagh, Begum Bazaar, and Station Road.

== History ==
The Moazzam Jahi market was constructed in the period 1933-1935, during the reign of Mir Osman Ali Khan. It was conceived and implemented by the City Improvement Board (CIB), which was founded in 1912 by Osman Ali Khan for the development of Hyderabad. This was one of several projects undertaken by the Board as part of an urban renewal. The market was named after prince Moazzam Jah, second son of Osman Ali Khan and president of the CIB. The intention behind the market was to provide a commercial space in the area between Hyderabad Railway Station and the Residency. At the time, the primary market of Hyderabad was still Mir Alam Mandi, located in an older, more congested part of the city.

The building was intended to function as a fruit market, but in practice sold a variety of other produce and goods as well. In the 1980s, the building's fruit market was shifted to the Kothapet fruit market.

== Modern era ==
In recent years, Moazzam Jahi Market underwent an extensive heritage restoration to revive its original architectural character. The triangular granite structure, constructed between 1933 and 1935 and spread over 1.77 acres, had suffered from deterioration due to water seepage, rusted beams, and encroachments.

The restoration work, undertaken by the Greater Hyderabad Municipal Corporation (GHMC) in coordination with the Municipal Administration & Urban Development Department, Telangana (MA&UD) and conservation architects, included replacement of damaged iron beams, removal of non-original paint layers to expose the granite façade, repairs to the clock tower and finials, and installation of storm-water drainage to prevent flooding.

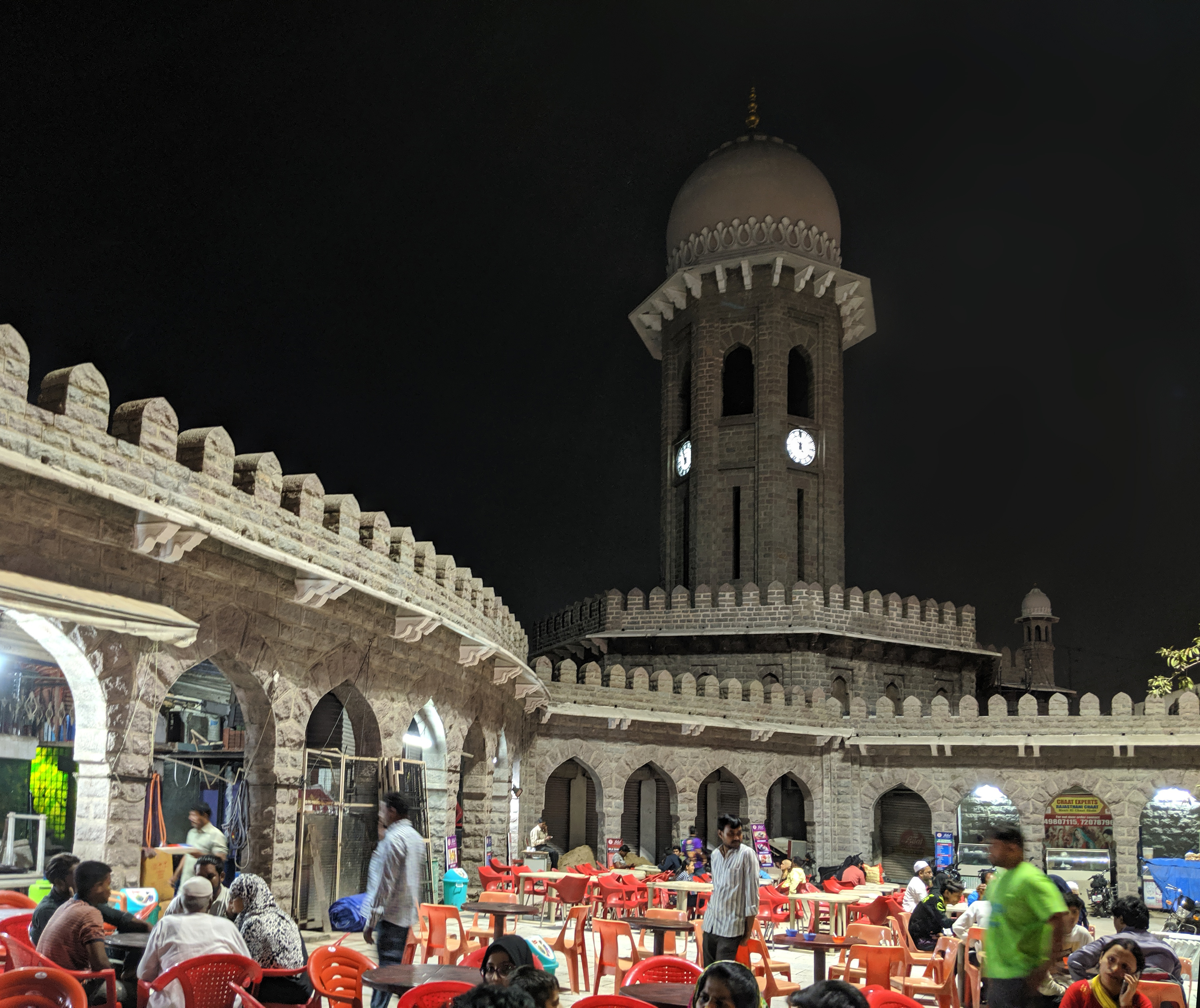
Moazzam Jahi Market at Night

A new flag-post was erected in the central courtyard of the market as part of the restoration, adding a visible symbol of civic pride.

Following the restoration, the market was formally reopened to the public on 15 August 2020.

Since reopening, the market again houses its well-known handmade ice-cream shops — Famous Ice Cream, Gafoor, and Bilal — and continues to function as a retail hub for fruits, vegetables, groceries and local produce.

The flag-post, with the national tricolour hoisted on a tall pole, is now a focal point in the courtyard and contributes to the market’s role as both a commercial venue and a heritage public space. For example, a 100 ft-tall flag-pole was reported during celebrations.

As part of its revival as a heritage precinct, the market has improved pedestrian access, heritage lighting and interpretation panels, and the state government envisions repurposing parts of the courtyard for cultural events, heritage walks and tourism-oriented activities.

Although the market’s primary role evolved over time (for example, the flower market that was once part of it moved elsewhere in 2009), the renewed focus on heritage, public amenity and visual identity including the prominent flag-post underscores Moazzam Jahi Market’s continuing significance in Hyderabad’s urban fabric.

== Architecture ==
The Moazzam Jahi Market is constructed primarily from locally quarried granite and arranged around a triangular layout with a central courtyard. Its design features arched corridors, colonnaded verandahs, and a large central dome that dominates the skyline. The building’s stone masonry and restrained ornamentation were intended to create both durability and visual harmony with Hyderabad’s surrounding civic structures built in the early 20th century.

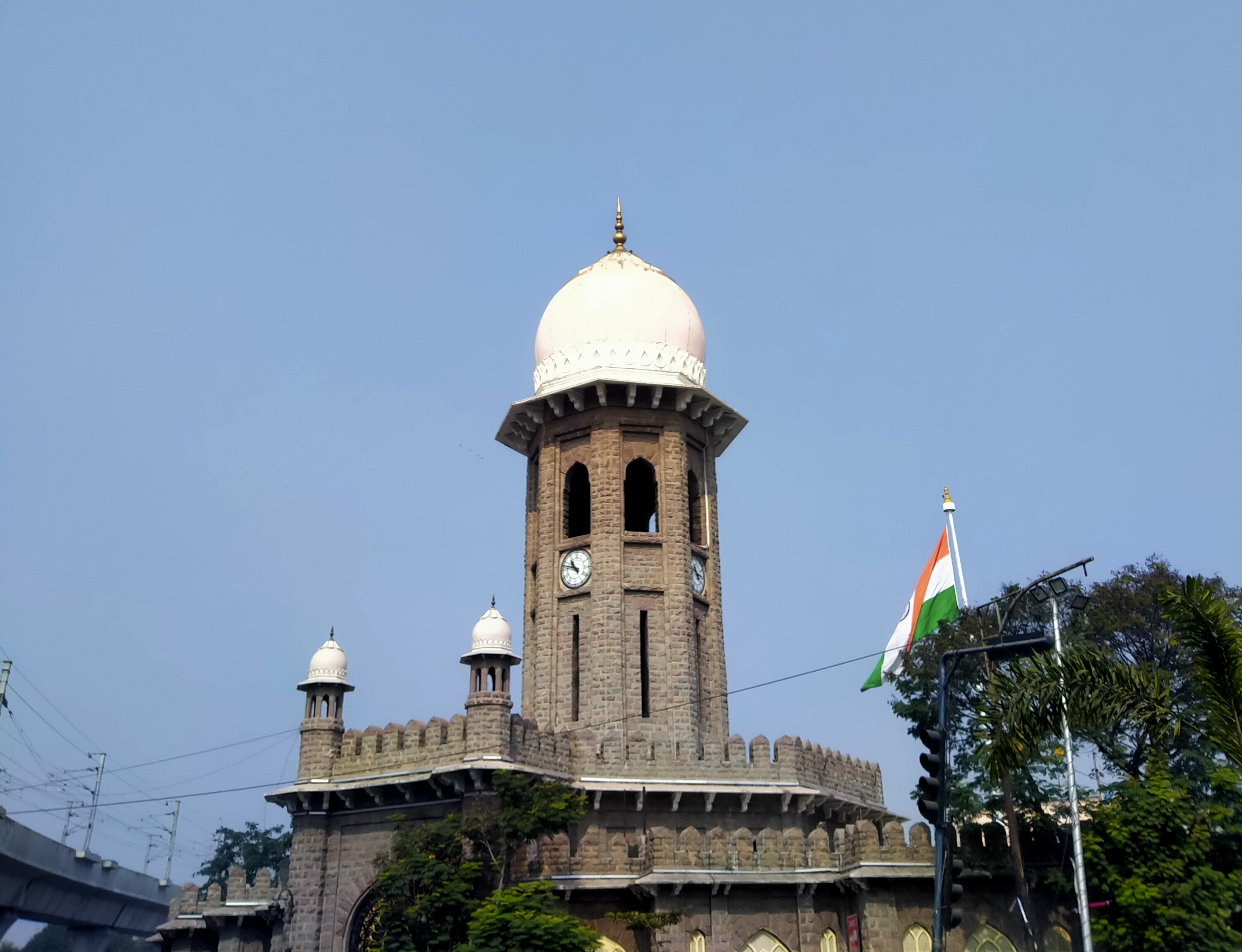
Moazzam Jahi Market Dome

The market exemplifies the “CIB” or “Osmanian” architectural style, a distinctive idiom developed by the City Improvement Board (CIB) during the reign of Mir Osman Ali Khan. This style sought to project a sense of modernity and secularism while drawing inspiration from earlier regional forms, including Kakatiya temple architecture, Qutb Shahi arches and domes, Mughal decorative motifs, and Asaf Jahi proportions. The result is a blend of Indo-Islamic and local Deccani influences expressed through robust stonework and balanced symmetry, making the market one of the finest surviving examples of Osmanian civic architecture in Hyderabad.

== See also ==
- Prince Moazzam Jah
