= Kushaiguda =

- Neighbourhood
- Location in Hyderabad, India Kushaiguda (India)
- Coordinates: 17°28′19″N 78°32′51″E
- Country: India
- State: Telangana
- District: Medchal-Malkajgiri
- Mandal: Kapra
- City: Hyderabad

Government
  - Body: Greater Hyderabad Municipal Corporation

Area
  - Total: 4 km^{2} (1.5 sq mi)

Languages
  - Official: Telugu
- Time zone: UTC+5:30 (IST)
- PIN: 500062 - ECIL Post
- Vehicle registration: TS
- Lok Sabha constituency: Malkajgiri
- Vidhan Sabha constituency: Uppal
- Planning agency: GHMC

Kushaiguda is a neighbourhood in Kapra Circle Greater Hyderabad, Telangana, India. This area is near ECIL Bus Terminal and offices of major companies like NFC, ECIL and HCL. The Kushaiguda Market is one of the biggest market in the Medchal District. District court complex for the Medchal-Malkajgiri district is located in Kushaiguda.

== Transport ==
Kushaiguda TSRTC bus depot is located near Kamala Nagar. Kushaiguda is well-connected by the buses, TSRTC, which ply on two routes covering most of the area.
