= Heritage structures in Hyderabad, India =

Heritage structures

The Heritage Conservation Committee under HUDA was formed by the state government in 1981 to retain architectural, historical and social value of buildings. Hyderabad Urban Development Authority has listed almost 160 buildings in Hyderabad in Telangana state as heritage structures. Almost 70% of heritage buildings are in private hands. Heritage structures include buildings, monuments, rock structures etc.

By notifying such structures, Heritage Conservation Committee in collaboration with (INTACH) works to retain their architectural, historical and social importance and tries to convince the owners not to destroy the listed heritage structures lured by the commercial potential of their properties. The buildings are graded as Grade I, Grade II & Grade III. However, experts feel due to lack of support from the state government it has become difficult to preserve the status of these buildings. Various buildings such as Ravi Bar, Adil Alam Mansion, Central Building Division & Devdi Ranachand – Ahotichand have been demolished but the names of these buildings are still being retained in the list.

== List of heritage buildings as per HUDA ==
Following are the list of the heritage buildings in Hyderabad recognized by HUDA. This list is constantly upgraded by HUDA. The buildings proposed by HUDA are to be approved by the state government.

Sl. No	Building	Location	Image
1	Adil Alam Mansion, (Deleted from list). Demolished	Nampally	-
2	Afzal Gunj Mosque	Afzal Gunj	
3	Air & Land Warfare Building,	Secunderabad	-
4	Aiwan-e-Ali	Chowmahalla Palace	-
5	Aliabad Sarai	Falaknuma-Charminar main road	--
6	Allahuddins Building	Begumpet	-
7	Ameen Manzil. Demolished	Saidabad	
8	Amberpet Burj	Amberpet	--
9	State Central Library	Afzal Gunj	
10	Andhra Patrika Building	Basheerbagh	
11	High Court of Judicature at Hyderabad	Hyderabad	
12	State Archaeological Museum	Koti	
13	Asmangarh Palace	Malakpet	
14	Asman Mahal	Lakdi-ka-pool	-
15	Azha Khana-e-Zehra	Darulshifa	
16	Bai Pirojbai Edulji Chenai Parsi Dharamshala	Secunderabad	-
17	Baradari of Nawab Khursheed Jah Bahadur	Hussaini Alam	
18	Baitul Ashraf	near Niloufer Hospital	--
19	Baquer Bagh	Saidabad	-
20	Bella Vista (Administrative Staff College of India)	Saifabad	
21	Bhagawandas Garden Pavilion	Karawan	-
22	a) Charkaman; b) Machlikaman c) Kalikaman d) Sher-e-Batil-Ki-Kaman	Charminar	
23	Chowmahalla Palace	Hyderabad	
24	City College	Madina	
25	Secunderabad Clock Tower	Secunderabad	
26	Clock Tower Sultan Bazaar	Sultan Bazar	-
27	Clock Tower & Ramgopalpet Police Station	James Street	
28	Clock Tower Fateh Maidan	Fateh Maidan	
30	Clock Tower – Mahboob Chowk	Charminar	
31	Dargah Hazrath Shajauddin	Yakutpura	-
32	Dargah Nooruddin Shah Gate portion	Nampally	-
33	Dargah Syed Shah Mir Mahmood Wali	Bahadurpura	-
34	Dargah Yousufain	Nampally	-
35	Darush Shifa & Mosque	Dabeerpura	-
36	Devdi Akram Ali Khan, Gate Portion	Yakutpura	-
37	Devdi Asman Jah	Hussaini Alam	-
38	Devdi Bansilal	Begum Bazar	-
39	Devdi Iqbal-ud-Doula	Shah Gunj	
40	Devdi Imaad Jung Bahadur	Gunfoundry	-
41	Devdi Fareed Nawaz Jung	Begumpet	
42	Devdi Nawab Shamsheer Jung	Yakutpura	-
43	Devdi Maharaja Kishan Pershad Bahadur	Shalibanda Road	-
44	Dewan Devdi – Gate Portion	Pathar Gatti	
45	Gyan Bagh Palace	Goshamahal	
46	Directorate of Industries	Chirag Ali Lane, Abids	
47	Errum Manzil	Punjagutta	
48	Falaknuma Palace	Falaknuma	
49	Gandhi Medical College old building. Demolished	Basheerbagh	-
50	Golden Threshold	Nampally Station Road, Abids	
51	Hyderabad Public School	Begumpet	
52	Jama Masjid	Charminar	
53	Jawahar Bal Bhavan	Public Gardens, Nampally	
54	Jhamsingh Temple – Gate Portion	Mehdipatnam	-
55	Jubilee Hall	Nampally	
56	Kaman Chatta Bazar	Darulshifa	-
57	King Koti Complex: a) Hospital (old) b) Usman Mansion c) Nazri Bagh . Partially demolished.	Hyderguda	
58	British Residency Complex (Women’s College, Koti)	Koti	
59	Kishan Bagh Temple	Bahadurpura	
60	Lakshmi Paper Mart’s Building	James Street	
61	Nizamia Observatory	Panjagutta	
62	Maharaja Chandulal Temple	Alwal	
63	Mahboob Chowk Mosque	Mahboob Chowk	-
64	Mahboob Mansion	Malakpet	
65	Malwala Palace – Main Courtyard, Secondary Courtyard & Residential quarters. Demolished.	Charminar	
66	Manjhli Begum Ki Haveli. Demolished.	Shali Banda road	-
67	Mushk Mahal	Attapur	
68	Moghulpura Tombs	Moghalpura	-
69	Mohanlal Malani’s residence	James Street	-
70	Monty’s Hotel Demolished.	Parklane, Secunderabad	
71	Mosque	near Jhamsingh Temple, Mehedipatnam	-
72	Moazzam Jahi Market	Mojam Jahi Market	
73	Nanu Bhai G. Shah’s Building	Sultan Bazar	-
74	Nizam Club	Saifabad	-
75	Nizam College	Basheerbagh	
76	Osmania Arts College	Hyderabad	
77	Osmania General Hospital	Afzal Gunj	
78	Lady Hydari Club	Basheerbagh	-
79	Paigah Palace (Vikhar-ul-Umra Palace)	Begumpet	
80	Parsi Fire Temple	Secunderabad	
81	Prakash Building	Shivajinagar	-
82	Princess Esin Women’s Educational Centre	Purani Haveli	-
83	Puranapul bridge	Purana Pul	
84	Purani Haveli Complex	Pathar Gatti	
85	Qila Kohna & Mosque	Saroornagar	
86	Raja Bhagwandas Building	Sultan Bazar	-
87	Shahi Jilu Khana (Deleted from list )	Ghansi Bazaar	-
88	Shahi Khilwat Khana	-	-
89	Sitaram Bagh Temple	Mangalghat	
90	Spanish Mosque	Begumpet	
91	St. George's Church, Hyderabad	Abids	
92	St. Mary's Church, Secunderabad	Secunderabad	
93	St. John's Church, Secunderabad	Marredpally	
94	St Joseph's Cathedral, Hyderabad	Abids	
95	Shamraj Bahadur - Gate Portion	Shah-Ali-Banda	-
96	Vikhar Manzil	Begumpet	
97	Victoria Memorial Orphanage	Saroornagar	
98	Victoria Maternity Hospital	Asaf Jahi Road	
99	Government Unani Hospital	Charminar	
100	Vilayath Manzil	Begumpet	-
101	Homeopathic Hospital (Moti Mahal)	Mahboob Chowk, Motigalli	-
102	Fakhr-ul-Mulk Tomb	Sanathnagar	-
103	Vijay Marie Church	AC Guards, Masab Tank	-
104	Puranmal Samadhi	Sitaram Bagh	-
105	Hill Fort Palace	Adarsh Nagar	
106	D. Lakshmaiah’s residence,	Monda Market	-
107	D. Pentaiah’s residence	Monda Market	-
108	Sardar Mahal	Moghal Pura	
109	Raza Ali Bungalow	Near Fever Hospital	-
110	Façade – Baitul Ghous	Moazzam Jahi Market	-
111	Façade – Hifazath Hussain	-	-
112	Goshamal Baradari	Goshamahal	
113	Prem Chand’s residence	Sardar Patel Road	-
114	Shyam Rao Chungi’s residence	Padmarao Nagar	-
115	Dilkusha Guest House	Raj Bhavan Road	-
116	College of Nursing	Raj Bhavan Road	-
117	Yousuf Tekri	Tolichowki	-
118	Khusro Manzil. Demolished.	A.C. Guards	
119	Devdi Ranachand – Ahotichand, (Deleted). Demolished	Mehdipatnam	-
120	Panj Mahalla Demolished.	Lingampally	-
121	Parwarish Bagh	Lingampally	-
122	Central Bank Building	Koti	-
123	Mini Bal Bhavan	Public Garden	-
124	Taj Mahal hotel (Old Block),	Abids	
125	Ravi Bar, Troop Bazar (Deleted from list by Government and demolished)	Troop Bazaar	-
126	Hyderabad Central Building Division’s office	Moazzam Jahi Market	-
127	Roshan Mahal	Moghal Pura	
128	Central Co-operative Training College	Nizam College Road	-
129	Mahboobia Girls High School & Junior College Madraasa-E-Aliya,	Gunfoundry	
130	Reddy Hostel	Abids	-
131	Mahal Wanaparthi	Jambagh Road, Mozamjahi Market	
132	A. Majeed Khan’s residence	Purani Haveli	-
133	Old M.C.H. Office,	Darush Shifa	-
134	Greenlands Guest House	Begumpet	-
135	Raj Bhavan Old Building	Raj Bhavan	-
136	Old Jail Complex	Monda Market Road	-
137	St. George's Grammar School Complex	Abids	
138	Wesley Church	Secunderabad	-
139	Nampally Sarai	Nampally	-
140	Bhoiguda Kaman	Mangalhaat	-
141	IAS Officers Association	Greenlands, Begumpet	-
142	St. Mary's Presbytery	St. Anns School, Secunderabad	-
143	Krishna Reddy's Building . Demolished.	Mehdipatnam	-

== Heritage rock formations in Hyderabad ==
In addition to various buildings, INTACH has classified various rock formation under heritage category. These are

Sl. No	Rock structure	Location	Image
1	"Bear’s Nose"	inside Shilparamam, Madhapur	-
2	"Cliff Rock"	Jubilee Hills	-
3	Hillocks around Durgam Cheruvu Lake,	Jubilee Hills	
4	"Monster Rock"	near Film Nagar Jubilee Hills	-
5	"Obelisk"	Jubilee Hills	-
6	"Mushroom Rock"	inside the University of Hyderabad Campus	
7	Rock Park	Old Bombay Road near Dargah Hussain Shah Wali	-
8	Sentinel Rock	near Moula-Ali	
9	Rocks at Maula Ali's Dargah	Moula-Ali	
10	"Toadstool"	next to Blue Cross, Jubilee Hills	-

== See also ==
- Heritage conservation
- Architectural conservation
- Sustainable preservation
- World Heritage Site
