= List of clock towers in India =

This is a list of notable clock towers in India.

== List ==
Name	City/Town	State/Province	Built	Image	Notes		
Sundarbai Khandelwal Tower	Akola	Maharashtra	1962 (12 February)				
Aligarh Clock Tower	Aligarh	Uttar Pradesh					
Bahraich Clock Tower	Bahraich	Uttar Pradesh					
Clock Tower Bijnor	Bijnor	Uttar Pradesh					
Ghantaghar	Bhagalpur	Bihar					
Chennai Central railway station	Chennai	Tamil Nadu	1900				
Clock tower	Chennai	Tamil Nadu	1948				
Ripon Building	Chennai	Tamil Nadu	1913				
Annamalai University Clock Tower	Chidambaram	Tamil Nadu					
TNAU Clock Tower	Coimbatore	Tamil Nadu					
Ghantaghar	Dehradun	Uttarakhand	1953				
Clock Tower, Rashtrapati Bhavan	New Delhi	National Capital Territory	1924		Built by Sir Edwin Lutyens and team, the clock tower was restored in 2013.		
Ghantaghar	Delhi	National Capital Territory	1870		Partially collapsed in 1950 and subsequently dismantled		
Ghantaghar	Delhi	National Capital Territory					
Hari Nagar Ghantaghar	Delhi	National Capital Territory					
Clock Tower, Erode	Erode	Tamil Nadu					
Clock tower	Faizabad	Uttar Pradesh					
Ram Narain Periwal Clock Tower	Fazilka	Punjab					
Ghantaghar Gorakhpur	Gorakhpur	Uttar Pradesh	1930				
Clock Tower of Haridwar	Haridwar	Uttarakhand	1938				
IIEST Shibpur clock tower	Howrah	West Bengal					
Hooghly Imambara clock tower	Hooghly	West Bengal	1861				
Mahboob Chowk Clock Tower	Hyderabad	Telangana	1892				
Secunderabad Clock Tower	Hyderabad	Telangana	1897				
Shah Ali Banda Clock Tower	Hyderabad	Telangana	1904				
Sultan Bazar Clock Tower	Hyderabad	Telangana	1865		Fateh Maidan Clock Tower	Hyderabad	1904
Ghanta Ghar	Jodhpur	Rajasthan					
Clock tower	Kalimpong	West Bengal					
Clock Tower at Christ Church	Kasauli	Himachal Pradesh					
Lake Town Clock Tower	Lake Town, Kolkata	West Bengal					
Chinnakada Clock Tower	Kollam	Kerala	1944				
Lawrence School, Lovedale Clock Tower	Lovedale	Tamil Nadu					
Husainabad Clock Tower	Lucknow	Uttar Pradesh	1881				
Chaura Bazaar clock tower	Ludhiana	Punjab					
Clock Tower, Meerut	Meerut						
Mirzapur Clock Tower	Mirzapur	Uttar Pradesh					
Rajabai Tower	Mumbai	Maharashtra	1878				
Ghari Ghar	Murshidabad	West Bengal					
Clock tower	Nagercoil	Tamil Nadu					
Lytton Memorial Clock Tower	Nahan	Himachal Pradesh	1877		The Lytton memorial was built in 1877 by Raja Shamsher Prakash commemorating Lord Lytton's visit to Nahan .		
BITS Pilani Main Building The Clock Tower	Pilani	Rajasthan	1964				
Aberdeen Clock Tower	Port Blair	Andaman and Nicobar Islands					
Ghadi Chowk, Raipur	Raipur	Chhattisgarh	1995 (19 December)				
Saifai Clock Tower	Saifai	Uttar Pradesh					
Sardarshahar Clock Tower	Sardarshahar	Rajasthan					
Mohamedally Tower	Siddhpur	Gujarat	1915 (4 April)				
Golden Rock Railway Workshop	Tiruchirappalli	Tamil Nadu					
NIT Trichy Clock Tower	Tiruchirapalli	Tamil Nadu					
Ghanta Ghar	Ujjain	Madhya Pradesh					
King George Hospital Clock Tower	Visakhapatnam	Andhra Pradesh	1923				
Chimnabai Clock Tower	Vadodara	Gujarat	1896		It was constructed from the funds raised by the citizens of Baroda State and named after Chimnabai I (1864–1885), a queen and the first wife of Sayajirao Gaekwad III of Baroda State.		
Ghanta Ghar	Srinagar	Jammu & Kashmir	1980				
New Market Clock Tower	Kolkata	West Bengal	1874		It was commissioned alongside the construction of the New Market itself. The tower is a prominent feature of the market, known for its Victorian Gothic style and red brick construction.		
