= Ranigunj, Secunderabad =

Ranigunj
- Neighbourhood
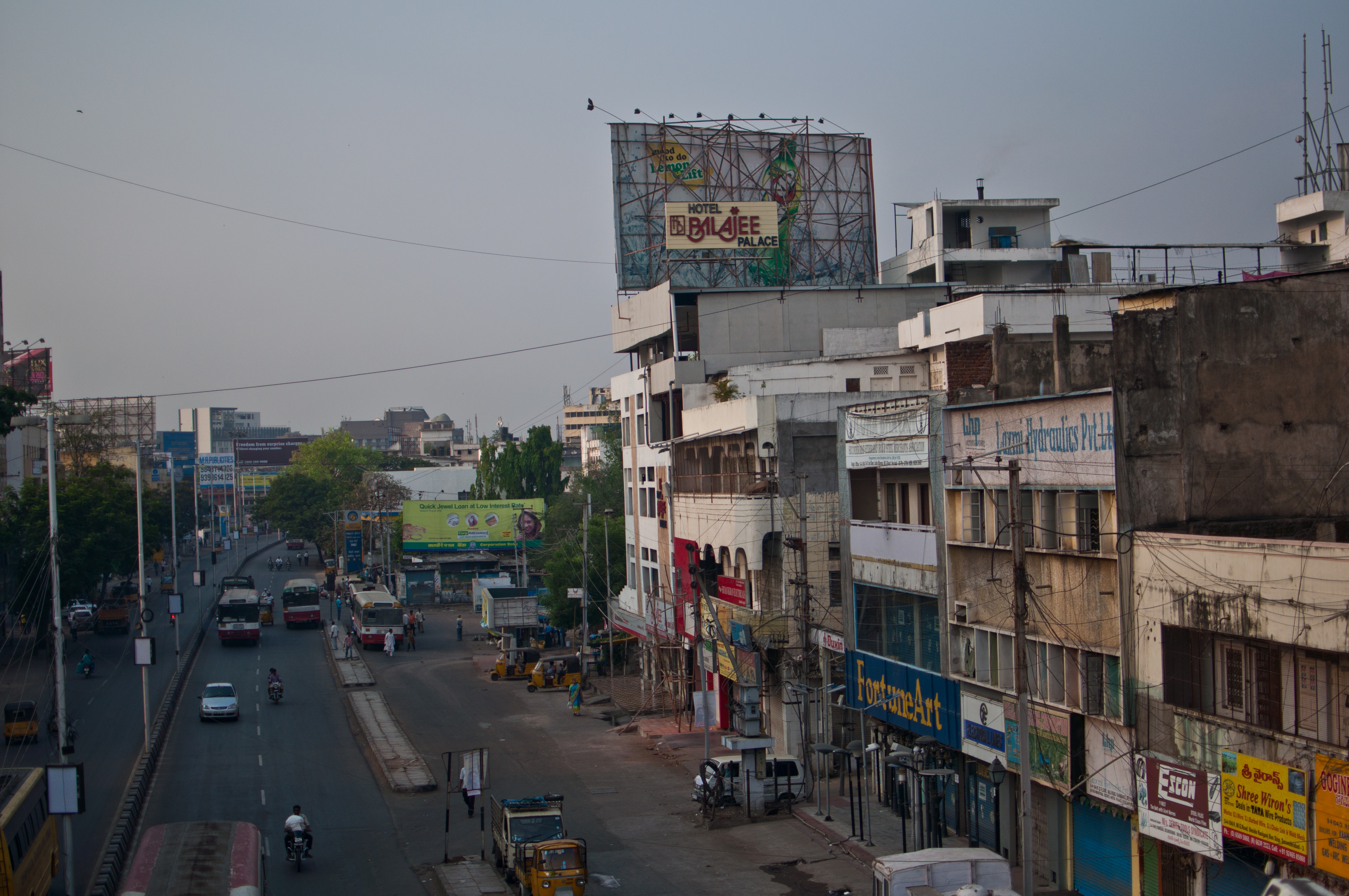
- MG Road, the main thoroughfare in Ranigunj

- Location in Hyderabad, India Ranigunj (India)
- Coordinates: 17°25′48″N 78°29′23″E
- Country: India
- State: Telangana
- District: Hyderabad District
- City: Hyderabad
- Named for: Queen Victoria

Government
  - Body: GHMC

Languages
  - Official: Telugu
- Time zone: UTC+5:30 (IST)
- PIN: 500003
- Vehicle registration: TG
- Lok Sabha constituency: Secunderabad Lok Sabha constituency
- Vidhan Sabha constituency: Cantonment
- Planning agency: GHMC

Ranigunj is a major and a very busy locality in Secunderabad, India. Mahatma Gandhi Road (previously known as James Street) is the major thoroughfare in this locality. Various heritage structures such as James Street Police Station, Parsi Fire Temple, Saidani Ma Tomb etc. are located here.

Ranigunj derives its name after Victoria Grain Market or Queen's Market. An arch at the entry to market still stands. The arch was the gateway to the market and was built in 1877 to commemorate the Queen Victoria's Delhi Durbar of 1877. The market today is no longer only a grain market but a popular market for hardware and tools. Some of the oldest markets in Secunderabad such as Regimental Bazaar and General Bazaar are located in Ranigunj.

== Transport ==
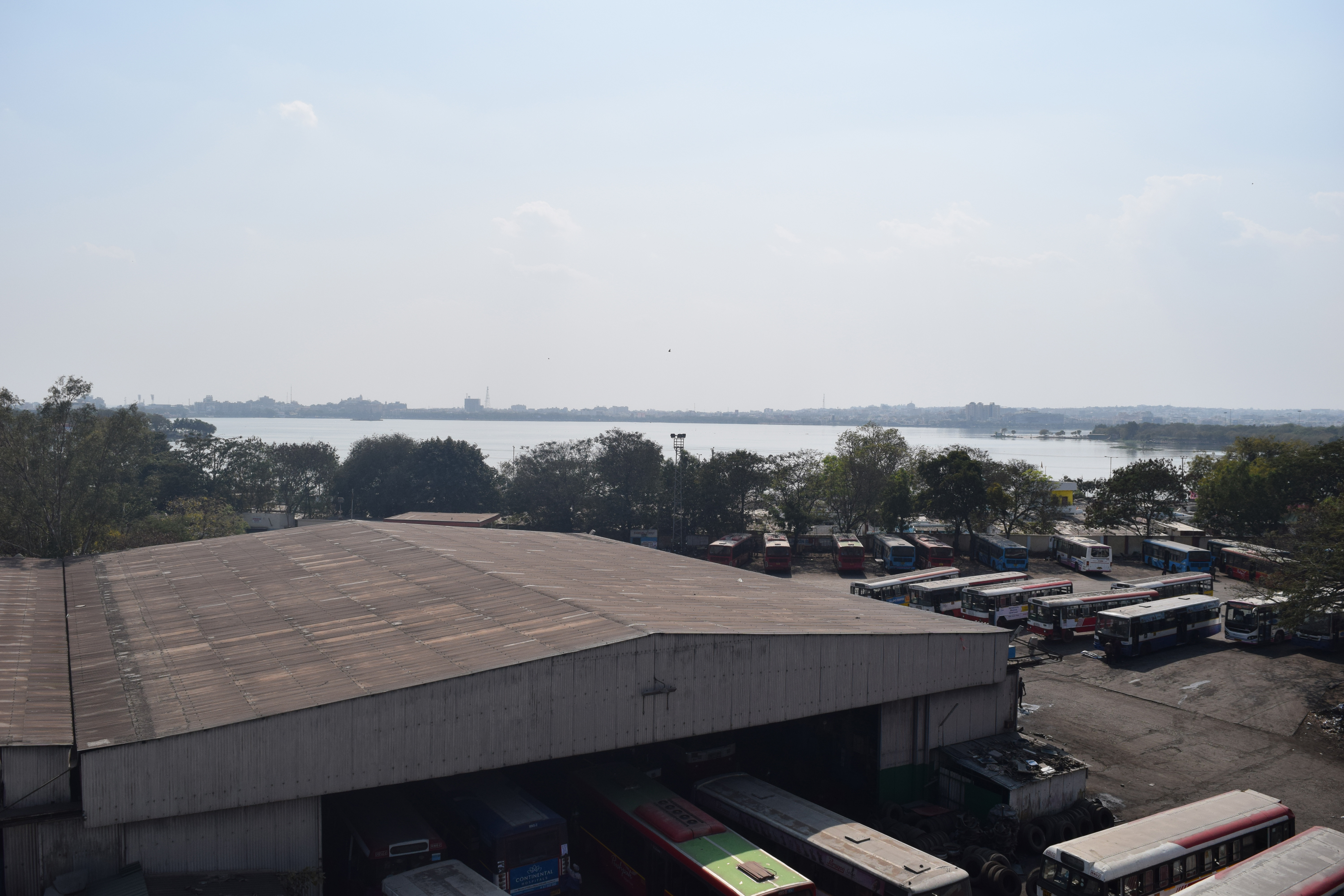
Ranigunj Bus Depot

.

There are many buses run by TGSRTC (Telangana State Road Transport Corporation) that connect to Hyderabad and Secunderabad. This locality has a major bus depot. The closest MMTS Train station is at James Street.
