= Rashtrapati Road =

Road in Hyderabad, India

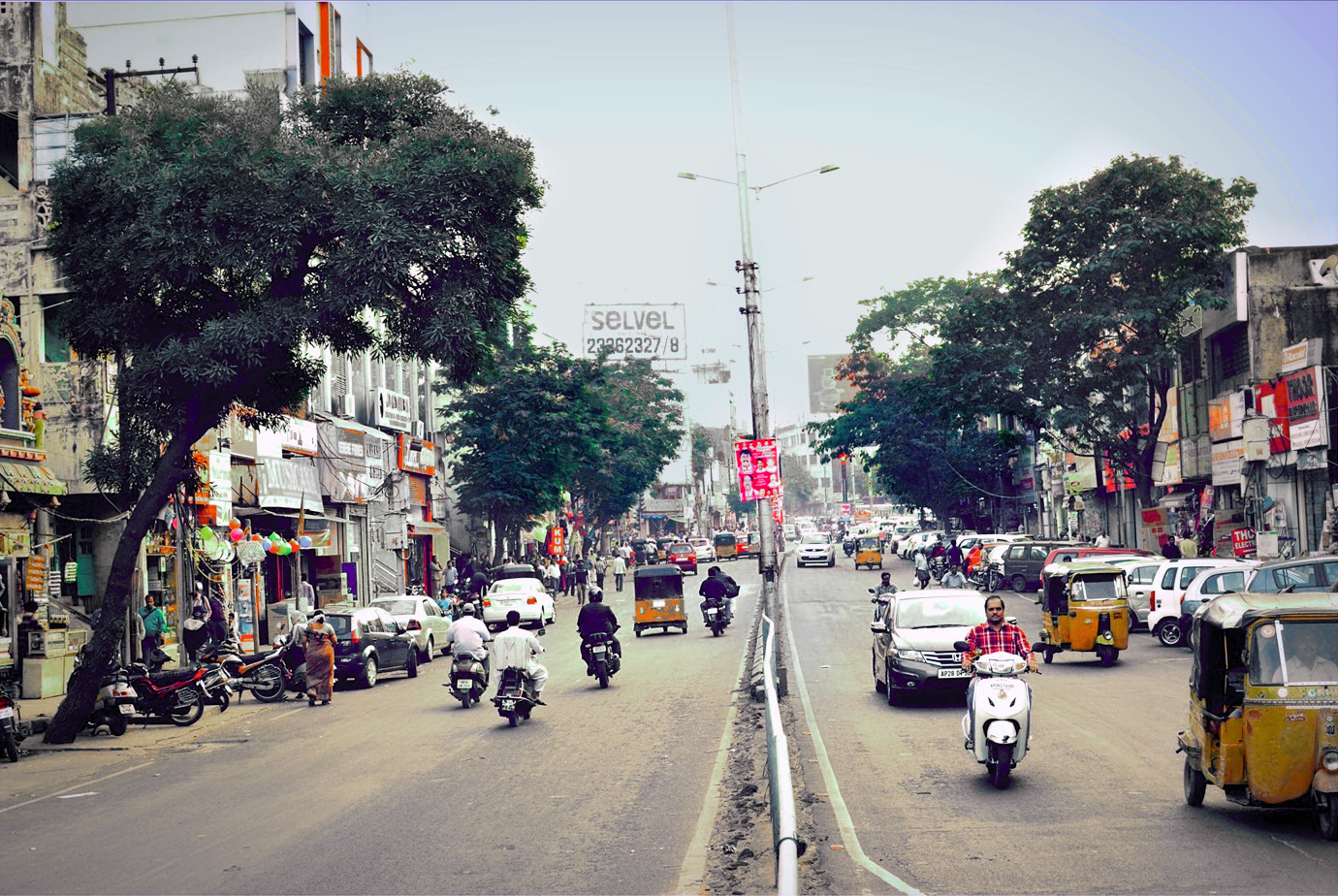

Route information
- Maintained by Greater Hyderabad Municipal Corporation, Hyderabad Metropolitan Development Authority
- Length: 1.16 km (0.72 mi)
- Existed: 1930s–present

Major junctions
- North end: Sardar Patel Road
- Bhoiguda; Rani Gunj; Shivaji Nagar; Kalasiguda
- South end: Tank Bund Road

Location
- Country: India
- States: Telangana

Highway system
- Roads in India; Expressways; National; State; Asian

Rashtrapati Road previously known as Kingsway also known as RP Road is a major road in Secunderabad connecting Sardar Patel Road to Tank Bund Road. The road was built in 1930s to decongest James Street (present MG Road). The road was named after Albert Frederick Arthur George, the then king of the United Kingdom, who had passed through this road in 1940s. It was subsequently renamed as Rashtrapati Road after India attained independence. Locals claim that initially the width of road was 100 feet (30 m) with 15 feet (4.6 m) wide pavement on both the sides. Presently due to encroachment, this has drastically reduced.
