= Monty's Hotel, Secunderabad =

Montgomery Hotel & Bar
- Interactive map of Montgomery Hotel & Bar

Restaurant information
- Established: 1880
- Owners: A Ramesh and Sons
- Previous owner: East India Company
- Location: 108, Sarojini Devi Road, Secunderabad, India, Andhra Pradesh, India
- Coordinates: 17.4418242°N 78.4898901°E
- Reservations: No
- Other locations: No

Monty's Hotel or Montgomery Hotel & Bar, is a historic hospitality establishment located at Park Lane in Secunderabad, India, dating back to the 1880s. Renowned for its association with British officers and its iconic bar, Monty's became one of the notable landmarks of the area but has since seen its prominence fade, with its current status marked by heritage protection and urban challenges.

== History ==
Monty's Hotel was founded in the 1880s during the British colonial era in Secunderabad. The building was constructed between 1880-90 by a Parsi and then served as a bar for the British and it quickly earned popularity among British Army officers, who were posted in the twin cities of Hyderabad and Secunderabad, and became a cultural hub for expatriates and local elites. The property was strategically located in Park Lane, a well-known neighborhood which still carries traces of colonial architecture and urban design. Monty's Bar remained a celebrated gathering place for well over a century, contributing to the social vibrancy of Secunderabad.

== Architectural Features ==
Monty's Hotel offers glimpses into late 19th-century colonial architecture, with its exterior documented as recently as 2008. The hotel has gothic traceried windows, steep pitched roofs with wooden bracings and an imposing European facade. The building was recognized for its distinct façade and spacious interiors.

== Heritage Status ==
Monty's was initially listed among Hyderabad's official heritage structures and was declared as a Grade II B heritage structure by the Hyderabad Urban Development Authority (HUDA). However, there were periods when its heritage status faced threats from urban development, with attempts to delist it arousing concern among activists. Ultimately, a High Court order reinstated its status, securing it from demolition or major alteration.
