= Khusro Manzil =

General information
- Location: A.C. Guards, Hyderabad
- Completed: 1920

Khusro Manzil was the residence of Chief Commanding Officer of the seventh Nizam's forces Khusro Jung Bahadur. The building was located at Lakdi-ka-Pul. The building was listed under HUDA as a grade III heritage structure.

The building was built in 1920. The ownership of the building changed various times and in August 2013 the structure faced a demolition threat. In 2021, a portion of the building was demolished illegally. In 2022, it is completely demolished for a new huge private housing project by some developers.The structure was listed as a heritage building due to its Corinthian portico and the huge European type columns
