= Allahuddins Building =

- Interactive map of the Allahuddins Building area

General information
- Type: Mansion
- Location: Hyderabad, India
- Coordinates: 17.44523°N 78.46623°E
- Completed: 1933–1934

Allahuddins Building is a historic building located in Hyderabad, Telangana, India. It is located at Begumpet.

This building belongs to the family of Ghulam Allauddin. The house of Allauddin and Sons was one of the most important house in the commercial world of the Nizam's Dominion. The plan of the building started in 1933 and was completed in 1934, during the reign of Mir Osman Ali Khan. The building has coloured glass facade with intricate metal frames and grills and an external ornate staircase. It is classified as Grade -1 heritage site by Hyderabad Urban Development Authority, a state-government organisation. The compound wall in the front of the building was demolished as part of works related to construction of Hyderabad Metro.
