= Shaikpet Mosque and Sarai =

Former mosque and sarai (resthouse) in Hyderabad, Telangana, India

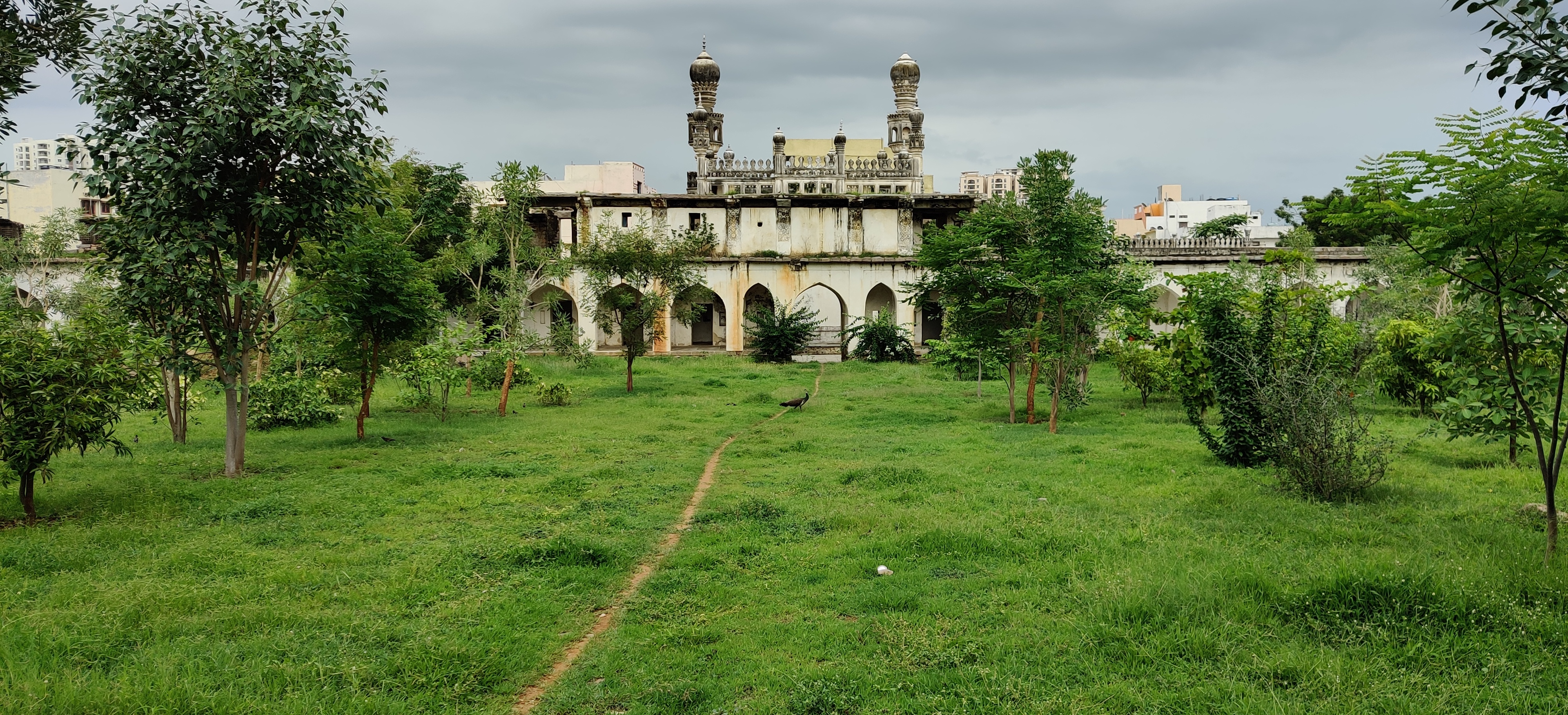
- The former mosque in 2020

- Location of the former mosque and caravanserai in Hyderabad

Religion
- Affiliation: Islam (former)
- Ecclesiastical or organizational status: Mosque and caravanserai (former)
- Status: Abandoned; (partial ruinous state)

Location
- Location: Golconda, Hyderabad, Hyderabad District, Telangana
- Country: India
- Interactive map of Shaikpet Mosque and Sarai
- Coordinates: 17°24′23″N 78°23′48″E

Architecture
- Type: Mosque architecture
- Style: Qutb Shahi
- Founder: Abdullah Qutb Shah
- Completed: 1043 AH (1633/1634 CE)

Specifications
- Dome: Three
- Minaret: Two (maybe more)
- Inscriptions: Six; four Persian verses
- Materials: Limestone; basalt; porcelain tiles

The Shaikpet Mosque and Sarai is a former mosque and a sarai (rest house) in a partial ruinous state, located near Golconda in Hyderabad, in the Hyderabad District of the state of Telangana, India. The former mosque and serai are listed as a state protected monument.

== History ==
It was built by Abdullah Qutb Shah in 1043 AH (1633/1634 CE) for the benefit of various travellers to Golconda and was located on the way to Bidar. It is a heritage structure and, as of 2018, was in need of restoration.

== Architecture ==
=== Mosque ===
The former mosque stands upon a rectangular plinth. The plinth measures 37 by 24 metres (121 by 78 ft), and has a height of 0.91 metres (3 ft). The mosque is constructed out of limestone. The façade has three arched entrances, each being about 4.6 metres (15 ft) high and 3.0 metres (10 ft) wide. Above the entrances is a band, approximately 0.91 metres (3 ft) with, of blue, green, and yellow enameled tiles, with white text. Most of the tiles have fallen off. The roof of the mosque is supported by three shallow domes.

There are traces of enameled tile-work in the interior of the mosque. The western wall contains six panels of inscriptions, carved in black basalt. Four of these contain Persian verses, one contains an excerpt from the Quran, and the final panel records the date of its construction as 1043 AH (1633/1634 CE).

== Sarai ==
The sarai had 30 rooms, stables for horses and camels, and a tomb of an unknown Sufi saint. It could accommodate 500 people.

== Gallery ==
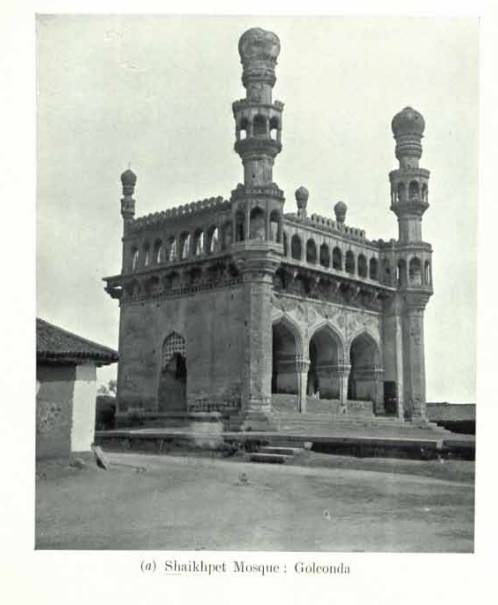
Shaikpet Mosque

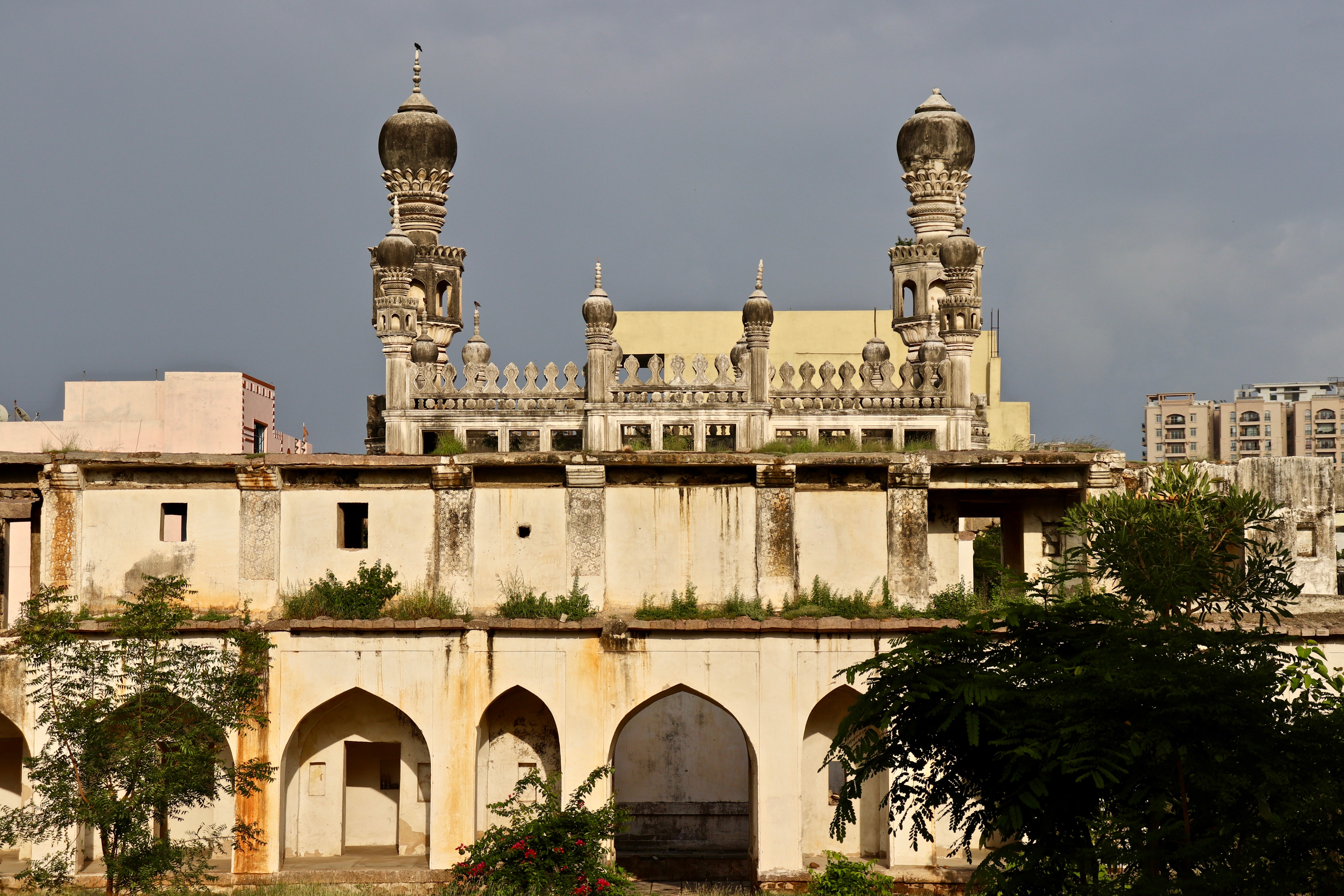
Shaikpet mosque and Sarai

== See also ==
- Islam in India
- List of mosques in Telangana
- Nampally Sarai
