= Kurmalguda =

- Location in Telangana, India
- Coordinates: 17.2667569°N 78.4545353°E
- Country: India
- State: Telangana

Government
  - Type: Municipality
  - Body: Greater Hyderabad Municipal Corporation(GHMC)

Languages
  - Official: Telugu
- Time zone: UTC+5:30 (IST)
- PIN: 500026
- Telephone code: 040
- Vehicle registration: TS-26 X XXXX
- Sex ratio: 1:1(approx) ♂/♀

Kurmalguda is a village in Hyderabad district in Telangana, India.
