= Sitaram Bagh temple =

Sitaram Bagh Temple
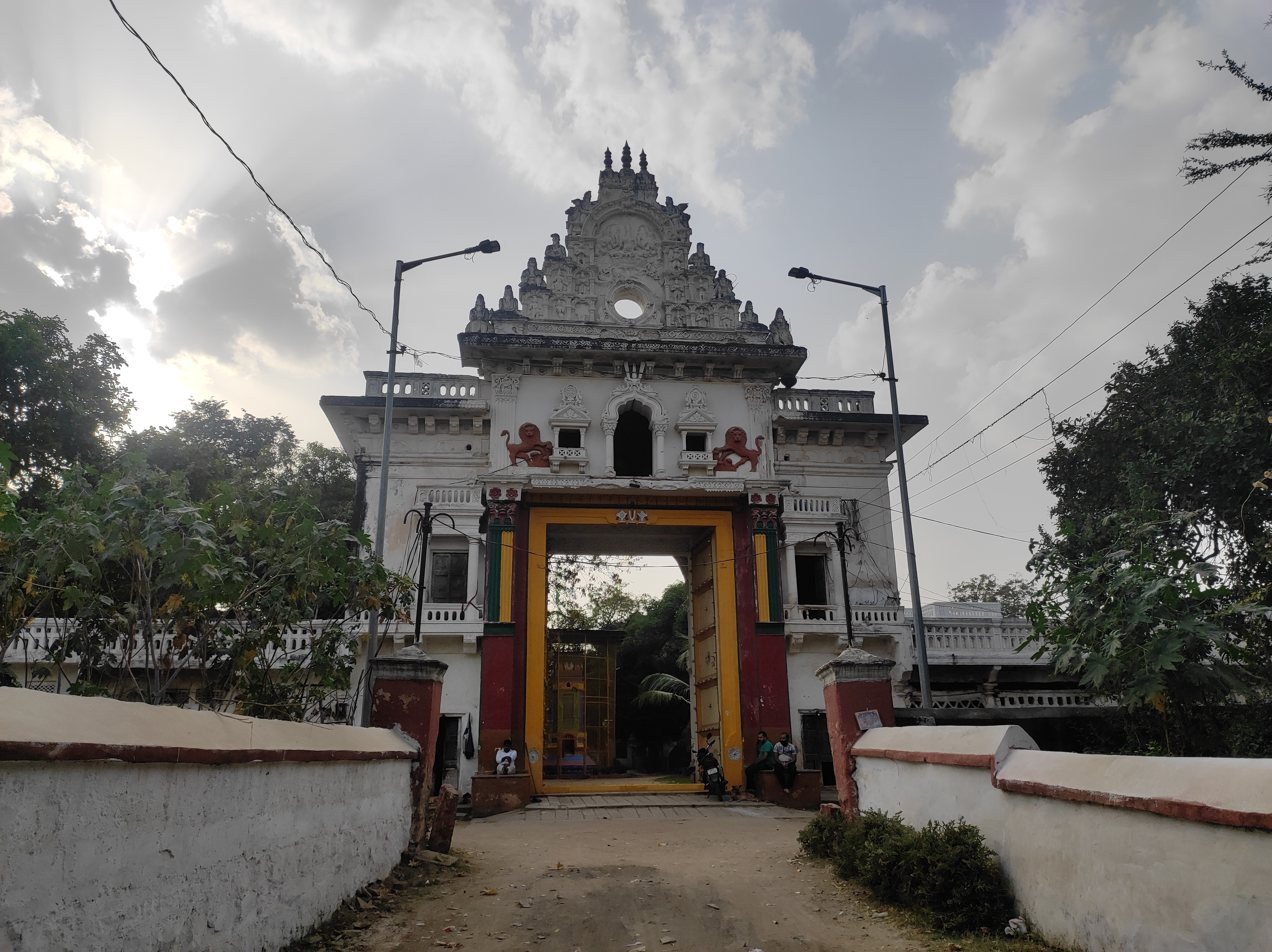
- A view of Sitaram Bagh Temple entrance in 2022

Religion
- Affiliation: Hinduism
- Deity: Sita, Rama, Hanuman

Location
- Location: Mangalhat, Hyderabad
- State: Telangana
- Country: India
- Interactive map of Sitaram Bagh Temple
- Coordinates: 17°23′3.60064″N 78°27′25.10464″E

Architecture
- Type: Mughal – Rajput – Qutb Shahi
- Creator: Puranmal Ganeriwala
- Completed: 1825

Sitaram Bagh Temple or Seetharambagh temple, is an old temple located in Mangalhat, a suburb of Hyderabad, Telangana in India. The temple was built by Seth Puranmal Ganeriwala, who worked as a banker for the Nizams of Hyderabad and was a member of the Ganeriwala family. The temple was built at Mallepally which was then a village at the outskirts of the city. The temple was built with six wells in its premises out of which one is now defunct. For the maintenance and upkeep of the temple, the 4th Nizam-Nasir-ud-Daulah had granted revenue from two villages in Berar as a jagir. Sitaram Bagh Temple is spread over 25 acres and covered with 20 feet (6.1 m) wall, which reportedly had offered protection to people from Razakars in the late 1940s. The temple is classified as a heritage building by INTACH. The 7th Nizam of Hyderabad Mir Osman Ali Khan made a huge donation towards re-construction of this temple.
