= Hyderabad Civil Service =

Civil service system in Hyderabad

The Hyderabad Civil Service (HCS), was a modern civil service system in the State of Hyderabad. In 1882, Sir Salar Jung I dismantled the old Mughal administration practices and traditions and created the Hyderabad Civil Services.

The establishment of the Zilabandi system, the creation of Subedari and Taluqdari system, Revenue, Police and Judicial reforms by Salar Jung facilitated the formation of the Hyderabad Civil Service. The new system was based on British administration practices. The legal framework of the Hyderabad State Services was laid by the Rules and regulations codified in 1919.

The Hyderabad Civil Service was a coveted service in the State of Hyderabad and was considered an elite service, and the best of the government officers were inducted into it through a competitive examination. It was abolished after the Police Action in 1948, and its officers were absorbed into the Indian government civil services. The top officers of HCS were accommodated at Hyderabad Civil Service House located near Khairatabad and after a merger in 1950 the building was converted into College of Nursing.
