= Ameen Manzil =

Amin Manzil

General information
- Type: Royal Palace
- Location: Hyderabad
- Demolished: 2018

Amin Manzil was a historic building located in Saidabad, Hyderabad. It was classified as heritage site by Hyderabad Urban Development Authority. There is another locality also by the name Amin Colony. The building was demolished in 2018 in controversial conditions.

This historic structure was named after Nawab Sir Amin Jung Bahadur, Ahmed Hussain, who was a member of the Executive Council of Hyderabad State. He came from Madras in 1895 and was first appointed in Hyderabad as Assistant Secretary in the Nizam's Peshi Office. Later he became Chief Secretary of the Nizam of Saidabad. Love for books distinguished him from the majority of officials in Hyderabad. He raised a good library and housed it in a building which was named Amin Manzil, at Saidabad The building had interesting vault roofs over verandahs and a mixture of Indian & Western styles of architecture.
