= Shah-Ali-Banda =

Shah Ali Banda
- Inner city
- Location in Telangana, India Shah Ali Banda (Telangana) Shah Ali Banda (India)
- Coordinates: 17.35°N 78.47°E
- Country: India
- State: Telangana
- District: Hyderabad
- Metro: Hyderabad

Government
  - Body: GHMC

Languages
  - Official: Telugu
- Time zone: UTC+5:30 (IST)
- PIN: 500 065
- Lok Sabha constituency: Hyderabad Lok Sabha constituency
- Vidhan Sabha constituency: Charminar Assembly constituency
- Planning agency: GHMC

Shah Ali Banda is a neighbourhood in Hyderabad, India. It forms a part of the Old City, Hyderabad in an area located close to Charminar. It is about 2 kilometres (1.2 mi) south of the Charminar. It is also home to famous Princess Esra hospital. Sitara Medical Centre, notable for providing free medical service to the needy is also situated here.

The Shah Ali Banda Clock Tower is located here.

== History ==
Shah Ali Banda: A Historical Overview

Shah Ali Banda, located in the southern part of Hyderabad, was a significant military and administrative hub during the Qutb Shahi period and beyond. This area housed prominent military establishments, particularly those of the Sunni Muslim Paigahs and their Gaur Kayasth serrishtahdars, who managed military and household units. Early Kayasths in the region, including families like the Saksenas and Srivastavas, were primarily military personnel, reflecting the area's martial legacy.

Historically, Shah Ali Banda was bounded by the city walls to the east and south, making it an integral part of the old city's defense and administration. The locality was home to notable establishments, such as those of Raja Rae Rayan and Raja Chandu Lal, who played crucial roles in revenue and administrative functions.

In the eighteenth century, the area served as military quarters, later shifting southward in the nineteenth century as the city expanded. Notably, the Royal Dairy was situated here during the Qutb Shahi rule, and the area remained a center for various production and service enterprises, including tanneries, salt-making pits, and the Hyderabad Mint.

Shah Ali Banda was a melting pot of cultures and economic backgrounds. While grand residences of Hindu and Muslim nobles stood prominently, smaller communities of artisans, traders, and laborers thrived alongside them. The locality was also known for its courtesans, with legends connecting it to figures like Bhagmati, whose story is intertwined with the founding of Hyderabad.

The military influence in Shah Ali Banda was pronounced, with many nobles and commanders associated with its establishments. The area featured a diverse population, including Maharashtrian and Telugu Brahmans, who managed troop units, reflecting the complex social fabric of this historic locality.

== Transport ==
Shah Ali Banda is well connected by buses run by TSRTC due to its proximity to Charminar. The closest MMTS train stations are located at Uppuguda and Yakatpura.

== Metro Station ==
the Hyderabad Metro Rail project has announced plans to include a station at Shah Ali Banda as part of its Phase II expansion into the Old City. The proposed 7.5 km extension will run from the Mahatma Gandhi Bus Station (MGBS) to Falaknuma metro station, featuring stations at Salarjung Museum, Charminar, Shah-Ali-Banda and Falaknuma.
