= Almasguda =

- Municipality
- Location in Telangana, India Almasguda (India)
- Coordinates: 17.311442°N 78.534851°E
- Country: India
- State: Telangana

Languages
  - Official: Telugu
- Time zone: UTC+5:30 (IST)
- Postal code: 500058
- Telephone code: 040
- Vehicle registration: TS-08, TS-07
- Sex ratio: 1:1(approx) ♂/♀
- Website: telangana.gov.in
- This place situated in between Meerpet and Badangapet municipalities.

Almasguda is a municipality in Maheshwaram Mandal,Rangareddy district.It is under Badangpet Municipal Corporation in Telangana India.
