= Nampally Sarai =

Heritage caravanserai at Nampally in Hyderabad, India

Nampally Sarai is a heritage resting place located at Nampally in Hyderabad, India. The 'Nampally Sarai' or 'Tipu Khan Sarai' was built by Nawab Tipu Khan Bahadur under the 6th Nizam, Mir Mahboob Ali Khan, in 1919 in memory of First World War Treaty. The building originally known as Sulah Sarai (a peaceful resting place) was spread on area of 5,828 square yards (4,873 m^{2}) near Nampally. 'It is being neglected by the successive state governments, though my continued efforts for its restoration', says Wajahat Ahmed Khan, great-grandson of Nawab Tipu Khan Bahadur. The location was chosen because of its proximity to the railway station and Carore giri (customs house).

It was also used a state guest house after 1948 by Government of Andhra Pradesh. In 2002, the government contemplated demolishing the structure and building a new one. In 2011, it received heritage site status from the government, because of the efforts of heritage activists and INTACH. The building is poorly maintained and in a dilapidated state. It was handed over to HMR who planned to use the Sarai as an overhead station and link it with Nampally railway station but the plan was put on hold due to protests. Presently GHMC plans to take it back from Hyderabad Metro to build a commercial complex in the same location.

== See also ==
- Heritage structures in Hyderabad
- Shaikpet Sarai
- Tipu Khan Bahadur
