= Greenlands Guest House =

Coordinates: 17.43452°N 78.45584°E

Greenlands Guesthouse
- Interactive map of the Greenlands Guesthouse area

General information
- Location: Begumpet
- Completed: 1927

Greenlands Guesthouse is a government-owned guesthouse located in Greenlands, Begumpet, in Hyderabad. It is a notified heritage structure in Hyderabad. It is used as a state guesthouse. It was built in 1927 as a 'rest house' for the family of Nizams. Since 1952 till 1982 it was used as the official residence of chief ministers of Andhra Pradesh. In 2015 there was a proposal to raze down this building to build a multi-storeyed structure.

== History ==
Greenlands Guesthouse was constructed by the last Nizam's Public Works Department as a seasonal retreat. The building was transferred to the newly formed Andhra Pradesh government in 1952. From 1952 to 1982, it served as the official residence of the chief minister of state, including Marri Chenna Reddy and T. Anjaiah. Later it was changed to being a state guesthouse. In 1998, the Hyderabad Urban Development Authority formally designated it a heritage structure to prevent demolition in favor of high‑rise redevelopment.

== Architecture ==
Greenlands Guest House is a ground-plus-one-storey heritage building situated on a 3.5-acre plot in Begumpet, Hyderabad. The structure contains three ground-floor rooms, a large hall, and a dining room capable of accommodating between 50 and 80 people. The first floor features three fully furnished suites equipped with modern amenities. Designed with functional symmetry, the building includes wide corridors and open verandahs, offering ventilation and a view of its lawns. The site also includes dedicated vehicle parking and is shaded by nearly 15 mature trees, over 60 years old, which contribute to its character as a government guest facility. The Telangana government's renovation plans have included works such as false ceilings, kitchen installations, compound wall enhancements, landscape development, electrical upgrades, and lift repairs, preserving the building's core structural integrity while modernizing its utilities.
