= Saroornagar Lake =

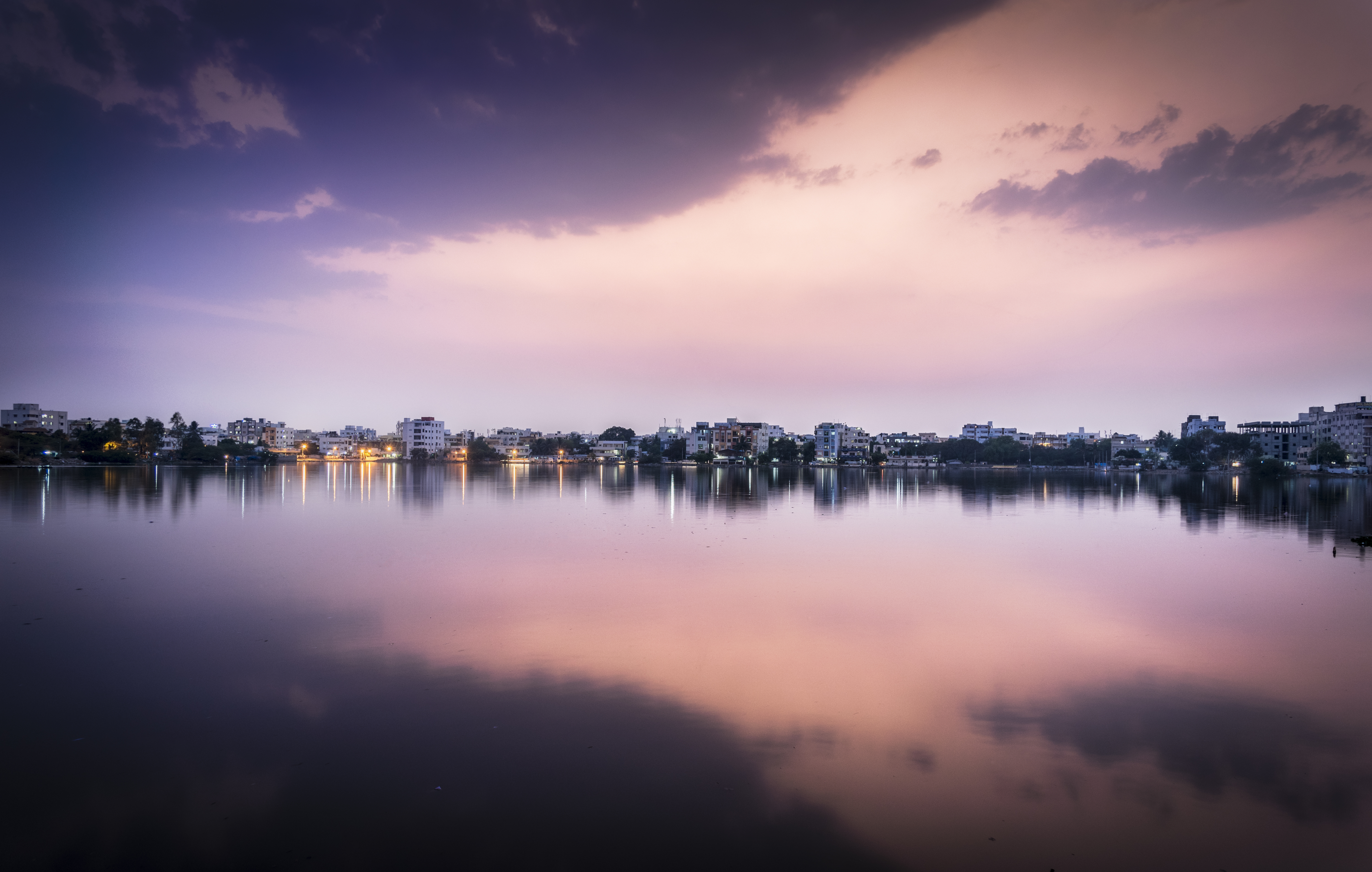

- Location within Telangana
- Location: Hyderabad, Telangana
- Coordinates: 17.35584°N 78.52714°E
- Type: artificial lake
- Basin countries: India
- Surface area: 99 acres (40 ha)
- Max. depth: 6.1 metres (20 ft)
- Settlements: Hyderabad

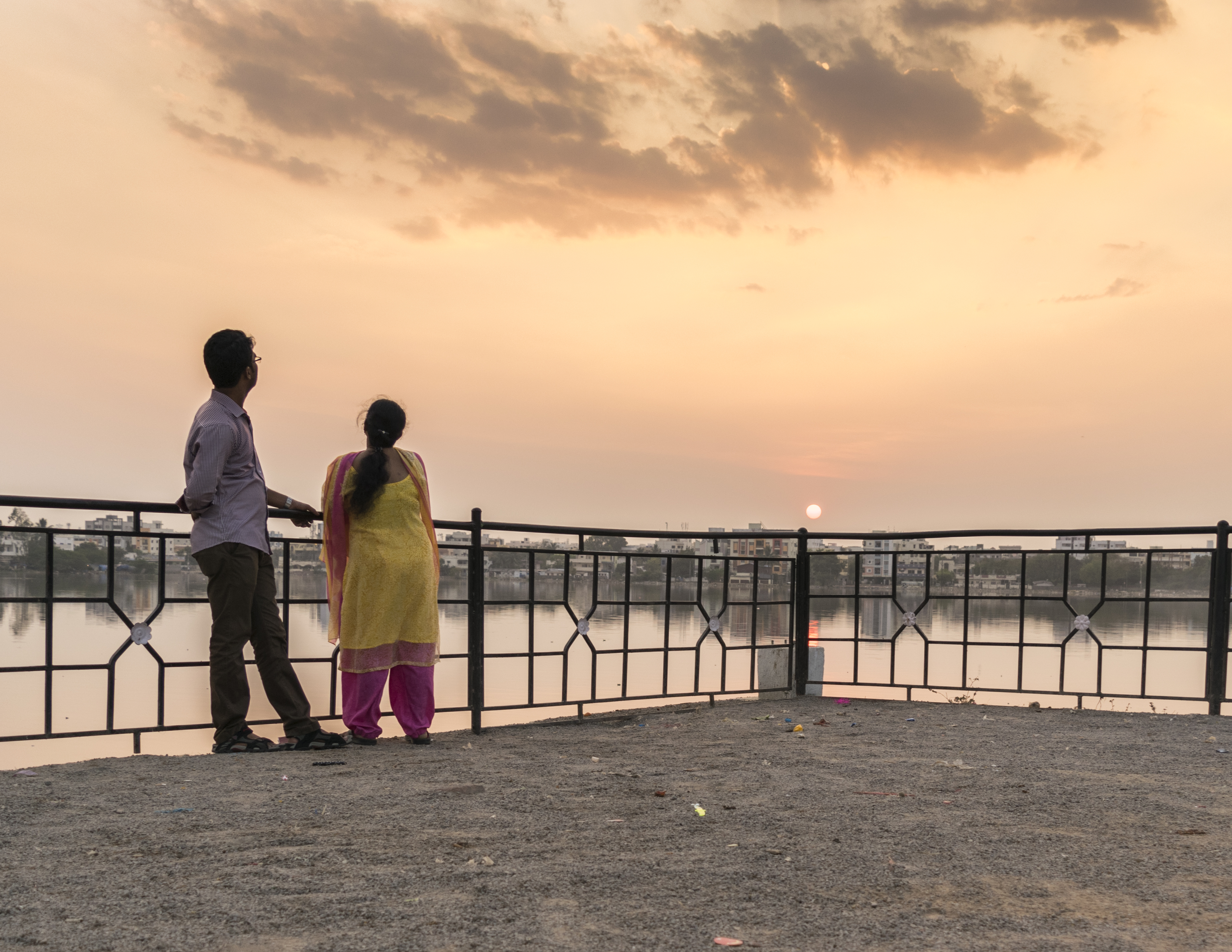
Couple admiring sunset Saroornagar lake

Sunset

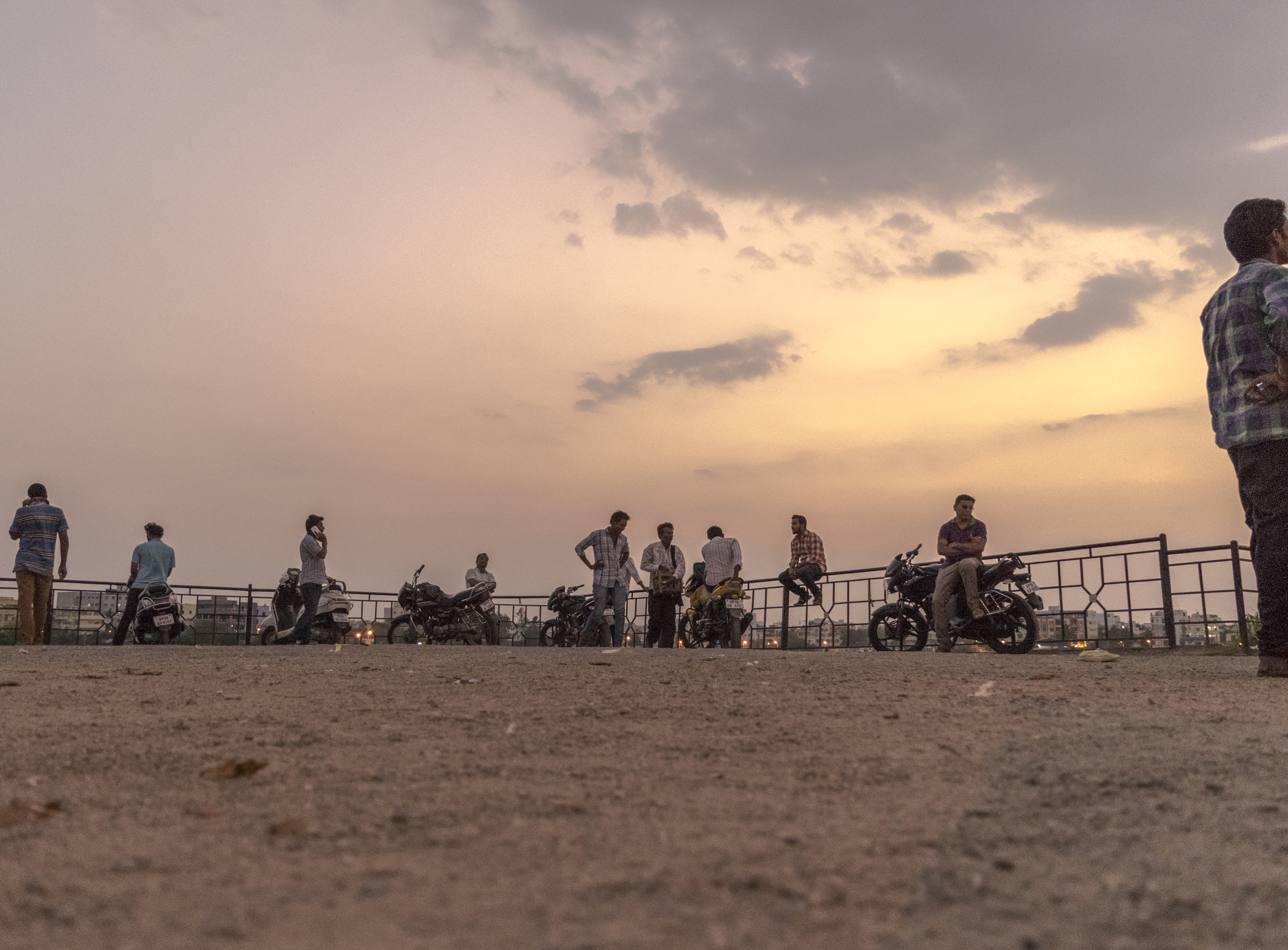
People at saroornagar lake

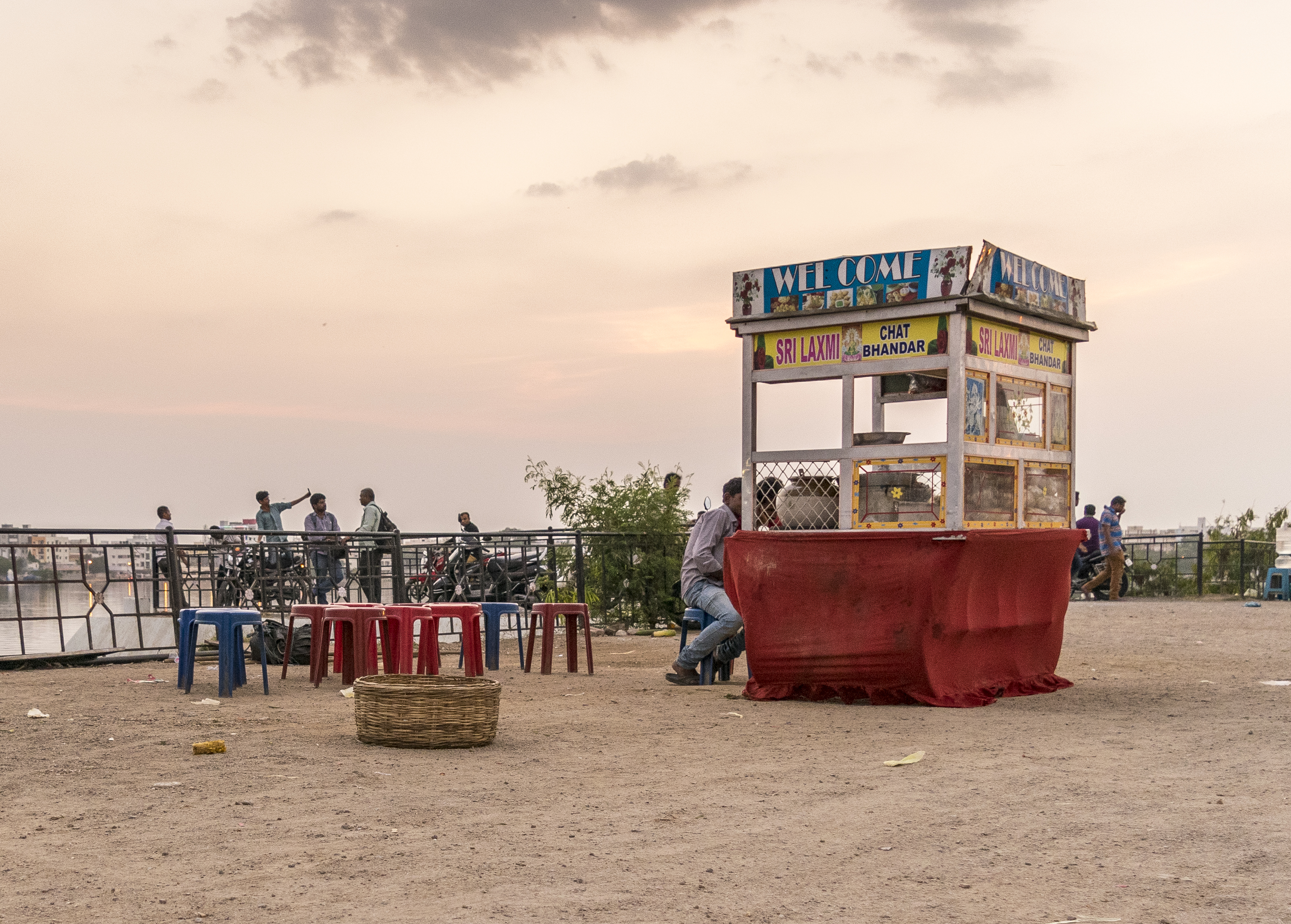
Chat stall at Saroornagar

Saroornagar Lake is a lake in Hyderabad, India. From the year of its creation in 1626, the lake remained largely clean until 1956 when Hyderabad expanded. Spread over 99 acres (40 ha), the lake was restored by the Hyderabad Urban Development Authority in 2003–04 at a cost of ₹200 million (US$2.1 million). After the restoration of the lake, migratory birds returned to the lake in large numbers a few years later.

== History ==
In 1626, the lake was created for agricultural and drinking purposes. Spread over 99 acres (40 ha), the lake has a maximum depth of 6.1 metres (20 ft). It is one of five major water bodies in Hyderabad. After 1956 when Hyderabad became the state capital of the Andhra Pradesh, the city witnessed unprecedented population growth, industrialisation and agriculture using synthetic fertilizers and insecticides. Inevitably, untreated domestic sewage, solid waste and industrial effluents entered into the catchment area of this lake.

In 2003, the Minister of Tourism for Andhra Pradesh announced that the lake and its surroundings would be developed at a cost of ₹200 million (US$2.1 million). As a part of this initiative, two sewage treatment plants with the capacity to treat 250 million litres of sewage a day were to be installed. In addition to this, tourism-centric facilities such as a boating facility in the lake, a children's park and a restaurant were to be taken up. The minister also announced that all construction activity on the lake bed were to be stopped. Soon after, city's civic agency Hyderabad Urban Development Authority took up the task of cleaning up the lake.

Four years after the installation of the sewage treatment plant, the officials reported 95% of sewage being treated. With the groundwater conditions improved, migratory birds returned to the lake in big numbers. In 2007, 5 acres (2.0 ha) park was developed alongside the lake at a cost of ₹15 million (US$160,000). The park featured sculptures, ornamental landscape, boating facility and an environment education centre. Citizens of nearby localities such as L. B. Nagar and Vanasthalipuram welcomed this development. It has last its charm now

After the restoration, the civic agencies have taken necessary measures to prevent pollution from the annual immersion of Ganesh idols. In addition, measures were taken to curb unauthorised construction near the lake bed. However, by 2009, the filtration unit of the sewage treatment plant stopped functioning properly. As a result of this, the lake was getting polluted with domestic waste.
