= Bai Pirojbai Edulji Chenai Parsi Dharamshala =

Bai Pirojbai Edulji Chenai Parsi Dharamshala is a Parsi Dharamshala (communal shelter) which is located at Secunderabad, India. It was established in 1889, the property donated, belonged to Chenai for the use of Zoroastrians coming to Hyderabad. The Dharamshala has a large hall built in 1893, and another small hall built in 1919 known as Jamshed S. Chennai Hall. It also has a pavilion known as Edulji S. Chenai Pavilion built in 1929. It is located on Mahathma Gandhi Road.
