= Dilkusha Guest House =

Government-owned guest house in Hyderabad, Telangana, India

Coordinates: 17.419806°N 78.461627°E

- Interactive map of the Dilkusha Guest House area

General information
- Type: residence
- Location: Hyderabad, India

Dilkusha Guest House is a government-owned guest house located in Hyderabad, Telangana, India. It is located adjacent to Raj Bhavan. It is a notified heritage structure in Hyderabad and is used as a state guest house.

Just like Raj Bhavan, Dilkusha Guest House also used to be the property of the princely state of Hyderabad and was used as the official residence of senior officials of the former princely state. Sir Akbar Hydari, a Prime Minister of Hyderabad State, used Dilkusha Guest House as his official residence, later the building has been serving as Government Guest house for officials.

== History ==
The mansion dates to the late 19th or early 20th century and was the official residence of Sir Akbar Hyderi, Prime Minister of Hyderabad state (1938–1941), under the Nizam’s rule. Following Hyderabad’s integration into India, Dilkusha Guest House was acquired by the state government and repurposed for use by visiting dignitaries and government officials, similar to its neighbor Raj Bhavan. It is listed as a Grade III heritage structure by the Hyderabad Metropolitan Development Authority (HMDA) under reference number 108.

== Architecture ==
Dilkusha exemplifies the Indo-Saracenic style featuring a stone plinth and landscaped lawns. While detailed architectural studies are scarce, public heritage audits note its significance and designate it as "Dilkusha Guest House, Raj Bhavan Road – Existing, 4 storeys, No Access, Public". The mansion is complemented by mature gardens and service buildings that align with its official function.
