= Saroornagar =

- Neighbourhood
- Location in Hyderabad Saroornagar (India)
- Coordinates: 17.3561°N 78.5333°E
- Country: India
- State: Telangana
- City: Hyderabad
- Elevation: 487 m (1,598 ft)

Population (2011)
  - Total: 69,400

Languages
  - Official: Telugu, Urdu
- Time zone: UTC+5:30 (IST)
- PIN: 500 035
- Telephone code: +91 , 040
- Vehicle registration: TG

Saroornagar is a neighbourhood in Hyderabad. It is located in the Rangareddy district of Indian state of Telangana. It is located in Saroornagar mandal of Kandukur revenue division.

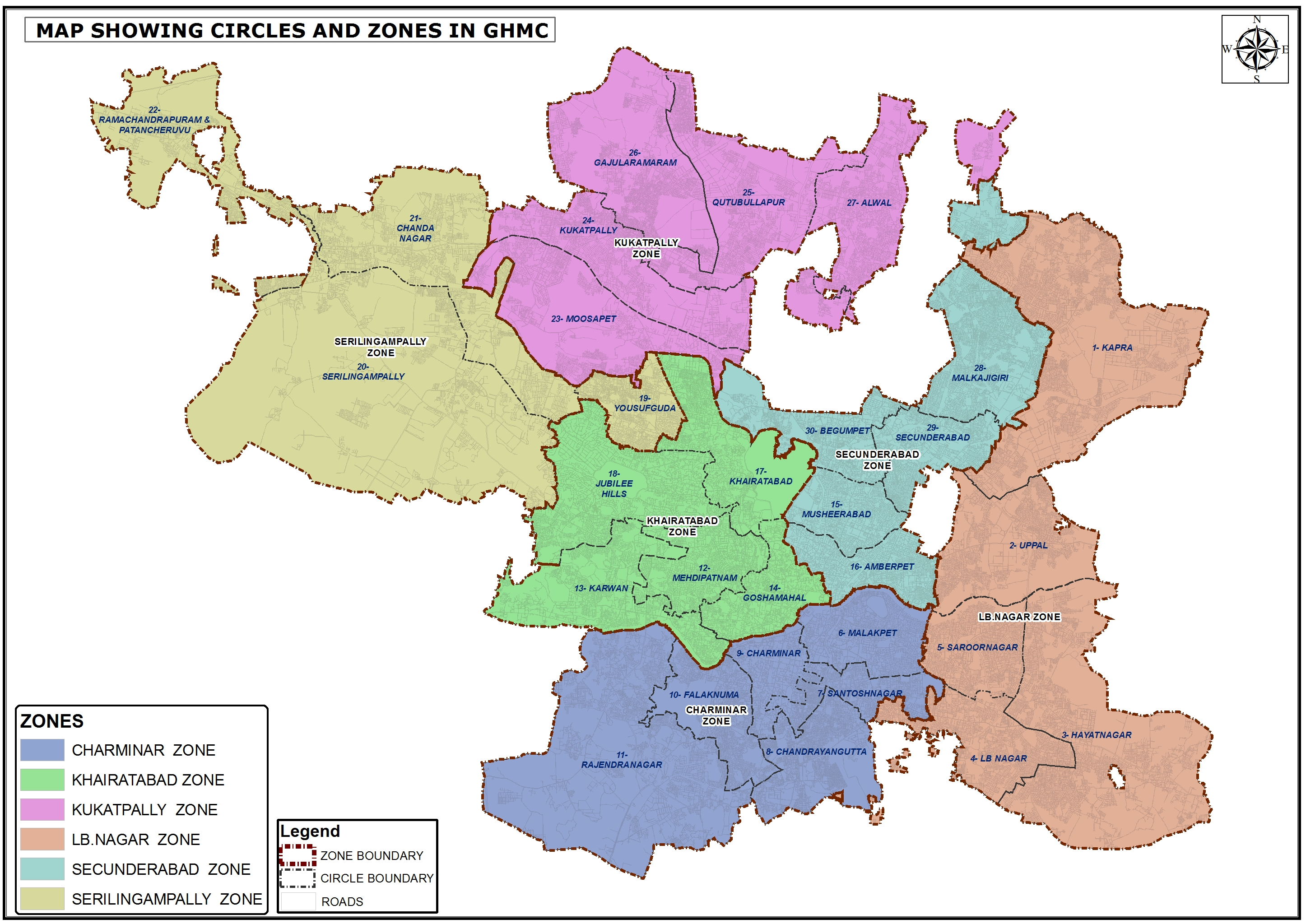
GHMC New Zones, Circles Map of 2019.

This circle (5) comes under L. B. Nagar (East Zone) of Greater Hyderabad Municipal Corporation. There are five wards in this circle namely Saroornagar (19), Rama Krishna Puram (20), Kothapet (21), Chaitanyapuri (22) and Gaddiannaram (23).

== Etymology ==
Saroornagar which was once a calm and wooded locale is named after Saroor Afza Bai, the wife of Mushirul Mulk Bahadur titled Arastu Jah. It is not very clear whether Saroor which meant joy was her real name but Arastu Jah built a palace complex for her.

== History ==
In 1620, then ruler of Golconda, Sultan Muhammad Qutb Shah had decided to move his capital away from Golconda and Hyderabad. He selected a site about 6 miles (9.7 km) east of then Hyderabad, what is today Saroornagar. The fort was named after himself and called as Sultan Nagar Fort. The construction of this fort was abandoned by his wife Hayat Bakshi Begum who considered his sudden death in 1625 as a bad omen. The Saroornagar Lake was built in late 16th century during the Qutb Shahi era to provide water for irrigation of farm lands. This 400-year-old lake is spread across 1 sq. km area.

Asaf Jah II had given away a village beyond Malakpet as inam (gift) to Prime Minister Nawab Arastu Jah Bahadur’s wife Suroor Afza Bai. Arastu built a palace for his wife here and developed a huge garden around it. Since then the village came to be known as Saroornagar.

Saroornagar Palace was built both as a hunting lodge and as a summer resort by Mir Mahbub Ali Khan for himself and his family. The palace came up in 65 acres of land close to the Saroornagar Lake but was considered inauspicious for the Nizam, who then ordered it to be used as an orphanage. On the request of the then British Resident, it was dedicated to the memory of Queen Victoria. It is thus known as Victoria Memorial Home.

== Geography ==
Saroornagar is located at 17.3561°N 78.5333°E. It has an average elevation of 487 meters (1601 ft).

== Notable former residents ==
- Vijay Deverakonda
