= Cherma's =

Major apparel retail store in Hyderabad, India

- Founded: 8 January 1978
- Founder: Capt. Kayarmin Piston
- Headquarters: Abids, Hyderabad
- Number of locations: 7
- Owner: Capt. K. F. Pestonji
- Website: www.chermasindia.com

Cherma's is an apparel store located in Hyderabad, India.

It was started with the brand of shirts and jeans called Cherma's.

Cherma's manufacturing unit is located in Apparel Export Park at Gundlapochampally, near Hyderabad.

== History ==
This retail outlet was started by Kayarmin Pestonji in 1980. Earlier known as Babson's, the first store was opened in Abids. Cherma's offered low cost, ready- to wear garments. One of their popular ads was "you name it! we have it".

The Pestonji family was originally from the seaport town of Tarapore in Thana District and settled in Hyderabad 200 years ago. Pestonji’s father the late Ferozsha Dadabhoy Pestonji was a senior Government Officer in Hyderabad and retired as Director of Industries. He and his wife had two sons and one daughter. The elder son, Dadafrid F Pestonji, after earning his MBA from Andhra University, migrated to Bombay in 1965 and entered the business of exporting garments. Daughter Farida S Wadia is married to Sam F Wadia, who is in the business of manufacturing fire engines and fire fighting equipment at Ahmedabad. K. F. Pestonji, the youngest remained at Hyderabad, married Ms. Gool H Nakra resident of Secunderabad. They have four children – Cherazad, Maniza, Jasmine and Kaizad.

Pestonji started flying at A.P Flying Club in 1967 and earned his Commercial Pilot’s Licence in 1970. He joined AP Flying club in 1972 as a flight instructor.

In 1975 he started manufacturing handloom cloth at primary societies around Hyderabad. He supplied his elder brother D.F. Pestonji with export goods. In 1978 G. K. Pestonji (who had resigned her job with Canara Bank after the birth of their two daughters) started selling surplus export garments for her brother-in-law. The business grew steadily, which led K.F. Pestonji to resign from the State Government and join the business.

=== Kaizad Kayarmin Pestonji ===
Kaizad was born in a family that was already at the centre of retail business in Hyderabad. He developed interest in joining the group and heading its expansion plans. He earned Bachelors in Commerce and Computers and an MBA from the University of Warwick.

He graduated in 2010 and joined the firm.

Kaizad initiated the footwear category. This was a success and accounts for over 10% of turnover. He introduced new brands in the Men's and Children's wear. He is involved in enhancing in-house brands of Cherma’s such as Kaijas, Shamrock, Jasika, Sim One, which are manufactured by a subsidiary – Singh Casuals Pvt, Ltd.

== Stores ==
In Hyderabad, they have branches at Secunderabad, Abids, Kukatpally and Malakpet.

== Personal life ==
Kayarmin Pestonji is a National Seeded Motor Rallyist in both two-wheeler and four-wheeler categories, and bas won National and International events. He won the first Himalayan Rally in 1980 and the 3rd Himalayan Rally in 1982 in the Indian Cars Class.

He is involved with community work and was nominated Trustee in The Old Parsi Fire Temple Trust. He served as President of Dr. Nania Educational Trust, which provides education to poor and needy people.

He is a member of the Local Managing Committee of NIFT.

He served as member of the AP Minorities Commission, Government of Andhra Pradesh from 1991 to 1994 and he was reappointed for the period 1999 to 2002. He is a member of a committee constituted by A P Red Cross Society.

He is a Member of the Direct Taxes Advisory Committee constituted by the Income Tax Department of Andhra Pradesh.

He is the recipient of the "Samman Patra" award for Andhra Pradesh Region for the Financial Year 1997-98 by the Income Tax Department, Government of India on 30 July 2000.

He is also the recipient of a higher award for the second consecutive year and had been honoured with "Rashtriya Sanman" on National Level for the Financial Year 1998-99 by the Income Tax Department, Government of India on 11 March 2002.

He is a recipient of the "Best Management Award" from the Government of Andhra Pradesh on 1 May 2002, for his outstanding contribution in maintenance of Industrial Relations, Labour Welfare and Productivity.
