= College of Nursing, Hyderabad =

Coordinates: 17°25′04.8″N 78°27′38.6″E

College of Nursing is a nursing college located near Raj Bhavan in Hyderabad. It is a notified heritage structure in Hyderabad and was built in Indo-Saracenic architecture. The newly elected Telangana government led by then Chief Minister K Chandrashekar Rao had planned to demolish the structure and build high rises in its place.

Previously it was known as Hyderabad Civil Service House and accommodated the offices for the top civil servants of then Hyderabad State known until 1948 as Hyderabad Civil Service. After its merger with India, in 1950 this building was converted into College of Nursing.
