= Victoria Memorial Home =

Coordinates: 17.36166°N 78.54096°E

Victoria Memorial Home Residential School
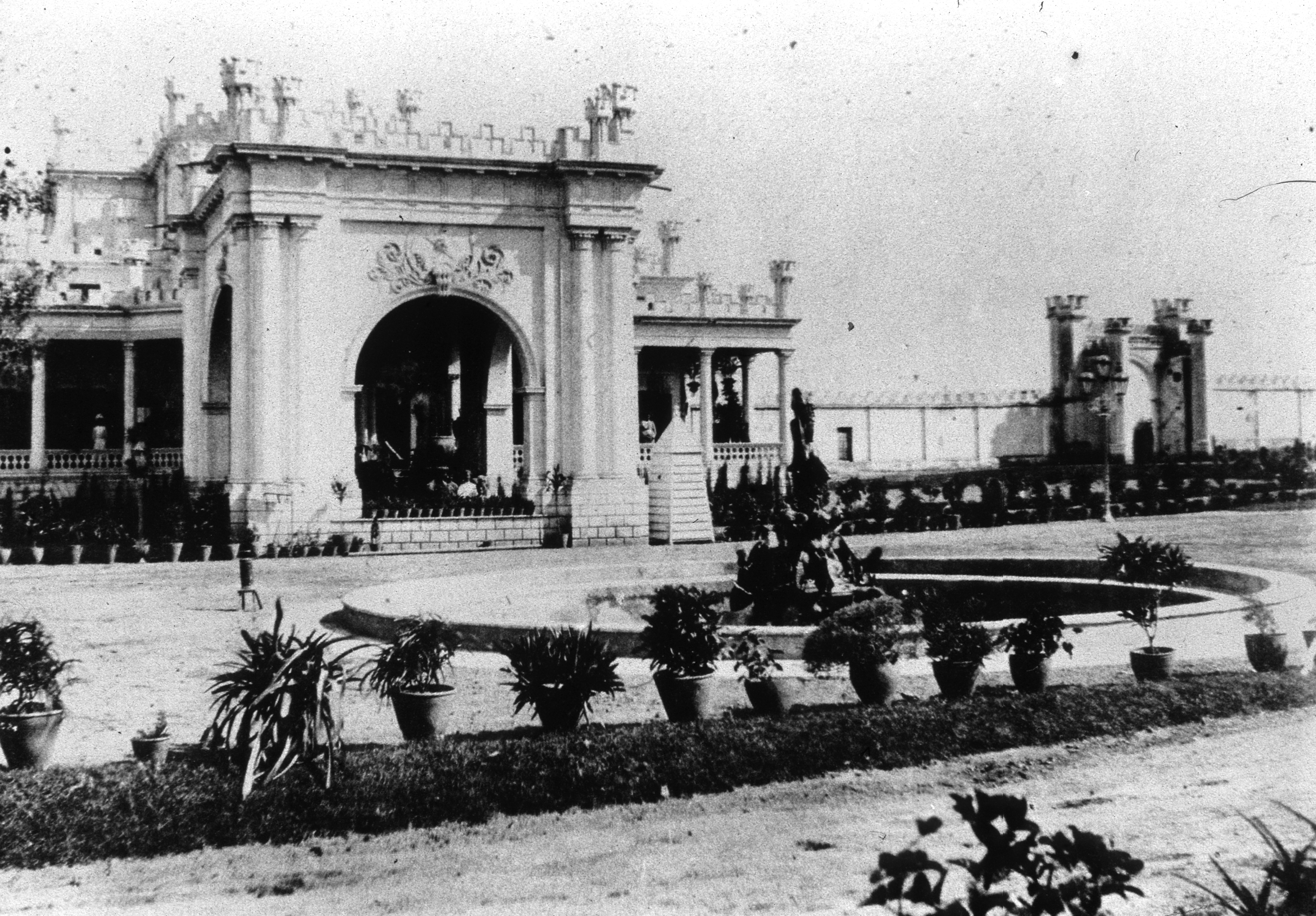
- North view of the Victoria Memorial Home
- Interactive map of the Victoria Memorial Home Residential School area

General information
- Type: Orphanage
- Architectural style: Hyderabad Deccan
- Location: Hyderabad, Telangana, India
- Completed: 1903
- Opened: February 14, 1905; 121 years ago

Height
- Height: 32 feet

Technical details
- Floor count: 2

Victoria Memorial Home Residential School or Yateem Khana-e-Victoria, officially known as Victorial Memorial Home Residential High School is a historic school and orphanage located in Saroornagar in Hyderabad in the Indian state of Telangana.

It is housed in Saroornagar Palace, a palace of the Nizam of Hyderabad. The building is located on a 70-acre campus, located close to the Victoria Memorial metro station.

== History ==
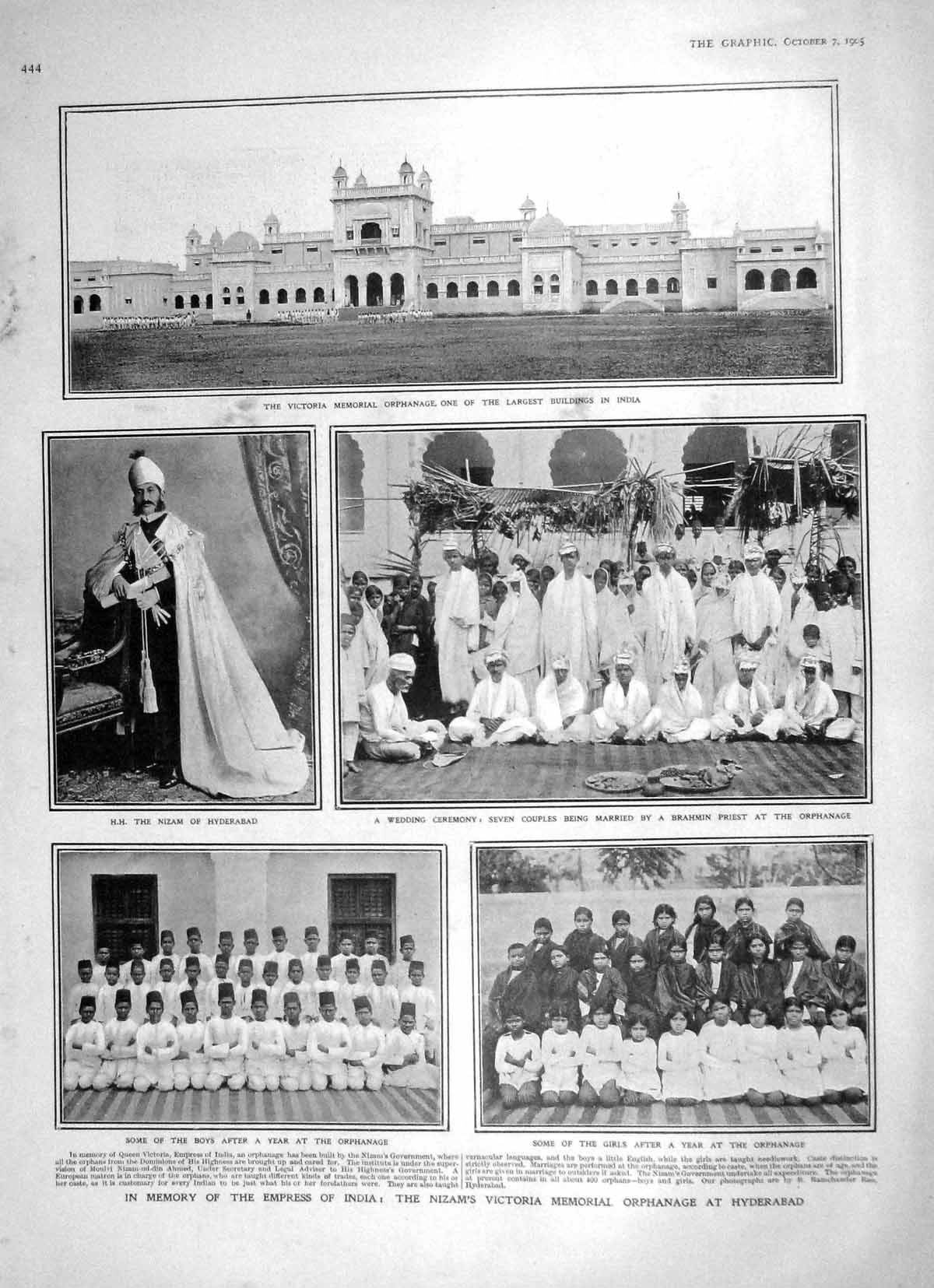
Excerpt from an article about the orphanage that was published in 1905

The Nizam of Hyderabad, Mahboob Ali Khan, had drawings made for a hunting lodge as early as 1882. The building was completed in 1903. However, the Nizam abandoned the palace on account of a superstition, as he fell ill soon after visiting the unfinished palace. The building remained deserted for some time.

In 1904, on occasion of the death of Queen Victoria, the British Resident asked the Nizam to set up an institute in her memory. The latter issued a royal firman to set up the Victoria Memorial Orphanage at the Saroornagar Palace. The orphanage opened officially on 14 February 1905. In 1953, the word "orphanage" was replaced by "home" due to a request by Prime Minister Jawaharlal Nehru.

In 2017, the government announced a plan to hand over a part of the orphanage to house the Rachakonda Police Commissionerate. This resulted in widespread controversy and a case was filed in the High Court against the government. Several activists including Mir Najaf Ali Khan protested against the shift.

== Building ==
The building is rectangular in shape, with a length of 420 feet and breadth of 285 feet. It has two floors. It is surrounded by thick greenery. It has an arched entrance, and high-ceilinged large rooms.
