= Malwala Palace =

Coordinates: 17°21′37″N 78°28′42″E

- Interactive map of the Malwala Palace area

General information
- Type: Royal Palace
- Architectural style: Mughal and Rajasthani Styles
- Location: Hyderabad, telangana, India
- Completed: 1845

Malwala Palace was built in 1845 and is located in Hyderabad, telangana, India. Malwala Palace was located along the road leading towards east from Charminar. It was constructed in Mughal and Rajasthani style and in Hyderabadi courtyard style, was known for its richly carved. wooden pavilion. Other than Raja Bhagwandas Bagh Pavilion, Malwala Palace was the only other palace in Hyderabad having a wooden pavilion. Barring the grand gateway, the entire palace complex has been demolished in August 2000 and a shopping mall has been built in its place.

== History ==
The Malwalas were responsible for the revenue records of the Nizam's dominions. The palace belonged to a noble family of Dewan Chandulal, the Malwala or the custodians of the Revenue Records (Daftar -i- Mal) of the erstwhile Hyderabad State. Built in the early 18th century by the noble Sagar Mall during the reign of first nizam in 1724, this was one of the very few palaces of Hyderabad built in the Mughal and Rajasthani styles of architecture. It acquired the name Malwala as Sagar Mall was the custodian of revenue records (maal) in hyderabad state. At the time department of revenue was held by the Mathur Kayastha family or Malwala family. During the 1940s, at the time of one of the family descendants, Raja Dharam Karan, the grandeur of the palace was resplendent and was noted for its glory and power.

It was an exquisite Diwan Khana made of huge arches in lacquered wood and painted with vegetable dyes and two galleries about 80 m in length flanking the Diwan Khana on each side constructed with Rangoon teak rafters. The galleries housed priceless collection of antique Indian art and artifacts. The palace also had a library, which boasted of a collection of rare books and manuscripts from the 10th century A.D. It is one of the few wooden edifices in the city, a double-storeyed mansion with inner courtyards, with its ornamental archway entrance rich in stucco work and a fountain at the centre. There were wooden pavilions on two sides and overhanging wooden balconies with intricate patterns in Rajasthani and Mughal architectural styles.
