= Lok Bhavan, Hyderabad =

Residence of the Governor of Telangana

Lok Bhavan ,Hyderabad
- రాజ్‌భవన్ ,హైదరాబాదు
- Interactive map of the Lok Bhavan ,Hyderabad area
- Former names: Raj Bhavan

General information
- Coordinates: 17.418935°N 78.460159°E
- Current tenants: Jishnu Dev Varma
- Completed: 1936
- Owner: Government of Telangana

Technical details
- Size: 21.5 acres (8.7 ha)

Design and construction
- Architects: Eric Marrett and Zain Yar Jung

References
- History of Raj Bhavan, Hyderabad (Governor official website)

Lok Bhavan formerly Raj Bhavan (translation: Government House) is the official residence of the governor of Telangana Jishnu Dev Varma located in the city of Hyderabad, India. It is located at Somajiguda adjacent to Hussain Sagar lake.

== History ==
It was designed and constructed in 1936 by Eric Marrett and Zain Yar Jung, during the reign of the last Nizam of Hyderabad Mir Osman Ali Khan. The land area is about 21.50 acres (8.4 hectares).

The Nizam's Government acquired this estate of Nawab Shahzore Jung and Sayyad Akil Bilgrami for the official residence of the Prime Minister of the princely state of Hyderabad. The estate consisted of two older buildings at the place where the present Durbar Hall is located. These were pulled down to make room for the subsequent new structures.

The earliest occupant of the Durbar Hall building was Sir Akbar Hydari, the Prime Minister of Hyderabad State from 1936 to 1941. But he stayed here for a short period and shifted his residence to an adjacent building which is now known as Dilkusha Guest House.

Subsequent Prime Ministers to stay here were the Nawab of Chattari (1941-1946 and May–November 1947), Sir Mirza Ismail (August 1946 to May 1947), Sir Mehdi Yar Jung (November–December 1947) and Mir Laik Ali, President of the Council of Interim Government (1947–48).

== Shah Manzil ==
Shah Manzil, one of the pre-1914 building in Raj bhavan estate, is an architectural landmark and currently used as the office of the Advisors to the Governor of Telangana.
