= Clock Tower, Meerut =

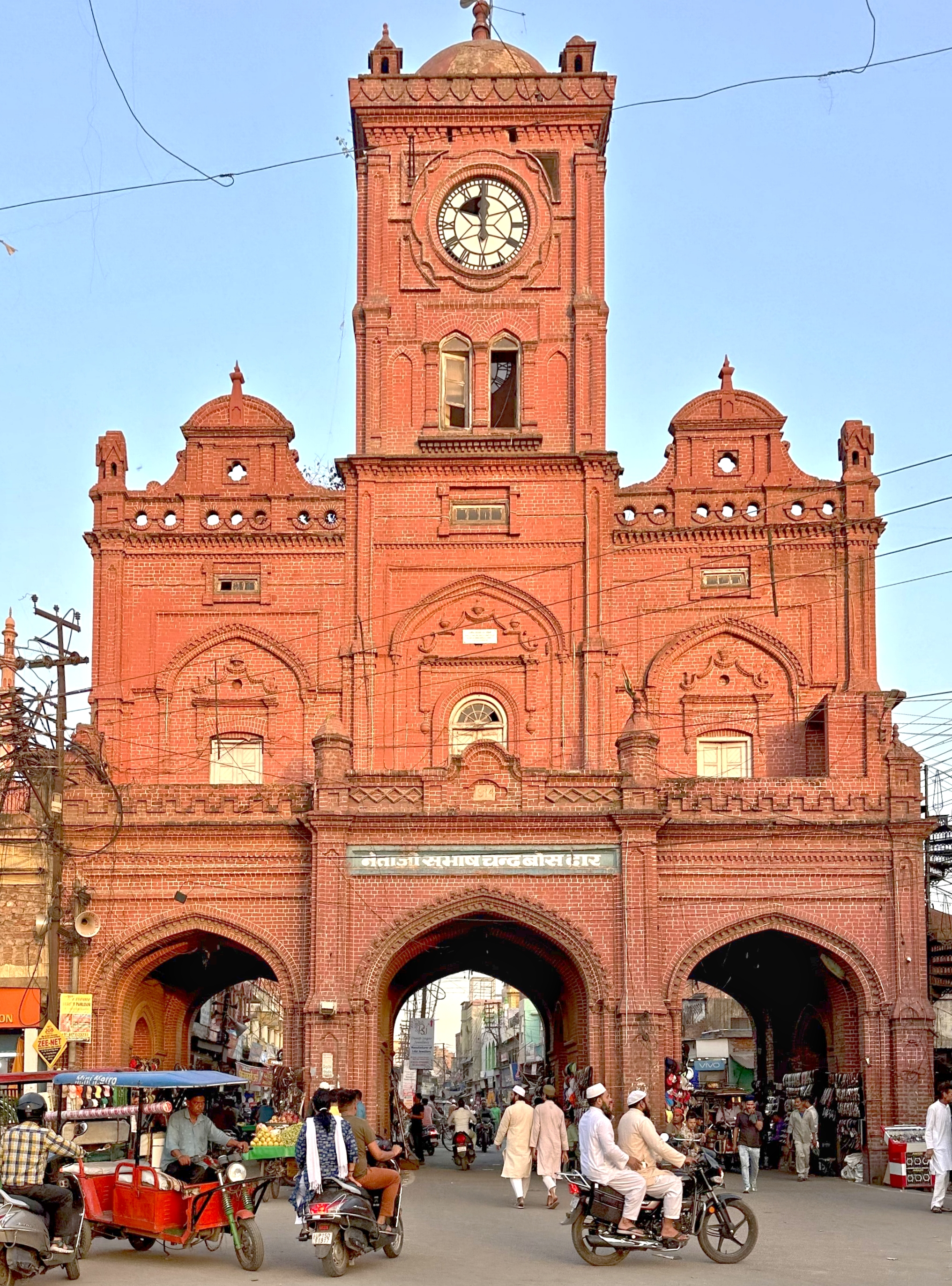
- View from market
- Interactive map of the Clock Tower, Meerut area
- Alternative names: Meerut Ghantaghar, Subhash Chandra Dwar

General information
- Type: Clock tower
- Location: Meerut, India
- Coordinates: 28°58′44″N 77°41′55″E
- Construction started: 1913
- Completed: 1914

Design and construction
- Known for: Landmark of Meerut

The clock tower at Meerut, India, also known as the Meerut Ghantaghar and Subhash Chandra Dwar, is a clock tower completed in 1914. It serves as a gateway between the market and Meerut City railway station.

== Origin ==
The clock tower at Meerut was built on what was a gate named Kamboh Darwaza. (Note: Kamboh gate was built by Abu Muhammad Khán Kamboh.) The conversion was intended to serve as a memorial to King Edward. The foundation stone was laid by district magistrate and collector of Meerut, James Rae Pearson Esquire on 17 March 1913. The clock was previously at the Allahabad High Court after being imported from Germany. It was installed in the tower at Meerut in 1914.

== Design and structure ==
The clock tower is built in brick masonry.

== Location ==
It serves as a gateway between the Valley market and Meerut City railway station. Nearby is the town hall. Two other clock towers in Meerut are located at Budhana Gate, and at St. John's Church.

== Society and culture ==
In the 1930s, the tower served as the location for a meeting held by Subash Chandra Bose. It was subsequently renamed Subhash Chandra Dwar.

In 1990, the brass parts of the clock were stolen.

A replica of the structure constructed in Mumbai, featured in Sharukh Khan's 2018 film Zero.
