= Shrine of Our Lady of Health, Hyderabad =

Coordinates: 17.406971°N 78.456082°E

The Shrine of Our Lady of Our Health, Hyderabad, is the biggest octagonal church in Asia. It is one of the oldest Roman Catholic churches in Hyderabad and is dedicated to the Blessed Virgin Mary. It is situated near Mahaveer Hospital, Masab Tank, Hyderabad, and is in A.C. Guards, Khairtabad. In this church the birthday of the Blessed Virgin Mary is celebrated on 8 September every year. On the day of the feast and during the feast, lakhs of people visit the shrine to pay their respects to the Blessed Virgin Mary. Every year the celebrations start with the Flag Hoisting on 29 August, after which a Novena to Our Lady of Health is held daily in the evenings, when a parish from Hyderabad or Secundrabad comes to host the Holy Mass. After the mass there is a procession with the Statue of Our Lady of Health out in the grounds of the church, after which Benediction takes place. On the first Saturday of every month, a Holy Mass is conducted during which the Statue of Our Lady of Health is taken out in the grounds of the church where Benediction takes place and thousands of people attend the mass.

== History of the Shrine of Our Lady of Health ==
The Saifabad Christian community was under the spiritual care of St. Joseph's Cathedral Church, which had been a mother to many parishes in the Hyderabad area. There was a small Christian community here around the year 1890. In 1898, Capt. Fallon, the then O.C. of the 3rd Infantry of the Nizam army, permitted the construction of a chapel (vide Lt. No. A/17-7-/43F/182. of Lieut. Col. Of 3rd Bn., Hyderabad. Infantry, dt. 20 Sept. 1938) to serve the personnel of the A.C. Guards. In 1903, 'the 3rd Infantry returned from Sholapur and was quartered here permanently' (vide letter of Mr. Caesar, Retired Troop Officer, Aug. 1920), and the Catholic Christian community grew. Fr. Malberti, the then parish priest of St. Joseph's Cathedral, mooted the idea of building a chapel in 1902 to cater to the needs of the Catholic soldiers of the A.C. Guards and the 3rd Bn. of the Infantry and their families.

The construction of the chapel started in May 1903, and it was completed by the end of December of the same year. It was, however, consecrated by Bishop Vigano on 10 January 1904 to commemorate the Golden Jubilee of the declaration of the Dogma of the Immaculate Conception. The chapel was originally known as the Church of Our Lady of Divine Grace. A sum of Rs. 1028 and 13 Annas was the contribution received from different people (including Rs. 5/- from Bishop Vignao and Rs. 5/- from Fr. Vimara, who later succeeded Bishop Vigano as Bishop of Hyderabad) towards the construction of the chapel, although the actual cost of the construction was Rs. 3,500.00, according to Fr. Passoni, the 1st parish priest of Our Lady of Health Church (Ref. His letter dt. 11 June 1938 to the executive engineer). The Vestry, attached to the church, was built later by late Fr. Cantaluppi during Fr. Pagani's tenure as parish priest of St. Joseph Cathedral. Mass was offered in this chapel only on Sundays.

The Annual Feast of "Our Lady of Health has been celebrated since 1904 with 'much grandeur'. It was during that time 'dumb box' collection was introduced by Mr. Caesar, Retired Troop Officer (Treasurer) and the 1st collection was Rs. 50.00. 'Fr. Malberti' was quite surprised at such a collection as he did not know what a 'dumb box' was'. Fr. Pagani became the Parish Priest of St. Joseph's Cathedral after Fr. Malberti.

In a letter written on 12-10-1938 to the Commanding Officer of the H.E.H., the Nizam's A.B.G.S., Fr. Magri, the then Parish Priest of St. Joseph's Cathedral, said that Fr. Pagani started, in 1912 a school 'for the Christian education of children unable to attend a Catholic School'. It was run in the Chapel till 1938. We do not know what happened to that school, as there is no mention of it later.

'In 1936, Fr. Passoni, an Italian priest who had to come to Hyderabad from China as the climate did not suit him, was asked to be in charge of Saifabad. In 1938 a residential quarter was built for him and he came to stay at Saifabad and looked after the needs of the community. In 1939, Fr. Passoni was interned during the war out of Hyderabad. In 1944 he was released and he came back to Saifabad but due to certain difficulties with Hyderabad Army, he was transferred towards the end of 1947. Fr. Xavier Roch, who for some time the Vice Principal of All Saints High School and Asst. Parish Priest at St. Joseph’s Cathedral was asked to take charge of Saifabad Parish as its second Parish Priest. He remained Parish Priest of this place for 27 years till his untimely death on 14 August 1974.

There is a little with regard to when the 'New Parish of Our Lady of Health' was started and who the 1st Parish Priest was. Fr. Xavier Roch, in History of Khairtabad Parish, Said that "Fr. Passoni was appointed Parish Priest in 1939 and the Parish returned to the custody of the Cathedral during an internship during the world war. But there is an official letter of erection of the ‘ New Parish of Our Lady of Health' signed by the then bishop of Hyderabad Rt. Rev. Vismara, dated 24 September 1941.

Quote the letter of Bishop Vismara: "The New Parish of Our Lady of Health, Saifabad which has been separated from the Cathedral Parish of St. Joseph, Hyderabad and erected a New and independent on the 24th Sept 1941 has the following boundaries : 1. The Railway Line from Itenagar to Shankarapalli forms the Northern boundary. 2. The line drawn straight from Shankarpalli to Osmansagar forms the Western boundary. 3. The River Musi from Osmansagar to Muslim Jung forms the Southern boundary. 4. On the Eastern side, the new parish is separated from the Cathedral Parish of Hyderabad by the following Roads : Begum Bazar Road – Shah Inayat Gunj Road – Dargha Road – Custom’s Office – Broadguage Railway. Station – Road Crossing the Public Garden from the Western Gate to the Main gate – Mint Road – Hussain Sagar". The area of the new Parish was vast indeed. The Parish of Our Lady of Health has been a parent to many parishes after 1972.

(1) st. Anthony's Church, Bazarghat
(2) St. Theresa's, Sanathnagar
(3) St. Ignatius, Gagllapuram
(4) Immaculate Heart of Mary Church, Basuregadi
(5) St. Agnes Church, Shapurnagar
(6) Immaculate Conception Church, Kukatpally
(7) St. Michael's Church, Salar Jung Colony
(8) St. Don Bosco Church, Himayat Sagar and
(9) St. Alphonsus Church, Banjara Hills were all once part of Our Lady of Health Parish.

"Saifabad was not new to Fr. Xavier Roch nor the people here, as he had been coming regularly from St. Joseph’s Cathedral to visit and celebrate Mass on Sundays. He soon found them responding to his activities". A school and a dispensary were started for the poor of the parish. In 1948, the Rev. Sisters of Charity were invited to look after the school and the dispensary. They have now grown into big institutions: Holy Mary High School and Vijay Marie Hospital.

In 1950, as the then existing church was found too small for the congregation, a grotto was built, after obtaining due permission, where Sunday and Feast Masses were offered.

In 1951, Fr. Roch asked for and obtained allotment of two plots of land from Govt, 1 (in front of the present church) measuring 3413.33 Sq. yards (vide Chief Secretary's letter No. 177/GAD-G/202/51 dated 11 May 1951 and the other plot of land (where Vijay Marie Hospital now stands) measuring 2971.44 Sq. yards of Army Land, allotted to the church authorities (Vide letter No. 2731/129-L-51A, dated 12 April 1952) as the church activities, including school and the dispensary needed more space.

In 1951, a hospital with 20 beds was built and was called 'Vijay Marie Hospital'. The Doctor in-charge was Dr. I. De’Souza, later known as Dr. Mrs. Rebello. The hospital was handed over to the Sisters of Charity. Since then additions to the building have sprung up and now is a hospital of 200 beds. (Vide Fr. Roch's History of Khairtabad Parish). Holy Mary School was handed over and shifted to the present spacious premises after being under the 'Trees' in the church premises for some time.

In 1954, foundation stone was laid by late His Exalted Highness, the Nizam of Hyderabad, Mir Osman Ali Khan Fateh Jung, to a novel Octagonal Church on 27 December 1954. It took five years to complete and it was inaugurated by the same Nizam and blessed by the then Archbishop of Hyderabad, Most Rev. Mark Gopu, in the presence of five other bishops, on 15 September 1959. Fund for the construction came from the poor and the savings of the feast. The total cost came to around Rs. 1,50,000.00.

About the same time, Sanathnagar, the industrial area needed help too. The Catholics there were scattered in and near the industrial area. Mass for those who could attend was offered in one of Allwyn Officer's houses. In the meantime, J.M.J Sisters from Guntur were looking for a place in the city for the extension of their medical services and 12 acres of land was bought by them and their provincial was good enough to give permission to build a Church in their land, close to the main road. In two years time it was completed and blessed on 5 February 1968 by Archbishop Most. Rev. Mark Gopu of Happy Memory. The total cost of the construction of the church was about Rs. 1,75,000.00. In 1973, Sanathnagar became a Parish, separated from Our Lady of Health Church, Khairatabad.

There was an old tiled roof chapel, at Bazarghat, which was built on a plot of land measuring 800 yards^{2} given by the H.E.H. Nizam's army to build a Church for the Catholic men and their families serving 2nd Infantry of Nizam's Army. This Church was marked in the Municipal Survey of 1913. We do not know who built it and when. Municipal Land Tax exemption was given in 1962.

This old church was in a dilapidated condition. It had to be rebuilt. In 1971, rebuilding work was undertaken and on 13 June 1973, the church was blessed and inaugurated by Archbishop S Arulappa. The cost of the chapel was about Rs. 25,000.00. About this time, there was need for a parish hall; a 1st floor building was erected at the cost of Rs. 45,000.00 The pilgrims shed costing Rs. 25,000.00 was also put up in the church premises. All funds came from the church collection.

Fr. Roch, in his 'History of Khairtabad Parish', says in the concluding paragraph "Now with an energetic and active young priest, Fr. Y M Joseph, this year 1974, a Vijay Marie School, in the parish hall, has been started with only one class, the 4th standard, about 50 students are attending. He is now hard at work organizing the youth movement in the parish".

Fr. Roch was not only a builder of buildings, but a builder of people and communities. He was constantly on his feet visiting people. It was when he was returning after such a family visitation, that he met with an accident at about 9.30 P.M. on 12 August 1974. He died on 14 August at 2.30 P.M. in Osmania Hospital.

Now to continue with the rest of the history of the parish: Holy Mary School entertained boys only up to Class III and they were asked to find admission elsewhere for further studies. Girls in the parish had better opportunities than boys. Most of the boys dropped out of the school as 'they could not get admission in Catholic Schools in Gunfoundry area'. In 1974, the then Asst. Parish Priest Fr. Y. M. Joseph was asked by the parents of four students to approach the Catholic schools in Gunfoundry for admission of their children who completed class III in Holy Mary. As admission was refused to them on various grounds, he asked the Parish Priest, Fr. Roch permission to start a school in the parish, Fr. Roch, encouraged him to start 'Vijay Marie School' as it was called and commenced on 13 June 1974 with 53 students in class IV. Later it was renamed Fr. Roch Memorial School during the meeting called to condole the death of Fr. Roch.

Khairtabad Church has been since 1904, a Sacred Shrine of Our Lady of Health. The number of people visiting this Shrine increased. Attempts were made to build a parish hall and to create facilities to receive the pilgrims. One serious attempt was made in 1980, when Fr. Benny was Parish Priest. Foundation for the parish hall was laid by the then Archbishop Most. Rev. S Arullapa. But it just remained a dream. The construction project did not take off.

In 1997, the Parish Pastoral Council members reminded the new Parish Priest Fr. Y M Joseph about the construction of a parish hall and the pilgrim center. The then Archbishop promised to support the project with financial help of 40% of the total cost. Though the financial help was not given, the construction was undertaken with the savings of the Shrine, the generous contribution of the people and a loan from HASSS, which will be paid back in due course of time. The construction of the 'Parish Pilgrim Center' was completed at the cost of Rs. 56,00,000.00.
