= Ghadi Chowk, Raipur =

Clock tower located in the Raipur, India

Raipur Clock Tower
- घड़ी चौक रायपुर
- Interactive map of Raipur Clock Tower
- Location: Raipur, Chhattisgarh
- Coordinates: 21°14′41″N 81°38′34″E
- Type: Memorial
- Material: Brick and white cement
- Opening date: 19 December 1995
- Dedicated to: Guru Ghasidas

Ghadi Chowk Raipur also known as "Guru Ghasidas Time Square" is a clock tower located in the heart of Raipur, Chhattisgarh, India. Constructed in 1995, the structure was inaugurated on 19 December 1995. This place is considered an important landmark in Raipur and has become an iconic symbol of the city. A six-foot diameter mechanical clock was installed around its pillar, about 50 feet high, made of concrete. Every hour, the bell in its turret used to ring. To popularize the folk tunes of Chhattisgarh, the Raipur Development Authority decided to play the folk tunes of Chhattisgarh before the hourly bell in the Nagarghari, so that the common man can also become familiar with the folk tunes of Chhattisgarh.
