= Mahatma Gandhi Road (Secunderabad) =

Road in Secunderabad, India

- MG Road

- Location within Hyderabad Location within Telangana Location within India
- Former name: James Street
- Namesake: Mahatma Gandhi
- Maintained by: Greater Hyderabad Municipal Corporation, Hyderabad Metropolitan Development Authority
- Length: 1.21
- Location: Ranigunj
- Postal code: 500003
- Coordinates: 17.4387°N 78.4886°E
- Major junctions: Ranigunj; Kalasiguda; Ramgopalpet
- South end: Tadbund

Other
- Known for: Ramgopalpet Police Station

MG Road or Mahatma Gandhi Road formerly known as James Street is a road in Secunderabad, Hyderabad, India.

It leads to a warren of streets called Tobacco Bazaar and Pot Market. Major landmarks include Paradise Hotel, Kabra Jewellers, Gandhi Statue, Chermas, Asrani Hotel, Paradise X roads, KFC, Ramgopalpet Police Station and Malani Building.

== History ==
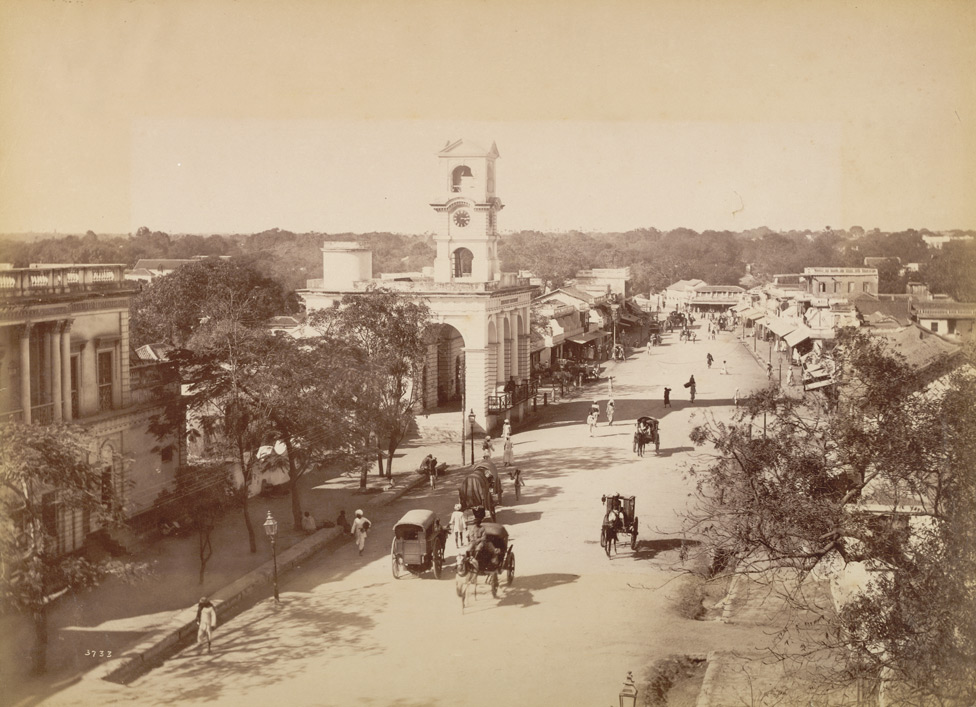
James street circa 1880

This road was named James Street after the Resident James Achilles Kirkpatrick. Later after independence, the street was renamed as Mahatma Gandhi Road.

== Commercial area ==
MG Road is one of the foremost shopping areas in Secunderabad. The General Bazaar and Cloth Market off this road are familiar haunts for shoppers and bargain hunters.

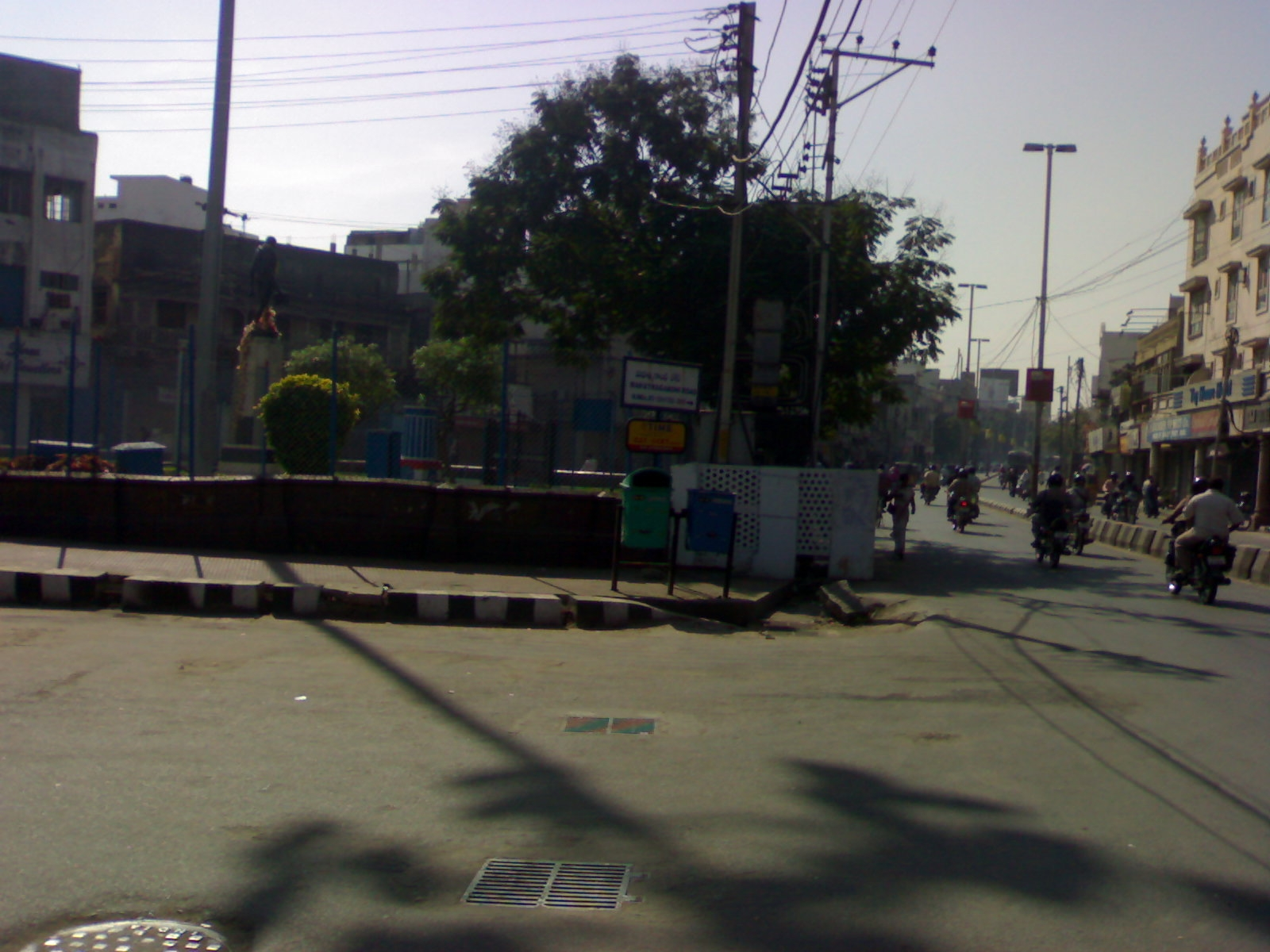
MG Road Circle - Gandhi Statue

MG Road is home to numerous global brands. Leading brands have their showrooms located here. Some of these establishments are:

Cherma's: One of Secunderabad's oldest apparel retail stores.
Honda Cars: Sundaram Motors - This is Honda's largest Honda car dealership in Secunderabad.
Philips Light Lounge and Philips Light Studio: Ved Electricals (Ved Group) - This is Philips' largest Philips Light Lounge and Philips Light Studio in Telangana.
Theatres: There used to be many theatres on MG Road like Alankar, Chitrani, and Paradise etc. later these turned into shopping malls and restaurant, Famous Paradise restaurant is one of them, which used to be connected hotel to Paradise theatre.

=== General Bazaar ===
Gold Market The area is famous for gold and jewellery shops where one can buy traditional handmade jewellery. Gold market is flourishing here since 150 years.

The area is studded with Zari/Kanchi Saree shops and Wedding related shops. The area has also big shopping names like Bomanna, Chandana Bros, etc.

There is an offshoot road towards the west which takes to the Begumpet Airport, and the road is the place where Sir Ronald Ross is said to have discovered the cause of malaria.

== Transport ==
The nearest MMTS train station is James Street.

MG Road is well connected by the state-owned TSRTC buses to all parts of the city. There are plenty of buses since it lies between Ranigunj bus depot and Secunderabad station.

== Landmarks ==
Major landmarks include Gandhi Statue, Chermas, Asrani Hotel, Paradise X roads, KFC, Ramgopalpet Police Station and Malani Building. Parsi Fire Temple is also situated along this road.

== Police Station ==
The M.G. Road in Secunderabad was earlier known as James Street. The Police Station was designed by Dewan Bahadur Ramgopal Malani who donated it to the Police Department for its use. According to an Andhra Pradesh government order dated 23 March 1998 the clock and the police station building were designated as heritage buildings.

== See also ==
- Tourist attractions in Hyderabad
- M G Road, Bangalore
- Brigade Road
