= Monda Market =

- Aerial view of Monda market

- Location within Hyderabad Location within India

General information
- Architectural style: Art Deco
- Location: Secunderabad, India
- Coordinates: 17°26′3″N 78°29′48″E
- Completed: 1868
- Owner: GHMC

Monda Market is a vegetable market located at Secunderabad. It is said to have been established in 1870s to cater to resident British army units. The market is located approximately at 500 m (0.31 mi) from Secunderabad Railway Station.

It was one of the largest wholesale and retail markets in Hyderabad. Officially about 375 traders have business in the Monda Market. GHMC has stated that due to poor conditions and inadequate facilities, the existing structure is to be demolished and a new multi-storied complex was to be constructed in its place. In 1998, the wholesale vegetable business was shifted to Bowenpally about 6 km (3.7 mi) from Secunderabad. The proposal to shift the retail market was dropped after traders opposed the move.

== Architecture ==
The Monda Market is designed in the art deco style, with a clock tower overlooking the market. The old jail complex also known as Jail Khana which was built in 1826 and was used to lodge political prisoners during the pre-Independence era by Britishers is located adjacent to the market. The jail built using granite and limestone was declared as a heritage structure in 2006. In 1956 after formation of Andhra Pradesh, the jail was converted into a commercial structure and was handed over to local administration
