= Sultan Nagar Fort =

17th-century fort in Hyderabad, India

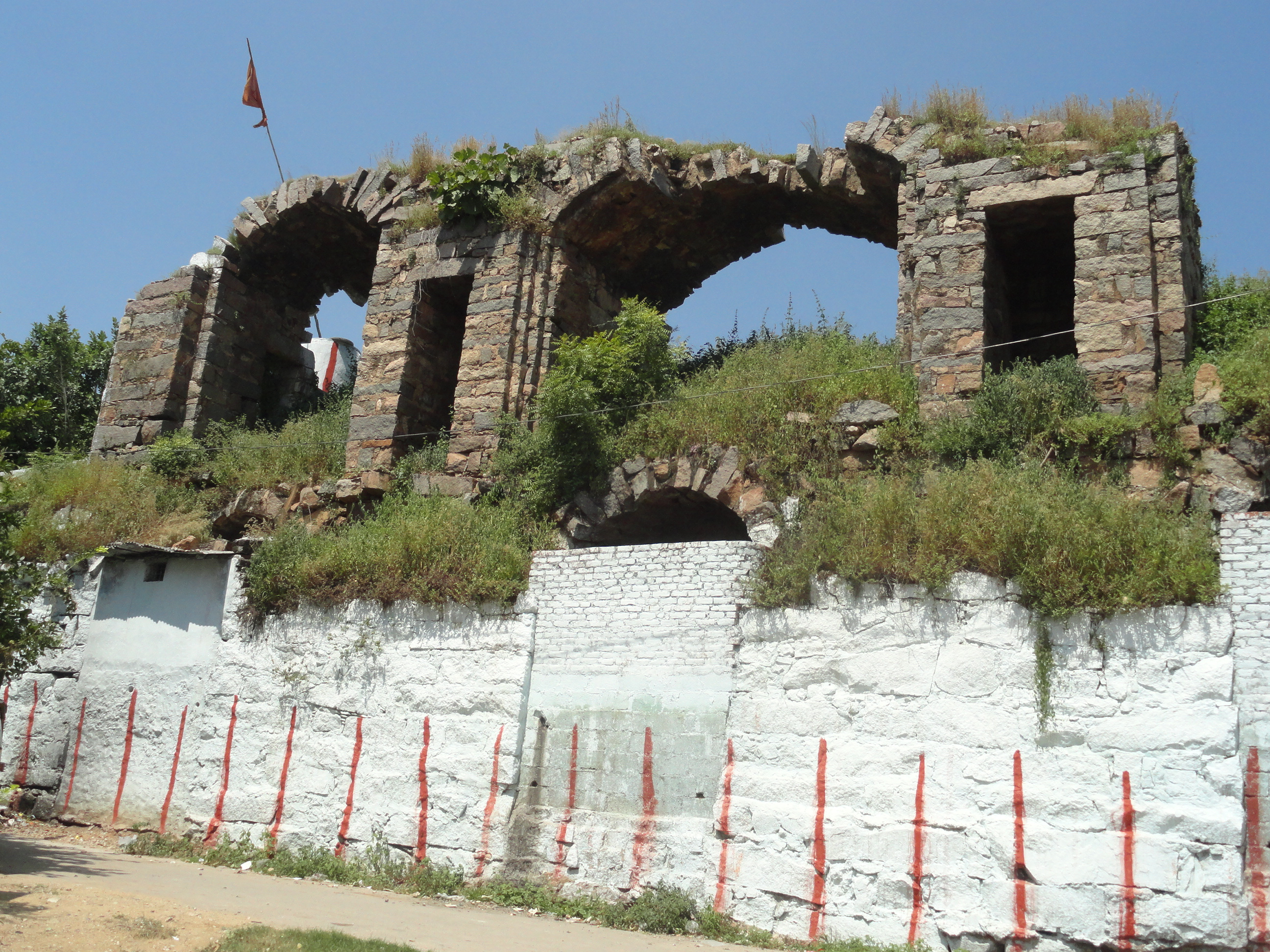
- Sultan Nagar Fort

- Location within Hyderabad Sultan Nagar Fort (Telangana) Sultan Nagar Fort (India)

General information
- Location: India
- Coordinates: 17.358923315843626°N 78.54713457117542°E
- Construction started: 1620

Sultan Nagar Fort, also known as Qila-yi Kohna (the Old Fort), are the ruined remains of an abandoned Qutb Shah era fort whose construction had started around 1620. The fort is located at a place now known as L. B. Nagar in Hyderabad, India.

== History ==
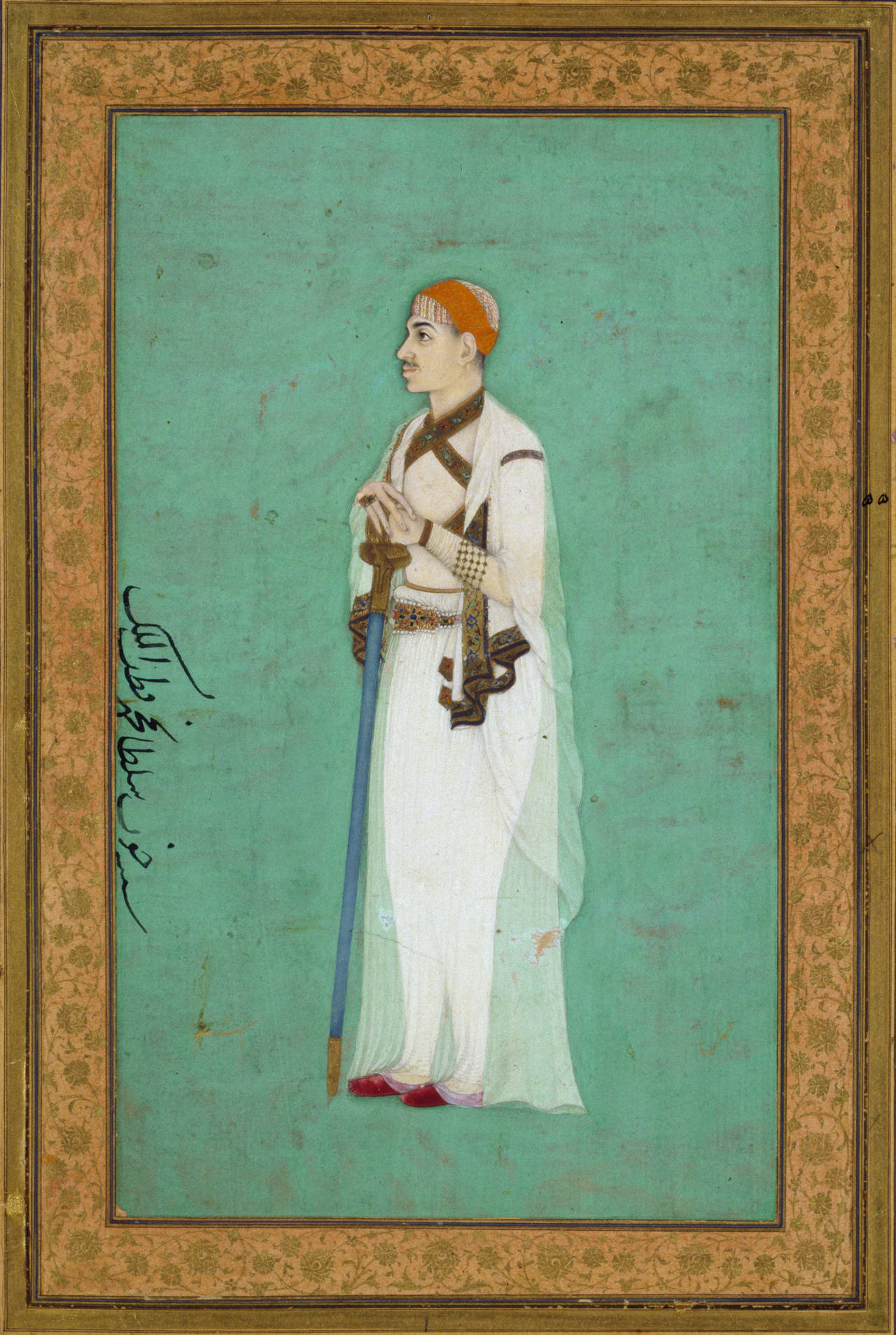
Portrait of Sultan Muhammad Qutb Shah

Sultan Muhammad Qutb Shah, who had ascended the throne in 1611, wanted to shift the location of his palace and fort far away from Golconda and then Hyderabad which was centred around Charminar, and he started building a new fortress. It is also believed that probably he had intended to shift his capital. The area selected was at Saroornagar which was about 6 miles (9.7 km) east of then Hyderabad. By 1620 work was in full swing for the new fortress which the king named after himself as Sultan Nagar. The king spend about 3 lakh gold coins on constructing the new fort which was surrounded by a supposedly 75 feet (23 m) deep and 150 feet (46 m) wide moat. Sultan Muhammad Quli died suddenly in 1625 leaving behind his wife Hayat Bakshi Begum who was still very young and a toddler Abdullah Qutb Shah who would later become the seventh ruler of Golconda. Hayat Bakshi felt that the sudden death of the king at an age of around 32 years was an ill omen and decided to abandon the construction of the new fort. By then the moat and the masjid were ready and the fortress was nearing completion. Later a new settlement known as Hayathnagar which was named after the Begum was established further to the east.

== Present ==
The ruins of the fort which once occupied an area of around 5,000 acres (20 km^{2}) is now also known by some as Maisamma fort. In addition to the mosque built by the Sultan, a temple dedicated to Goddess Maisamma was also later built inside the abandoned fort's premises.
