= Shah Ali Banda Clock Tower =

- Location: Hyderabad, India
- Built: 1904

The Shah Ali Banda clock tower is a clock tower located in Hyderabad, India.

== History ==
It was constructed in 1904, as part of Raja Rai Rayan's palace. The palace has been destroyed, but the clock tower remains.

The clock is being restored in 2020.

== Clock ==
The clock contains Hindu-Arabic, Roman, Hindi, and Telugu numerals.

== See also ==
- List of clock towers
