= Ramgopalpet Police Station =

- Interactive map of the Ramgopalpet Police Station area

General information
- Location: Secunderabad, Hyderabad, Telangana, India
- Coordinates: 17.43637°N 78.48849°E

Ramgopalpet Police Station, also known as the James Street Police Station, is located on the MG Road, Secunderabad (earlier known as James Street) in Secunderabad.

It falls under the central zone of the Hyderabad City Police. The Hussain Sagar lake police also comes under the jurisdiction of this police station.

== History ==
The clock was donated in 1900 to the then James Street Police Station by Dewan Bahadur Seth Ramgopal. The Ramgopalpet Police Station building was designated as a heritage building by Andhra Pradesh government order dated 23 March 1998. In 2016 municipal authorities asked all personnel working in the structure to vacate after the building was deemed unsafe and scheduled for demolition.

In 2024-2025 the demolition order was overturned and restoration work was led by HDMA and Deccan Terrain Heritage on the James Street Police Station and was carried out by Mir Khan from the Deccan Terrain Heritage team. Mir Khan was also the lead for restoration of the 16th century Gulzar Houz fountain near the Charminar two-three years ago. The restoration and conservation involved the removal of deteriorated lime plaster, plastering of weak walls, replacement of damaged wood, and repairs to wooden barracks, as well as restoration of the clock structure and roof. The brass bell, which was brought to the ground floor due to its heavy weight, has been placed in a display case. According to Ramgopalpet inspector Narsingh Rao, as the property belongs to the police department, it has been handed back to them. Since the structure is located on the main road and causes parking issues, he said the matter has been brought to the attention of higher officials. “The building may be used for cybercrime investigations or other police-related purposes,” he explained.
