= A. C. Guards =

- Neighbourhood
- Location in Hyderabad, Telangana, India A. C. Guards (Telangana) A. C. Guards (India)
- Coordinates: 17.397°N 78.457°E
- Country: India
- State: Telangana
- District: Hyderabad
- Metro: Hyderabad
- Named for: African Cavalry Guards

Government
  - Body: GHMC

Languages
  - Official: Telugu, Urdu
- Time zone: UTC+5:30 (IST)
- PIN: 500 004
- Vehicle registration: TG
- Lok Sabha constituency: Secunderabad
- Vidhan Sabha constituency: Nampally
- Planning agency: GHMC

A. C. Guards is a locality in the city of Hyderabad, Telangana. The name A.C Guards came from the African Cavalry Guards of Hyderabad State Forces who were stationed there since the time of sixth Nizam, Mahbub Ali Khan, Asaf Jah VI.

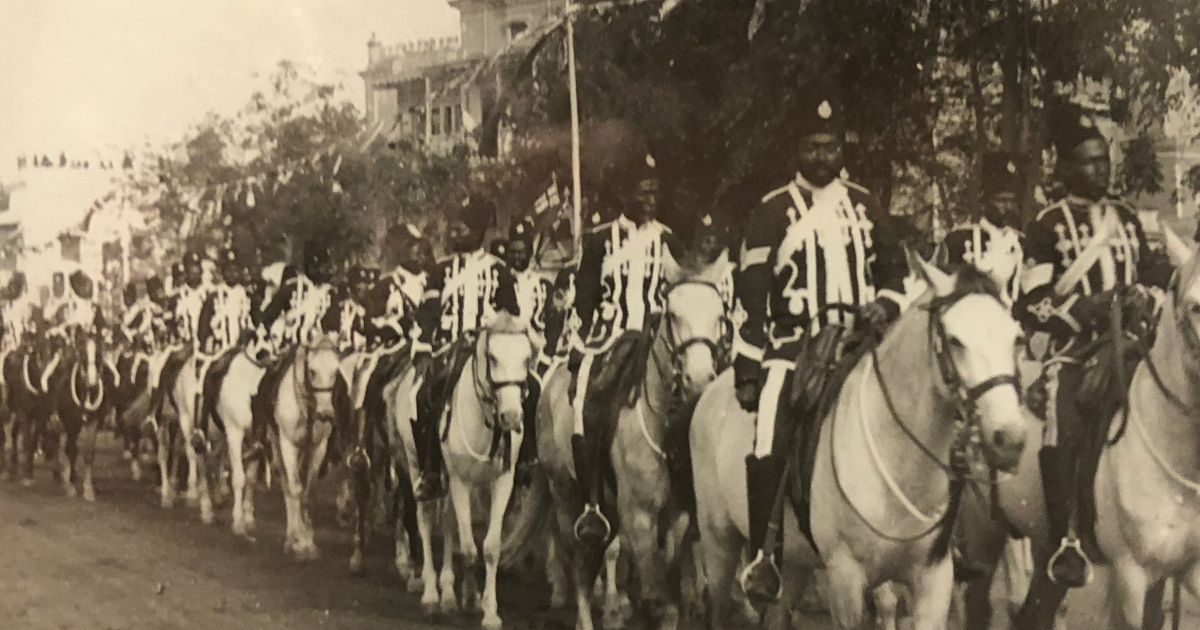
Procession of African Cavalry Guards of Hyderabad

The barracks are believed be to have been constructed more than 100 years ago and the quarters of A.C Guards were allocated to the African (Siddi) soldiers of the Nizam's army. Masab Tank, Khairtabad are areas adjacent to A.C. Guards.

In the 19th century, the 6th Nizam, Mir Mahbub Ali Khan, heard of Africans serving in the court of another Indian nobleman. Impressed by their qualities, he asked for a batch of Africans to be brought to Hyderabad. A group of around 300 young men soon followed; most accounts indicate they came voluntarily. It is said that when it came to safeguarding his family, the 7th Nizam had absolute trust in these bodyguards.

== Sports ==
- A.C. Guards Hockey Club
- Bhistiwada Youth Sports Club

== See also ==
- Nizam's Contingent
- Hyderabadi battalion
