= Sultan Bazar Clock Tower =

- Location: Hyderabad, India
- Built: 1865

The Sultan Bazar Clock Tower is a clock tower located in Hyderabad, India.

== History ==
The clock tower was built along with the Chudderghat Anglo-Vernacular School, in 1865. The clock tower located at the Government Boys High School has its entrance used as a store room by various government departments. Various attempts have been made to make the clock working again.

== See also ==
- List of clock towers
