= Parsi Fire Temple, Secunderabad =

Coordinates: 17°26′25″N 78°29′17″E

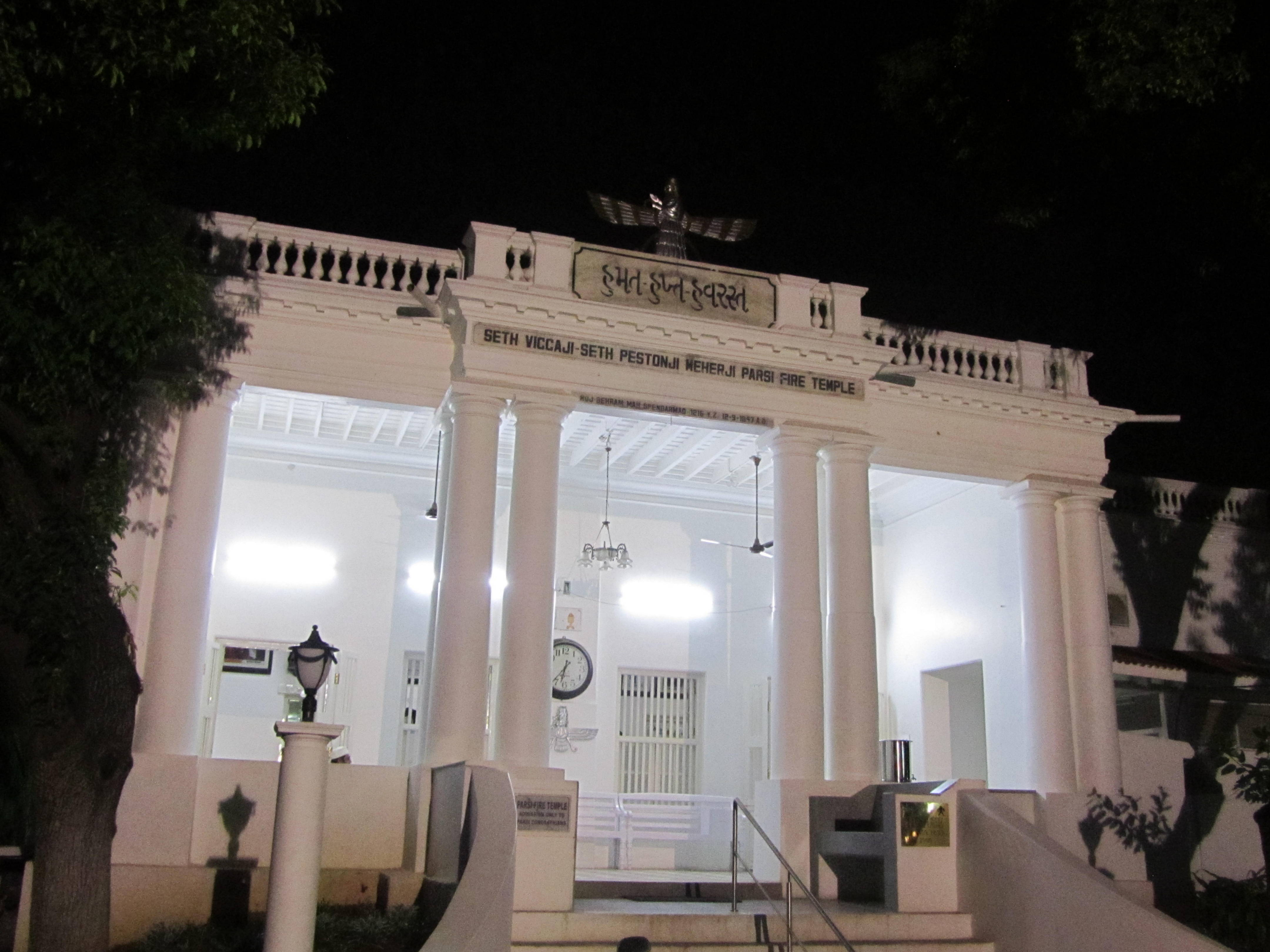
Parsi Temple at Secunderabad

Parsi Fire Temple is a place of worship for the Parsis in India. Located at MG Road in Secunderabad, Telangana, the temple is believed to have been consecrated in September 1847. The temple was built by two brothers and traders, Pestonji Meherji and Viccaji Meherji, who had settled down in Secunderabad. In addition to the temple, the compound also has residential and commercial buildings. The Parsi population in the twin cities of Hyderabad and Secunderabad is the second largest in India outside Mumbai.

== History ==
Variously called as Dar-e-Mihr, Aatish Kadah and Aagiyari, all of which mean "Fire Temple", the temple in Secunderabad was the first fire temple built in the Nizam's dominion by two Parsi brothers, Seth Viccaji Meherji and Seth Pestonji Meherji, in 1847. The facade is topped by an image of Asho Faravahar (meaning "Righteous Spirit"). Underneath the Asho Faravahar is a sign in Gujarati letters reflecting the deep impact of Gujarati on Parsi culture. The sign in Gujarati reads "Humata, Hukta, Hvarshta", which translate as "Good Thoughts, Good Words, Good Deeds."

Like other Parsi temples elsewhere, this building also has a verandah where the worshippers assemble for ritual washing of the exposed body parts before entering a spacious hall meant for Jashan and other prayers. In the heart of the building are twin rooms, one in the center and the other under the vaulted dome called Qibla, where the sacred fire is enthroned in a steel container 'Afargan' mounted on a platform. A bark-free dried wood lights the fire. Remarkably, the fire lit in 1847 remains uninterrupted till date. Only the Parsi clergy is allowed inside the Qibla. The Parsi act of worship is also called as Namaz, similar to the Muslims'.

== See also ==
- List of fire temples in India
