= Hyderabad Urban Development Authority =

Agency overview
- Formed: 1975
- Preceding agency: part of Municipal Corporation of Hyderabad
- Dissolved: 2008
- Superseding agency: HMDA
- Type: Urban Planning Agency
- Jurisdiction: Hyderabad Metropolitan Region
- Headquarters: Hyderabad, India; 17°21′57″N 78°28′33″E
- Ministers responsible: -, Chief Minister; -, Roads and Buildings; Asaduddin Owaisi, Member of Parliament India
- Agency executives: -, Chairman; -, Vice Chairman
- Parent agency: Government of Telangana
- Website: http://www.hmda.gov.in/huda/index.html

The Hyderabad Urban Development Authority (HUDA) was created in 1975, vide an act of the State Assembly of Andhra Pradesh.

== History ==
Its jurisdiction was expanded in 2008 by merging it with the surrounding mandals to form the Hyderabad Metropolitan Development Authority. Devireddy Sudheer Reddy was the Chairman of HUDA from 2004 to 2008.

Called HUDA from its 1975 foundation to 1980, the body was called the Bhagyanagar Urban Development Authority (BUDA or BDA) for 1980-1981, then reverted back to the original name Hyderabad Urban Development Authority after 1981 until its dissolution in 2008.

== Overview ==
This statutory authority was charged with the acquisition, planning and development of urban facilities and infrastructure in the city of Hyderabad with powers to delineate urban areas and to set up development authorities in these areas. Its first Chairperson was Sarojini Poula Reddy, a Congress Party Member of the State Assembly. The first Vice Chairman and chief executive officer, was Vasant Bawa, of the Indian Administrative Services. The HUDA's first activities were in the Hyderabad metropolitan area. In early 1976 the Centre for Environmental Planning and Technology (CEPT) from Ahmedabad was engaged to prepare a zonal plan, and Christopher Charles Benninger was engaged to prepare a low income township at Yousufguda, which included more than 2000 "growing houses" on plots ranging from two hundred to one thousand square feet. The idea was to provide a hygienic wet core for each house, a plinth and to allow the participants to construct their own homes. Paved footpaths, street lighting, water supply and sewerage were provided. Participants were extended low interest loans through the Housing and Urban Development Corporation (HUDCO), a central development finance agency. The Authority is currently in the process of being expanded to form the Hyderabad Metropolitan Development Authority(HMDA).

The Chief Planner of HUDA was Anant Bhide, a professional architect and urban planner.

== Related Agencies ==
- Greater Hyderabad Municipal Corporation
- Hyderabad District
