= Azampura =

Azampura (Bagh Muslim Jung)
- Neighbourhood
- Location in Telangana, India Azampura (Bagh Muslim Jung) (Telangana) Azampura (Bagh Muslim Jung) (India)
- Coordinates: 17°22′34″N 78°29′25″E
- Country: India
- State: Telangana
- District: Hyderabad
- Metro: Hyderabad

Government
  - Body: GHMC

Languages
  - Official: Telugu
- Time zone: UTC+5:30 (IST)
- PIN: 500 024
- Vehicle registration: TG
- Lok Sabha constituency: Hyderabad
- Vidhan Sabha constituency: Malakpet
- Planning agency: GHMC
- Website: telangana.gov.in

Azampura is one of the oldest neighbourhoods in Hyderabad, India, it is situated on the banks of the Musi Rivernear Dabirpura. Other nearby areas include Saidabad, Chaderghat, Malakpet and Chanchalguda. There were 27,500 residents in Azampura as of 2003. Like many other suburbs in the Old City, Azampura has a majority Muslim population. The area is home to the deputy Chief Minister of Telangana, Mohammed Mehmood Ali.

== Commercial area ==
Azampura's commercial area is concentrated around Masjid-e-Sahifa. There are many fruit stalls and restaurants serving Hyderabad's famous non-vegetarian cuisine, including biryani, haleem, nihari and kebabs.

The locality has healthcare facilities, including as Muslim Maternity Hospital and Thumbay Hospital.

== Public transport ==
Azampura is well-connected to other suburbs around Hyderabad by buses operated by the TSRTC. It is connected to long-distance places by MGBS. It also has Malakpet railway station with MMTS & Suburban services to Lingampally, HiTech city, Nampally, Secunderabad and Falaknuma, Mahbubnagar, Kurnool, Medchal, Ghatkesar, Jangoan. It is also connected to the Hyderabad Metro network through Malakpet Metro Station.

== Landmarks ==
Masjid-E-Sahifa is an important mosque in Azampura.

Old Post Sahifa is now defunct, it was a major regional post office during the 1980s and 1990.

The Azampura Chaman rotary park is a notable landmark that leads to the historic 'lorry kanta' weigh bridge.

The surrounding areas feature many playgrounds, the most famous is Tarzan Ground, hosting many local cricket tournaments. It also has a state public library and a community hall.

Azampura comes under Chaderghat PS jurisdiction.
