= Malakpet Assembly constituency =

Constituency of the Telangana legislative assembly in India

Coordinates: 17.37°N 78.49°E

Malakpet
- Constituency No. 58 for the Telangana Legislative Assembly
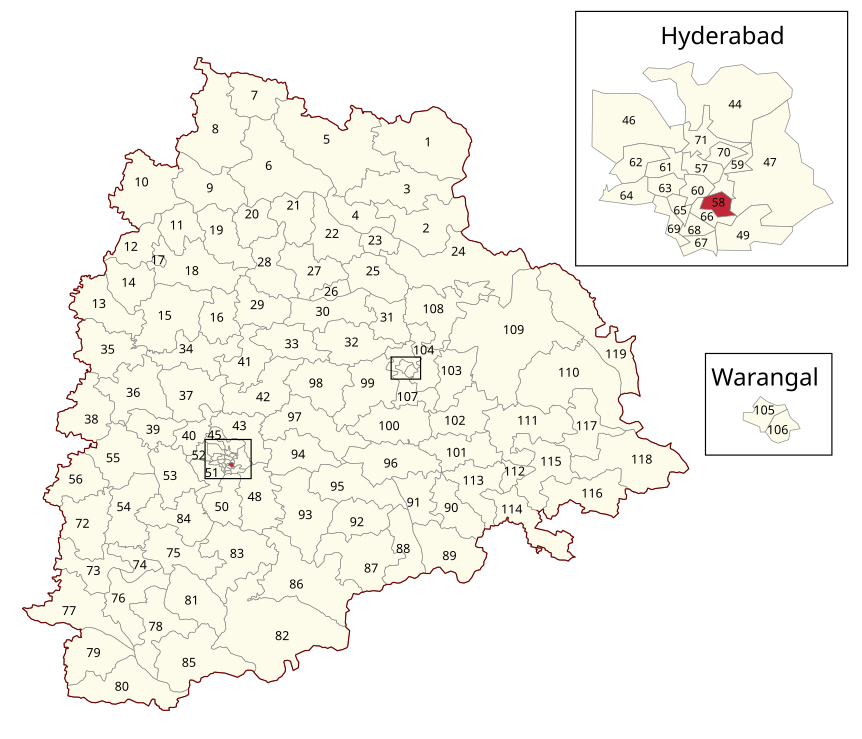
- Location of Malakpet Assembly constituency within Telangana

Constituency details
- Country: India
- Region: South India
- State: Telangana
- District: Hyderabad
- Lok Sabha constituency: Hyderabad
- Established: 1951 (75 years ago)
- Total electors: 2,61,705
- Reservation: None

Member of Legislative Assembly
- 3rd Telangana Legislative Assembly
- Incumbent Ahmed bin Abdullah Balala
- Party: AIMIM

Malakpet Assembly constituency is a constituency of Telangana Legislative Assembly, India. It is one of 15 constituencies in the capital city of Hyderabad. It is part of Hyderabad Lok Sabha constituency.

Ahmed bin Abdullah Balala of AIMIM represents the constituency.

== Extent of the constituency ==
The Assembly Constituency presently comprises the following neighbourhoods:

Neighbourhood
Malakpet
Saidabad
Chanchalguda
Azampura
Moosarambagh
Gaddiannaram (part)
Chaderghat

== Members of the Legislative Assembly ==
Year	Member	Party
Hyderabad State
1952	Abdul Rahman	People's Democratic Front
United Andhra Pradesh
1957	Mir Ahmed Ali Khan	Indian National Congress
1962	Mir Ahmed Ali Khan	Indian National Congress
1967	Sarojini Pulla Reddy	Indian National Congress
1972	Sarojini Pulla Reddy	Indian National Congress
1978	Kandala Prabhakar Reddy	Janata Party
1983	Indrasena Reddy	Bharatiya Janata Party
1985	Indrasena Reddy	Bharatiya Janata Party
1989	P. Sudhir Kumar	Indian National Congress
1994	Malreddy Ranga Reddy	Telugu Desam Party
1999	Indrasena Reddy	Bharatiya Janata Party
2004	Malreddy Ranga Reddy	Indian National Congress
2009	Ahmed bin Abdullah Balala	All India Majlis-e-Ittehadul Muslimeen
Telangana
2014	Ahmed bin Abdullah Balala	All India Majlis-e-Ittehadul Muslimeen
2018	Ahmed bin Abdullah Balala	All India Majlis-e-Ittehadul Muslimeen
2023	Ahmed bin Abdullah Balala	All India Majlis-e-Ittehadul Muslimeen

== Election results ==
=== 2023 ===
2023 Telangana Legislative Assembly election: Malakpet
Party	Candidate	Votes	%	±%
AIMIM	Ahmed Bin Abdullah Balala	55,805	42.27	
INC	Shaik Akbar	29,699	22.50	
BJP	Samreddy Surender Reddy	23,731	17.97	
BRS	T. Ajeet Reddy	18,646	14.12	
NOTA	None of the above	881	0.67	
Independent	10 Independent Candidates	1,006	0.76	
Others	13 Other Party Candidates	2,256	1.70	
Majority		26,106	19.77	
Turnout				
AIMIM hold		Swing		

=== 2018 ===
2018 Telangana Legislative Assembly election: Malakpet
Party	Candidate	Votes	%	±%
AIMIM	Ahmed Bin Abdullah Balala	53,281	42.86	
TDP	Mohammed Muzaffar Ali Khan	29,769	23.95	
BJP	Ale Jeetendra	20,880	16.80	
TRS	C. Satish Kumar	17,103	13.76	
NOTA	None of the above	920	0.74	
Independent	7 Independent Candidates	844	0.67	
Others	9 Other Party Candidates	1,518	1.21	
Majority		23,512	18.91	
Turnout				
AIMIM hold		Swing		

=== 2014 ===
2014 Telangana Legislative Assembly election: Malakpet
Party	Candidate	Votes	%	±%
AIMIM	Ahmed Bin Abdullah Balala	58,976	47.24	
BJP	B. Venkat Reddy	35,713	28.61	
TRS	C. Satish Kumar	11,378	9.11	
INC	V.N. Reddy	8,320	6.66	
YSRCP	Hari Krishna Goud Lingala	5,421	4.34	
LSP	Alleni Babu Rao	1,522	1.22	
NOTA	None of the Above	856	0.69	
AAP	Gaddam Sridhar	824	0.66	
BSP	P. Aravind	458	0.37	
Independent	5 Independent Candidates	1,139	0.91	
Others	2 Other Party Candidates	236	0.19	
Majority		23,263	18.63	
Turnout				
AIMIM hold		Swing		

=== 2009 ===
2009 Andhra Pradesh Legislative Assembly election: Malakpet
Party	Candidate	Votes	%	±%
AIMIM	Ahmed Bin Abdullah Balala	30,839	30.44	
TDP	Md. Muzaffar Ali Khan	22,468	22.18	
INC	M. Vijaya Simha Reddy	18,243	18.01	
BJP	G. R. Karunakar	16,997	16.78	
LSP	Dr. M. Pandu Ranga Rao	6,214	6.13	
PRP	C. Raju @ Karate Raju	5,002	4.94	
Independent	5 Independent Candidates	704	0.69	
Others	3 Other Party Candidates	830	0.82	
Majority		8,371	8.26	
Turnout				
AIMIM hold		Swing		

=== 2004 ===
2004 Andhra Pradesh Legislative Assembly election: Malakpet
Party	Candidate	Votes	%	±%
INC	Malreddy Ranga Reddy	138,907	52.12	
TDP	Manchireddy Kishan Reddy	115,549	43.35	
Independent	9 Independent Candidates	6,852	2.57	
Others	4 Other Party Candidates	5,231	1.96	
Majority		23,358	8.77	
Turnout				
INC gain from BJP		Swing		

=== 1999 ===
1999 Andhra Pradesh Legislative Assembly election: Malakpet
Party	Candidate	Votes	%	±%
BJP	Indrasena Reddy Nallu	118,937	53.24	
INC	Sudheer Kumar P	69,617	31.16	
CPI	Azeez Pasha Syed	30,284	13.56	
JD(S)	M.A. Mujeeb	735	0.33	
Independent	8 Independent Candidates	1,622	0.73	
Others	6 Other Party Candidates	2,210	0.99	
Majority		49,320	22.08	
Turnout				
BJP gain from TDP		Swing		

=== 1994 ===
1994 Andhra Pradesh Legislative Assembly election: Malakpet
Party	Candidate	Votes	%	±%
TDP	M. Ranga Reddy	54,441	32.91	
BJP	Indrasena Reddy Nallu	47,857	28.93	
INC	P. Sudheer Kumar	36,244	21.91	
Independent	A.A. Syed Musa Athan Bai	9,965	6.02	
AIMIM	S.A. Haq Nazeer	7,342	4.44	
SP	Kandala Prabhakar Reddy	3,023	1.83	
MBT	Mehraj Khan	1,017	0.61	
RPI	N. Srinivas	557	0.34	
Independent	17 Independent Candidates	4,854	2.96	
Others	1 Other Party Candidate	120	0.07	
Majority		6,584	3.98	
Turnout				
TDP gain from INC		Swing		

== See also ==
- Malakpet
- List of constituencies of Telangana Legislative Assembly
