= Michel Joachim Marie Raymond =

French military personnel (1755–1798)

Nawab, Ashdar-ud-Daula, Ashdar Jung Michel Joachim Marie Raymond Bahadur
- Michel Joachim Marie Raymond
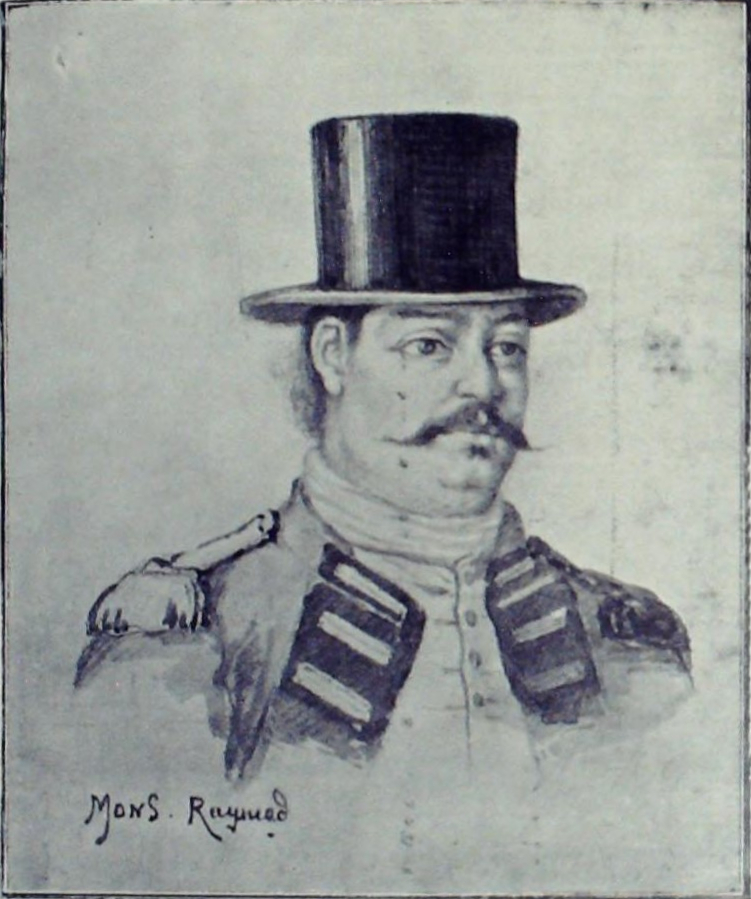
- Monsieur Raymond
- Born: September 25, 1755; Sérignac, Tarn-et-Garonne, Kingdom of France
- Died: March 25, 1798 (aged 42); Hyderabad, Mughal Empire in present-day India
- Burial place: Raymond's Tomb
- Relatives: William Jean Raymond (Brother)
- Military career
- Allegiance: Kingdom of Mysore (1778–1783); French EIC (1783–1785); Hyderabad State (1785-1798)
- Branch: Army
- Service years: 1778–1798
- Rank: Sub Lieutenant, (Mysore Army, 1778–1783); Captain (French EIC, 1783–1785), ADC to Gen. de Bussy; General (Hyderabad State, (1785–1798)
- Nicknames: Musa Ram and Musa Rahim
- Units: Corps de Chevalier de Lasse, (Mysore Army, 1778–1783)
- Commands: Corps Francois de Raymond or Nizam's French Corps
- Conflicts: Third Anglo-Mysore War; Battle of Kharda; Rebellion of Mir Ali Jah (June 1795)
- Memorials: Raymond's Tomb

General Michel Joachim Marie Raymond (25 September 1755 – 25 March 1798), popularly known as Monsieur Raymond, was a French General in Nizam Ali Khan, Asaf Jah II's military and the founder of Gunfoundry, Hyderabad. He was born in Sérignac, Gascony, France, the son of a merchant.

== Early life ==
In 1775, aged 20, he and his younger brother, William Jean Raymond, left for Pondicherry, India. The idea as he told his father, was to set up a merchant shop. Instead, Michel turned to the more exciting career of being a soldier.

== Life ==
In 1775, Raymond reached Pondicherry to start a merchant shop. In 1778, following the French support of American revolutionaries, forces from Madras captured Pondicherry. Raymond went to Mysore and enlisted in the Corps of Chevalier de Lasse as a Sub-Lieutenant. After the death of Hyder Ali, he met and served under French General Bussy as his ADC with the rank of a captain. After the death of De Bussy in 1786 Michel joined the service of the ruling Nizam of Hyderabad. He began as any other soldier, shortly after, he was given 300 soldiers to command.

In 1796, Raymond was appointed Amin Jinsi or Comptroller of Ordnance. He established several cannon and cannonball factories. Under his guidance guns, ammunition and cannons were forged. Gunfoundry or Top ka Sancha near the Fathe Maidan is the best-known of the remaining foundries in India.

When he died on 25 March 1798, only twelve years after enlisting, he had become a military commander of over 14,000 army men. It is also documented that there may have been a female battalion of soldiers. The cause of Michel Raymond's death is a mystery, the two suggested causes are poisoning or suicide.

Raymond was succeeded by his second-in-command, Jean-Pierre Piron. However, due to English intrigues at Hyderabad court, his French Corps was disbanded on 21 Oct 1798.

== Respect ==
His full title was Nawab Ashar-ud-Daula, Ashdar Jung, Monsieur M. Raymond Bahadur.

Raymond became a close friend of the Nizam Ali Khan, Asaf Jah II. Raymond was not only held in high esteem by the Nizam, but had also won the love and trust of the local people. He made himself popular through his kindness, bravery and contribution to Hyderabad. To the Muslims, he was Musa Rahim, and to the Hindus, he was Musa Ram. George Bruce Malleson said that

"No European of mark who followed him in India, ever succeeded in gaining to such an extent the love, the esteem, the admiration of the natives of the country."

== Raymond's Tomb ==
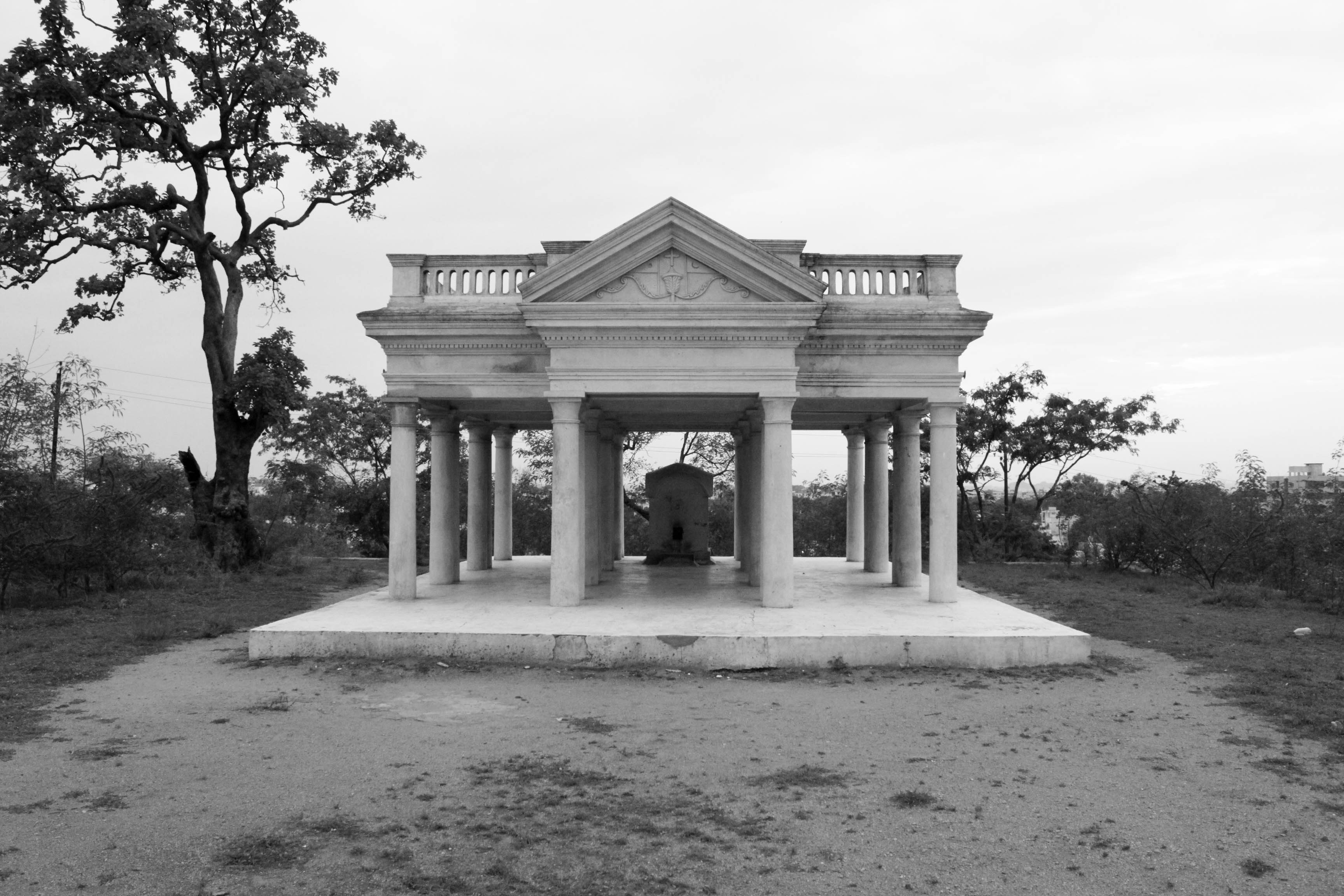
A remote view of tomb

Michel Raymond's tomb is a black granite tombstone, conical in shape, about 7 metres (23 ft) high and it has the initials JR on it. The ill-maintained pavilion was built by the Nizam and collapsed in October 2001 in heavy rain. The 200-year-old tomb had a face lift, including a brand new pavilion. Opened 14 April 2003 this cost an estimated ₹500,000 (equivalent to ₹2.0 million or US$21,000 in 2026).

The tomb is located near Asmangadh fort on top of a hillock at Musa Ram Bagh, Malakpet, about 3 kilometres (1.9 mi) from the Oliphant Bridge (currently known as Chaderghat Bridge), in East Hyderabad. Until about 1940, people would visit his tomb on the anniversary of his death, taking incense and other offerings to him. His grave had become like a shrine. He is also remembered in Hyderabad, with the area called Musa Ram Bagh (Monsieur Raymond).
