= Yakutpura =

Yakutpura Bada Bazar Yakutpura Old City, Hyderabad
- Inner city
- Nickname: Yakut
- Location in Telangana, India Yakutpura Bada Bazar (Telangana) Yakutpura Bada Bazar (India)
- Coordinates: 17°21′33″N 78°29′13″E
- Country: India
- State: Telangana
- District: Hyderabad District
- Metro: Hyderabad Metropolitan Development Authority

Government
  - Body: GHMC

Population
  - Total: Approx. 6 Lakhs (600,000)

Telgu Languages
  - Official: Major - Urdu, Minor - Telugu
- Time zone: UTC+5:30 (IST)
- PIN: 500023
- Vehicle registration: TS
- Lok Sabha constituency: Hyderabad
- Vidhan Sabha constituency: Yakutpura
- Planning agency: GHMC
- Website: telangana.gov.in

Yakutpura is a traditional neighbourhoods in the Old City, Hyderabad in Telangana state, India. With a population of 6,3350 inhabitants, the size of the area is about 5.7 square kilometers.

Named by the Nizam of Hyderabad, the word Ya·kut (yä-koot), from Yakutpura, is a Persian word for ruby.

Hyderabad is known as the "City of Pearls". During the era of the 7th Nizam (Mir Osman Ali Khan), the Hyderabad State was a business market of gems and pearls. Yakutpura was one of the parts of the Nizam's State and hence its name was coined. A part of Yakutpura is also called Brahmin-wadi where Brahmins live.

== Commercial area ==
Yakutpura is one of the largest neighbourhoods of the Old City. It is situated close to the historic sites of Charminar and Mecca Masjid. Yakutpura is connected to Dabeer Pura through one of the oldest bridges (flyover) in Hyderabad. In addition, the area is well connected to public transports, as it is home to an MMTS train station. The local language is Telugu, but Hindi and English are commonly spoken and understood. Yakutpura is also close to the Bibi ka Alawa, HEH Nizam's Museum, and Salarjung Museum.

Yakutpura comes under the South Zone of Hyderabad. The South Zone, also called Old City or Purana Shahar, is a shopping area and also home to most of Hyderabad's historical sights. Other areas in the South Zone include Charminar, Patthargatti, Afzalgunj, Shalibanda, Falaknuma, Dabirpura, and Purani Haveli.

Syed Ahmed Pasha Quadri was a previous MLA of Yakutpura. The current MLA is Jaffar Hussain Mehraj of All India Majlis-e-Ittehadul Muslimeen.

== Hospitals and public health ==
Apart from numerous clinics, there are few hospitals located in Yakutpura, including one of the city's oldest children's hospitals the Durru Shehvar Children's & General Hospital. Princess Esra Hospital at MoghulPura, Owaisi Hospital at Chandrayangutta, Jaferia Hospital at NoorKhan Bazar and Osmania Hospital at Afzal Gunj are all nearby.

== Entertainment ==
One of the oldest movie theaters in Hyderabad, known as the "Yakut Mahal Deluxe", is located here and shows old Hindi movies, though screenings have been affected by the COVID-19 pandemic. Another theatre, named "Suraj Talkies" was closed and replaced with a new hotel.

== Localities in Yakutpura ==
- Azmath Nagar
- Aman Nagar
- Brahmanwadi (Gandhi Bomma)
- Bada Bazaar
- Bhavani Nagar
- Chandra Nagar
- Talab Katta
- Murad Mahal
- Zafar Road
- Rein Bazar
- Ganga nagar (Rehal Kamaan)
- Maddanapet
- Edi Bazar
- Sheikh Faiz Kaman
- Yakutpura Station Road
- Bagh-E-Jahan Ara
- SRT Colony
- Murtuza Nagar
- Qasim colony
- Chowni Nade Ali Baig
- Wahed Colony
- Dewdi Suryar Jung
- Al Jabri Colony
- Pathar Ka Makaan

== Areas around Yakutpura ==
- Dabirpura
- Purani Haveli
- Alijah Kotla
- Saidabad
- Chanchalguda

== Public transport ==
Yakutpura is connected by buses run nearby TSRTC. Buses are 82 and 77. There is a MMTS train station at Yakutpura. the MGBS metro station is the closest metro station to Yakutpura, at 4 km away.
