= Healthcare in Hyderabad =

== History of healthcare in Hyderabad ==
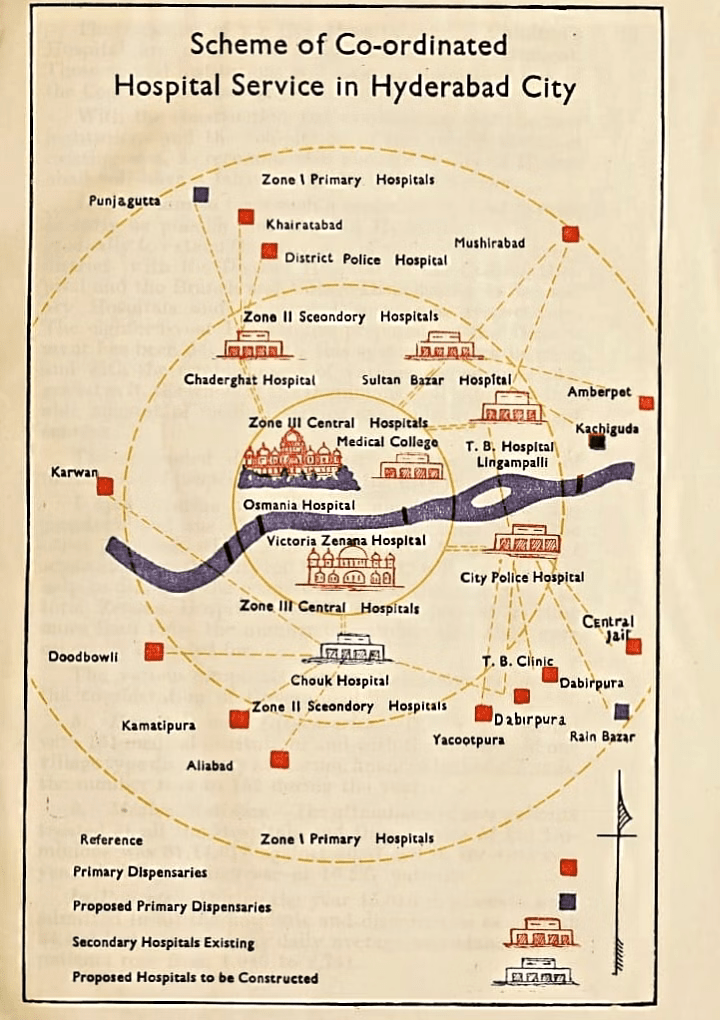
Scheme of Coordinated Hospitals service in Hyderabad. As per survey done in 1941-42

In 1595, then ruler of Hyderabad Quli Qutb Shah had established Dar-ul-Shifa. This was the first hospital in Hyderabad. Dar-ul-Shifa is no longer a hospital and has been converted into Aashurkhana. The age of modern medicare for subjects of Hyderabad started in 1886 with the establishment of Osmania General Hospital.

== Healthcare today ==
The health care system in Hyderabad, India consists of 50 government hospitals, with bed facility of 5749, and the city has around 165 Private hospitals and up to 4000 clinics and Nursing Homes and 500 diagnostic centres, Total providing up to 12,000 bed spaces in general. The health scenario in Hyderabad is standardized and easily affordable than many other cities in India. The majority of residents prefer treatment at private health sector and the proportion of 28% of residents uses government facilities,

The city is home to the age old Osmania Medical College along with various private super specialty hospitals like Apollo Hospitals and Yashoda Hospitals among others.

The Indian Heart Association, is a non-profit NGO headquartered in Jubilee Hills, Hyderabad dedicated to raising cardiovascular health awareness among the South Asian population.

Ferty9 is a fertility healthcare provider based in Hyderabad, Telangana, offering a range of assisted reproductive services such as IVF, IUI, and ICSI. With multiple centers across the city, the organization focuses on diagnostic and treatment solutions for male and female infertility using established clinical practices and modern technologies.

The government offers a social safety net in the form of Aarogyasri which provides free healthcare to qualified people.
