= Chaderghat =

- Inner City
- Location in Telangana, India Chaderghat (Telangana) Chaderghat (India)
- Coordinates: 17°22′N 78°30′E
- Country: India
- State: Telangana
- District: Hyderabad
- Metro: Hyderabad

Government
  - Body: GHMC

Population (2001)
  - Total: 300,000

Languages
  - Official: Telugu, Urdu
- Time zone: UTC+5:30 (IST)
- PIN: 500 024
- Lok Sabha constituency: Hyderabad
- Vidhan Sabha constituency: Malakpet
- Planning agency: GHMC

Chaderghat is considered one of the busiest areas of Hyderabad city, in Telangana and is located on the banks of Musi River. Chaderghat Bridge was built during the time of the Nizams of Hyderabad State and connects major suburbs to the main city. The original name of Chadherghat was "Oliphant Nagar".

== History ==
The Urdu word Chadar is used to refer to a white sheet of cloth. The locality was so-called after an anicut across the river which formed a ‘Chadar’ or a sheet of water. The famous Chaderghat bridge, or Oliphant Bridge as it was known then, was built in 1831 and named after James Oliphant.

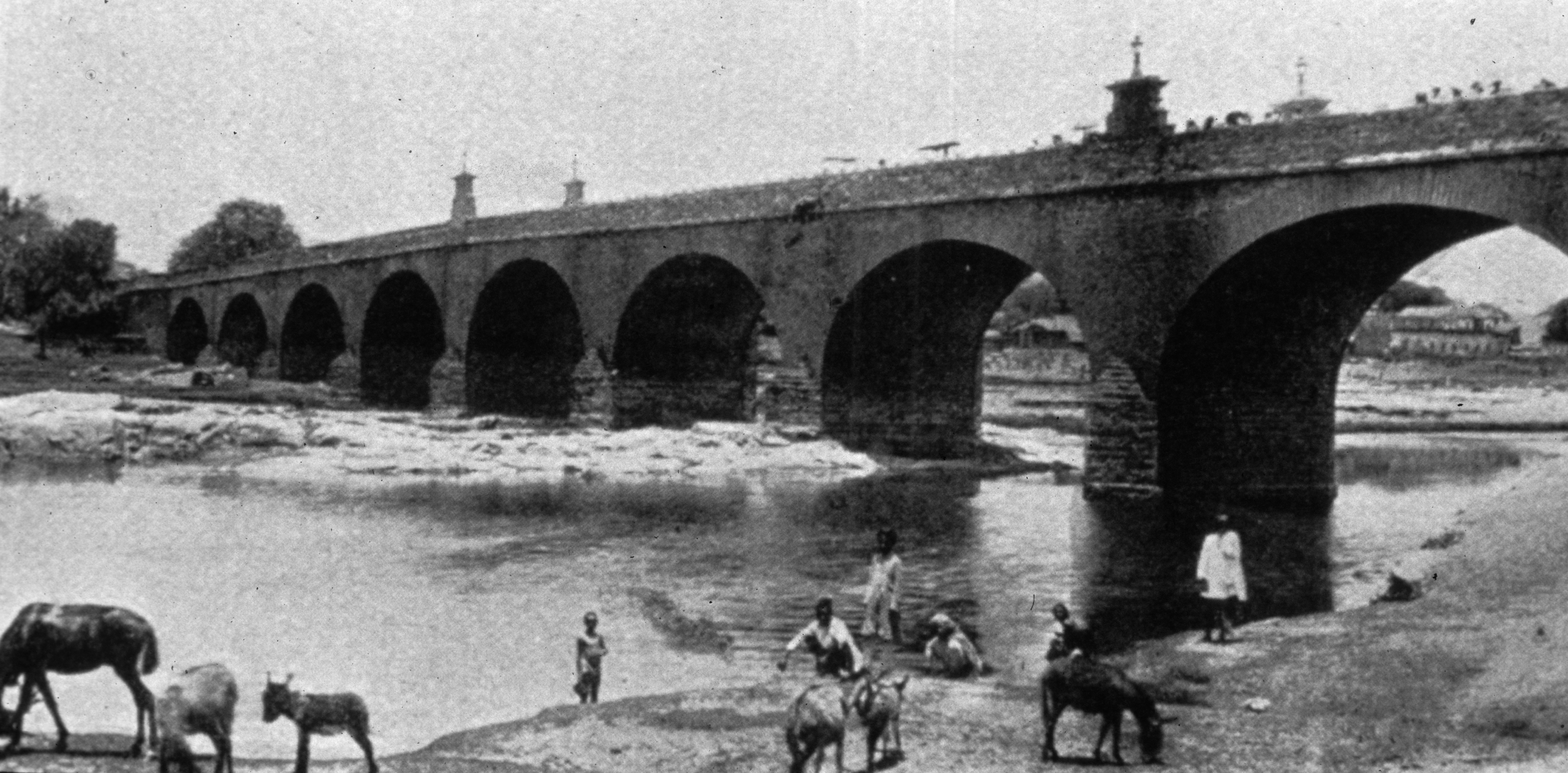
View of Chaderghat bridge in 1890s

Chaderghat was first declared a Municipality in 1886. In 1933, it was merged with Hyderabad Municipality to form Hyderabad Municipal Corporation. Chaderghat is surrounded by Koti, Gowliguda, Kachiguda, Darulshifa and Malakpet Localities.

== Commercial Significance ==
There is a shopping area with various shopping malls and corner grocery stores.

The Hyderabadi restaurant, Niagara is located here. This is also a home to few popular movie theatres Kamal and Tirumala which are now closed because of space issues. Chaderghat main road is named after former Indian President Dr. Rajendra Prasad, and is also referred as Dr. Rajendra Prasad Marg.

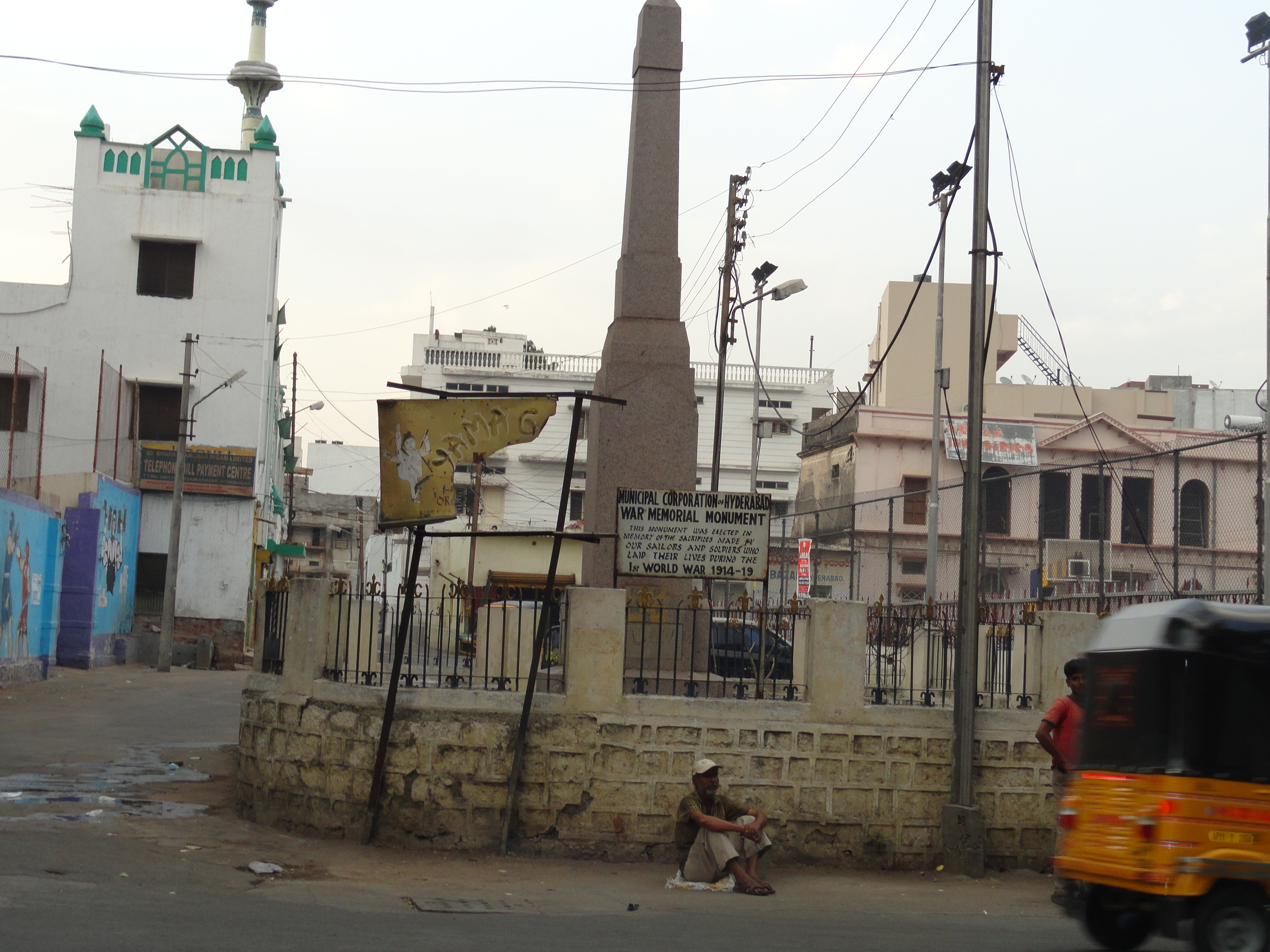
Monument to soldiers from Hyderabad who fought in World War 1 at Chaderghat

== Health Institutes ==
It is home to the multi-speciality hospitals like Care Hospital. The Yashoda Hospital is located nearby at Malakpet.

== Transport ==
Chaderghat is well connected by TSRTC buses.

The nearest MMTS Train station is at Malakpet.

TSRTC bus terminal MGBS (Mahatma Gandhi Bus Station) is located 0.5 km from Chaderghat.
