= Malakpet =

- Old City
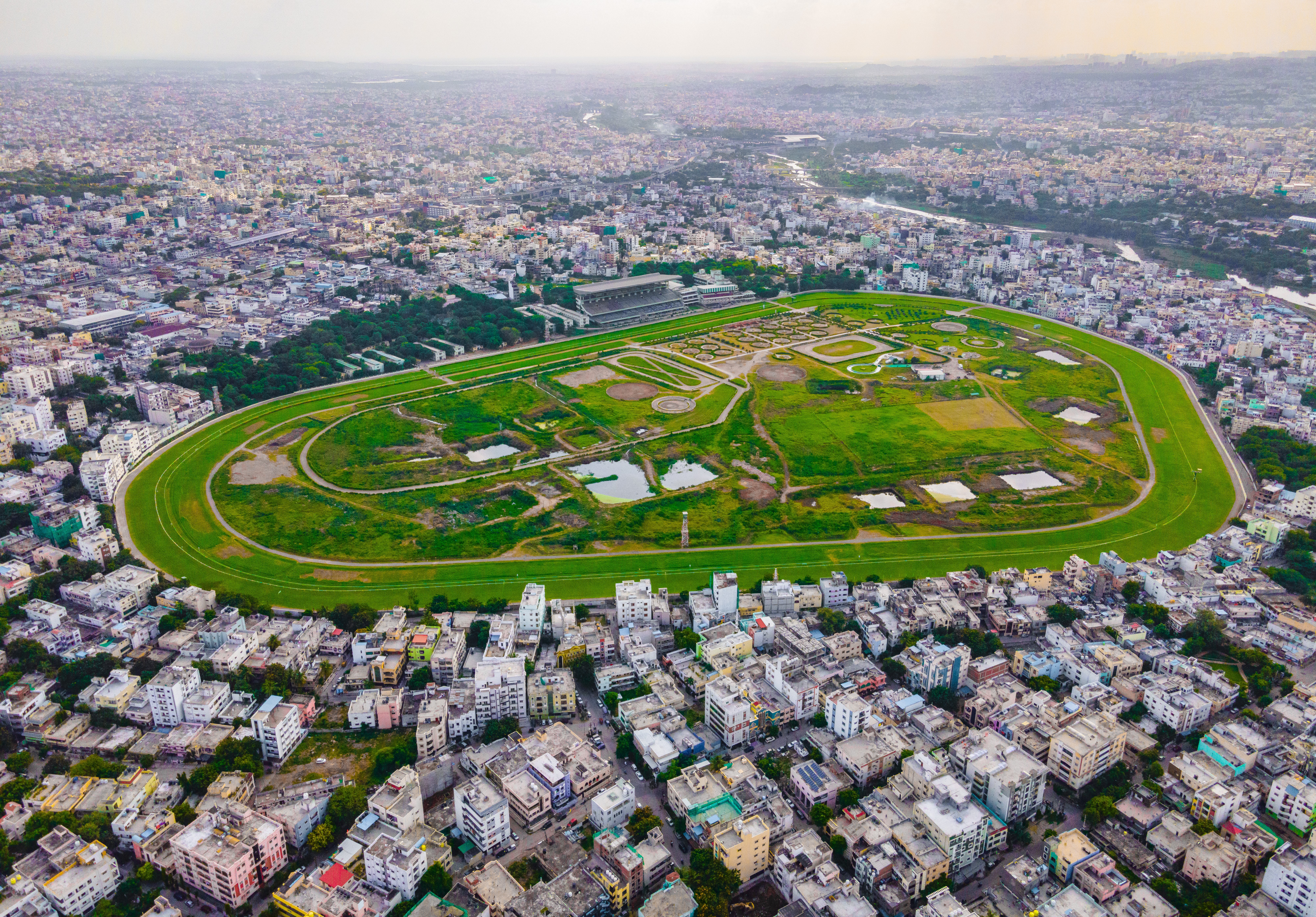
- Aerial view of Hyderabad Race Club

- Location in Hyderabad, India Malakpet (India)
- Coordinates: 17°22′N 78°30′E
- Country: India
- State: Telangana
- District: Hyderabad District
- City: Hyderabad
- Region: Old City

Government
  - Body: GHMC

Languages
  - Official: Urdu, Telugu
- Time zone: UTC+5:30 (IST)
- PIN: 500036
- Vehicle registration: TG-11
- Lok Sabha constituency: Hyderabad
- Vidhan Sabha constituency: Malakpet
- Planning agency: GHMC
- Website: telangana.gov.in

Malakpet is one of the neighbourhoods in the old city area of Hyderabad, Telangana, India. This is further divided into two parts, Old Malakpet and New Malakpet, and is traditionally considered part of old city. This circle (6) comes under Charminar Zone of Greater Hyderabad Municipal Corporation. There are seven wards in this circle, namely, Saidabad (24), Moosrambagh (25), Old Malakpet (26), Akberbagh (27), Azampura (28), Chawani (29) and Dabeerpura (30).

Ahmed Bin Abdullah Balala of the All India Majlis-e-Ittehadul Muslimeen party was elected MLA from the Malakpet Assembly constituency for the fourth time in 2023.

== History ==
The locality was named after Malik Yaqoub, a servant of the Golconda King Abdullah Qutb Shah, where he lived and had a market.

In 1886 The Hyderabad Race Club was shifted here from Moula Ali, as Asaf Jah VI wanted it to be closer to his palace. Soon, he also built the Mahbub Mansion right by the Race Course.

== Locality ==
Malakpet is a traditional part of Hyderabad. It is bordered by Amberpet and Moosarambagh in the north, Dilsukhnagar in the east, Chaderghat in the west and Saidabad in the south.

=== Landmarks ===
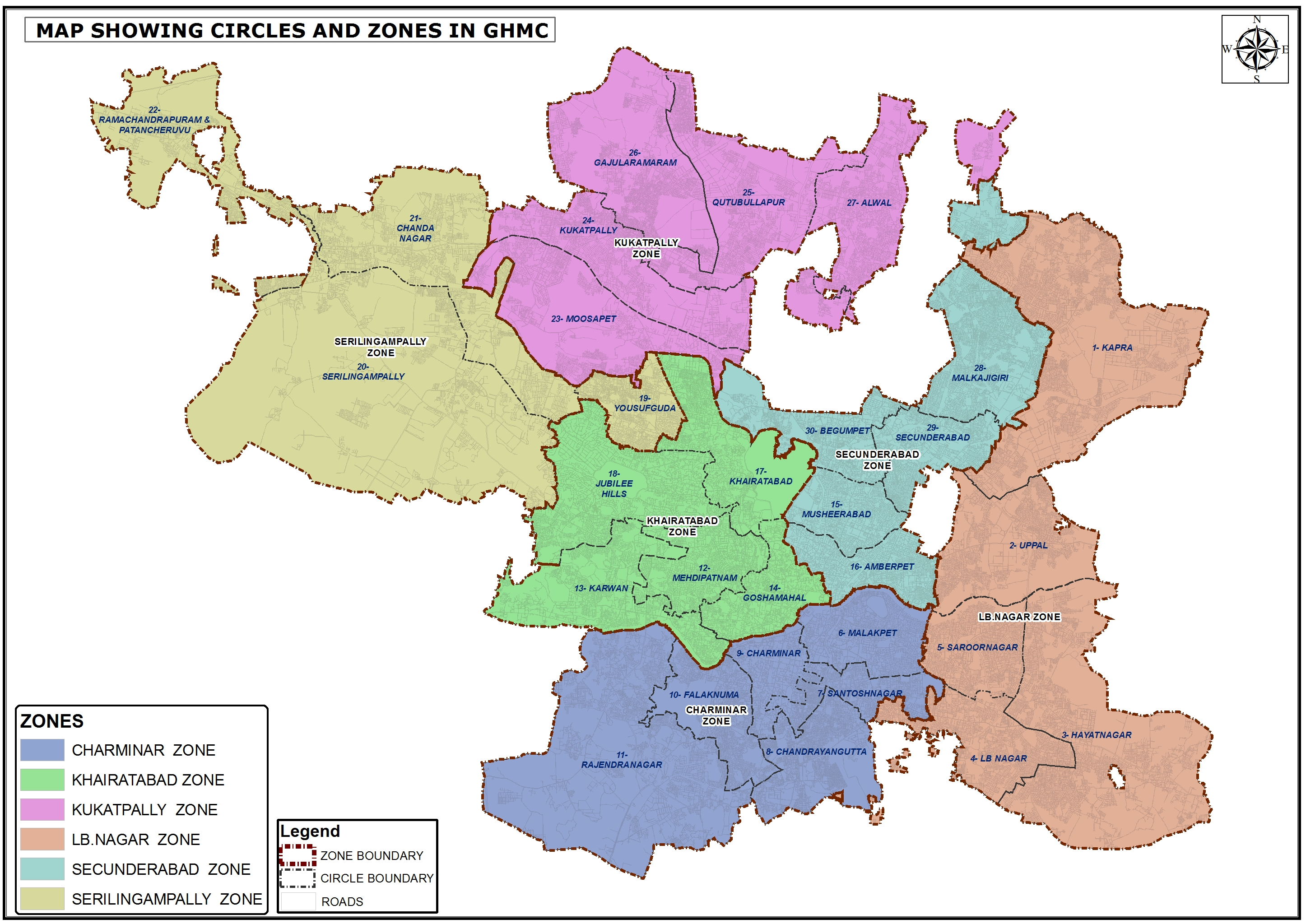
GHMC New Zones, Circles Map of 2019.

The major landmarks here are the popular Hyderabad Race Club, and also the historic Mahbub Mansion Market or Mahbub Gunj Market. The Asman Garh Palace and Monsieur Raymond's Tomb are other historical places located here.

Apart from historical places, Malakpet also has galleria mall with nearby metro connectivity. It is famous for a TV tower built by Teegala Sri Ramulu.

The Palmetum is a specialised botanical garden, featuring only different palm trees. It was established in 2002 by Greater Hyderabad Municipal Corporation.

View point apartment is also located in Malakpet.

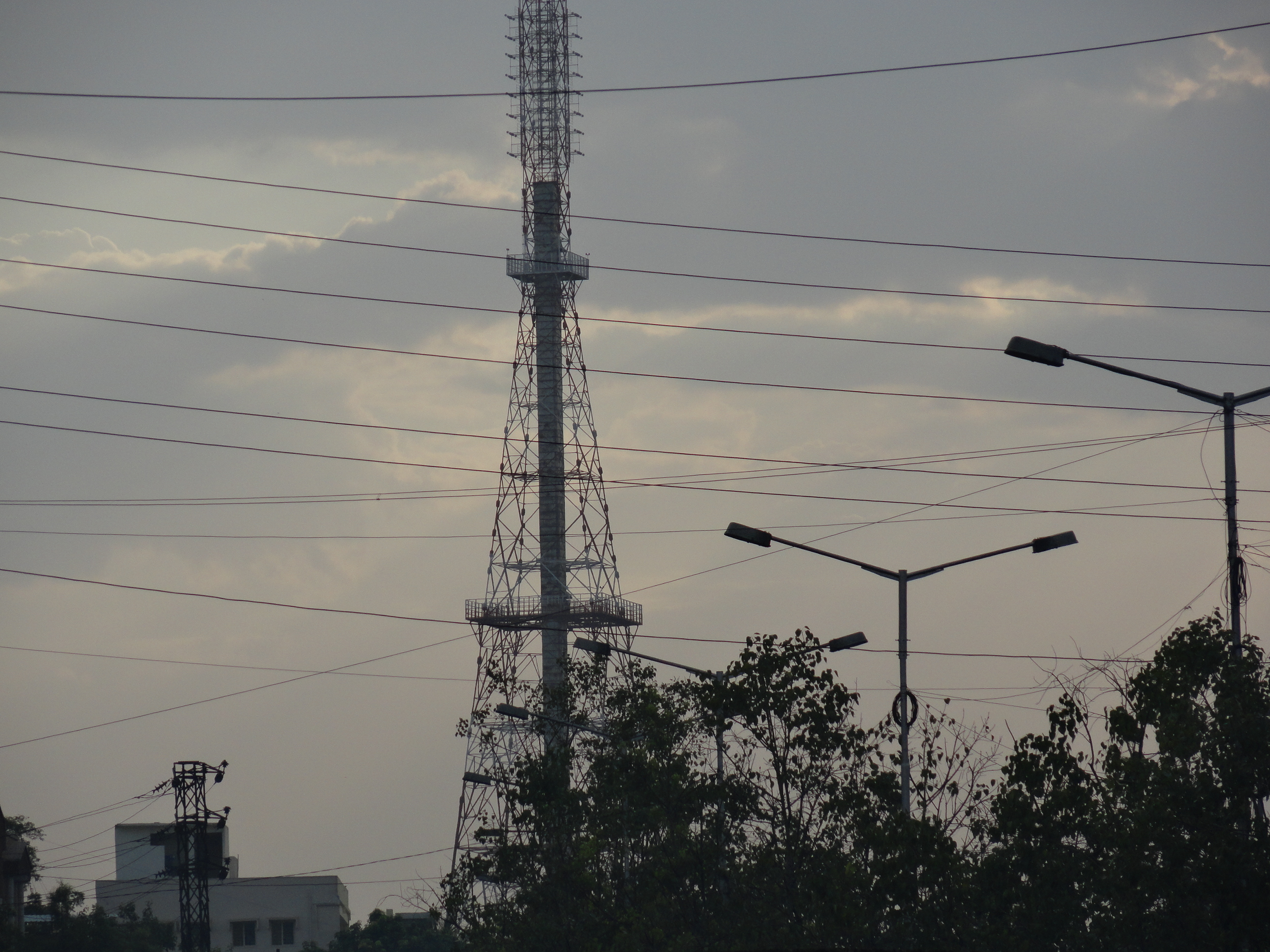
TV tower at Malakpet

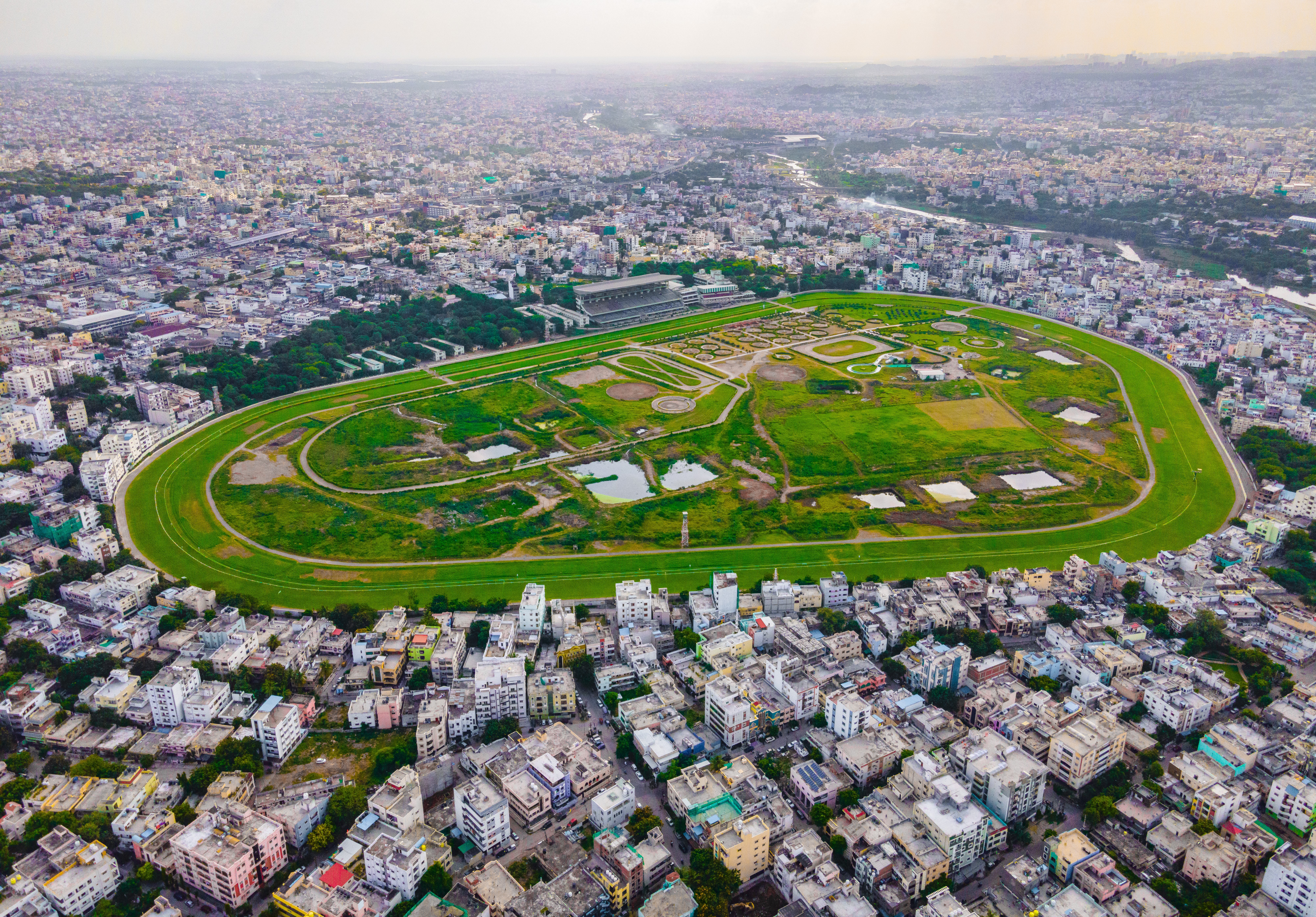
Aerial View of the Hyderabad Race Club

=== Malakpet IT tower ===
On 2 October 2023, BRS Working President, Minister for Municipal Administration & Urban Development, Industries and IT&C K. T. Rama Rao laid the foundation stone of 30-floor Malakpet IT tower- iTek Nucleus in Moosarambagh area. The IT tower will span 11 acres with a built-up space of 15 lakh sqft with a cost of Rs. 701 crores and will create 50,000 direct and indirect jobs. IT Tower is set to be completed in 36 months. The IT tower will be near to Musarambagh metro station.

=== Commercial Area ===
The Nalgonda "X" Roads Junction is a major commercial hub.

== Transport ==
The state-owned TSRTC runs the city bus service, connecting the neighborhood to all the major centres of the city. All the buses running from Dilsukhnagar and Midhani bus depots pass through Malakpet. Malakpet metro station is nearby. Malakpet has an MMTS train station, which is used for commuting. The Nalgonda X Road connects the nearby busy areas of Dilsukhnagar and Sayeedabad and is a hub of huge traffic. It is also connected by Metro Train with two stations, one at Mahboob Mansion and the other at the Malakpet MMTS railway station.
