= Aliya High School for Boys =

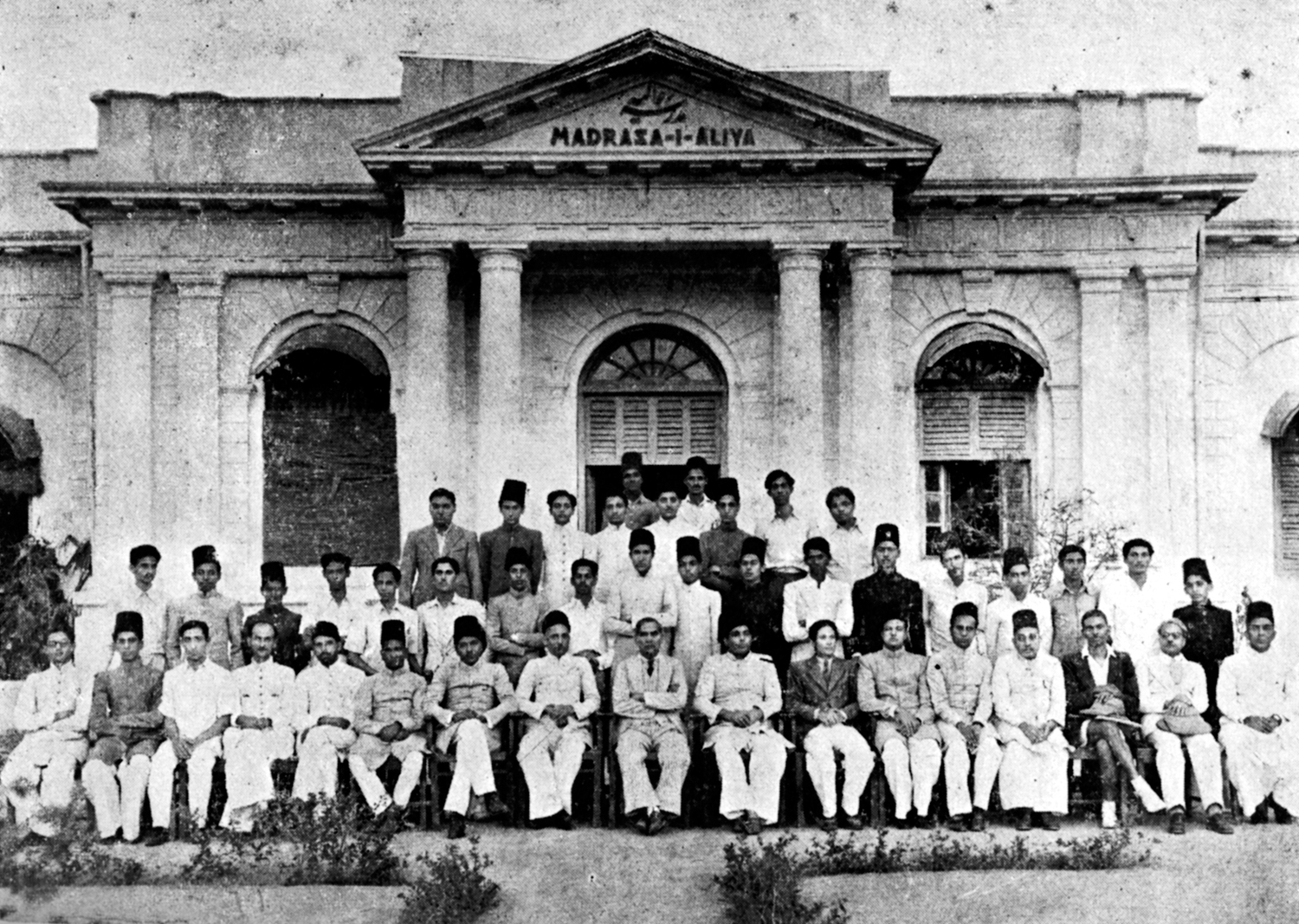
- Class photograph of Madrasa-i-Aliya, in 1890s

Location
- Gunfoundry, Hyderabad; India
- Coordinates: 17.3992418°N 78.473442°E

Information
- Funding type: State Government
- Established: 1872
- Founder: The Nizams

Aliya High School for Boys, previously known as Madrassa-e-Aliya, is a government-owned school located at Gunfoundry, Hyderabad.

== History ==
The school was established in 1872 during the reign of the Nizams for the elite and served the city's nobility, and was supposedly one of the best schools in Hyderabad till the 1960s.

It was managed by Anglo-Indians, but after Operation Polo the school management was brought under the control of the state government which reportedly brought about its downfall. The school building is listed as a heritage building. The school was renamed 1948, the school then known as Madrassa-e-Aliya was founded by Salar Jung I in the Nizam College premises. The school which once served the elite and the nobility now caters to the children of poor.

== Alumni ==
Name	Notability	References
Ali Nawaz Jung		
Ali Yavar Jung		
Aneesur Rahman		
Asif Iqbal		
Ghulam Ahmed		
Idris Hasan Latif		
Kishen Pershad		
Mehdi Nawaz Jung		
Mir Osman Ali Khan		
Muffakham Jah		
Mukarram Jah		
Raja Rao		

== See also ==
- Education in India
- List of schools in India
