= The Palmetum, Malakpet =

Specialized botanical garden

Coordinates: 17°22′30″N 78°30′04″E

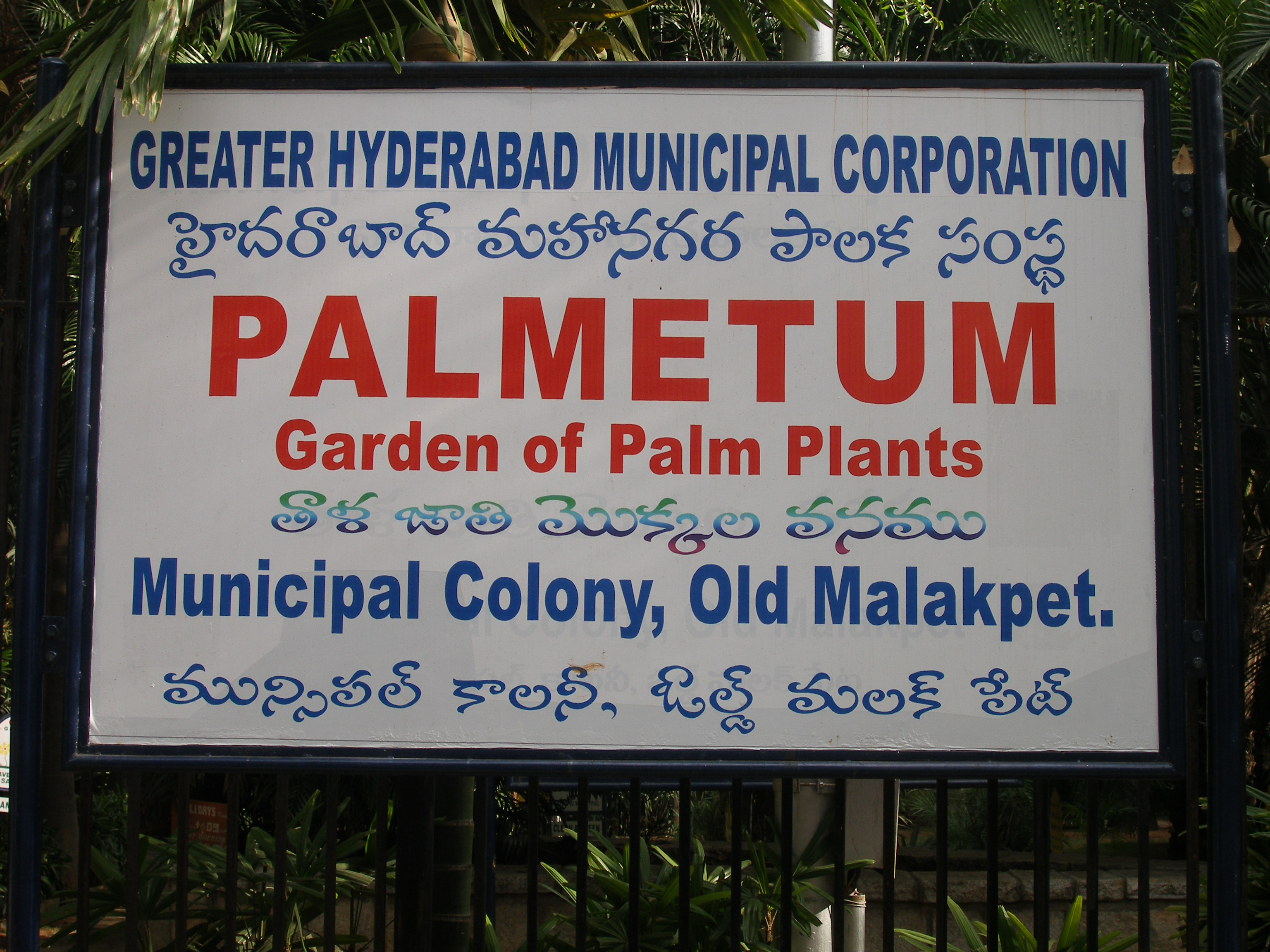

The Palmetum is a specialized botanical garden located in the Malakpet area, Hyderabad, in Telangana, which features only one family of plant: the palms.

The garden's collection contains all six subfamilies within the family Arecaceae, with a total of about 120 varieties of 250 trees. It was initiated in 2002 by Chandramohan Reddy, Director of Urban Forestry, Municipal Corporation of Hyderabad. Some of the samples were obtained from Malaysia and Madagascar.

This park is mainly used by senior citizens for walking and young adults use it for jogging and yoga.

== List of palm genera ==
- Aiphanes
- Archontophoenix: Archontophoenix alexandrae
- Areca: Areca catechu
- Arenga
- Bismarckia: Bismarckia nobilis
- Borassus: Borassus flabellifer
- Brahea: Brahea armata
- Butia
- Calamus: Calamus rotang
- Carpentaria
- Caryota
- Chamaedorea
- Chamaerops: Chamaerops humilis
- Chambeyronia: Chambeyronia macrocarpia
- Cocos: Cocos nucifera
- Copernicia
- Corypha: Corypha unbraculifera
- Cyrtostachys
- Dictyosperma
- Drymophloeus: Drymophloeus oliviformis
- Dypsis
- Elaeis: Elaeis guineensis
- Heterospathe
- Howea
- Hyophorbe
- Latania
- Licuala
- Livistona
- Nypa: Nypa fruticans
- Phoenicophorium
- Phoenix: Phoenix dactylifera
- Pinanga
- Pritchardia
- Pseudophoenix: Pseudophoenix sargentii
- Ptychosperma
- Ravenea: Ravenea glauca
- Rhapis: Rhapis excelsa
- Roystonea
- Sabal: Sabal palmetto
- Serenoa
- Syagrus
- Trachycarpus: Trachycarpus fortunei
- Trithrinax
- Veitchia
- Wallichia
- Washingtonia: Washingtonia filifera
- Wodyetia: Wodyetia bifurcata
