= Gunfoundry =

Cannonball factory

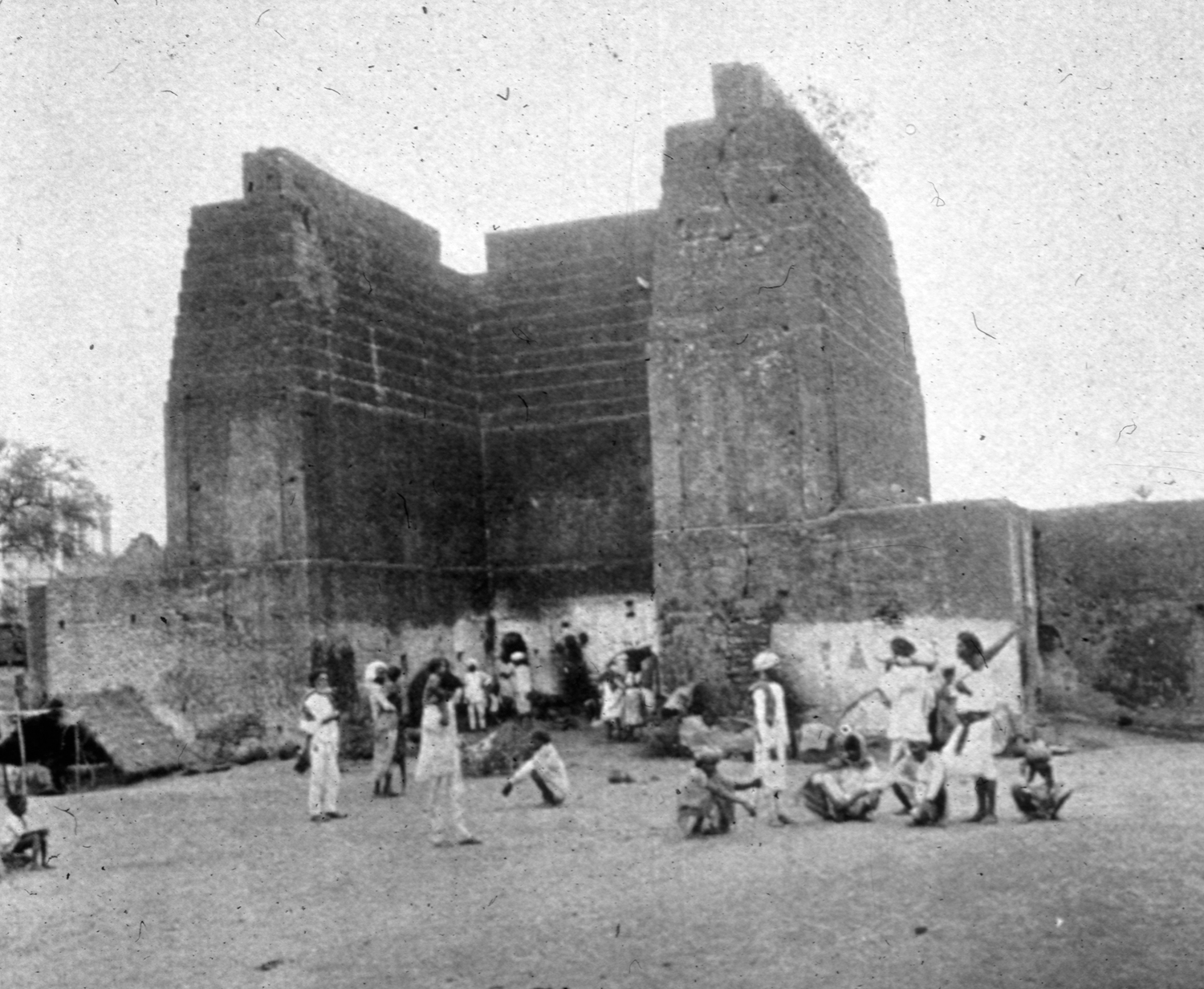

- Location within Hyderabad Location within Telangana Location within India

General information
- Architectural style: Mughal Cannon Architecture
- Location: Hyderabad, India
- Coordinates: 17°21′41″N 78°28′28″E
- Opened: 1785; 241 years ago

Height
- Height: 15 metres (49 ft)

Technical details
- Material: Brick

The Gunfoundry also known as Top ka Sancha (1785 AD) was a cannonball factory set up by the second Nizam of Hyderabad, Nawab Mir Nizam Ali Khan at Fateh Maidan in Hyderabad, India. The historic Aliya High School for Boys and Mehboobia College for Girls, both are opposite to Gunfoundry, across the main road that leads to Abids (in south).

== History ==
The Gunfoundry was one of the several cannon and cannonball factories set up in 1785 AD by French general Michel Raymond who was in the service of Nawab Mir Nizam Ali Khan, the second Nizam of Hyderabad. This is the only surviving gunfoundry established in the 18th century, in the Hyderabad State.

== Building Structure ==
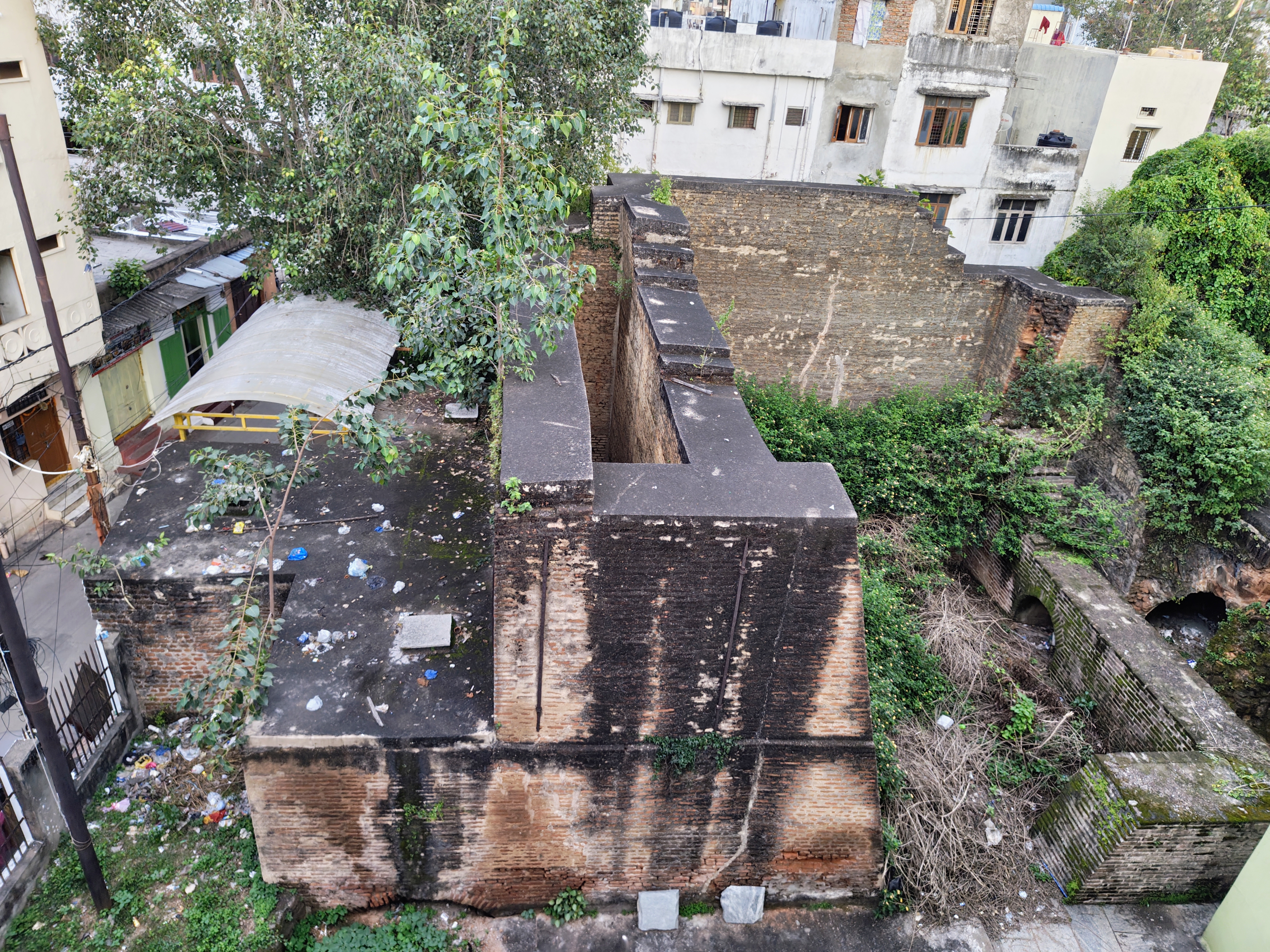
View of the Gunfoundry as on October 2025

The original brick walls of the Gunfoundry are approximately 50 feet (15 m) high with a tapered portion commencing above 25 feet. Due to poor maintenance, the tapered walls were reduced to 25 to 30 feet. The lower portion was plastered with lime. The shape of the bricks used in the construction of the structure is square with less thickness. The binding material used is lime mortar. The wall surfaces were covered with lime mortar on the exterior and interior. The walls have joints of square iron rods. In the lower portions, brick arches were made in semi-circular shape, where the smelting was carried out under the supervision of General Raymond.

== Authors words ==
Malcolm's History of India, referred to the foundry in 1798.
