= Raymond's Tomb =

Tomb of Michel Jocahim Marie Raymond

- Moosarambagh
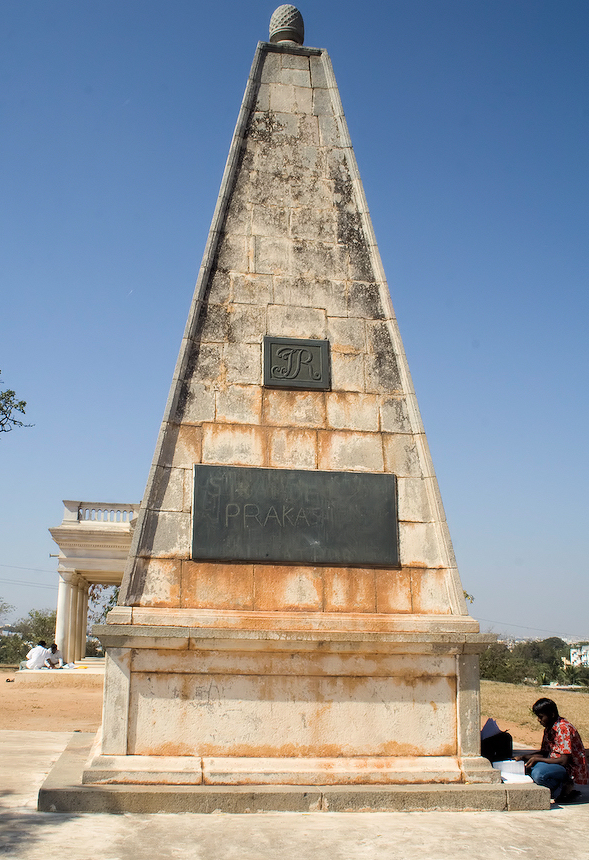
- Interactive map of Raymond's Tomb
- Location: Malakpet, Hyderabad
- Coordinates: 17°21′53.4″N 78°30′54.7″E
- Type: tomb
- Length: 60 metres (200 ft)
- Width: 30 metres (98 ft)
- Height: 8 metres (26 ft)
- Dedicated to: Michel Joachim Marie Raymond

Raymond's tomb is the tomb of Michel Joachim Marie Raymond, a French general in the army of the 2nd Nizam of Hyderabad State, Nizam Ali Khan, Asaf Jah II. The tomb, located today in Hyderabad, India is a black granite tombstone, conical, about 7 metres high and it has the initials JR on it. The pavilion was built by the Nizam and collapsed in October 2001 in heavy rain.

Sunset at Raymonds Tomb Hyderabad

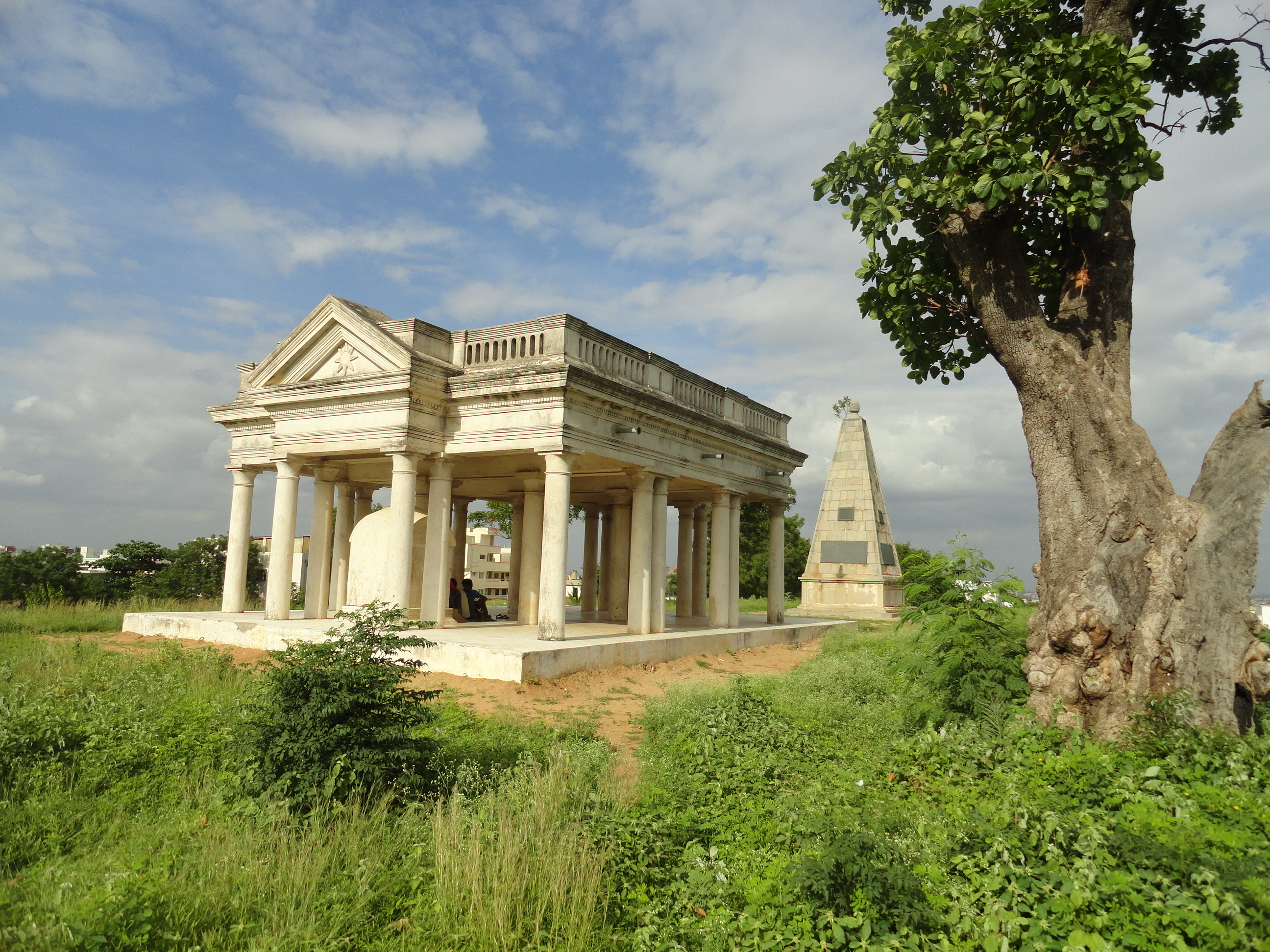
Monsieur Raymond's tomb at Moosarambagh, Hyderabad, India

== Location ==
The tomb is located near Asman Garh Palace on top of a hillock at Tirumala Hills, Malakpet, about 3 km from the Oliphant Bridge (currently known as Chaderghat Bridge), in East Hyderabad. Until about 1940, people would visit his tomb on the anniversary of his death, taking incense and other offerings to him. The Nizams would send to his tomb on 25 March every year, a box of cheroots and a bottle of beer. His grave had become like a shrine. He is also remembered in Hyderabad, with the area called Mussa Ram Bagh (Monsieur Raymond). This Obelisk also offers a beautiful view of the Old city of Hyderabad.

== Damage and restoration ==
The tomb has suffered a long period of neglect. During heavy rains in October 2001, the pavilion collapsed. It was rebuilt and the entire area was given a facelift. It was opened to public on 14 April 2003 this cost an estimated ₹ 500,000.
