= Yashoda Hospitals =

Indian multi-speciality hospital

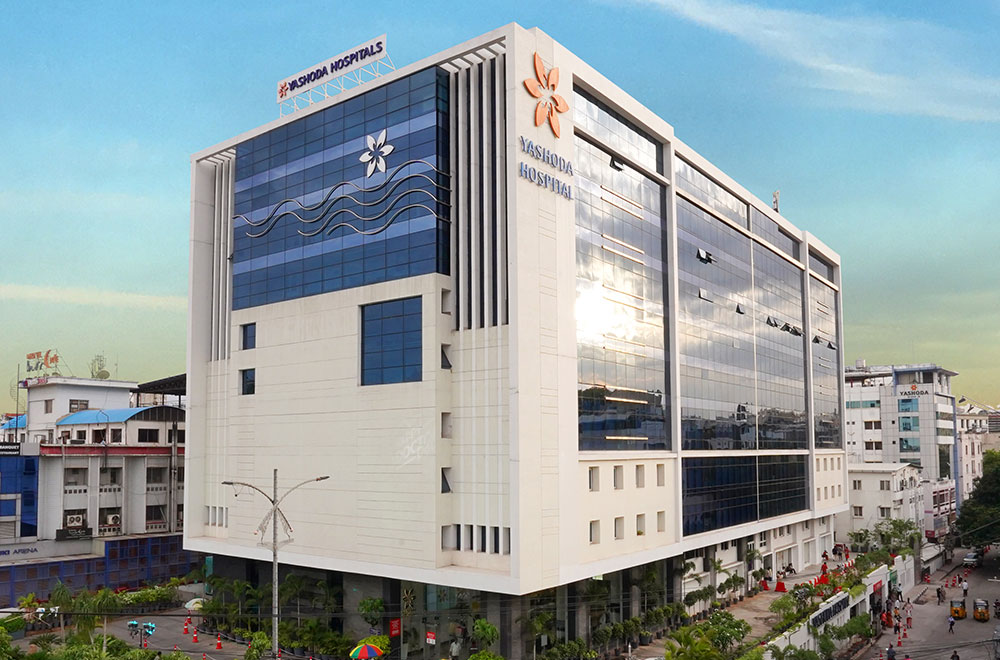

Geography
- Location: Hyderabad, India
- Coordinates: 17°25′44″N 78°27′19″E

Organisation
- Type: Private

History
- Opened: 1989; 37 years ago

Links
- Website: yashodahospitals.com

Yashoda Hospitals is a chain of hospitals based in Hyderabad, Telangana, India. It has branches in Somajiguda, Secunderabad, Malakpet, and in Hitec City. All of its branches are NABH and NABL accredited.

It was recognized as a leading hospital for oncology in 2015 after becoming the first hospital to achieve the milestone of treating 10,000 patients using RapidArc technology.⁣⁣

== History ==
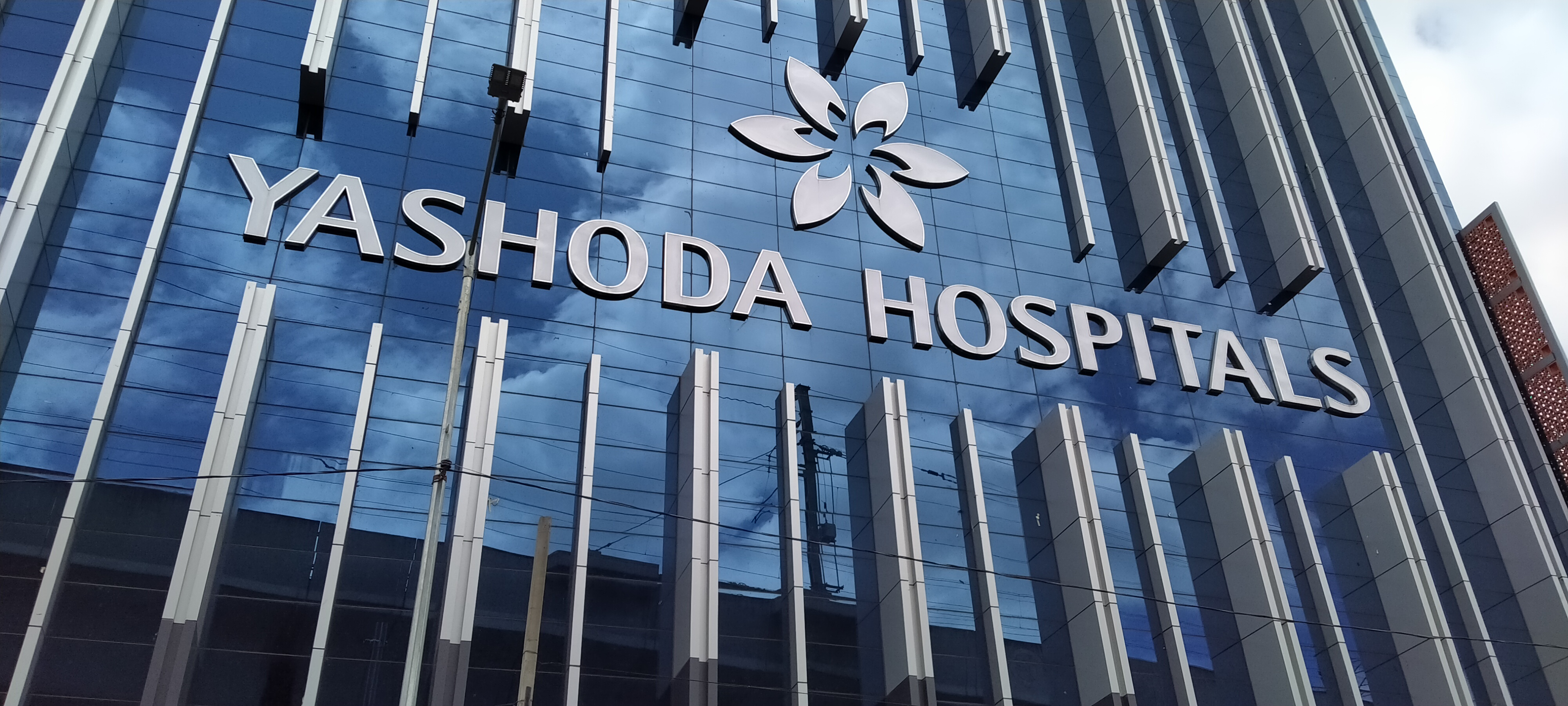
Yashoda Hospital in Malakpet

The hospital began as a small clinic in 1989 set up by Dr. G. Surendar Rao. He later teamed up with his brothers G. Devender Rao and G. Ravender Rao to expand operations and start Yashoda Hospitals. The clinic was originally started in Madipally village, Warangal District, Telangana. [7] Dr. Pavan Gorukanti Dr Abhinav Gorukanti operates as a director.

The hospital performed the first lung transplantation in the Telugu states in 2012. Archana Shedge, a 34-year-old from Pune suffering from interstitial fibrosis, underwent the life-saving surgery.

In 2017, Yashoda Hospitals performed the first combined heart and lung transplant in the Telugu states of Andhra Pradesh and Telangana. Doctors at Yashoda Group of hospitals regularly perform heart transplant surgeries supported by the Jeevandan scheme.

== Branches ==
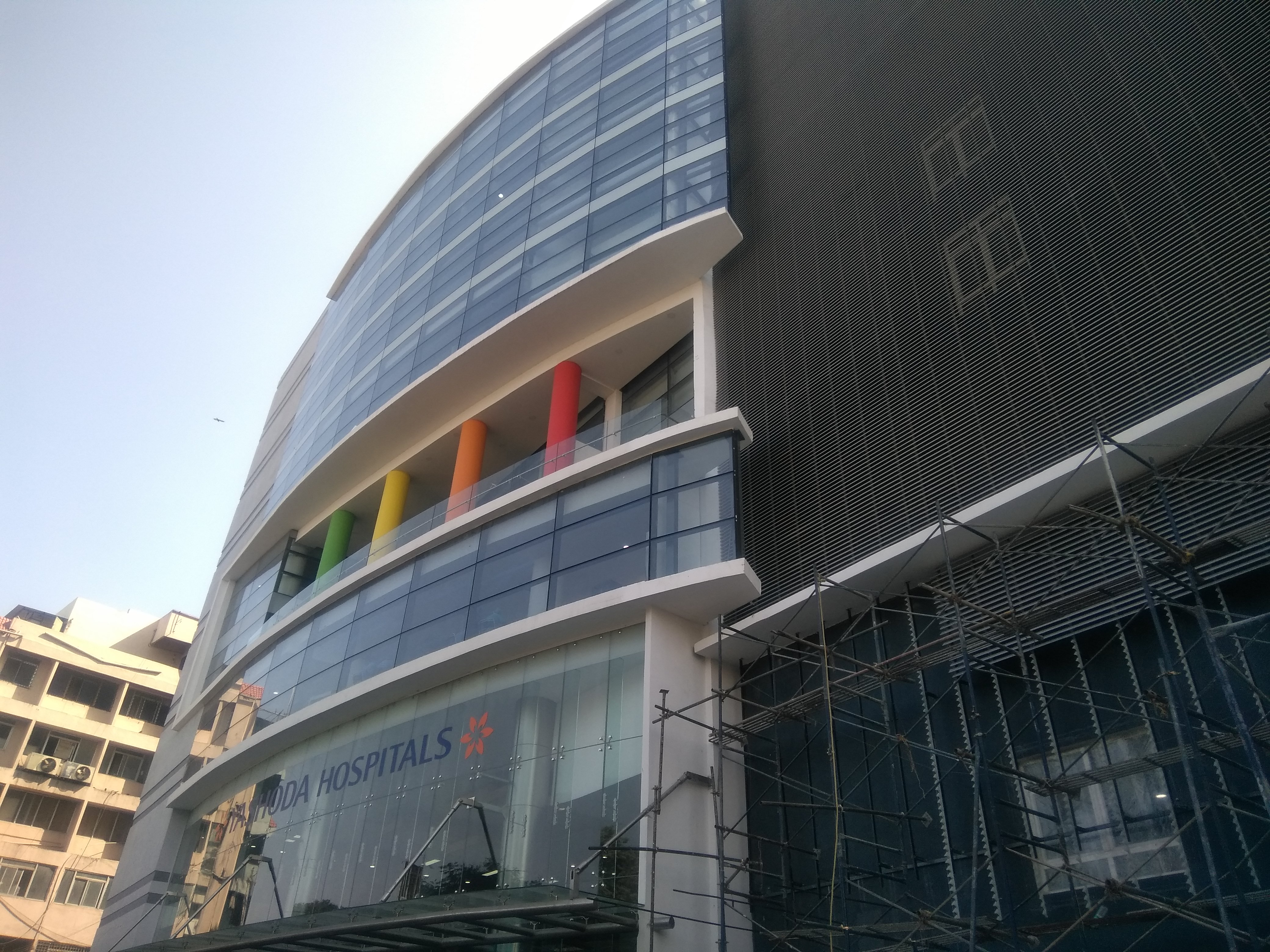
Yashoda Hospital in Secunderabad

The group has four branches in Hyderabad at Secunderabad, Malakpet, Somajiguda, and Hitec City with a combined bed capacity of 4000.

== Departments ==
Yashoda Group of Hospitals offers services in the following departments:

- Neurology & Neurosurgery
- Oncology
- Cardiology and cardio-thoracic surgery
- Cardiothoracic surgery
- Nephrology and Urology
- Center for organ transplant
- Orthopaedic
- Gynaecology
- Neonatology
- Pediatric surgery
- Pulmonology & Bronchoscopy
- Dermatology, Cosmetic & plastic surgery
- Radiology & imaging sciences
- Anesthesiology
- Pediatric Cardiology
- General medicine
- General surgery
- Orthopaedics
- Ear, nose and throat (ENT)
- Gastroenterology
- Paediatrics
- Bariatric Surgery
- Radiation Oncology
- Robotic Science
- Liver Transplant

== Yashoda Foundation ==
Yashoda Group of Hospitals launched Yashoda Foundation as a Corporate Social Responsibility (CSR) initiative. Over the years, it has been actively involved in helping orphans, raising awareness regarding diseases, and providing experiential learning for students aspiring to be doctors among others.

The foundation began working with orphans in 2011 and enables them to earn a livelihood. This is done by providing free vocational courses and counselling. After the training, the youth are given a job at Yashoda Hospitals.
