= Aza Khane Zehra =

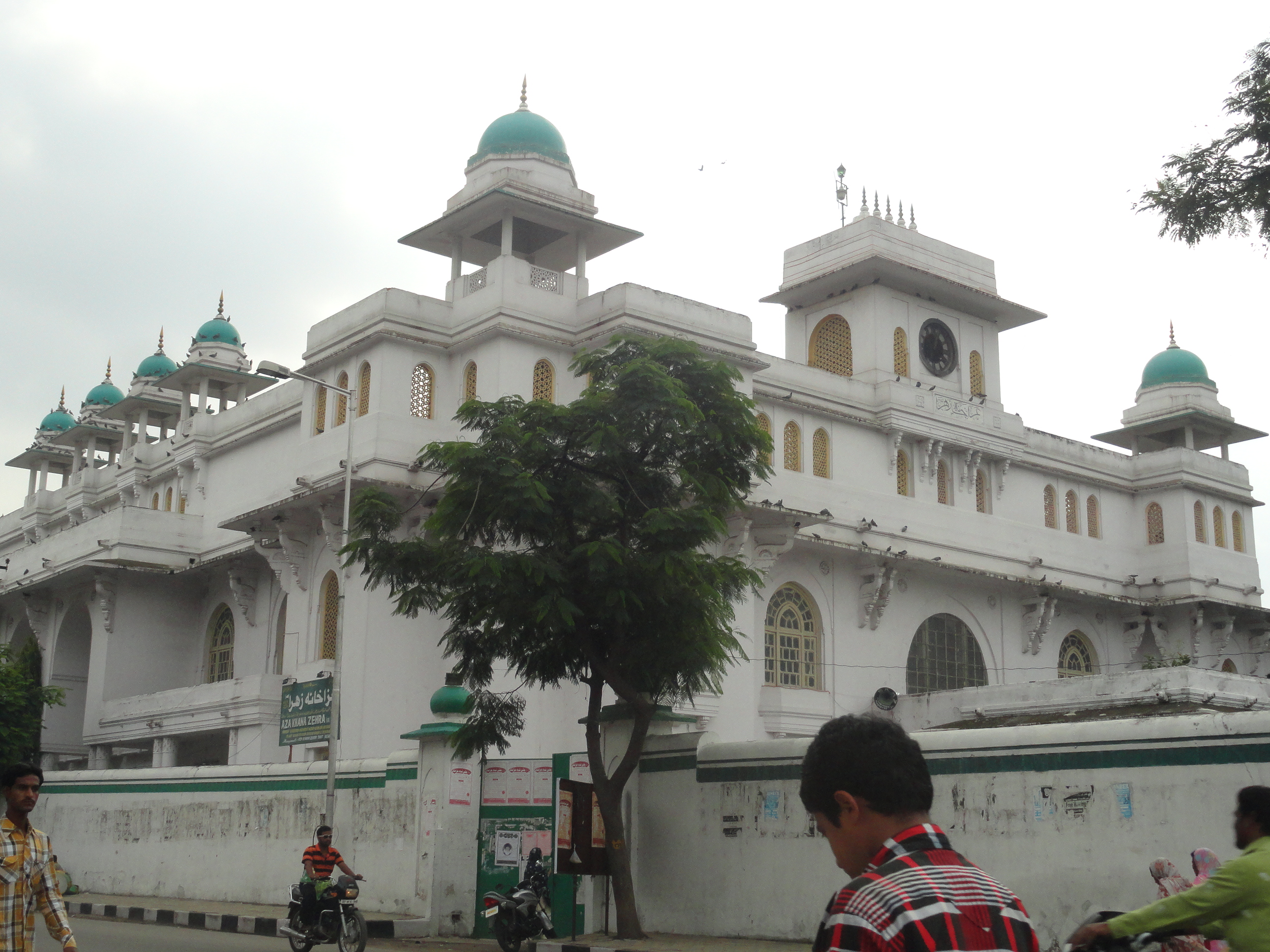
- Interactive map of Aza Khane Zehra
- 17.372754°N 78.482542°E
- Location: Hyderabad, India

History
- Built: 1930

Site notes
- Area: 4,500 sq yds
- Architect: Zain Yar Jung
- Architectural style: Indo-Saracenic style (Osmanian Style)

Aza Khane Zehra is an ashurkhana built by the last Nizam of Hyderabad, Mir Osman Ali Khan in memory of his mother Zehra Begum. It was constructed in the 1930s and is located on the banks of Musi river right next to Salar Jung Museum in Darulshifa, Hyderabad. It is busy during Moharram. It was built in a style known as Osmanian Architecture.

== History ==
The Last Nizam was very fond of his mother "Amtul Zehra Begum", he built this monument after her death in her memory. It is the largest Ashurkhana in the whole of South India.

This Ashurkhana is also known as "Madar-e-Deccan Ashurkhana" - meaning "Ashurkhana of Mother of the Deccan", wherein Zehra Begum being revered as "Mother of the Deccan"

Every year, the Ayyam-e-Fatmiyyah Majlis is held over three days in remembrance of the beloved daughter of Prophet Muhammad, Fatima al-Zahra. This annual religious gathering is organized by the sons of the late Syed Raza Ali Hashim Moosavi.

== Architecture ==
(The design of the monument was drafted by Zain Yar Jung (Zainuddin Husain Khan). It can accommodate 25,000 people at a time. The walls and ceiling of the hall is covered with intricate-enamel work which depict verses from the Quran and sayings on family of Muhammad and Ali.

It has a 45 feet high ceiling. It also won the "HUDA - INTACH Heritage Award" in the year 1999.

== See also ==
- Nizams of Hyderabad
- Establishments of the Nizams
