= Mahbub Mansion =

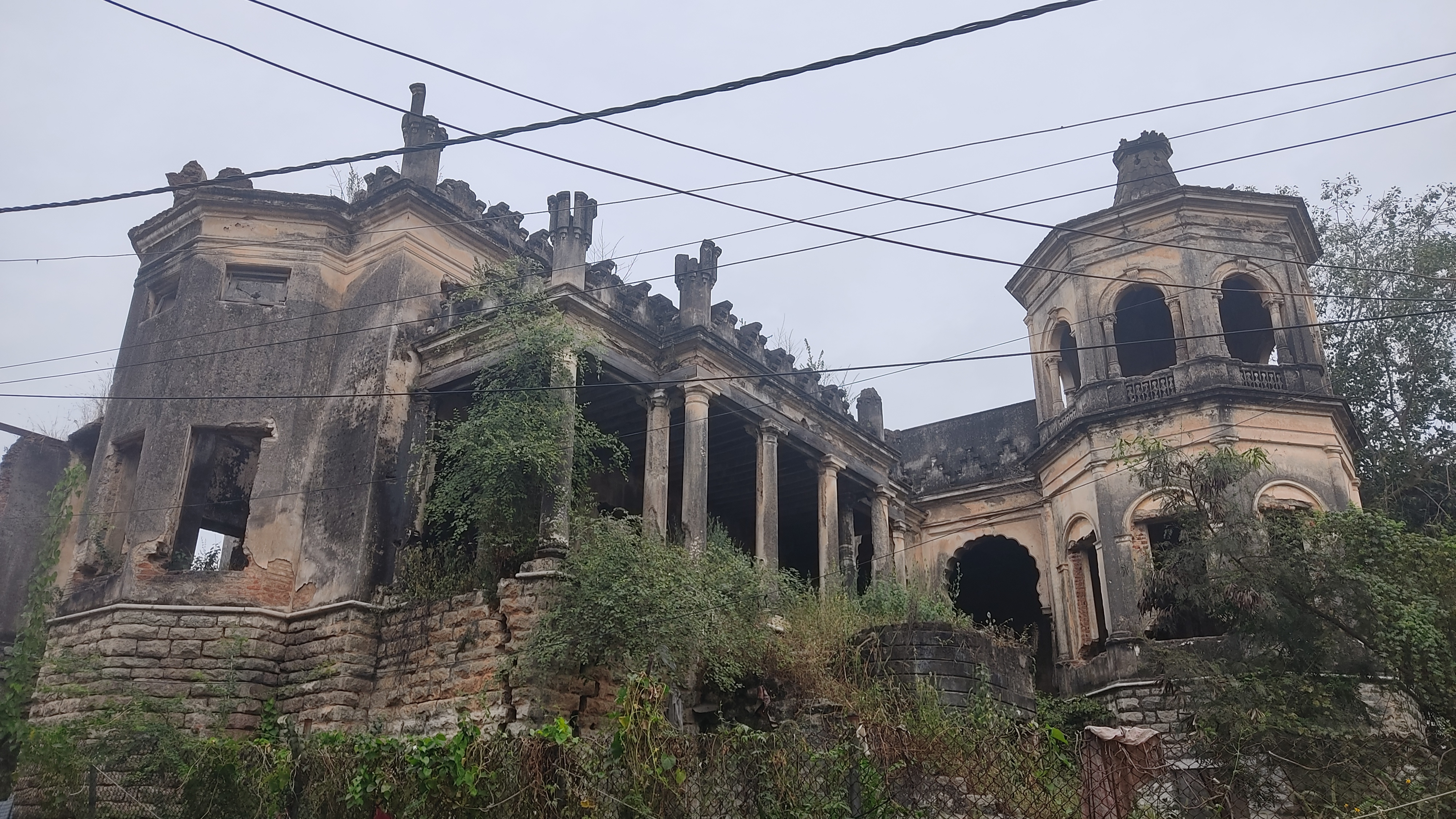

- Location within Hyderabad Location within Telangana Location within India
- Etymology: Asaf Jah VI, Mir Mahbub Ali Khan

General information
- Type: Royal Palace
- Location: Malakpet, Hyderabad, Telangana, India
- Coordinates: 17.37619771045909°N 78.50554775295524°E
- Opened: 1902; 124 years ago
- Owner: Nizam of Hyderabad

Mahbub Mansion, also spelt Mahboob Mansion is a palace, named after Mir Mahbub Ali Khan, Asaf Jah VI, the sixth Nizam of Hyderabad State, who loved visiting here occasionally, though his permanent residence was the Purani Haveli. It is located in the Malakpet area of Hyderabad.

== History ==
Built in the late 19th century, this is a large palace in the architecture of classical European and Mughal style. It is similar to the eastern blocks of Mubarak Mansion Nazri Bagh of King Kothi Palace.

It was acquired by the Nizam in the 19th century.

=== Trivia ===
Sardar Begum, a consort of Asaf Jah VI, was fond of watching horse races and used to watch them from the mansion amidst curtains made of gold thread. The sunlight reflected off the gold curtains made it impossible for anyone to look toward the queen, as per purdah.

== Present day ==
In 1983, the spices market of Osman Gunj was officially shifted to the open land on Mahbub mansion.

The palace is abandoned and in very poor condition, completely neglected by the Government of India whereas, palace land has been entirely taken over by housing and commercial developments.

== See also ==
- Nizam of Hyderabad
- Mahbub Ali Khan, Asaf Jah VI
