= Saidabad =

- Mandal
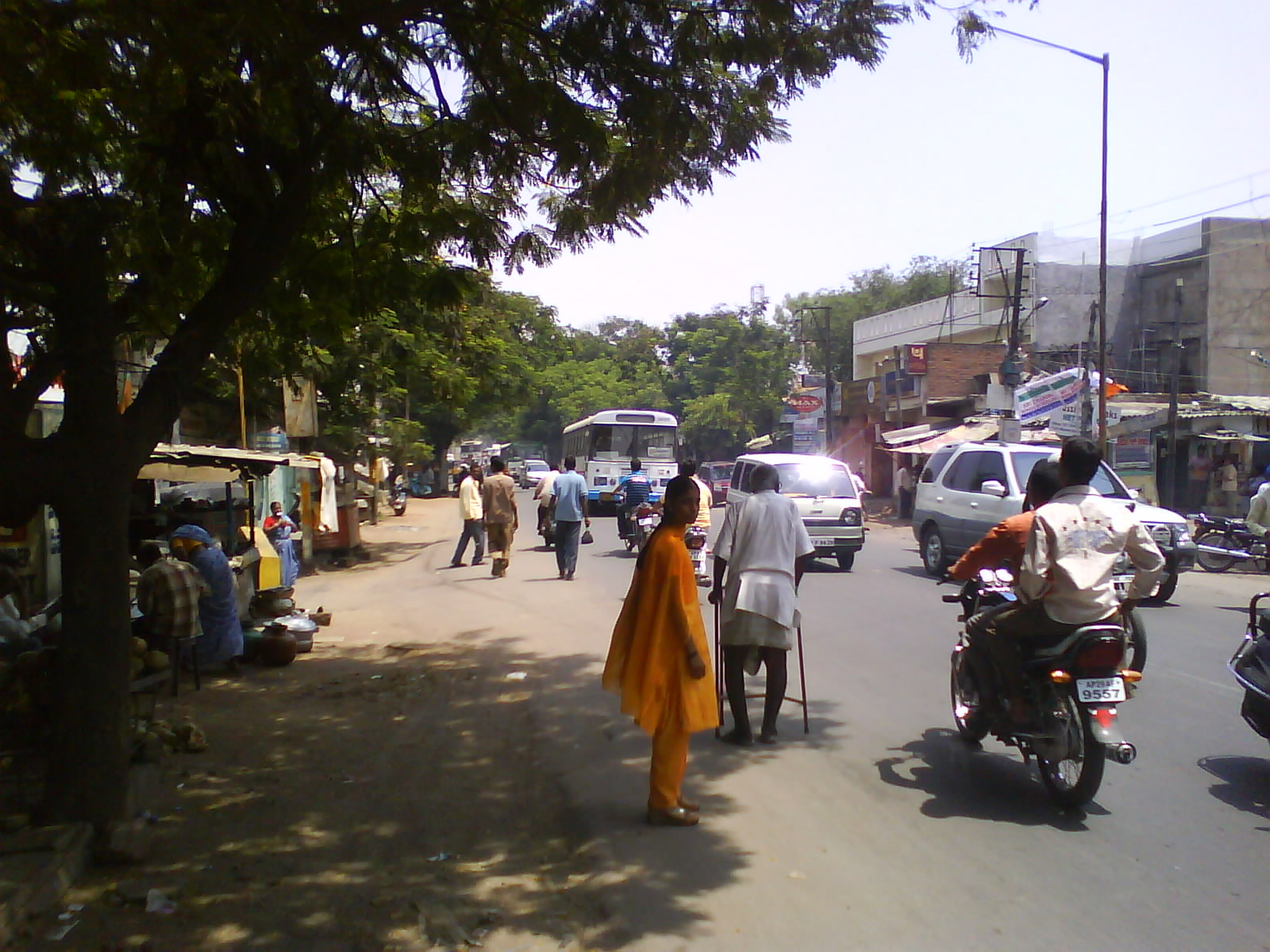
- Saidabad Main Road

- Location in Hyderabad, India Saidabad (India)
- Coordinates: 17.3563°N 78.5116°E
- State: Telangana
- Metro: Hyderabad Metropolitan Region
- Zone: South Zone
- Ward: 19

Government
  - Body: GHMC

Area
  - Total: 6.59 km^{2} (2.54 sq mi)

Population (2020)
  - Total: 119,305
  - Density: 18,098/km^{2} (46,870/sq mi)

Languages
  - Official: Urdu, Telugu
- Time zone: UTC+5:30 (IST)
- PIN: 500059
- Lok Sabha constituency: Hyderabad
- Vidhan Sabha constituency: Malakpet Assembly constituency
- Planning agency: GHMC
- Civic agency: GHMC

Saidabad is a mandal in Hyderabad District in Telangana, India.

== Transport ==
Saidabad is named after Syed Mir Mommin, the Prime Minister of Golconda, in 1591. Some nawabs had big mansions here. One such is Ameen Manzil, a historic structure named after Sir Ahmed Hussaini-Nawab Ameen Jung who was a member of the Executive Council of Hyderabad State. "In 1969 there was a garden known as Samad Bagh in the area which had two large wells (Mota Bavi). Even now some part of the garden exists which houses a heritage mansion.”

The local train station for MMTS trains is the Dabirpura Station, located behind the Chanchalguda Central Jail.

The nearest Metro station to Saidabad, is the Moosarambagh Metro Station, at Musarambagh.

It is well-connected by TSRTC buses, which ply on two routes covering most of the area, and all the buses stop here.
