= Chanchalguda =

- Old City
- Location in Telangana, India Chanchalguda (India)
- Coordinates: 17°22′9″N 78°29′48″E
- Country: India
- State: Telangana
- District: Hyderabad
- Metro: Hyderabad

Government
  - Body: GHMC

Languages
  - Official: Telugu, Urdu
- Time zone: UTC+5:30 (IST)
- PIN: 500024
- Vehicle registration: TG
- Lok Sabha constituency: Hyderabad
- Vidhan Sabha constituency: Malakpet
- Planning agency: GHMC
- Website: telangana.gov.in

Chanchalguda is a neighbourhood in Old City, Hyderabad. It is located near Saidabad and Dabirpura. The Chanchalguda Central Jail is located here.

== Transport ==
Chanchalguda is connected by buses run by TSRTC. Buses that run are 98, connecting to Nampally, and 78, connecting to Charminar. But 78 number service has been discontinued. Uber service and autos are easily available.

The closest MMTS train stations are at Dabirpura and Malakpet.

== Culture ==
The major festivals celebarated here are Eid ul fitr ,Eid ul Adha. Historic personalities of Chanchalguda include Subedar Ameer Ali Khan who helped hundreds of people secure pensions after Nizam Rule. His contributions were recognized and town of Ameerpet is named after him. In addition, there is Subedar Ameer Ali Khan Road named after him near Dabeerpura flyover. His son Chief Justice Sardar Ali Khan Barrister became High court judge of Andhra Pradesh and was minority chairperson with congress government for all India.

Other notable personalities with links to Chanchalguda was MIM founder Nawab Bahadur Yar Jung who was freedom fighter admired by Gandhi and Jinnah, an eloquent speaker. Other notable figures include Dr Bahadur world renowned surgeon whose name was announced in BBC Radio and Amanullah Khan former MLA and founder of MBT and poet Taleb Khudmiri, Professor Dr Sandozai, Osmania medical college instructor and renowned pathologist of Hyderabad. Other stellar personalities of Chanchalguda include Humanitarian Azhar Maqsusi who runs an NGO which says hunger has no religion (Hosted by Salman Khan and Amitabh Bachan on their shows) and renowned Gynecologist Dr Sultana Khan who was former head of Gynecology department of entire nation of Sultanate of Oman. It also is the residence of Sr Engineer Mohammed Abdul Muqeet based in California and working in innovative medical device industry. In addition, the small town has one of the largest diasporas in Chicago land area.

== Schools ==
Education was scarce in Muslim girls, Azeeza Khatoon founded Rahmathia Girls High School for girls with poor economic background with support from her father Subedar Ameer Ali Khan. This school provided opportunity to poor girls who had no chance towards education and uplifted lives of many poor individuals through education. Schools in the area include the popular Chanchalguda Government Junior College, Modern High School, Farah High School, Rehmatia High School, St. Lawrence High School, Caramel High School and Neo School Aizza. In addition, their Nawab Shah Alam college for higher education.
