= Madipally =

- village/mandal
- Location in Telangana, India Madipally (India)
- Coordinates: 17.5857°N 79.6578°E
- Country: India
- State: telangana
- District: Mahabubabad
- Elevation: 302 m (991 ft)

Population
  - Total: 5,000

Languages
  - Official: Telugu
- Time zone: UTC+5:30 (IST)
- PIN: 506163
- Telephone code: 08719

Madipally is a village in the Mahabubabad district of the Indian state of Telangana. It is 6 km from Thorrur, which is about 60 km from Warangal. It is 125 km from Hyderabad. The village is said to be nearly 400-year-old.

In April 2017, Kakatiya Urban Development Authority (KUDA) chairman Marri Yadav Reddy announced that a mega township would be developed on 180 acres of land at Madipally. In 2016, a proposed Hyderabad Public School was shifted from Madipally to Elkurthi.

== Sub villages in Madipally ==
- Somavaram Kunta Thanda
- Chowlla Thanda
- Pilligundla Thanda
- Kotagani thanda

== Wells ==
Chelama is the oldest well in the village, dug approximately 200 years ago. Although Madipally is connected to municipal water through pipeline, villagers prefer well water for drinking as they consider it as pure. It is said that villagers take at least two pots of water from this well each day. The base of the well is a huge stone which the villagers are unwilling to remove for fear of disturbing the water.

The stone is feared to increase the chances of water contamination. Despite the stone at the base of the well, it has never run dry.

== Buruju ==
Buruju is a building almost 400 years old. It is used to store weapons with protection in front. Visitors reach the top via stairs. It belongs to Vatte Mahesh Chander Reddy

== Festival ==
Villagers celebrate the Dussera festival in front of Gadi Maisamma (goddess). It celebrates from oldest tradition from Golgonda dynasty and Nizams title deshmukhs Gadis

Vatte Mahesh Chander Reddy Gadi In this festival The villagers are gives Bali of Male sheep.

== School ==
Madipally children have access to primary education from a school in the village. The school's building walls have the Indian map painted on them as well as Indian national leaders' photos.

== Village presidents ==
The following people have served as the sarpanch to Madipally village:

- 1.Laxminarsaiah
- 2.Lacchi Reddy
- 3.Veera Reddy
- 4.Narayana
- 5.Venket Reddy
- 6.Kishore Reddy
- 7.Mangya Naik
- 8.Mahesh
- 9.Madhavi
- 10.Verpula Anjali

== Village MPTCS ==
- Nalamasa Uppalaiah
- Dharavat Laxmi
- Mandula Muthayalamma
- Jakka Mahibub reddy
- Thurpati Chinna Anjaiah

== Economy ==
Agriculture is the primary occupation. Residents cultivate rice, corn, turmeric, cotton and tamarind, mirchi.

The water facility is insufficient. No freshwater lake is available for irrigation. The well it is not suitable. Four types of lands exist in the village:

- Ragadi (more fertile)
- Errachekka (moderate fertile)
- Telle dhubba (less fertile)
- Savuda Nella (infertile)
