= Chanchalguda Central Jail =

Jail in Hyderabad, Telangana, India

- Interactive map of Chanchalguda Central Jail
- Location: Hyderabad, India; 17.365742°N 78.500068°E
- Status: Open
- Security class: Maximum
- Capacity: 1000
- Opened: 1876

Chanchalguda Central Jail, located in Hyderabad, Telangana, India, is one of the oldest jails in the country. The jail is in the old city of Hyderabad at Chanchalguda. It was constructed during the reign of the Nizam of the Hyderabad State, and remains operational today.

The jail has an official capacity of 1000 inmates, but is said to be overcrowded, with inmate numbers having recently come to exceed 1,600. An average of 40 new inmates arrive at the jail daily. In 2012, renovations began to update the amenities and expand the occupancy of the jail. Following the introduction of an adult literacy programme, Chanchalguda Central Jail reported a 100% literacy rate from 1989 to 1990.

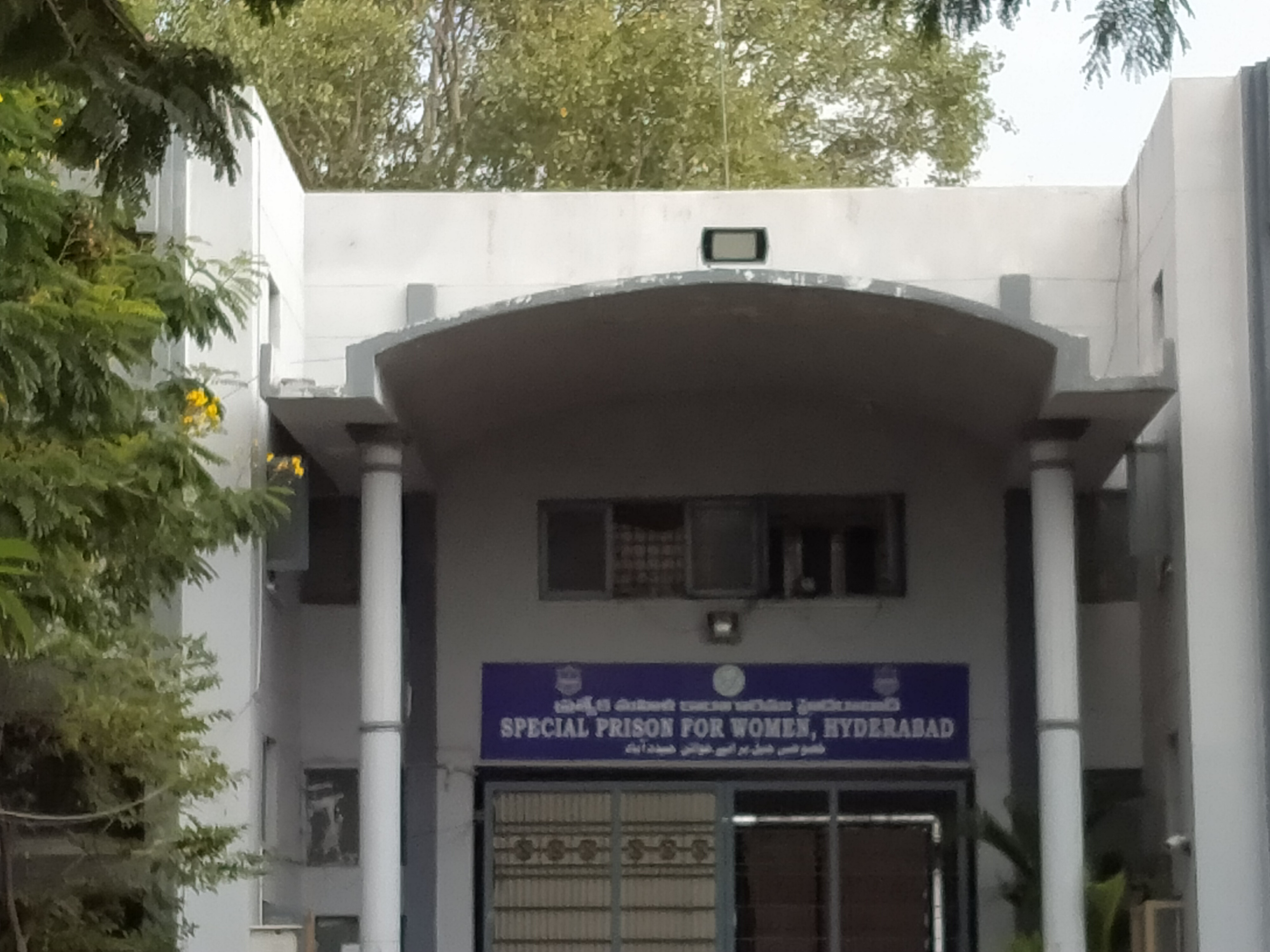
Women's prison, Chanchalguda

== History ==
Chanchalguda Central Jail was founded in 1876 under the Nizam of Hyderabad, with British oversight, to serve as a key prison in the princely state. Hyderabad, a major center under Asaf Jahi rule, needed a secure facility for political dissenters and criminals, and the jail was built in Chanchalguda, then a quieter suburb. Its construction came amid British efforts to standardize prison systems across India, influenced by the 1838 Prison Discipline Committee's push for reform. The jail's early role was grim, it held freedom fighters opposing British and Nizam rule, including activists from the 1930s Telangana Rebellion. After India's independence in 1947 and Hyderabad's integration in 1948, the jail transitioned to state control, becoming a central facility in Andhra Pradesh and later Telangana.

== Economics ==
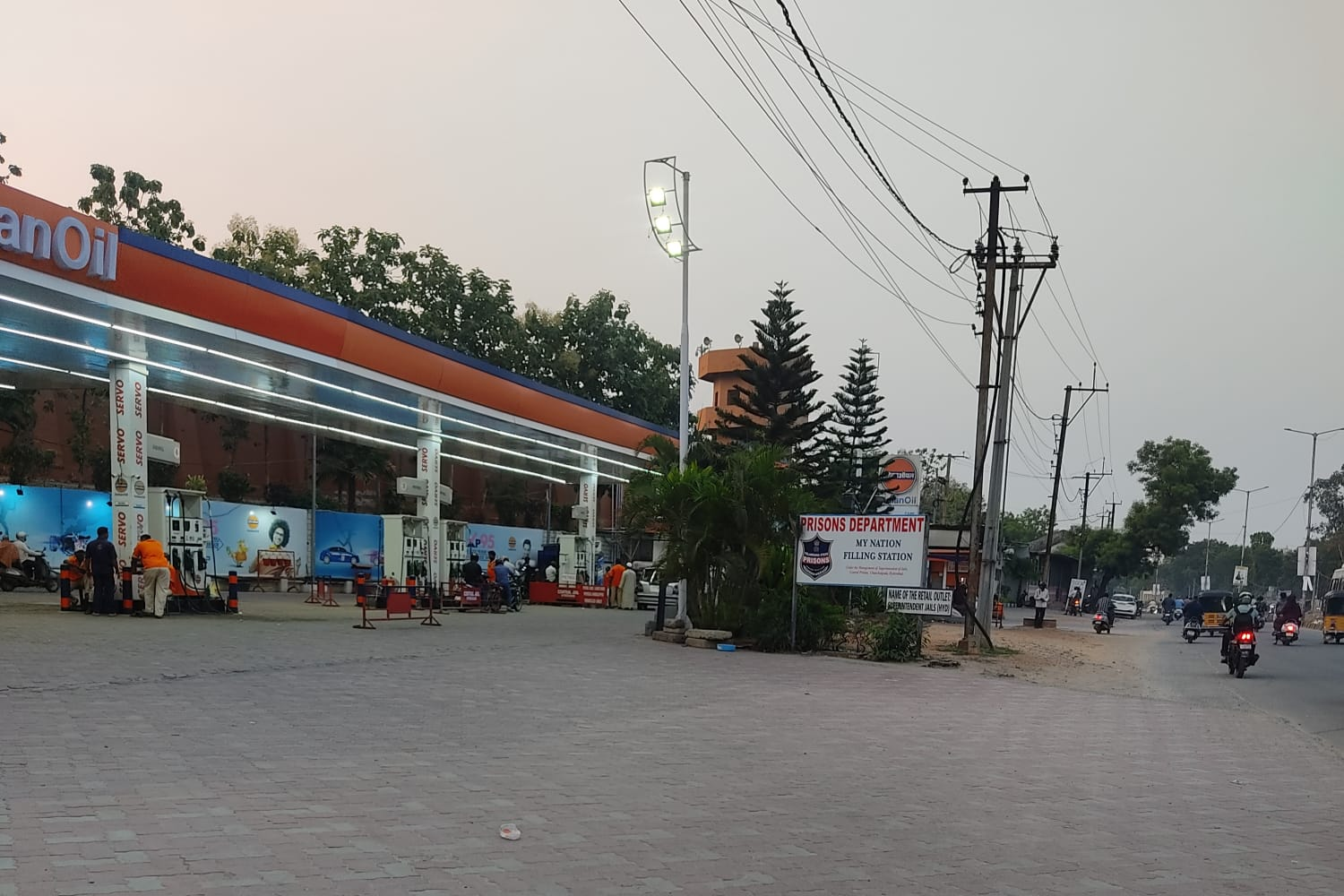
Petrol pump adjoining the prison. The guard tower of the prison is seen in the background

A petrol pump staffed by inmates is located adjoining the jail. The annual turnover of the petrol pump is over ₹100 crore as of 2017. Apart from this, there is also a restaurant staffed by inmates and a store which sells handloom products made by the inmates, including bedsheets and towels.

== Notable Inmates ==
The jail has housed significant figures:

- Freedom Fighters: During the 1930s–1940s, it held Telangana Rebellion activists opposing Nizam rule, including leaders like Doddi Komaraiah.
- Y. S. Jagan Mohan Reddy: The YSR Congress Party leader was detained in 2012–2013 on corruption charges, drawing media attention.
- MIM Leaders: In 2012, MLAs Akbaruddin and Asaduddin Owaisi faced brief detention over protest-related charges.
- Satyam Scam Accused: Ramalinga Raju, founder of Satyam Computers, was held in 2009 for financial fraud.
