= Dar-ul-Shifa =

Inner city in Telangana, India

Dar-ul-Shifa house of health
- neighbourhood
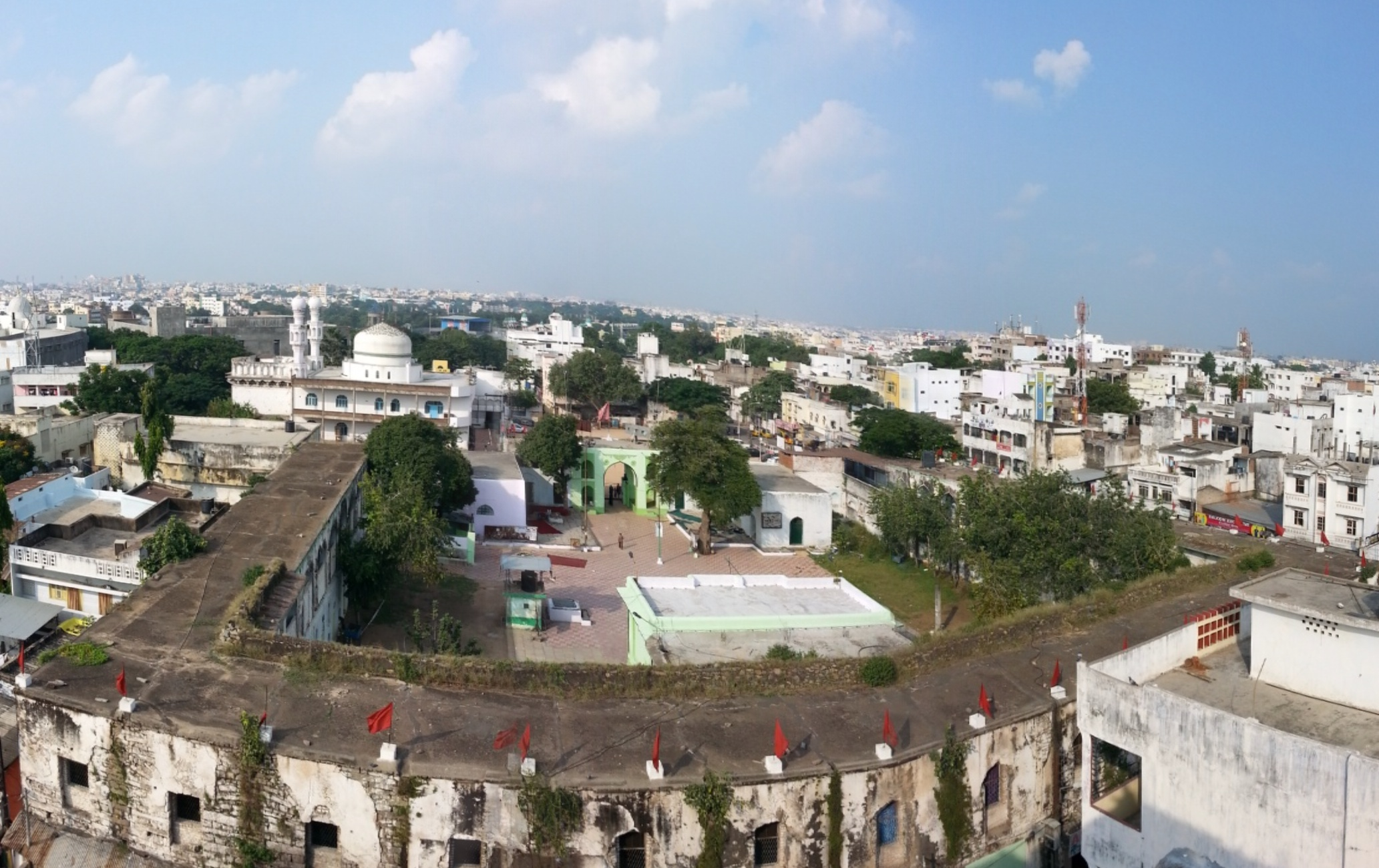

- Location in Hyderabad, Telangana, India Dar-ul-Shifa (Telangana) Dar-ul-Shifa (India)
- Coordinates: 17.3702657°N 78.481669°E
- Country: India
- State: Telangana
- District: Hyderabad
- Metro: Hyderabad
- Established: 1591; 435 years ago
- Founded by: Muhammad Quli Qutb Shah
- Named after: The hospital built here in 1591; 435 years ago

Government
  - Body: GHMC

Languages
  - Official: Telugu, Urdu
- Time zone: UTC+5:30 (IST)
- PIN: 500024
- Lok Sabha constituency: Hyderabad
- Vidhan Sabha constituency: Charminar
- Planning agency: GHMC

Dar-ul-Shifa is a neighbourhood in the Old City of Hyderabad, India, named after the 16th-century hospital it once housed. The location was founded in AD 1591, more than 400 years ago, by Mohammed Quli Qutub Shah, the founder of Hyderabad city. Today it houses a large population of Shia Muslims and comes alive on the days of Muharram and Shia festivals. Most of the households have family members settled abroad, whose remittances increase the quality of life.

In Arabic, and derived from it in Urdu, Turkish and Persian, dar al-shifa means "house of health", i.e. "hospital". The name of the location is derived from the fact that initially the area was popularly known for its hospital. Dar-ul-Shifa Hospital and Jama Masjid were built in the same period as the Charminar monument-cum-mosque and the huge Makkah Masjid (Mecca Mosque).

Geographically, Dar-ul-Shifa lies in the south of Hyderabad city, on the banks of River Musi. It lies under the Charminar Assembly Constituency. Historically it is one of the old urban areas of Hyderabad; now it is part of the Old City of Hyderabad.

== History ==
The area got this name for the hospital built by Sultan Mohammed Quli Qutub Shah over 400 years ago. Later, during the rule of the Nizams, the hospital was moved to another building due to space constraints and the old building was converted into a Hussainia called Alawa e-Sartouq. The alam is made of part of the sartouq, a metal headgear with spikes, which the fourth Shia Imam Ali ibn Husayn Zayn al-Abidin had to put on after being captured by Yazid I's forces along with the Ahl al-Bayt women. This Hussainia can be visited anytime throughout the year. Currently this building is under H.E.H. the Nizam's Charitable Trust.

== Boundaries of Dar-ul-Shifa ==
Dar-ul-Shifa is surrounded by the Musi River, Noorkhan Bazar, Dabeerpura, Purani Haveli and Chatta Bazaar.

Dar-ul-Shifa starts from the new Bridge Mosque, also known as Naya Pul, and the suburbs start from the Masjid Haji Kamal and on the other side Aza Khane Zehra, which was built by HEH, the 7th Nizam-Mir Osman Ali Khan.

== Development and landmarks ==
Dar-ul-Shifa is one of the oldest urban areas of Hyderabad city and was developed in the Nizam's period with the extension of Jama Masjid, now beautifully renewed, with a market around the area of the mosque. Here is also a good selection of shops and restaurants.

There are two famous orphanages, namely Dar-ul-Yatama and Zehra boys, which dal under for Shia community charitable hostels.

Until the 1980s, the Hyderabad Municipal Corporation head office was located in Dar-ul-Shifa. Currently it is serving as Quli Qutub Shahi Urban Development Authority (QQSUDA) head office.

== Transport ==
Dar-ul-Shifa is connected by buses run by TSRTC. All the RTC buses which head towards Charminar are routed through Dar-ul-Shifa.

The closest MMTS train station is at Dabeerpura. The nearest metro station is MGBS metro station

== Fire incident at QQSUDA ==
On May 7, 2019, a fire broke out at the Quli Qutub Shahi Urban Development Authority in Dar-ul-Shifa. The fire, which broke out at around 4 pm on Monday, started at the record room that is on the first floor of the GHMC-owned building. The fire officials found it difficult to control the fire due to the poor condition of the building. After nearly four hours, the fire was contained.
