= Ahmed bin Abdullah Balala =

Indian politician

Member of Legislative Assembly, Telangana
- Incumbent
- Assumed office 2014
- Preceded by: Telangana Assembly Created
- Constituency: Malakpet

Member of Legislative Assembly Andhra Pradesh
- In office 2009–2014
- Preceded by: Malreddy Ranga Reddy
- Succeeded by: Telangana Assembly Created
- Constituency: Malakpet

Personal details
- Born: 22 October 1967 (age 58) Hyderabad, Telangana, India
- Party: All India Majlis-e-Ittehadul Muslimeen
- Parent: Abdullah bin Ahmed Balala
- Education: St. Paul's High School, Hyderabad
- Occupation: Politician

Ahmed Balala bin Abdullah Balala is an Indian politician from the city of Hyderabad. He represents the Malakpet constituency in the Telangana Legislative Assembly on an All India Majlis-e-Ittehadul Muslimeen seat. He first won the seat in 2009 and retained it in the 2014,2018 and 2023 polls.

== Career ==
Balala won from the Malakpet constituency in 2009 by defeating Muhammad Muzaffar Ali Khan of Telugu Desam Party on an All India Majlis-e-Ittehadul Muslimeen ticket. Previously his party unsuccessfully contested the seat in 1989 and 1994. In December 2011, when officials of the Archaeological Survey of India tried to demolish the shops and encroachments around the Badshahi Ashurkhana, Balala and Syed Ahmed Pasha Quadri, and other supporters of AIMIM MLA, prevented them from doing so, leading to tensions in the city.

In 2014, Balala campaigned for the party in the Maharasthra Assembly Polls. After the results were declared, in which his party won two seats, Balala said that the reason for their success was because of the injustice done to Muslims. In April of the same year, he was renominated by the party for the same Malakpet seat in the Telegana Legislative Assembly polls. He emerged victorious by defeating Venkat Rao of the Bharatiya Janata Party by 23,000 votes.

In the zero hour of the Legislative Assembly of March 2016, Balala urged the government to relax the helmet rules for motorcyclists due to the high temperature of the summer months. He said that the "helmets further increase the heat for riders".

He won in 2018 elections for the third time.

He won again in 2023 election for the fourth time.
