= Moosarambagh =

- Neighbourhood
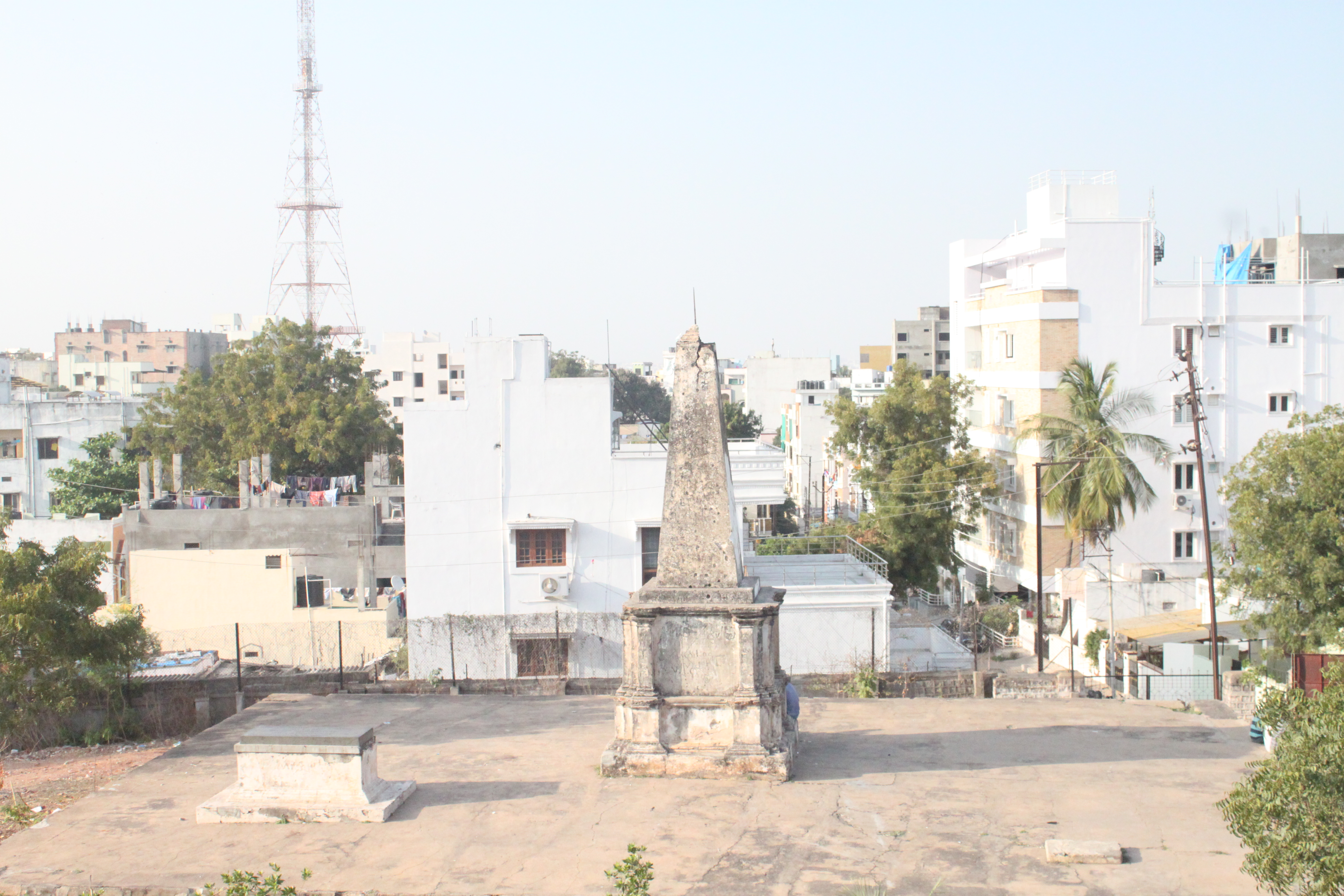
- Moosarambagh with Raymond's Tomb in the foreground

- Location in Telangana, India Moosarambagh (Telangana) Moosarambagh (India)
- Coordinates: 17.3730°N 78.5164°E
- Country: India
- State: Telangana
- District: Hyderabad
- Metro: Hyderabad
- Named for: Michel Joachim Marie Raymond

Government
  - Body: GHMC

Languages
  - Official: Telugu
- Time zone: UTC+5:30 (IST)
- PIN: 500 036
- Vehicle registration: TS
- Lok Sabha constituency: Hyderabad
- Vidhan Sabha constituency: Malakpet
- Planning agency: GHMC
- Website: telangana.gov.in

Moosrambagh also Moosa Ram Bagh is an old suburb of Hyderabad, Telangana, India. It is named after the French military commander Monsieur Raymond who served the Nizams of the Hyderabad state during the 18th century. His tomb, Raymond's Tomb, is located near Asman Garh Palace. The locality of "Moosa-Ram-Bagh" is named after him. Wherein, Bagh refers to "a garden" as the area was once covered by extensive greenery.

== History ==
Raymond became a close friend of the second Asaf Jah, Nizam Ali Khan. Raymond was not only held in high esteem by the 2nd Nizam, but had also won the love and trust of the local people. He made himself popular through his kindness, bravery and contribution to Hyderabad. To the Muslims, he was Musa Rahim, and to the Hindus, he was Musa Ram.

George Bruce Malleson said that "No European of mark who followed him in India, ever succeeded in gaining to such an extent the love, the esteem, the admiration of the natives of the country."

== Commercial area ==
Moosrambagh has many shops catering to all the needs of its residents. The popular Hyderabadi restaurants Capital (a.k.a. Shaam) and Bawarchi are located here. The suburb also has Doordarshan's TV tower.

== IT tower ==
On 2 October 2023, BRS Working President, Minister for Municipal Administration & Urban Development, Industries and IT&C K. T. Rama Rao laid the foundation stone of the 30-floor Malakpet IT tower- iTek Nucleus in Moosarambagh area. The IT tower will span 11 acres with a built-up space of 15 lakh sqft with a cost of Rs. 701 crores and will create 50,000 direct and indirect jobs. IT Tower is set to be completed in 36 months. The IT tower will be near the Musarambagh metro station.

== Transport ==
The state-owned TSRTC runs the city bus service, connecting to all the major centres of the city. There is also a Hyderabad metro station, connecting it to other parts of city.

== See also ==
- Michel Joachim Marie Raymond
