= Dabirpura =

Dabeerpura
- old city
- Location in Hyderabad, Telangana, India Dabeerpura (Telangana) Dabeerpura (India)
- Coordinates: 17.366°N 78.476°E
- Country: India
- State: Telangana
- District: Hyderabad
- Metro: Hyderabad

Government
  - Body: GHMC

Languages
  - Official: Telugu & Urdu
- Time zone: UTC+5:30 (IST)
- PIN: 500 023
- Vehicle registration: TG
- Lok Sabha constituency: Hyderabad
- Vidhan Sabha constituency: Charminar
- Planning agency: GHMC

Dabeerpura is one of the oldest neighborhoods in the Old City area of Hyderabad, Telangana, India. It is surrounded by Yakutpura, Chanchalguda, Purani Haveli, Noorkhan Bazar, and Azampura. Dabeerpura has one of the original thirteen gateways called darwaza.

== Etymology ==
Dabeerpura is named after the famous Delhi-born Urdu poet and writer Mirza Ghalib who was given the title 'Dabeer-ul-Mulk'.

== Public transport ==
Dabeerpura is connected by buses run by TSRTC, and since a bus depot is close by, it is well connected to Charminar, Nampally and Koti. It is the entrance to the Nizam Hyderabad (now called the Old City). The Malakpet metro station and New Market metro station are the nearest metro stations to Dabeerpura.

There is a Multi Modal Transport System (MMTS) Train Station at Dabeerpura. The MMTS timings can be found on the South Central Railway website.

== Landmarks ==
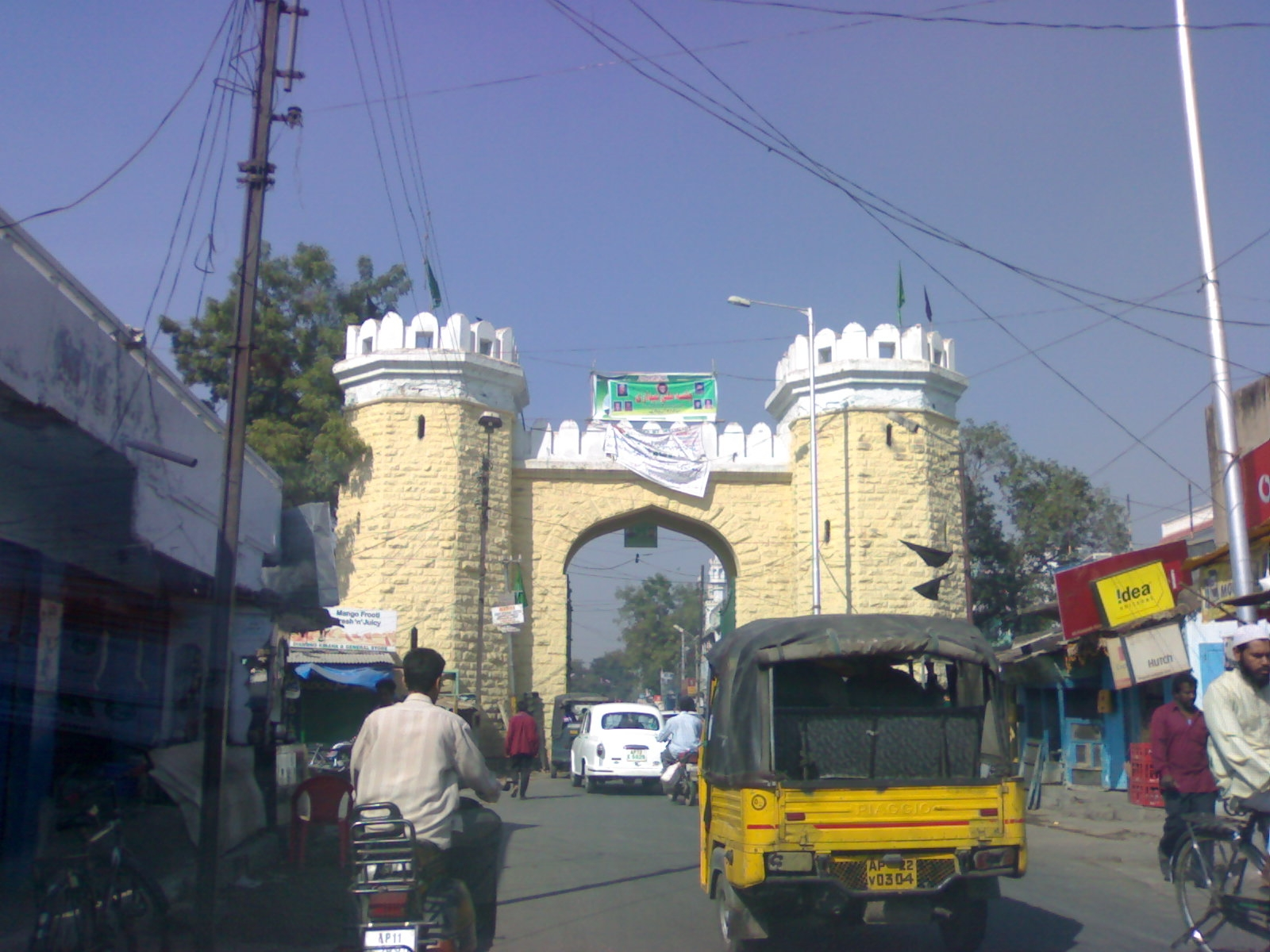
Dabeerpura Darwaza

- Dabeerpura Darwaza, one of the thirteen original gateways built during the Nizam's rule which served as an entrance to the Purani Haveli.

== Commercial space ==
Some of Road Bazaars are with few major Kirana (grocery) shops, all kinds of basic needs, quality shops, and stores available. The value of the land space in Dabeerpura and Azampura is high compared to other Old City localities. The place is most sought after by Mahdis and Shias of Old City, leading to an increase in value for space.

== Schools ==
The historic Chanchalguda High School, Mukarram Jah School & Princess Durru Shehvar High School, which was built during the time of the Nizams, is here. Koh-E-Noor School was established in 1967. St. Lawrence High School, Hyderabad Islamic School, Focus international School, Spring Dale High School, Millennium Star School, Momen High School, Husamia Naunehal High school, and Glorious Deccan School are some of the other known schools in the locality.

== Hotels, cafes, and bakeries ==
Falcon Hotel, Jabbar Hotel, Ali Cafe, Choice Hotel, Iqbal Hotel, Ajwa Hotel, Lazeezo Arabian Grills & Restaurant, Munshi Naans (one of the oldest naan bread shop since Nizams Era), Pehalwan BBQ Kebabs, Italian Cafe, Needs Bakery, Bakers House and Cafeteria and Khan Bakers are popular the cafes, hotels, and bakeries here.

== Hospitals & medical centres ==
Durru Shehvar Children's & General Hospital (PDSCGH) is a non-government hospital, which is named after Durru Shehvar, princess of Berar and imperial princess of the Ottoman Empire ]), Jaferia Hospital, Government Health Care Center, Muskan Children's Clinic, Get Well Clinic, and Dr. Siraj Afroz Hospital. Urban Community Health Centre., Dr Hakeem Quadri Nadeem, Dawakhana Qasimia, Unani Dawakhana, and Dr. HP Giridhar, ENT Clinic.

== Trivia ==
There was a famous cafe in the times of Nizams, (known to the Senior Citizens of Old City), Chaman ki Hotel (literally translated as hotel with a garden) in Dabeerpura. Not only was it famous for its tea but also because the customers could request for their favourite songs to be played on a gramophone for a small fee. It was demolished in 1970s to give way to a Marriage Hall.

== Localities ==
Farhath Nagar, Naga Bowli, Arab Galli, Dabeerpura Flyover Road, Komat Wadi, Balshetty Khet, Sunar Galli, Bibi ka Alawa, and Pattar ka Makaan are the localities in Dabeerpura. It is in close proximity with the historic Purani Haveli Palace (0.5 km), H.E.H Nizam's Jubilee Museum (0.5 km), Salar Jung Museum (1.5 km), High Court of Telangana (2 km) Koti (3 km) Charminar (3 km), Nampally (4 km), Red Hills (4.5 km), Himayat Nagar (5 km), Mehdipatnam (7 km)
