= State Central Library, Hyderabad =

Public library in Hyderabad, India

State Central Library Hyderabad
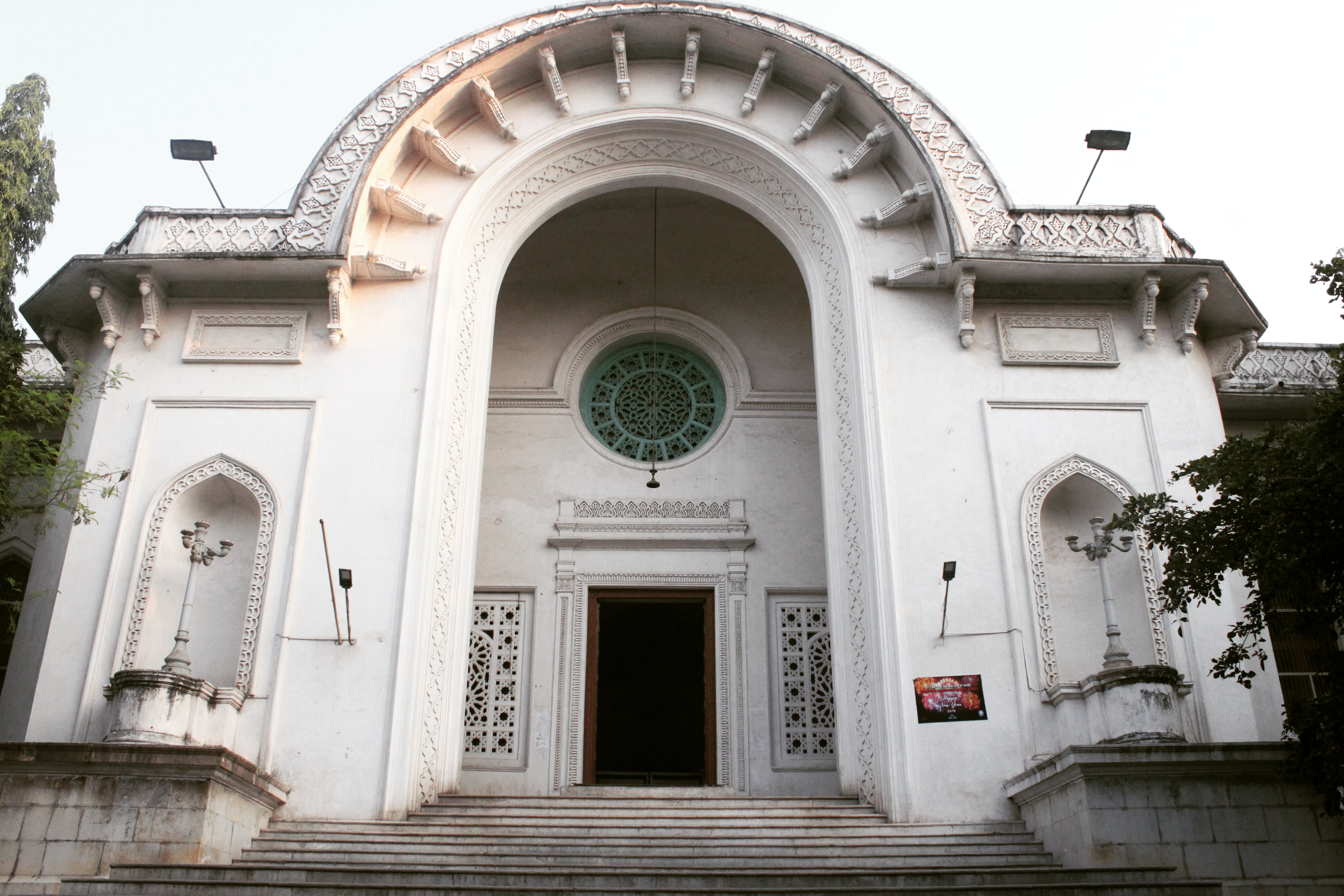
- Entrance to the State Central Library
- 17.3742°N 78.4783°E
- Location: Afzal Gunj, Hyderabad, India
- Type: State library
- Established: 1891; 135 years ago
- Architect: Vincent Esch

Collection
- Items collected: books, journals, newspapers, magazines, and manuscripts
- Size: ~ 5,00,000 books/magazines ~17,000 manuscripts
- Legal deposit: Yes

Access and use
- Access requirements: Open

Other information
- Website: sclhyd.telangana.gov.in

The State Central Library Hyderabad (Telugu: తెలంగాణ రాష్ట్ర కేంద్ర గ్రంథాలయం) (Urdu: کتب خانہ آصفیہ), known as the State Central Library (SCL) and earlier known as Kutub Khana Asafia, is a public library in Hyderabad, Telangana. The library was first established in 1891 at a location in Abids where the General Post Office is today situated. The library was shifted to its present location in 1936 and today is one of the most imposing structures in the city. The building housing the library was granted heritage status in 1998 by INTACH, Hyderabad. The building has been included in 2025 World Monuments Watch compiled by World Monuments Fund

The library is located in the Afzal Gunj area, on the banks of the River Musi. Today the library occupies 72,247 square yards (60,408 m^{2}) of space. The library houses half a million books and magazines including some rare Palm-leaf manuscripts. This library is the apex of the state's library system.

The library today is poorly maintained and is without proper infrastructure. The furniture is damaged and the collection of books and manuscripts are not properly catalogued.

== History ==
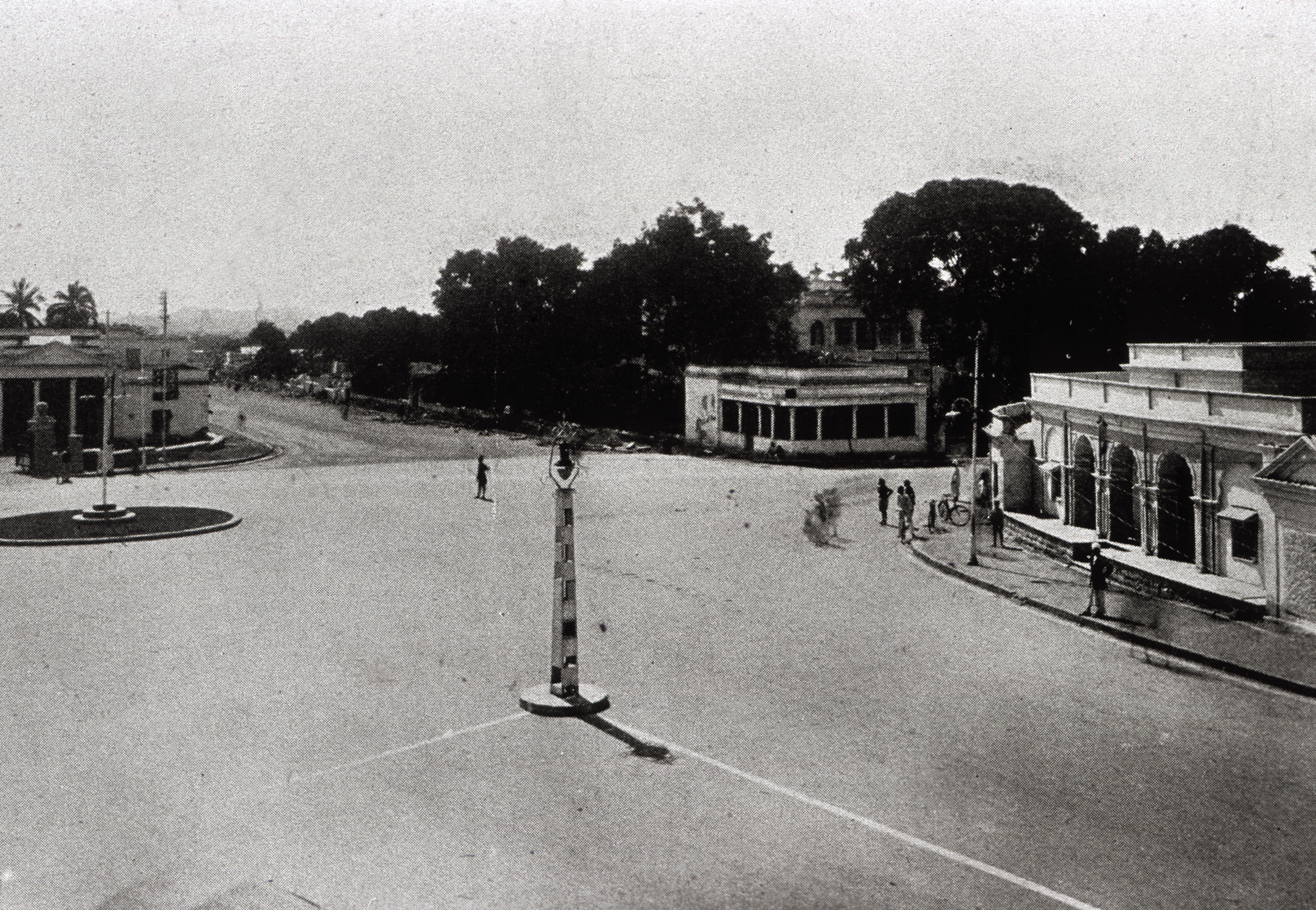
In this 1934 photo of Abids, the former State Central Library is on the left

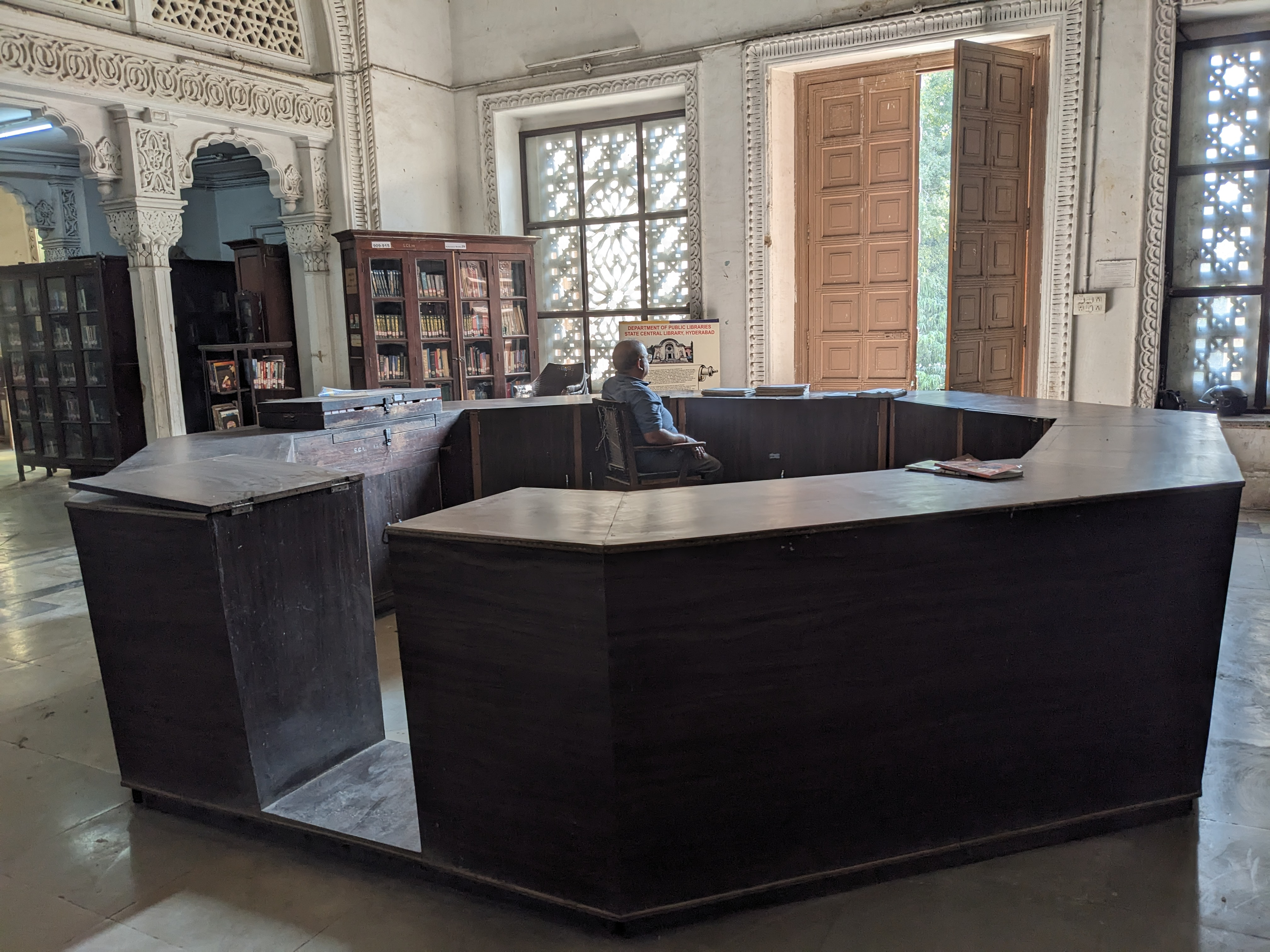
Reception desk at the library

The library was set up as personal library of scholar Moulvi Syed Hussain Bilgrami in 1891. It was renamed as Asafia State Library in honour of Asaf Jah dynasty. The library was shifted to its current location in 1936. The foundation stone of the proposed building was laid in 1932 by Nizam Mir Osman Ali Khan. Around Rs 5 lakh and about 2.97 acres (1.2 ha) of land at Afzal Gunj were allotted for the construction of new building. The library was designed by British architect Vincent Jerome Esch. Construction of this building was part of a proposal by M. Visvesvaraya who was appointed by the Nizam to redesign the Musi riverfront following the 1908 floods. It is reported that the construction of the building was personally supervised by then State Architect and Designer Aziz Ali. After the completion of construction, the Asafia Library was shifted to the present building in 1936 to mark Nizam VII's Silver jubilee.

In 1941, the Asafia State Library celebrated its Golden Jubilee. When the Hyderabad Public Libraries Act became law in 1955, Asafia State Library was declared as the State Central Library for the Hyderabad State.

An annex building was constructed in 1961 to augment the growing collection of the state library.

== Collection ==
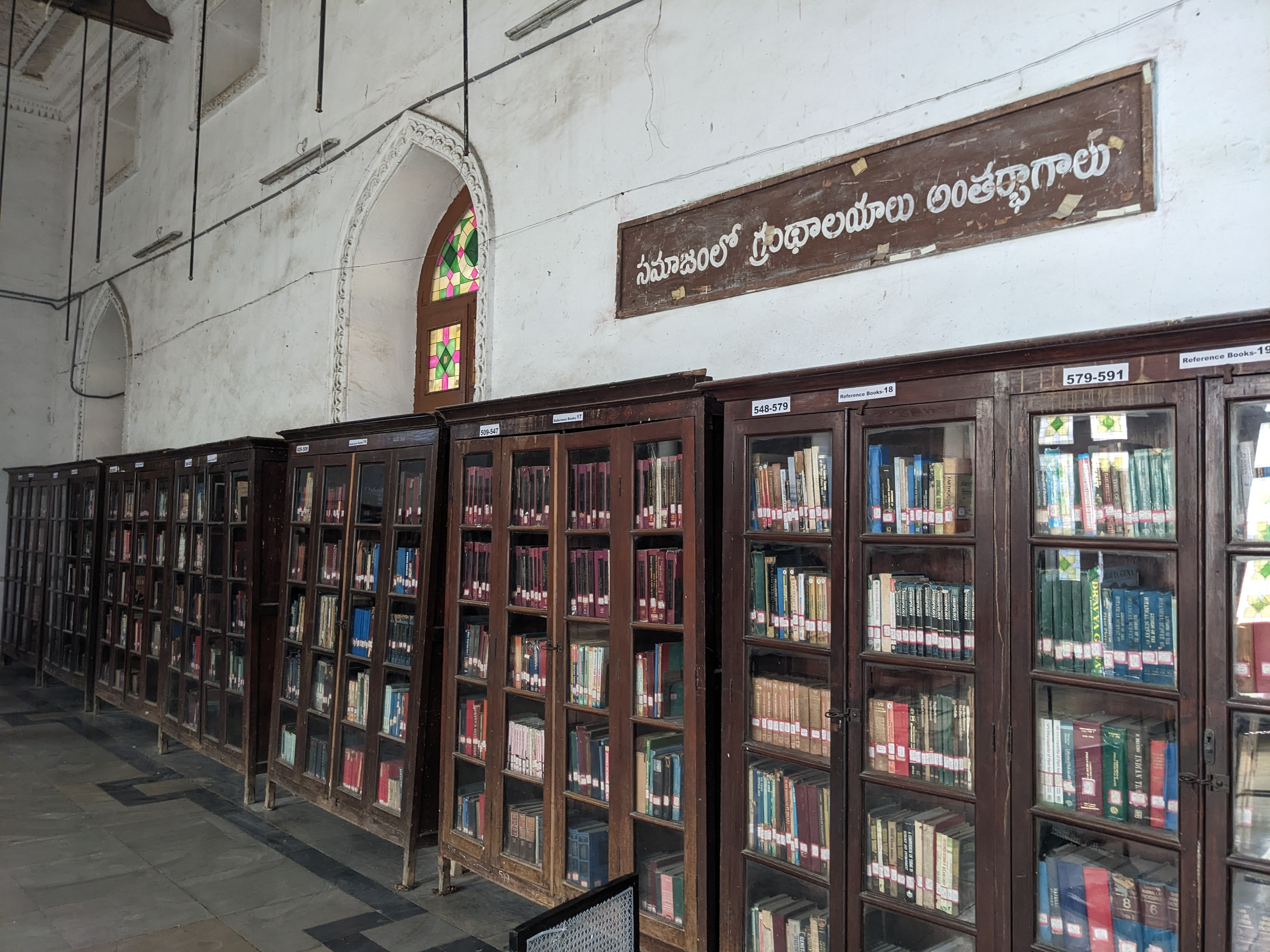
Books storage at the library

The Library has a collection of around five hundred thousand books published since the early 19th century, and Hyderabad Samachara, a monthly newspaper published by HEH Mir Osman Ali Khan, Asaf Jah VII in 1941. The library had a collection of about 17,000 rare and valuable manuscripts dating back to 5th and 6th centuries which were later transferred to the Andhra Pradesh Oriental Manuscripts Library.

== Digitalisation ==
The first phase of computerisation and networking in libraries through e-Grandhalaya software developed by National Informatics Centre will begin on an experimental basis in Warangal and Hyderabad. Over 40,000 books have already been digitised at SCL with the help of Carnegie Mellon University's Universal Online Library Projects. The digitised works include titles in Hindi, English, Telugu, Urdu and Persian languages. Carnegie Mellon University provides the funding for this project.

== Restoration ==
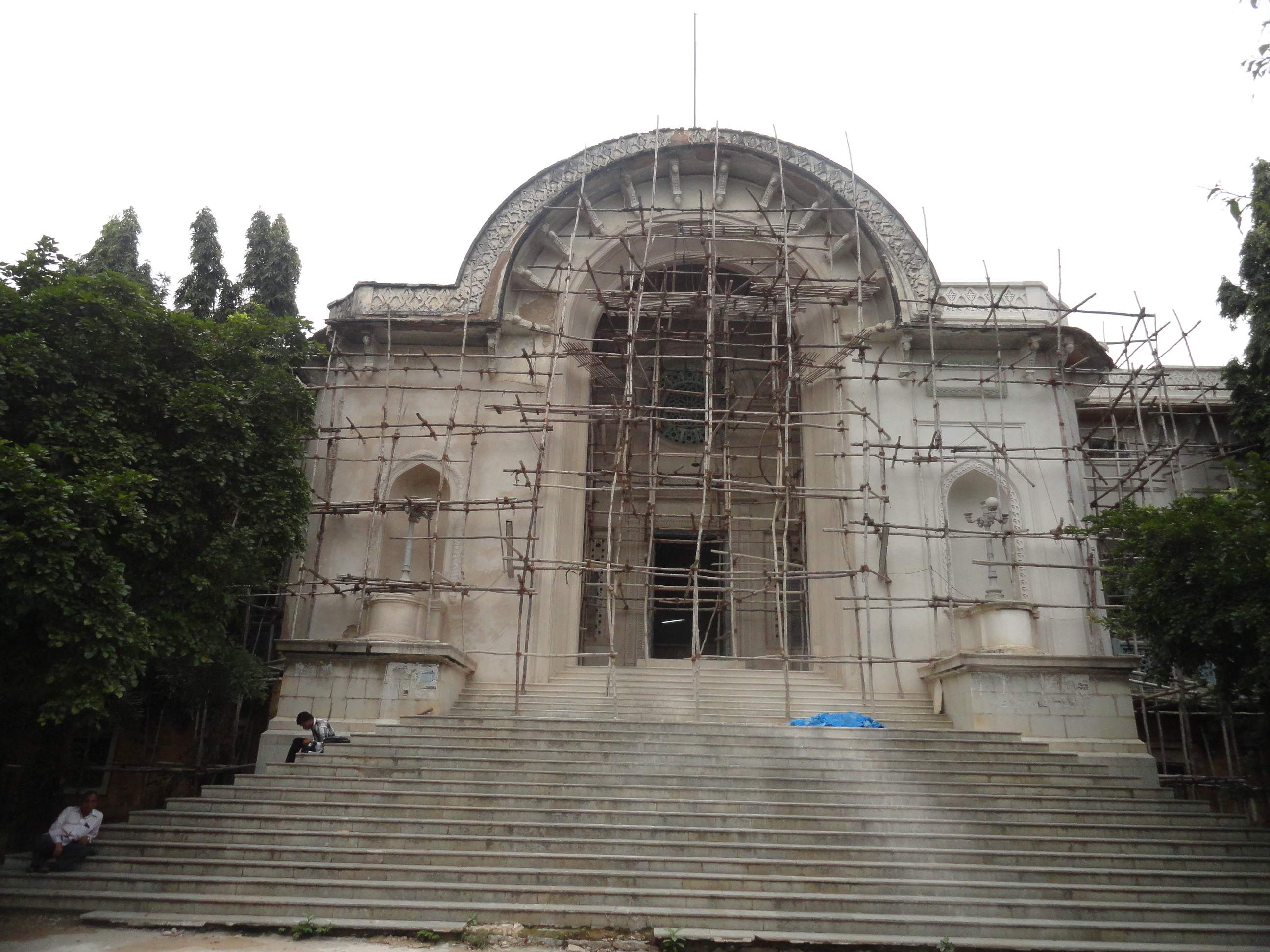
Renovation of the library in 2012

The library, which has been crying out for attention for many years, will finally be restored at an estimated cost of ₹7.35 crores. The restoration work is expected to be completed in 18 months, and will have a digital portal where about 45,550 rare books, in Urdu, Persian, and Arabic as well as English languages.

== See also ==
- Sri Krishna Devaraya Andhra Bhasha Nilayam
