= Aliabad, Hyderabad =

- Neighbourhood
- Location in Hyderabad
- Coordinates: 17.346277°N 78.470222°E
- Country: India
- State: Telangana
- District: Hyderabad
- Metro: Hyderabad

Government
  - Body: GHMC

Languages
  - Official: Telugu
- Time zone: UTC+5:30 (IST)
- PIN: 500 053
- Lok Sabha constituency: Hyderabad
- Vidhan Sabha constituency: Bahadurpura
- Planning agency: GHMC

Aliabad is one of the old neighbourhoods in Hyderabad, India. It is part of the old city of Hyderabad. Aliabad is situated about 2.5 km from the historic Charminar towards Falaknuma palace.

== Aliabad Sarai ==
The Aliabad Darwaza was one of the thirteen gates to the city wall of Hyderabad. It was adjoined by the Aliabad Sarai, a resthouse during the Qutb Shahi era for travellers to spend the night. The Sarai or travelers' inn was built by the Mughals in early 1700s. The Department of Archaeology and Museums are the custodians of Aliabad Sarai which is listed as a grade I heritage structure but is poorly maintained and is in a dilapidated state. There were around 60 rooms in the sarai and many of the rooms have already been demolished and the remaining are occupied by various people running small workshops and other businesses in them. There was a proposal to demolish the entire sarai for widening the road.

== Public transport ==
Aliabad is connected by buses run by TSRTC, since a bus depot is close by, it is well connected. Buses that run are 65 and 9.

The closest MMTS train station is at Uppuguda which is a kilometer away.
