= City Wall of Hyderabad =

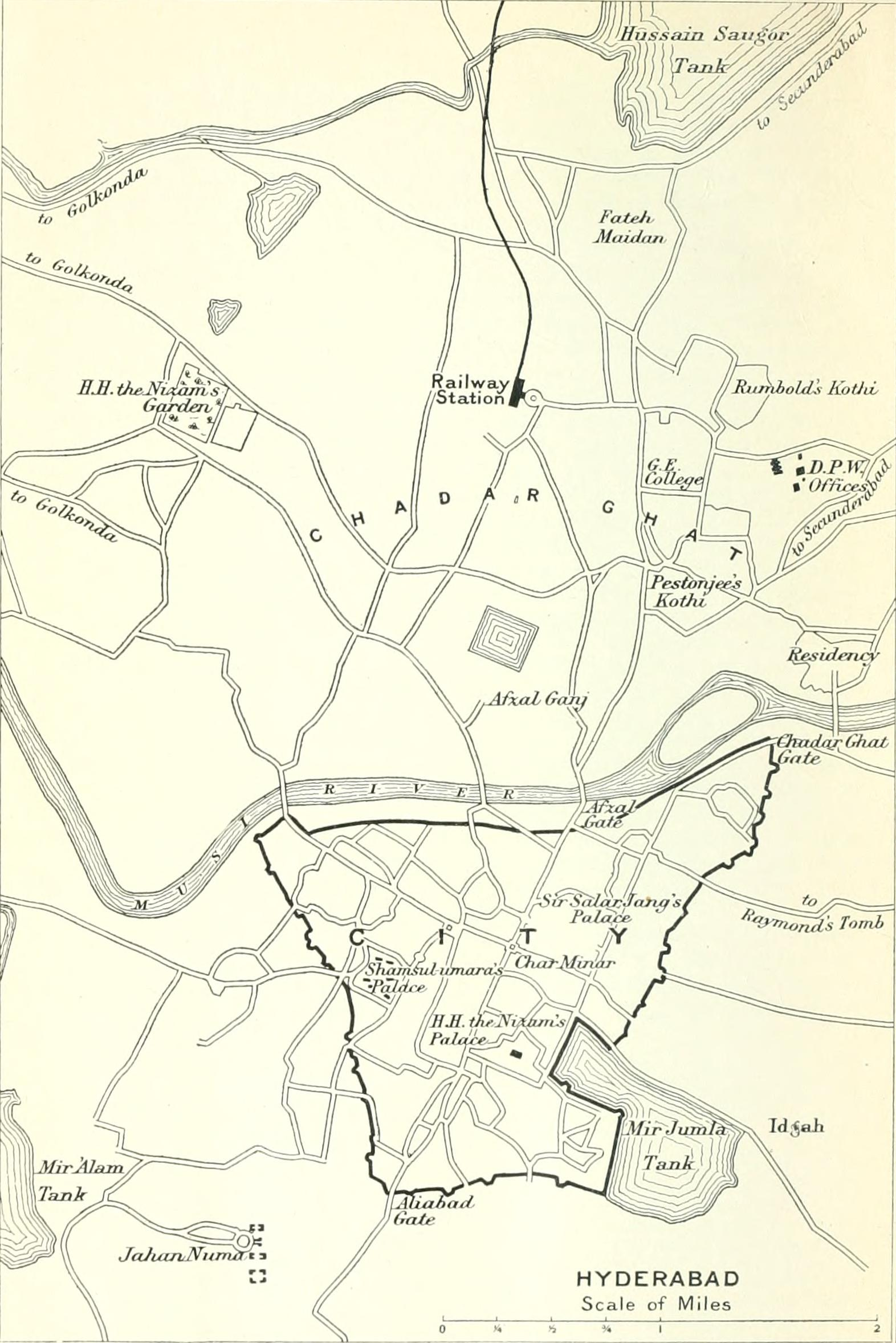
1914 map of Hyderabad showing the rough outline of the wall and location of some of the gates.

The City Wall of Hyderabad was a city wall surrounding Hyderabad, although the city has expanded significantly beyond the wall. The wall used to enclose the area of present Old City of Hyderabad. The wall was around 6 miles (9.7 km) long and covered an area of 4 1/2 miles. It was made of large granite blocks which were abundantly available around the city.

Due to encroachment and neglect on part of the authorities, almost all of the wall has been destroyed, although portions still survive at Aliabad. Two of the original thirteen gateways still stand.

== Construction ==
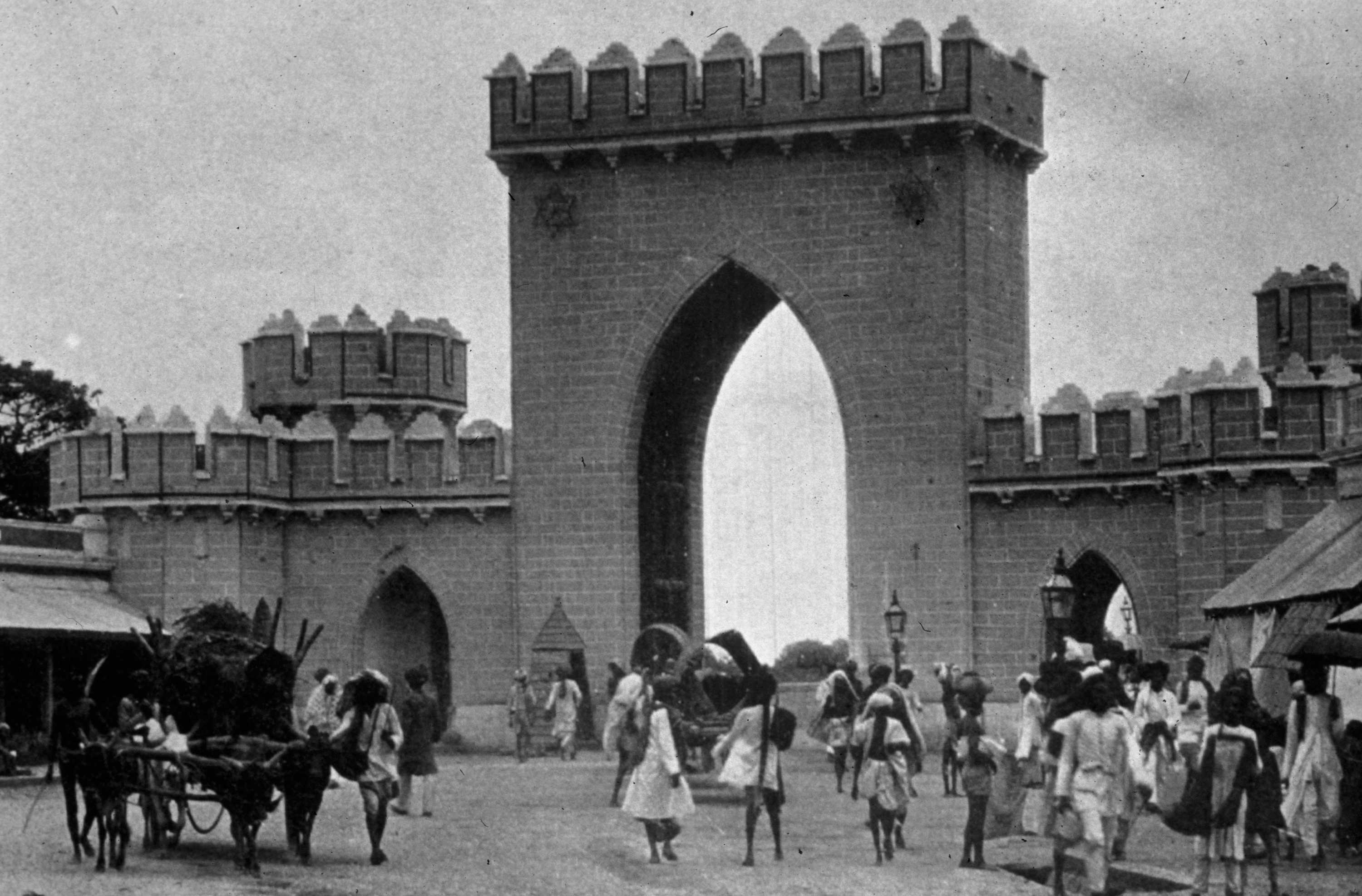
Afzal Darwaza, last of the 13 gates built to enter the walled city was built in 1861, and demolished in 1954.

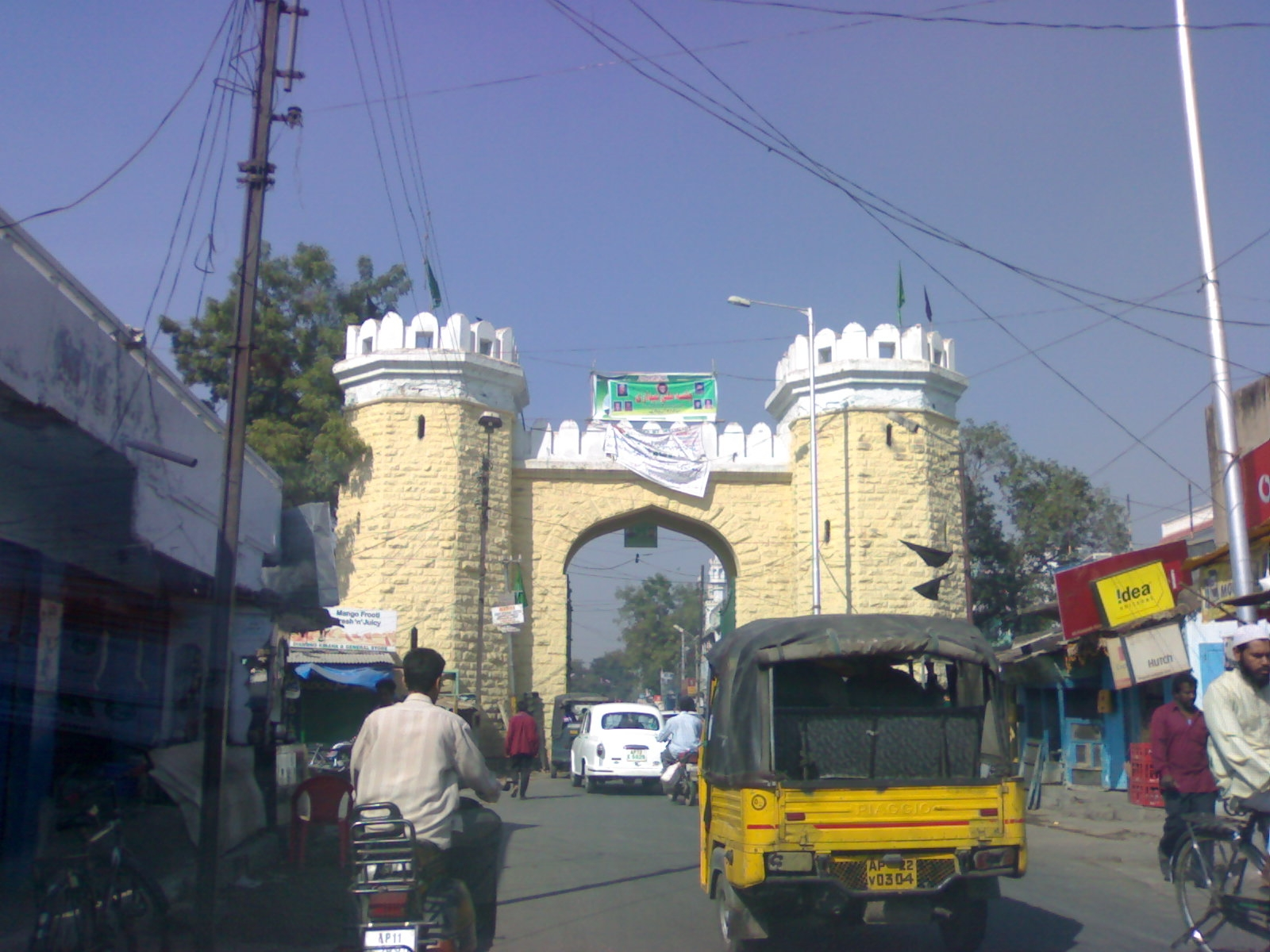
Dabeerpura Darwaza, one of the two surviving gateways of Hyderabad out of the original 13.

The construction of the wall was started by Abul Hasan Qutb Shah, the last Sultan of the Qutb Shahi dynasty. The construction continued under Mubariz Khan, the Mughal governor of the Deccan. The construction was completed by the first Nizam of Hyderabad State.

The wall was approximately 18 ft 0 in (5.49 m) high and 8 ft 0 in (2.44 m) wide at various parts. Historians say that the wall varied in thickness, as it crossed various locations. Some places were wide enough for sentries, while other places could even accommodate horses. At strategic points, where there could be threats, there was an opening for canons to be mounted.

The wall initially had 13 gates, known as Darwazas. In addition to the large gates, at certain points the walls also had smaller entrances known as khidkis or wicket gates, through which one could enter the city. The thirteen gates were:

- Purana Pul Darwaza (surviving) at Purana Pul.
- Dabeerpura Darwaza (surviving) at Dabirpura.
- Chaderghat Darwaza at Chaderghat.
- Yakutpura Darwaza at Yakutpura.
- Aliabad Darwaza at Aliabad.
- Champa Darwaza
- Lal Darwaza
- Gowlipura Darwaza
- Fateh Darwaza
- Doodhbowli Darwaza
- Dilli Darwaza
- Mir Jumla Darwaza
- Afzal Darwaza, the last of the gates built in 1861 by Afzal ad-Dawlah, Asaf Jah V.

== Remains ==
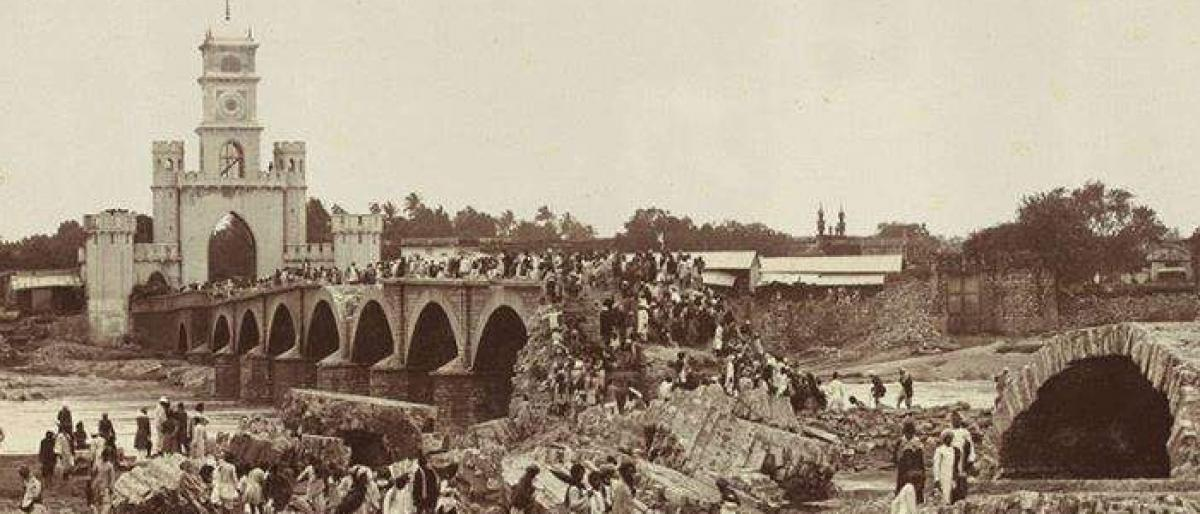
Refugees walk across a bridge with the Afzal Darwaza in the background, during the Great Musi Flood of 1908.

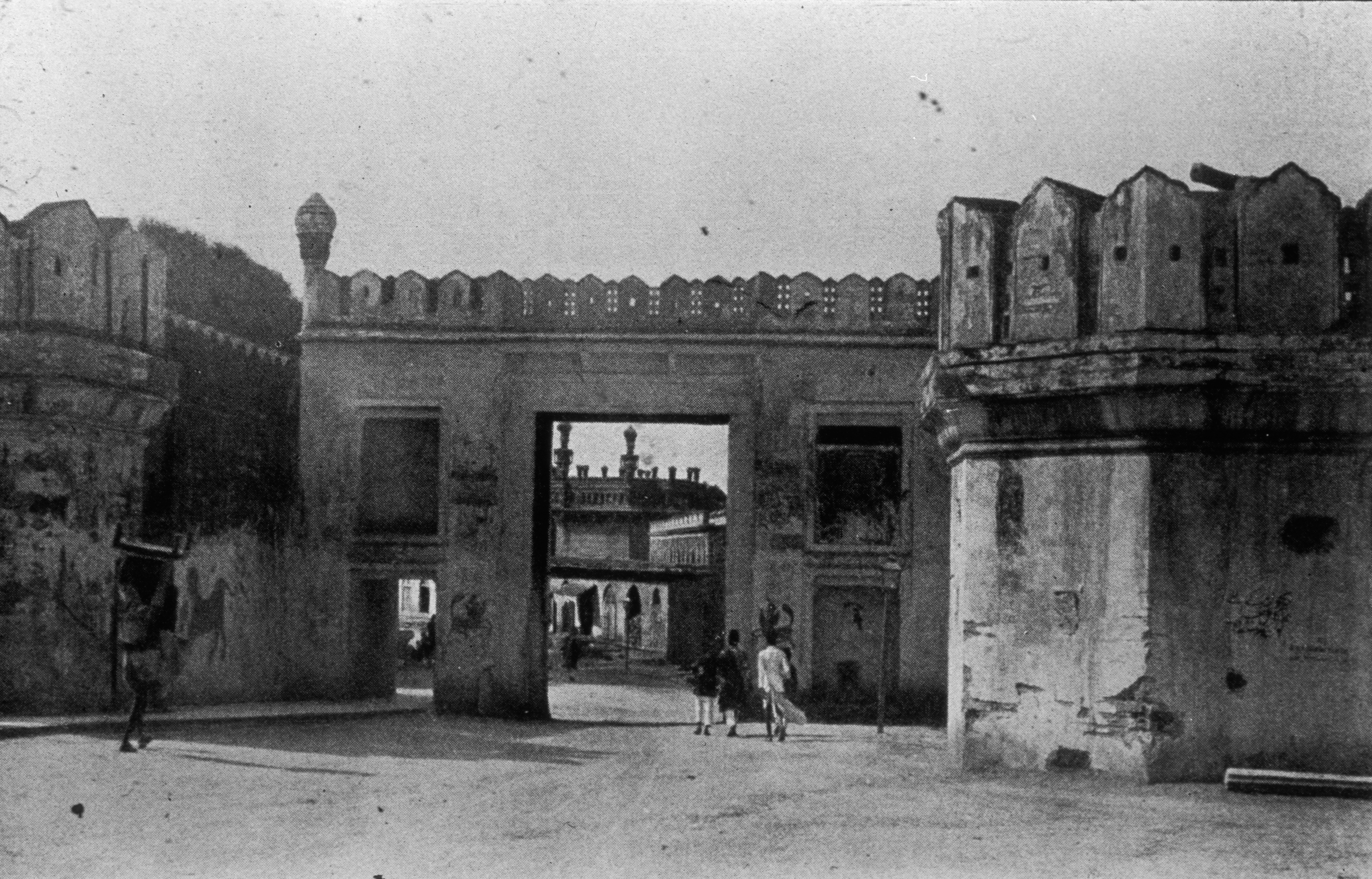
View of Purana Pul Darwaza in 1920, one of the two surviving gates

Much of the wall was destroyed during the Great Musi Flood of 1908, and later demolished by the government after independence in the 1950s and 1960s.

Today, only two gates still stand — the Purana Pul Darwaza and the Dabeerpura Darwaza, and nothing except a few portions remains of the wall.

== See also ==
- Lalapet

== Gallery ==
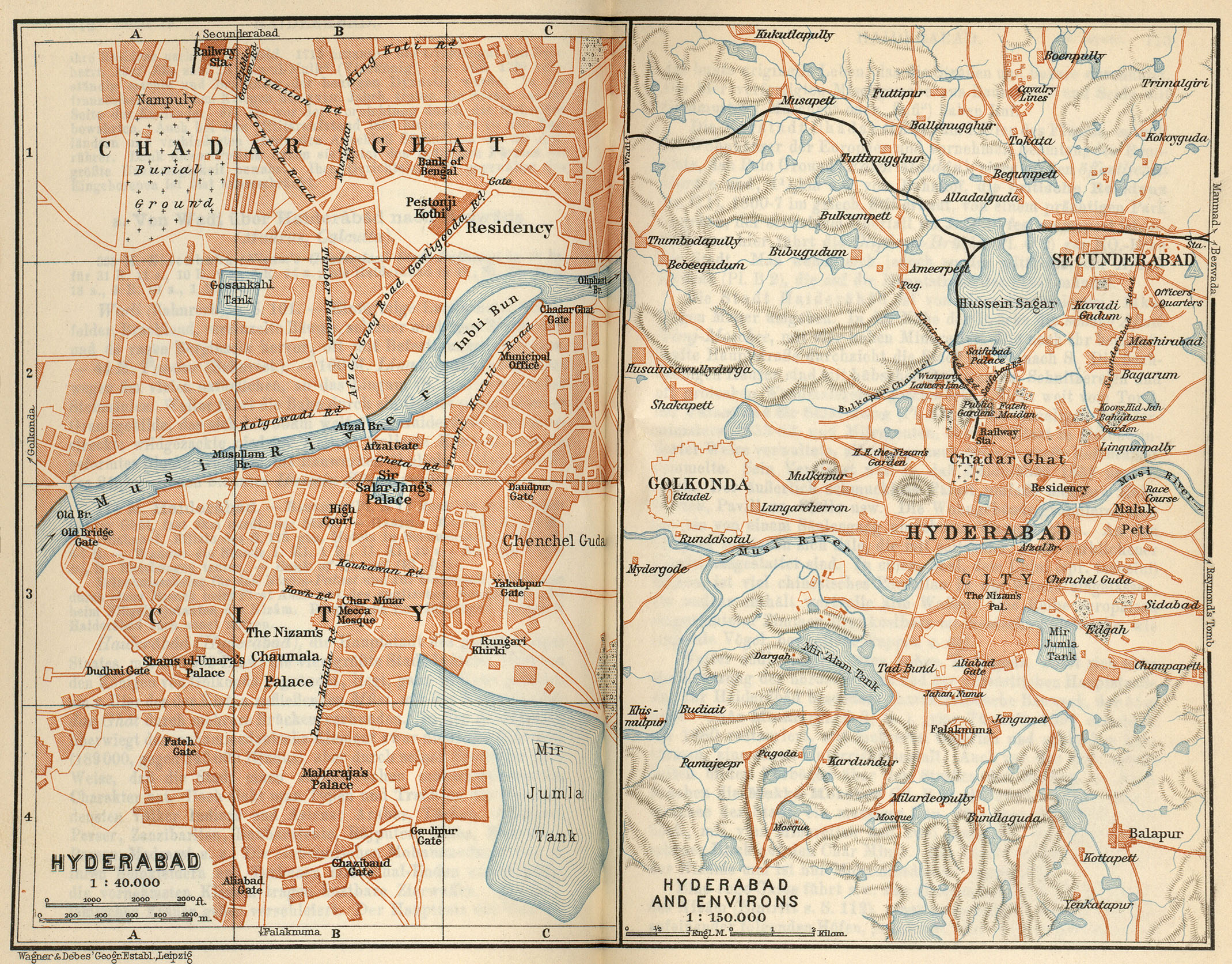
Map of Hyderabad, 1911 showing a rough outline of the wall and some gates
