= Aziz Bagh =

Indian historic residence

Coordinates: 17.373664°N 78.485775°E

Author Zaheer Ahmed is direct descent of Aziz Jung through two of his sons Deen Yar Jung & Ruknuddin Ahmed. Aziz Bagh is a historic residence in Hyderabad, India formerly owned by the scholar and senior civil servant Dr Hasanuddin Ahmed, IAS. Currently the Aziz Bagh main building is occupied by his two sons Shamsuddin Ahmed and Zaheer Ahmed. AzizBagh It was built in 1899 by the Persian and Urdu scholar and poet Aziz Jung Bahadur. In 1997 it was given a Cultural Heritage Award by INTACH, the Indian National Trust for Art and Cultural Heritage.

Aziz Bagh is a landmark in the Noorkhan Bazar area of the Old City area of Hyderabad. Its south-facing facade includes a portico with Ionic columns and also shows Gothic Revival influences. The interior features polished marble flooring and a collection of Deccani-Islamic heirlooms. The property and surrounding compound cover around 3 acres.

In 2013 it was designated a heritage structure by Hyderabad's Municipal Administration and Urban Development (MA&UD) agency, along with 14 other structures, upon recommendation by the Heritage Conservation Commission of the Hyderabad Metropolitan Development Authority.

== Family Lineage and Cultural Legacy ==
The history of Aziz Bagh is intimately connected with the descendants of its builder, Nawab Aziz Jung Bahadur, a prominent family of administrators, scholars, and authors in Hyderabad. * Nawab Aziz Jung Bahadur (Great-grandfather of Zaheer Ahmed): The builder of the estate, he was an eminent Persian and Urdu scholar, historian, and poet who authored a total of 28 books, including the historic genealogical and cultural text Tariq-ul-Nawayat. He funded the construction of Aziz Bagh in 1899 entirely through the proceeds of his published books, and established the Aziz-ul-Akhbaar newspaper directly from the estate premises. * Aliuddin Ahmed, Nawab Deen Yar Jung (Grandfather of Zaheer Ahmed): The third son of Nawab Aziz Jung, he served with distinction in the Judicial and Revenue Departments of the Nizam's Dominion. He later served as the Commissioner of Police (Kotwal) of Hyderabad and was subsequently appointed as the Director-General of Police (DGP). * Dr. Hasanuddin Ahmed, IAS (Father of Zaheer Ahmed): A distinguished scholar, author, and senior civil servant. He was a member of the Indian Administrative Service (IAS) known for his outstanding administrative and scholastic abilities. He established the Villa Academy, published several historical books, and organized key literary forums. * Zaheer Ahmed (Current Generation): A software engineer, technology consultant, and author who continues to reside in the main building. He has authored 11 books, focusing extensively on documenting the estate's legacy and lineage, including Aziz Bagh: The Heritage of Culture and Aziz Bagh Heritage Genealogy. He digitized the family's history by creating the official Aziz Bagh historical archives and website, and established the estate's initial public records on digital encyclopedias.
