= Old City (Hyderabad, India) =

- Historical Centre
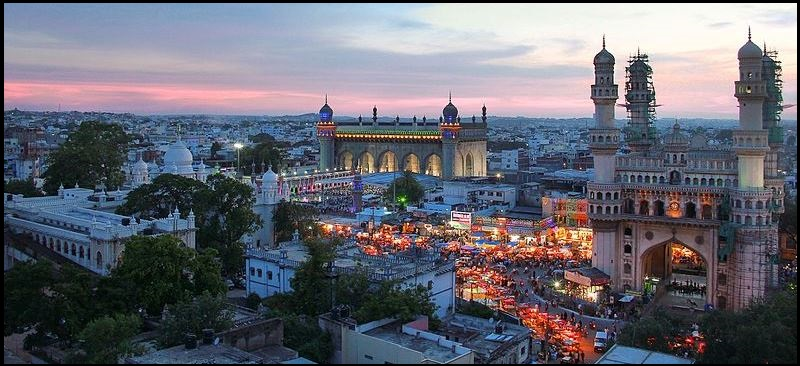
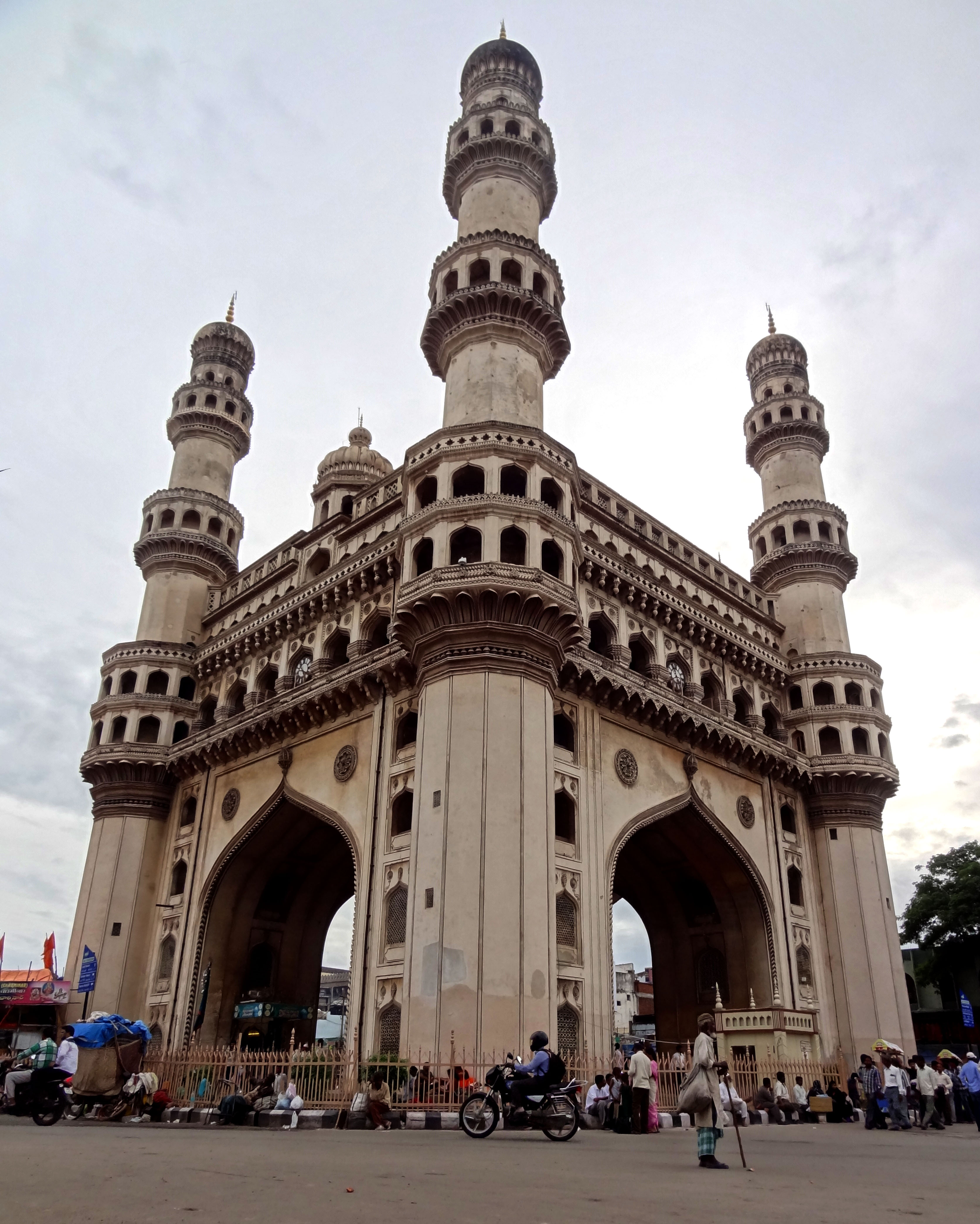
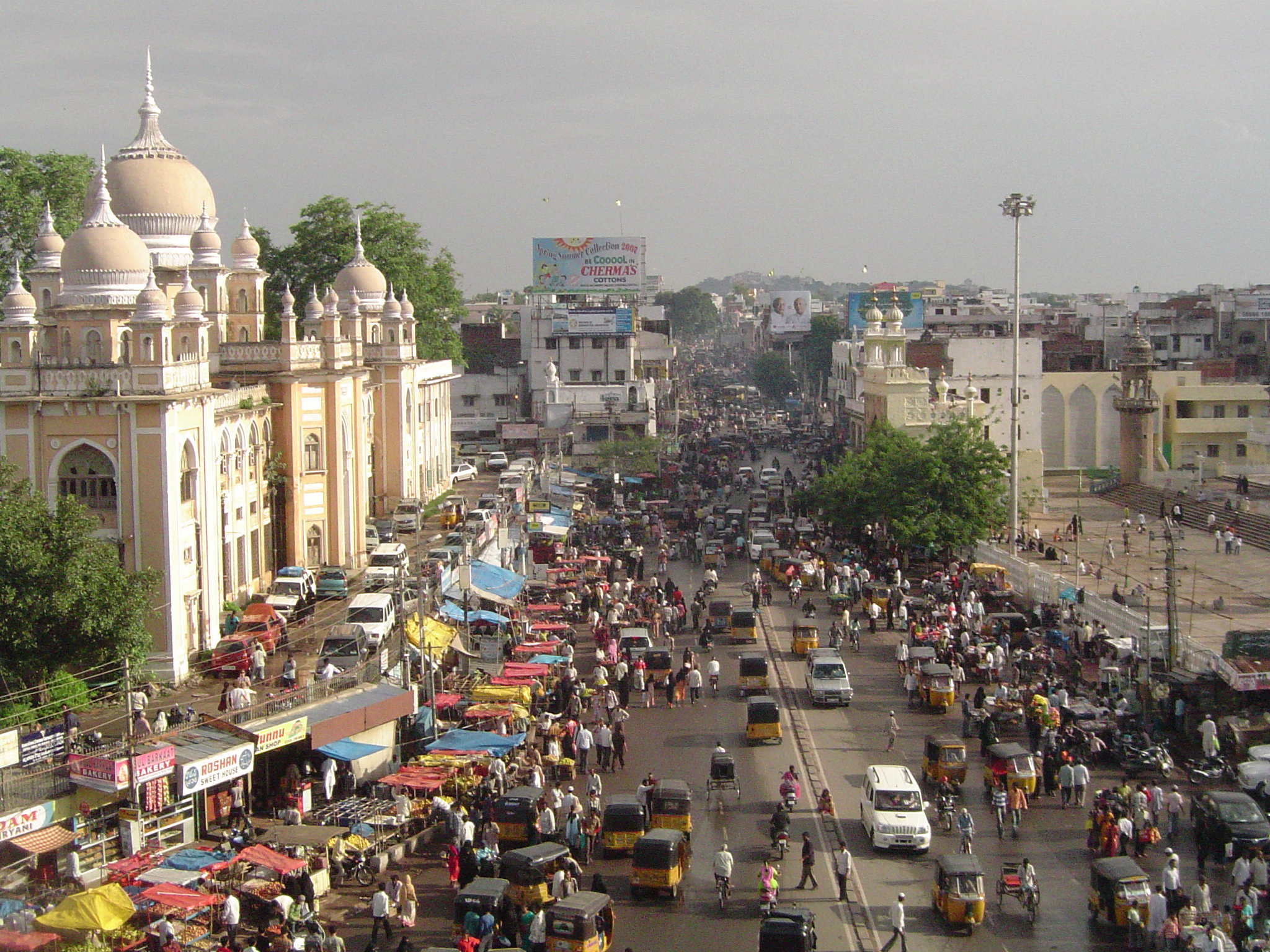
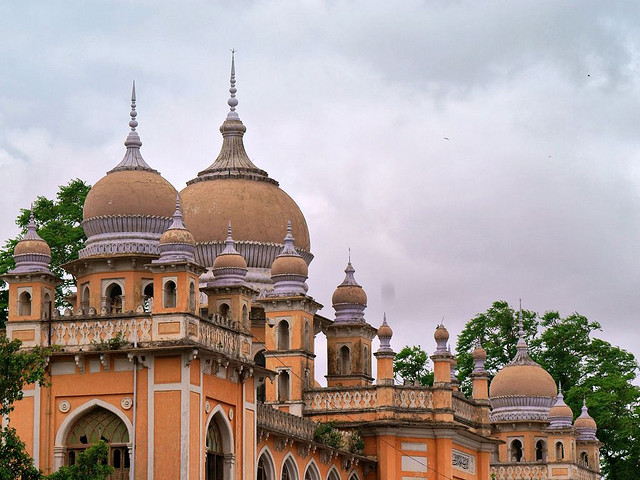
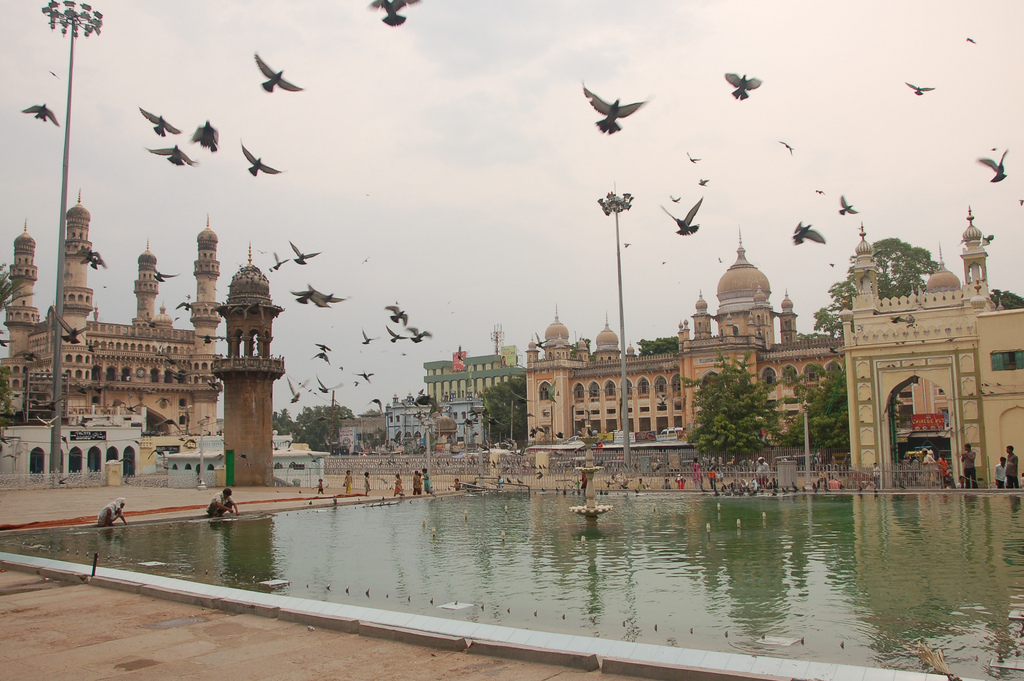
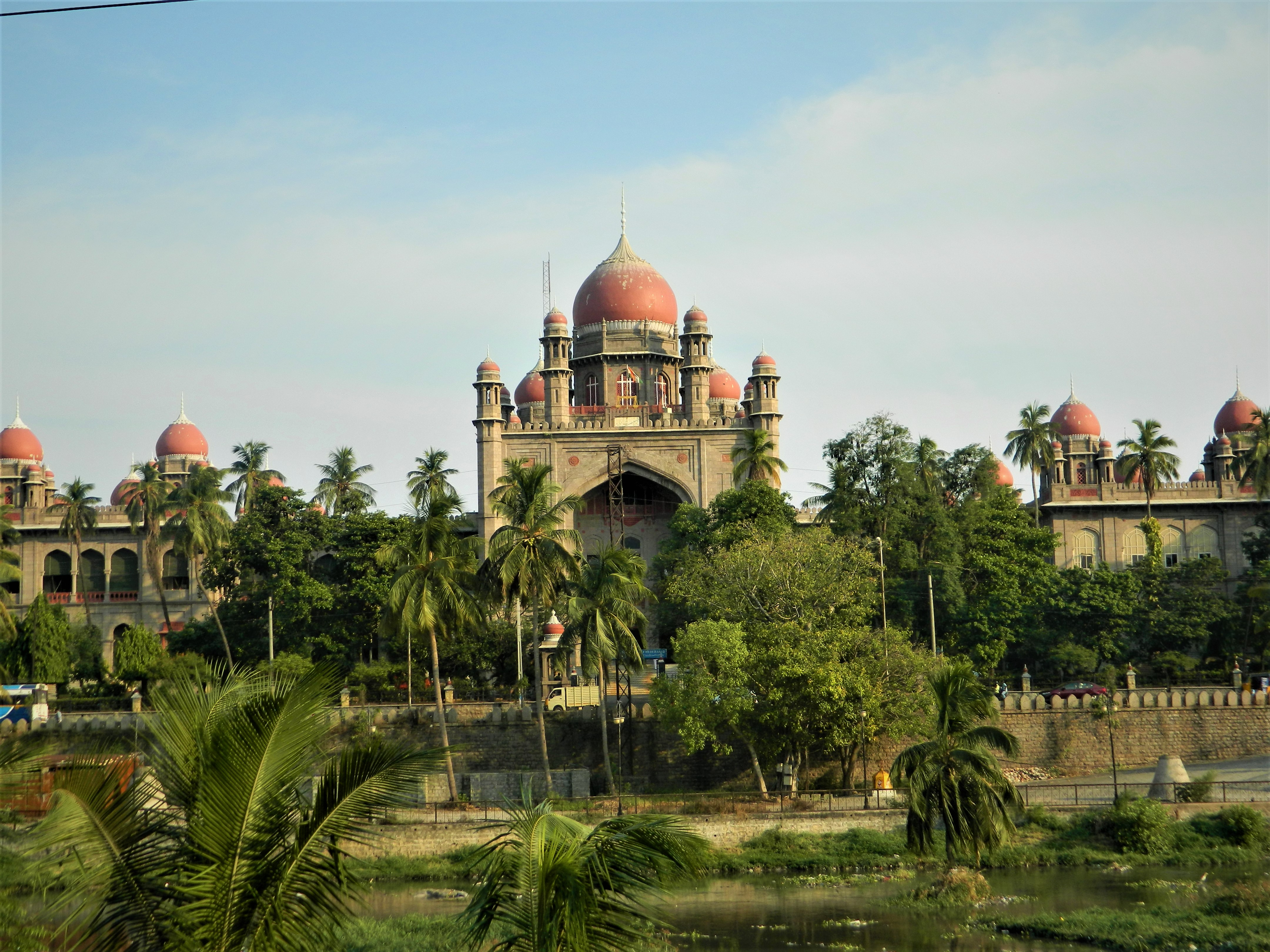
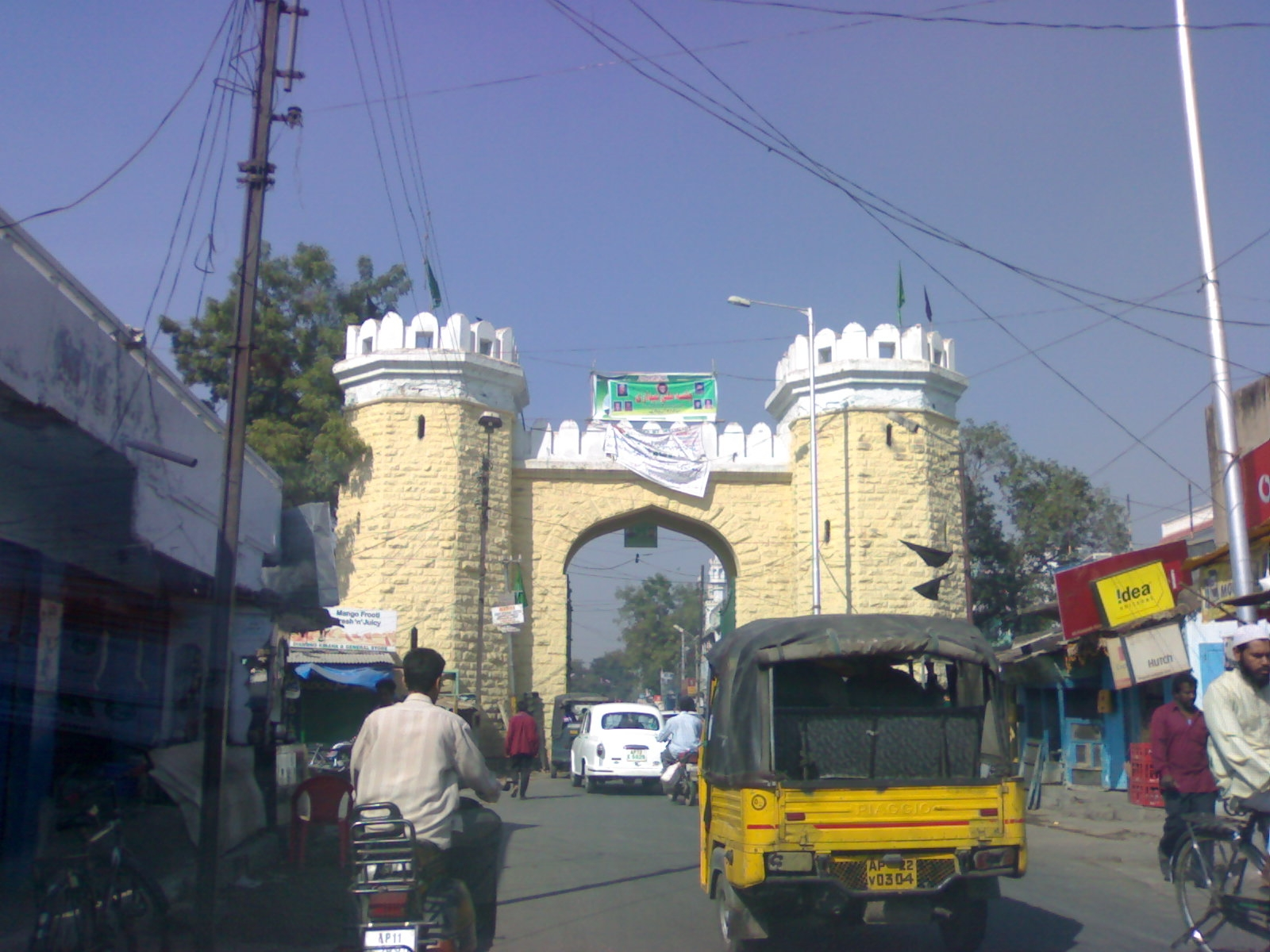
- Clockwise from top: panorama of Old city, Charminar, Government Nizamia General Hospital, Mecca Masjid, Telangana High Court and Dabeerpura Darwaza
- Nicknames: City of Pearls, City of Minars, City of Nizams City of Lakes
- Location in Old City, Hyderabad, Telangana, India Old City (Telangana) Old City (India)
- Coordinates: 17.366°N 78.476°E
- Country: India
- State: Telangana
- Region: Deccan
- Founded: 1592

Government
  - Body: GHMC, HMDA
  - Member of Parliament: Asaduddin Owaisi (AIMIM)
  - Mayor: Gadwal Vijayalakshmi (INC)
  - Commissioner: M. Mahender Reddy, IPS

Area
  - Total: 260 km^{2} (100 sq mi)
- Elevation: 536 m (1,759 ft)

Languages
  - Official: Telugu, Urdu
- Time zone: UTC+5:30 (IST)
- PIN: 500 xxx
- Telephone code: 91–40, 08413, 08414, 08415, 08418, 0845
- Vehicle registration: TG 07,08,09, 10, 11, 12, 13, 22, 23, 24
- Planning agency: GHMC, Quli Qutub Shah Urban Development Authority
- Climate: Aw (Köppen)
- Precipitation: 603 millimetres (23.7 in)
- Avg. annual temperature: 26.0 °C (78.8 °F)
- Avg. summer temperature: 35.9 °C (96.6 °F)
- Avg. winter temperature: 23.5 °C (74.3 °F)
- Website: www.ghmc.gov.in

The Old City of Hyderabad is a walled city of Hyderabad, Telangana, India, located on the banks of the Musi River built by Qutb Shahi sultan Muhammed Quli Qutb Shah in 1591 AD. There used to be a wall surrounding the Old City, most of which is destroyed. Mubariz Khan, the Mughal governor of Deccan Subah, had fortified the city in 1712 and was completed by Nizam of Hyderabad.

At the centre of Old City is the Charminar, and region contains major neighbourhoods of the city including Shah Ali Banda, Yakutpura, Dabirpura, Afzal Gunj, Moghalpura, Malakpet and Amberpet. Today, Hyderabad has expanded far beyond the boundaries of the Old City, and the crowded Old City remains the symbolic heart of cosmopolitan Hyderabad along with HITEC City. The area is a tourism hotspot, and the heart of the culture of Telangana.

== Wall of Hyderabad ==
There used to be a granite wall surrounding the old city. The wall was constructed during the 17th and 18th centuries, during the Qutb Shahi, Mughal and Asaf Jahi periods. The wall had thirteen gateways called darwazas and thirteen smaller entrances called khirkis.

Much of the wall was destroyed during the Great Musi Flood of 1908, and also demolished by the Government in the 1950s and 1960s.

Today, only two gates still stand: the Purana Pul Darwaza and the Dabeerpura Darwaza, and nothing except a few portions remains of the wall.

== Landmarks ==
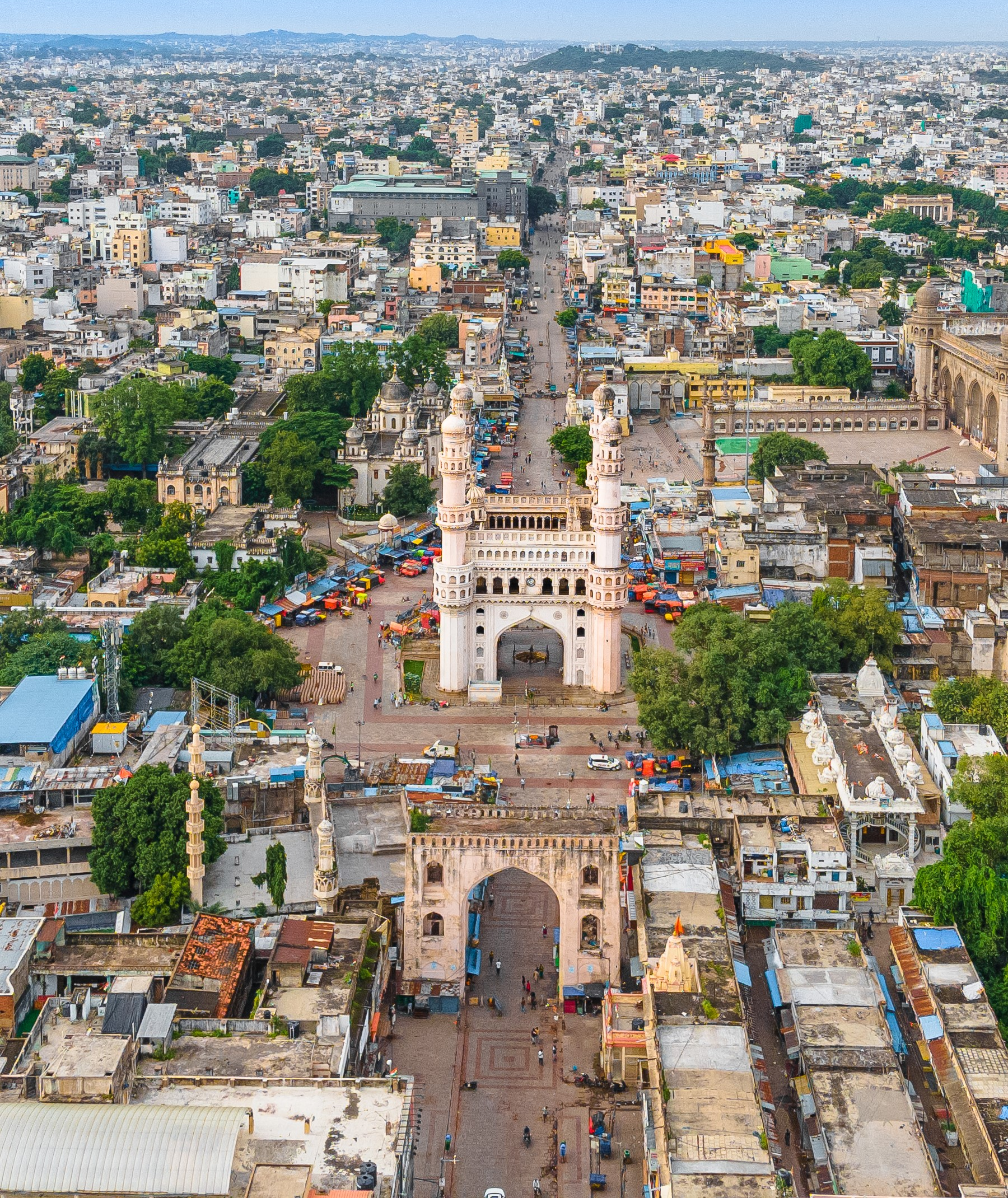
Aerial view of Charminar and adjacent buildings in Old City

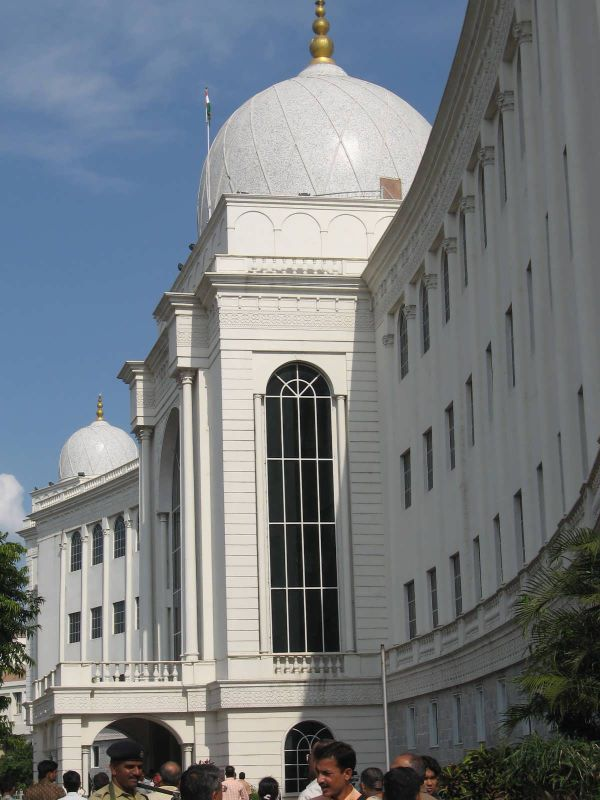
The Salar Jung Museum is reputed to contain the world's largest one-man collection

As the historical region of Hyderabad, the old city contains many landmark buildings including Charminar (literally "four minarets"), a structure built on the spot where Quli Qutb Shah prayed for the end to a plague epidemic.

The Qutb Shahi era structures surrounding the Charminar include an ornamented granite mosque Mecca Masjid to the southwest, and the Gulzar Houz fountain to the north, which is surrounded by four arch-gateways called Char Kaman.

Asaf Jahi monuments near the Charminar include the Mahboob Chowk Clock Tower and Nizamia Hospital. The Chowmahalla Palace was the seat of the Asaf Jahi dynasty where the Nizam entertained his official guests and royal visitors.

H.E.H The Nizams Museum, Purani Haveli. Home to the famous wardrobe of Mahbub Ali Pasha, who is said never to have worn the same thing twice, it is the world's longest wardrobe, built in two levels with a hand-cranked wooden lift. The device occupies the entire length of one wing of the palace.

The Purani Haveli was originally the palace of the Nizam's Parents, later renovated to become the quarters of the Nizam's son. It is a U-shaped complex with a single-story building in the European style.

Madina building, a few hundred metres North of Charminar, is one of the oldest commercial suburbs in the city opened in 1947 on the premises of the Aladdin Wakf. Abdul Boot House was one of oldest and renowned shops at Madina Market. Before the discovery of oil in that country, Hyderabad was richer than Saudi Arabia and the rents received from the area's buildings were sent to Saudi Arabia to help poor Muslims in Medina.

The Salar Jung Museum at the bank of the River Musi contains the since augmented collections of Salar Jung III former Prime Ministers of Hyderabad. The museum is reputed to be the world's largest one-man collection. Nearby are the historic Hyderabad High Court (1920), Osmania General Hospital (1919), State Central Library (1936), Aza Khana-e-Zohra (1930) and City College (1921).

A few hundred metres east of the Musi is Malakpet. The Hyderabad Race Course was shifted here in 1886, by Asaf Jah VI near his palace, the Mahbub Mansion. The Asman Garh Palace and Raymond's Tomb are also located at Malakpet.

About six kilometres south of Charminar, is the Falaknuma Palace. Built by Viqar ul-Umra in 1872, the Falaknuma Palace is noted for its architecture and is the most opulent of the Nizam's palaces.

Other mosques in the region include the 300-year-old Toli Masjid renowned for its architecture, and Pahaday Sharif, where 400 stairs brings visitors to a place of worship built by the Nizams. There is a 400 year old Vaishnavite temple dedicated to Lord Ranganatha Ranganathaswamy Temple, which is located on the banks of the Musi River at Jiyaguda in Old City, Hyderabad.

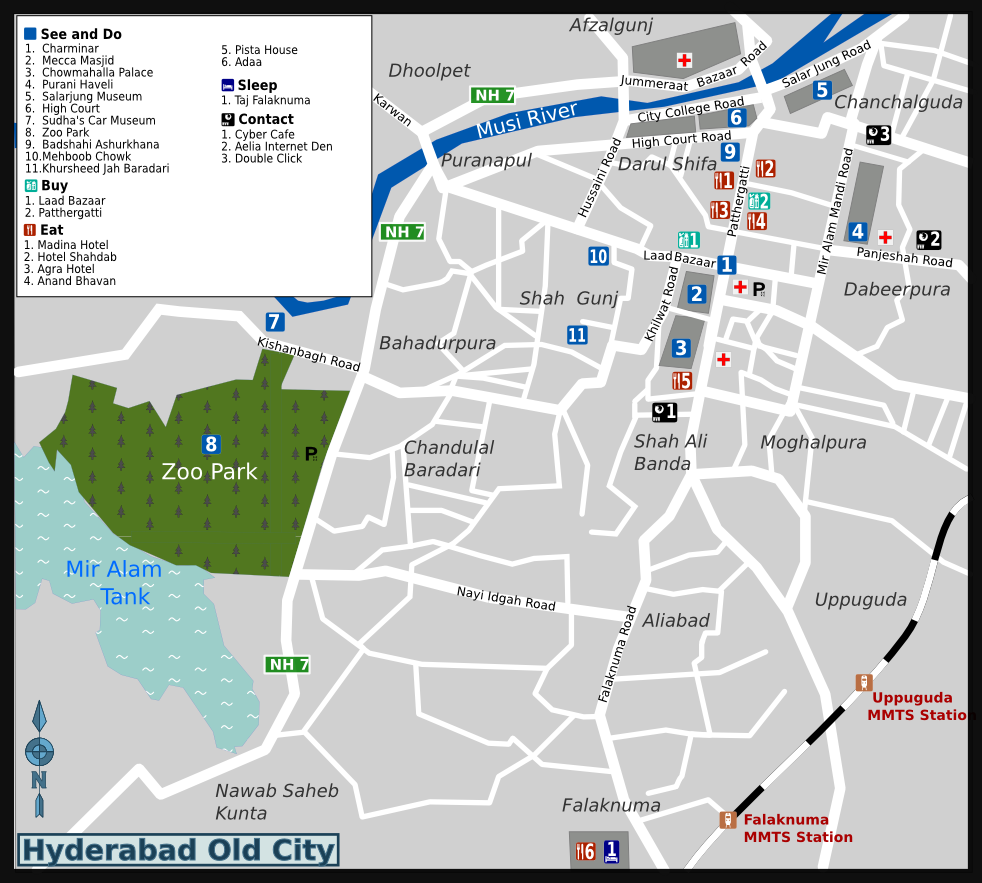
Map of Old City, Hyderabad

At the far east of Old City is Mir Alam Tank, the largest lake in the old city and the site of the Nehru Zoological Park, a 300 acres (1.2 km^{2}) area filled with various species of birds and animals. The tank is named after its builder Mir Alam, Prime Minister of Hyderabad, and comprises a one-mile bund with 21 semi-circular arches.

== University ==
Built during the period of the last Nizam, Mir Osman Ali Khan, the eponymous Osmania University has an imposing facade. After the Independence of India, the city has seen rapid growth in educational institutions, providing many facilities for their students. It also has a number of engineering colleges with proper facilities for the students.

== Culture ==
The city has a distinct culture showing Islamic influences and a courtly presence resulting from its period as the capital of the Nizams, which is more evident in the Old City.

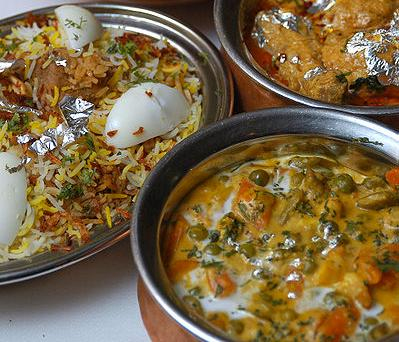
Hyderabadi Biryani

=== Cuisine ===
The Old City has many restaurants offering Hyderabadi cuisine, which is renowned throughout India for being a distinctive regional cuisine. The food is prepared using different types of spices, in which each spice adds a special taste to the food with a modern touch, while preserving the traditional quality of the food. The most famous dishes of Hyderabad are Hyderabadi biryani and Hyderabadi haleem.

=== Language ===
Urdu is the primary language spoken in the Old City area, and was the official language of the Hyderabad State under the Nizams in 1884 AD. The most common dialect of Urdu spoken by the largely Muslim population is known as Dakkhani or Deccani (meaning "language of the Deccan"). Telugu is also widely spoken and understood.

== Demographics ==
The Old City is about 65% Muslim and 30% Hindu. As per the 2011 Census, Christians number 9,687 and Sikhs number 7,166. This stands in contrast to the overall population of Hyderabad district, wherein Hindus comprise about 52% and Muslims 43%.

== Transport ==
The old city is well connected by railway, road, and air. Auto rickshaws are available for getting around the city at reasonable rates while TSRTC city buses circulate within the city and also travel to the nearby towns and villages. The eastern parts of the old city have access to the Hyderabad metro via the Malakpet metro station. Mahatma Gandhi Bus Station is in Old City, Hyderabad and the nearest railway station is Hyderabad Deccan Station, which offers good connections with the rest of India. The newly developed Shamshabad Rajiv Gandhi International Airport lies 6 to 8 kilometres (3.7 to 5.0 mi) from the old city.

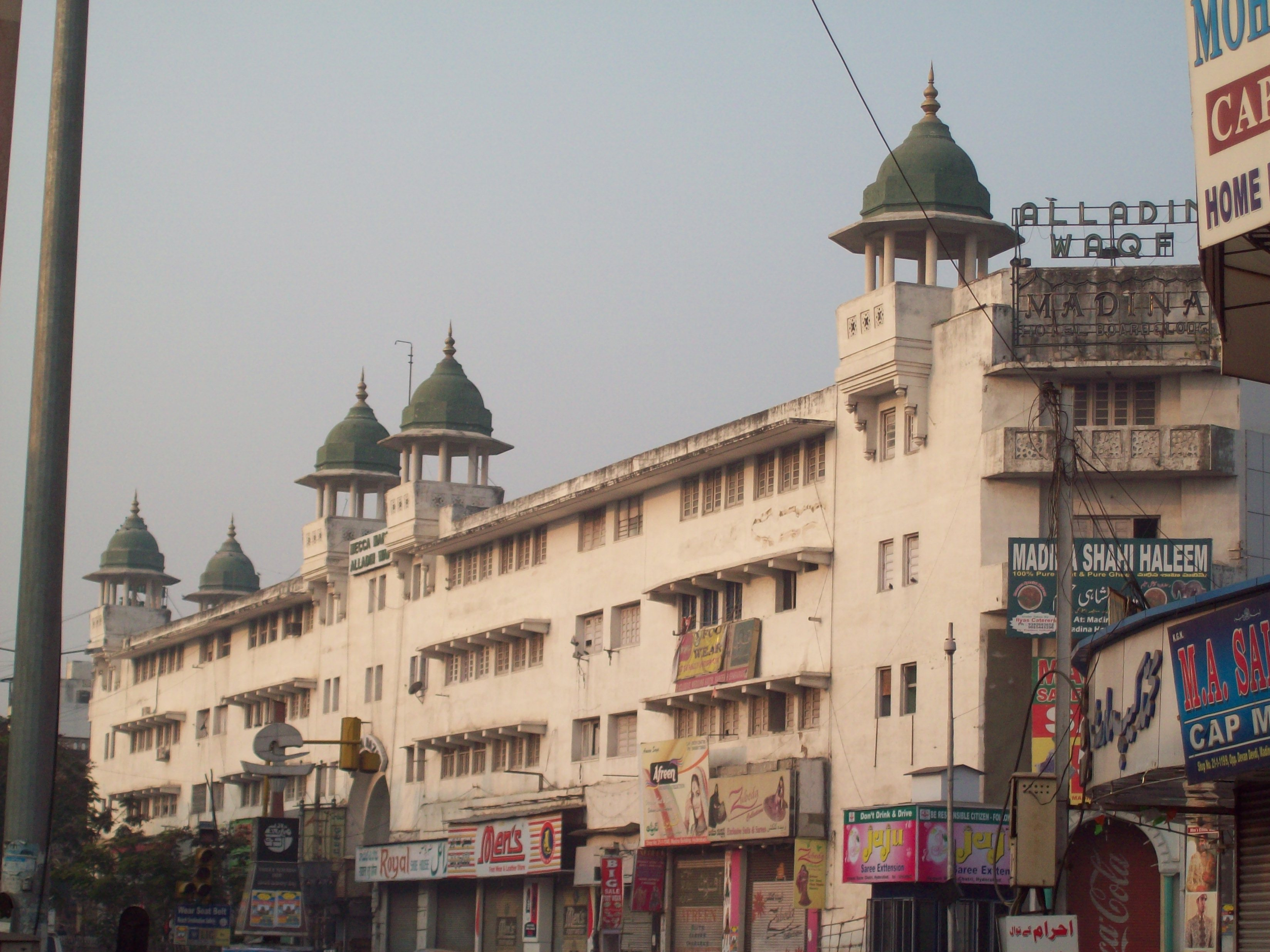
Madina building near Charminar

== Bazaars ==
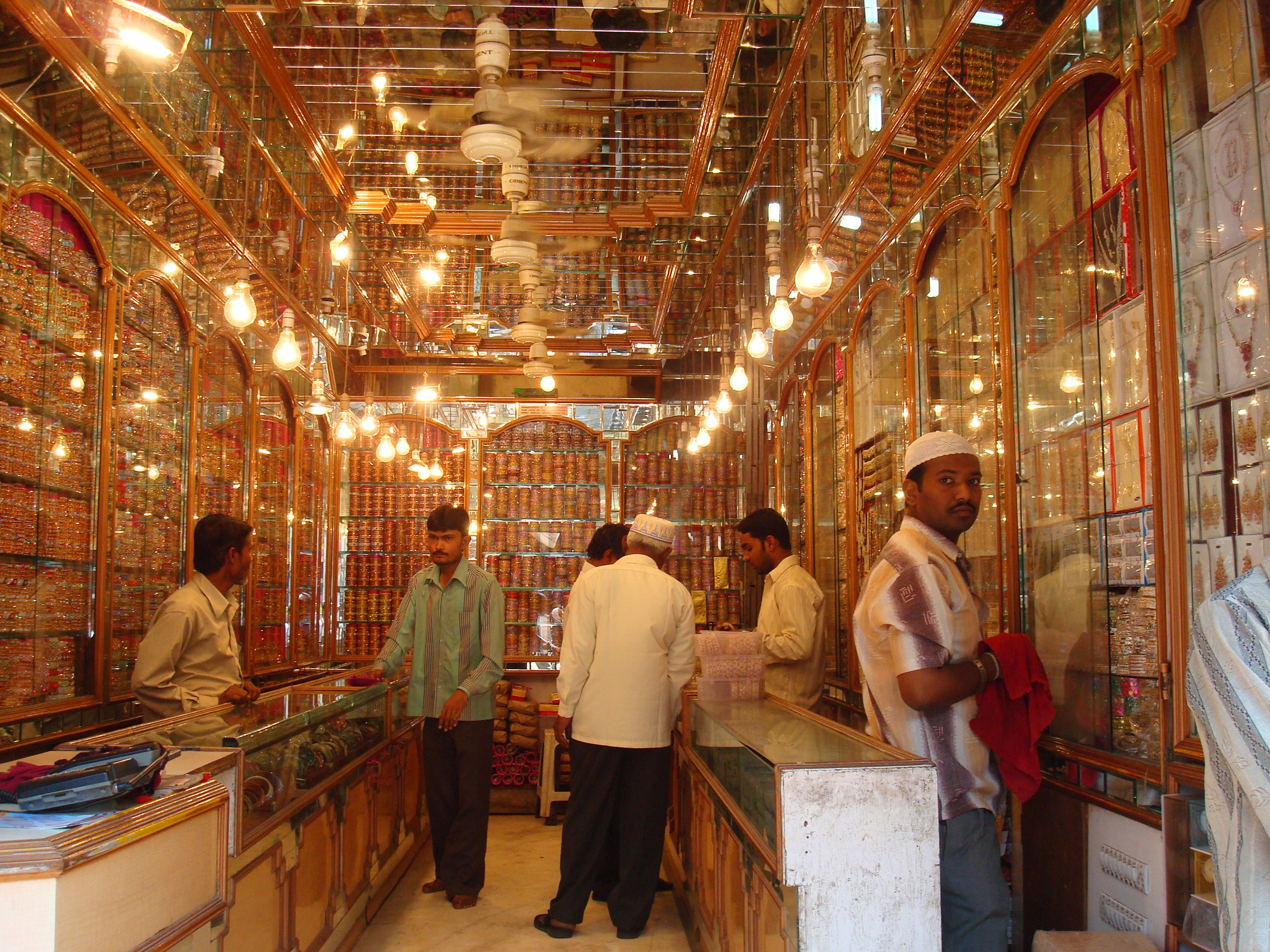
A store at Laad Bazaar selling bangles and jewellery. The Laad Bazar and the Charminar market area are well known for pearls.

Sarojini Naidu describes the Bazaars of Hyderabad in her poem In The Bazaars of Hyderabad.

Hyderabad has been a trading center for centuries and the bazaars of the old city are world-renowned for their pearls, diamonds, and bangles.

The street leading from Charminar to the square on the west is known as Laad Bazaar and is the bridal wear shopping market of the old city. Hyderabadi glass bangles known as Sona Bai are available here. This colourful shopping market of the old city is tucked away in one of the streets leading off from the Charminar. Bangles, bridalwear, pearls, Attar (perfume) and the traditional Hyderabadi glass and stone studded bangles are all sold here. The Madina Market also known as Madina, Hyderabad is known for its wholesale cloth market providing goods from the regions of Telangana, northern Karnataka, and Maharashtra.

The markets of Charminar's Gulzar House are favoured for the gold, diamonds, and pearls with which Hyderabad is synonymous. Cultured pearls studded in gold and silver jewellery of intricate design are a speciality. Pearls come in many shapes and of particular interest is the 'rice-pearl' – a tiny variety. There is also "Basra"; a pearl unmatched in lustre, colour, and price, which is available in select stores. The pearls are sold in strings or raw by weight.

== Problems ==
As the Old City is the oldest part of Hyderabad, it is known often neglected. It has a crumbling infrastructure, and faces issues such as heavy traffic, water scarcity, poor waste management and poor maintenance of buildings. Many heritage structures in the area are also dilapidated and in need of restoration.

== Gallery ==
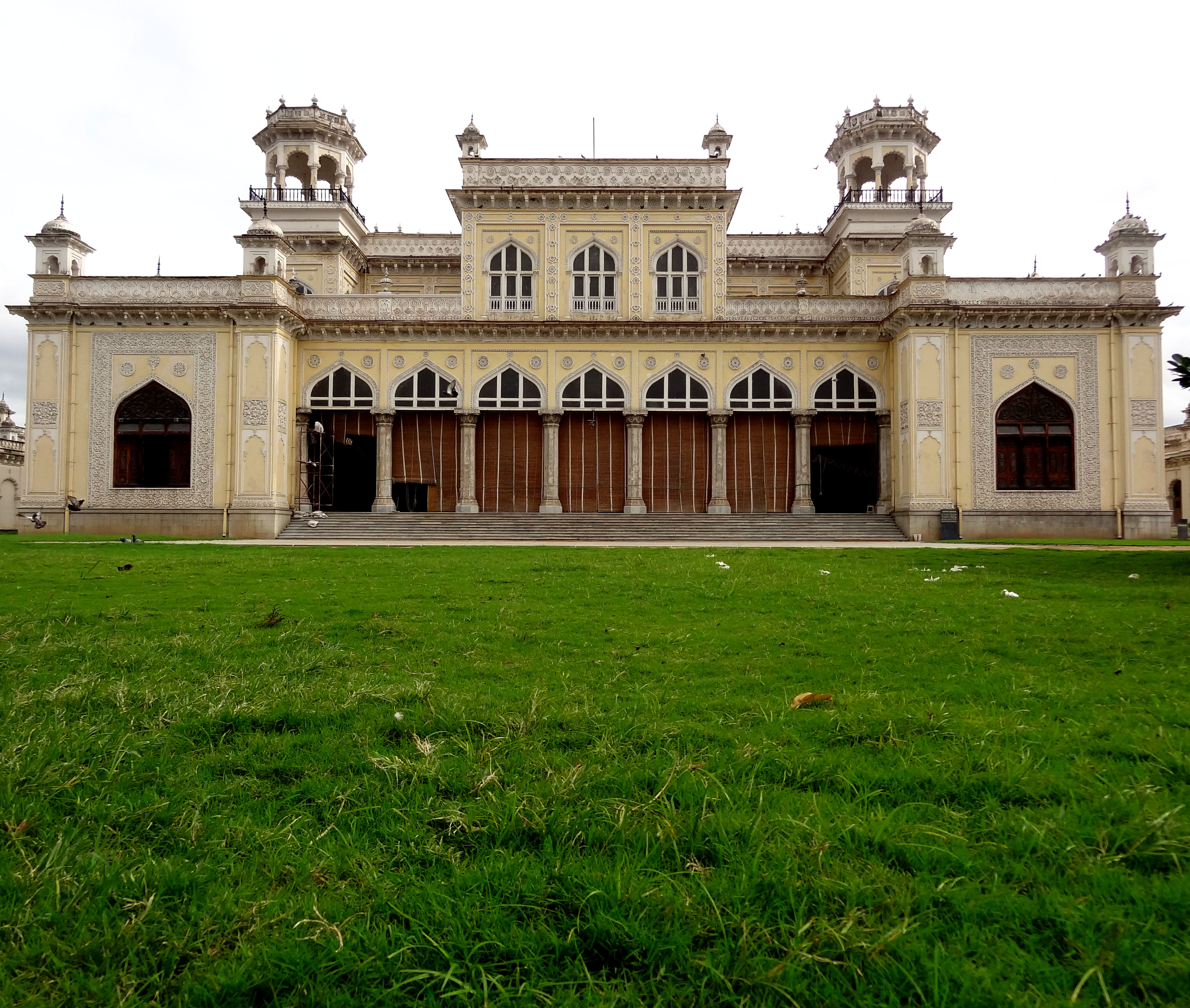
Chowmahalla Palace

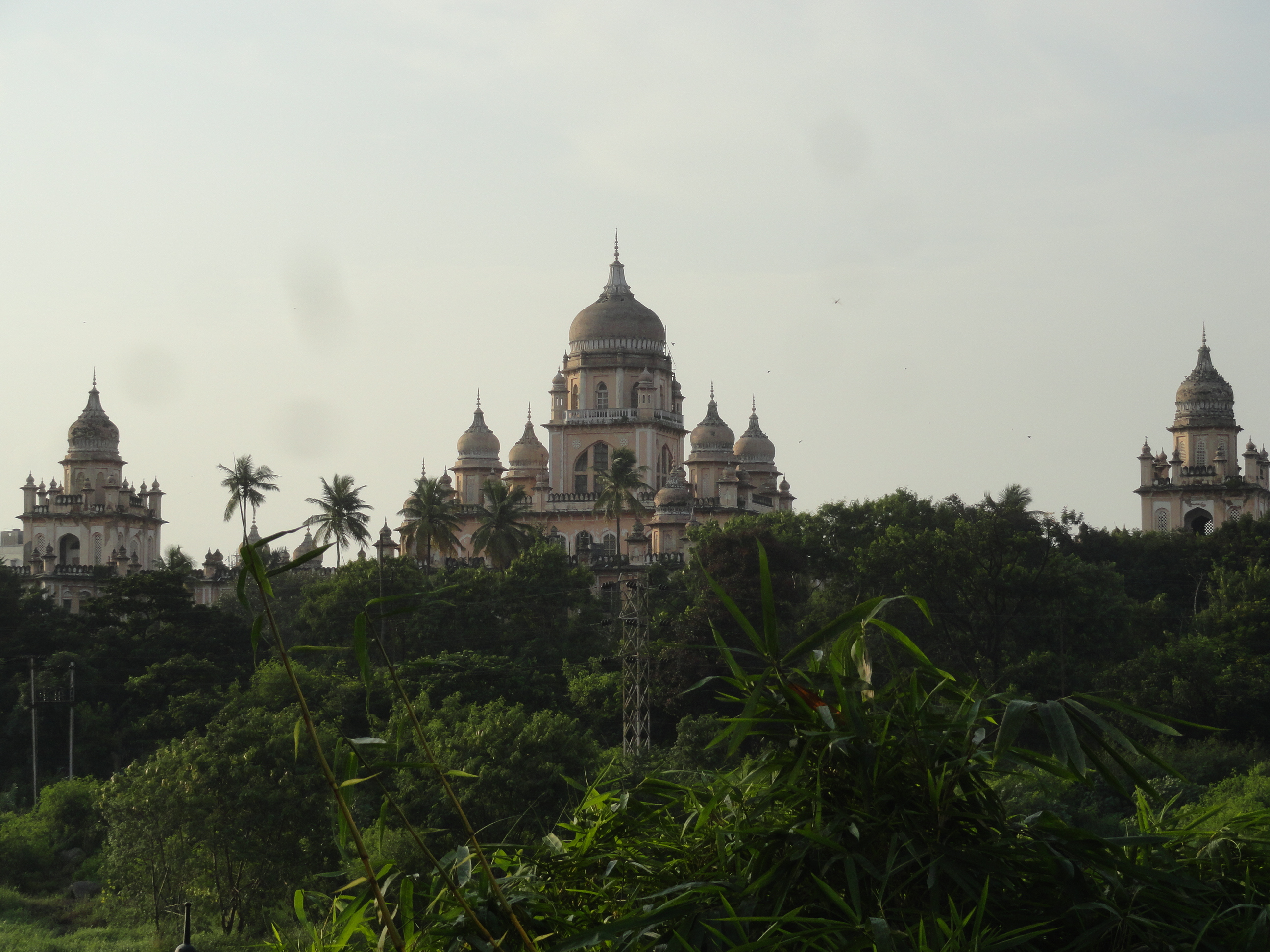
Osmania General Hospital

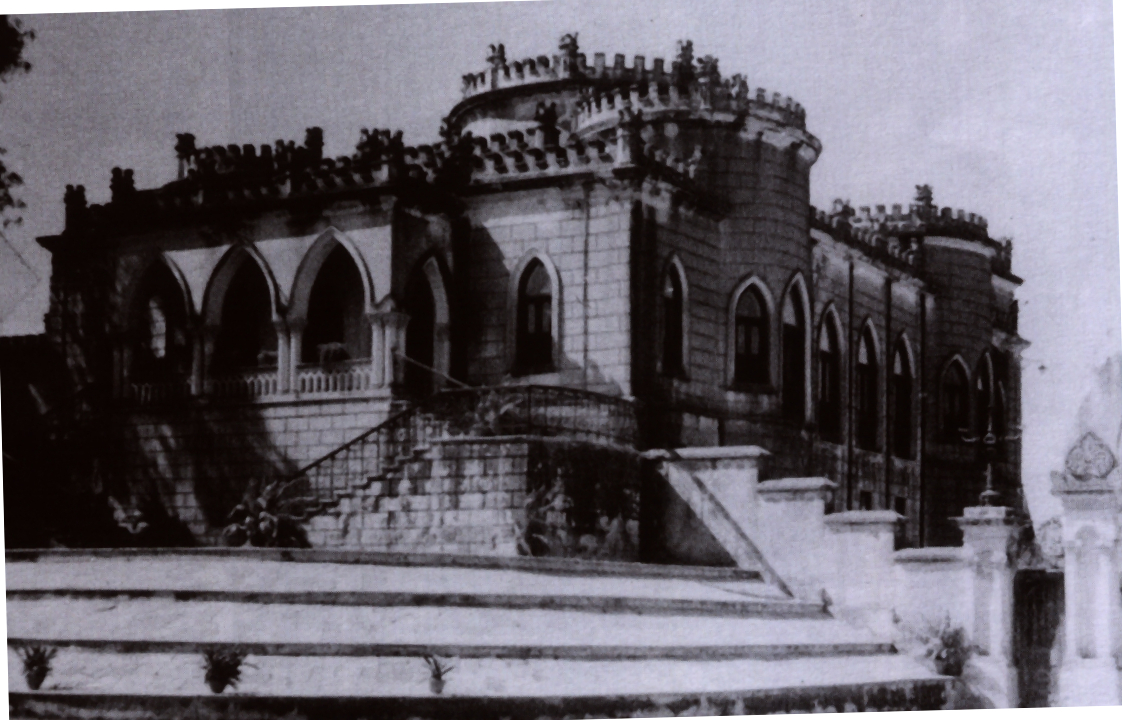
Asman Gadh Palace of Paigah Nawab

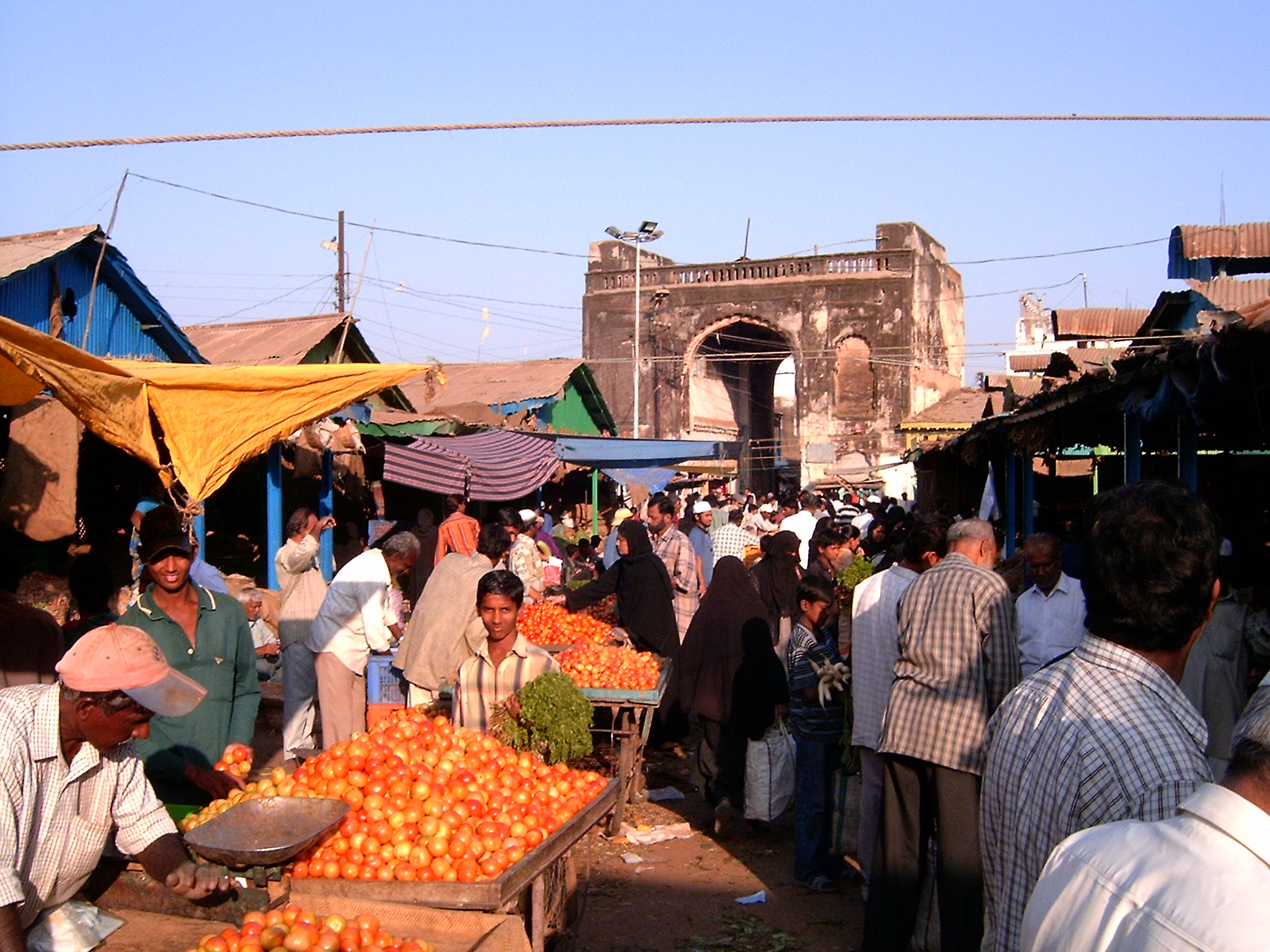
Mir Alam Mandi, a vegetable market

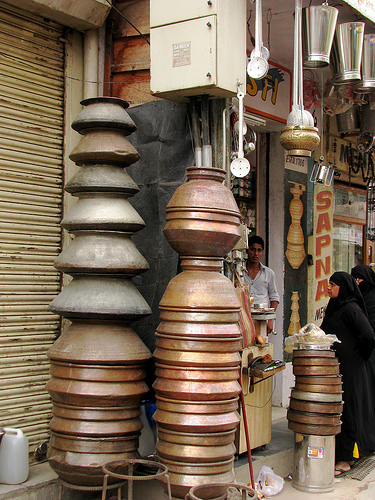
Copper household utensils shop in Laad Bazaar

== See also ==
- Hyderabad state
- List of tourist attractions in Hyderabad
- List of million-plus cities in India
