= Moghalpura =

- Neighbourhood
- Location in Telangana, India Moghalpura (Telangana) Moghalpura (India)
- Coordinates: 17°21′30″N 78°28′35″E
- Country: India
- State: Telangana
- District: Hyderabad
- Metro: Hyderabad

Government
  - Body: GHMC

Languages
  - Official: Telugu, Urdu
- Time zone: UTC+5:30 (IST)
- PIN: 500 002
- Vehicle registration: TG
- Lok Sabha constituency: Hyderabad
- Vidhan Sabha constituency: Charminar
- Planning agency: GHMC
- Website: telangana.gov.in

Moghalpura is one of the oldest neighbourhoods in Hyderabad, India, dating back to the Qutub Shahi era. It is part of the old city of Hyderabad. This neighbourhood is very close to the historic Charminar.

== Transport ==
Moghalpura is connected by buses run by TSRTC, and since a bus depot is close by, it is well connected.

The closest MMTS train station is at Dabirpura.
