= Purana pul =

Purana Pul
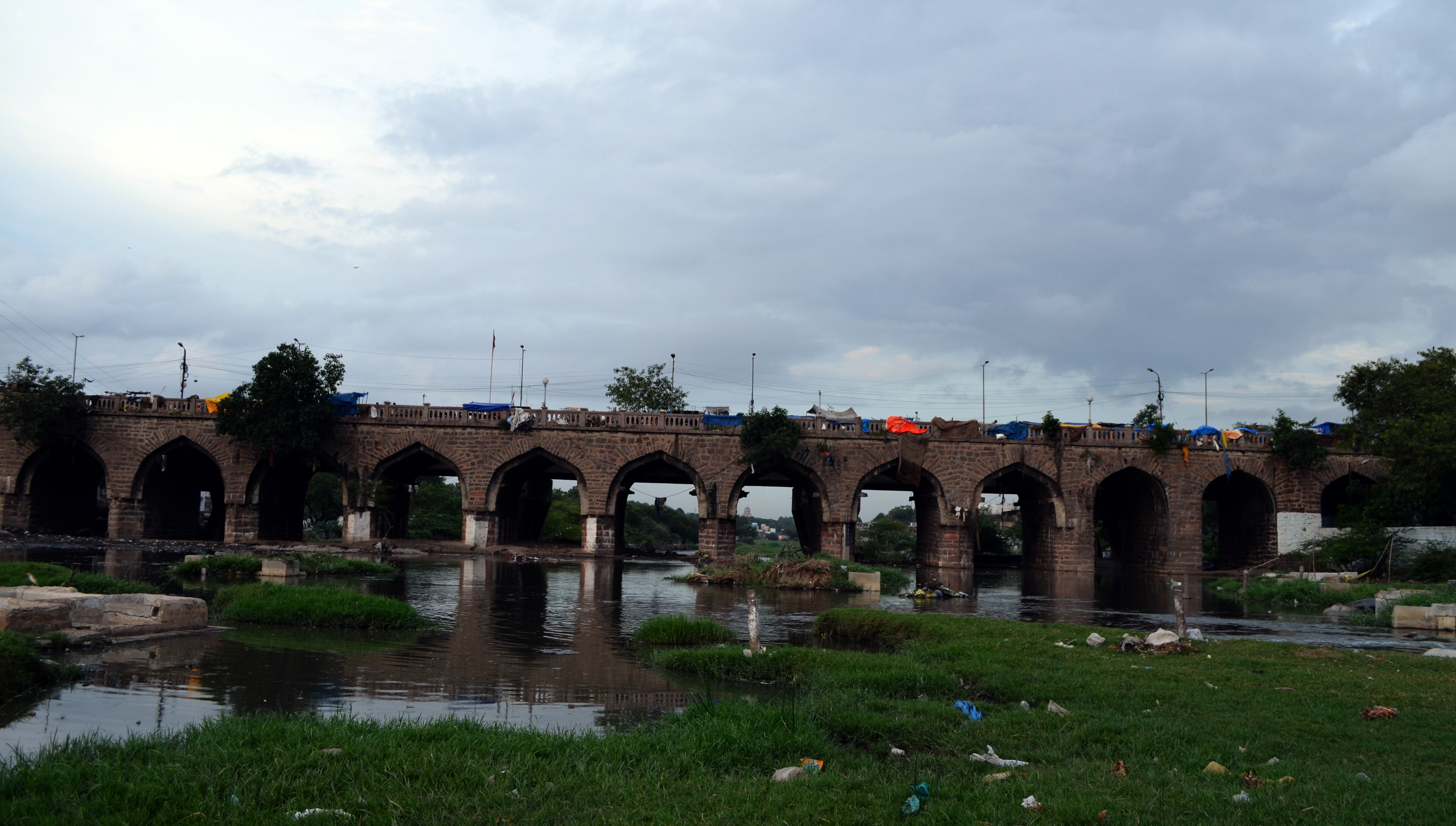
- Coordinates: 17°22′03″N 78°27′30″E
- Carries: pedestrians
- Crosses: Musi River
- Locale: Hyderabad, Telangana, India

Characteristics
- Total length: 600 ft
- Width: 35 ft

History
- Inaugurated: 1578; 448 years ago CE

Location
- Interactive map of Purana Pul

Purana Pul (meaning old bridge in English), built in 1578 AD is a bridge over river Musi in Hyderabad, Telangana, India. It is the first bridge ever constructed in Hyderabad and among the oldest in South India.

It was built during the reign of Qutub Shahi dynasty, to connect Golconda and Hyderabad. The bridge is now defunct, and is used as a vegetable market but remains one of the oldest landmarks of Hyderabad. It was the only surviving bridge after the Great Musi Flood of 1908.

== History ==
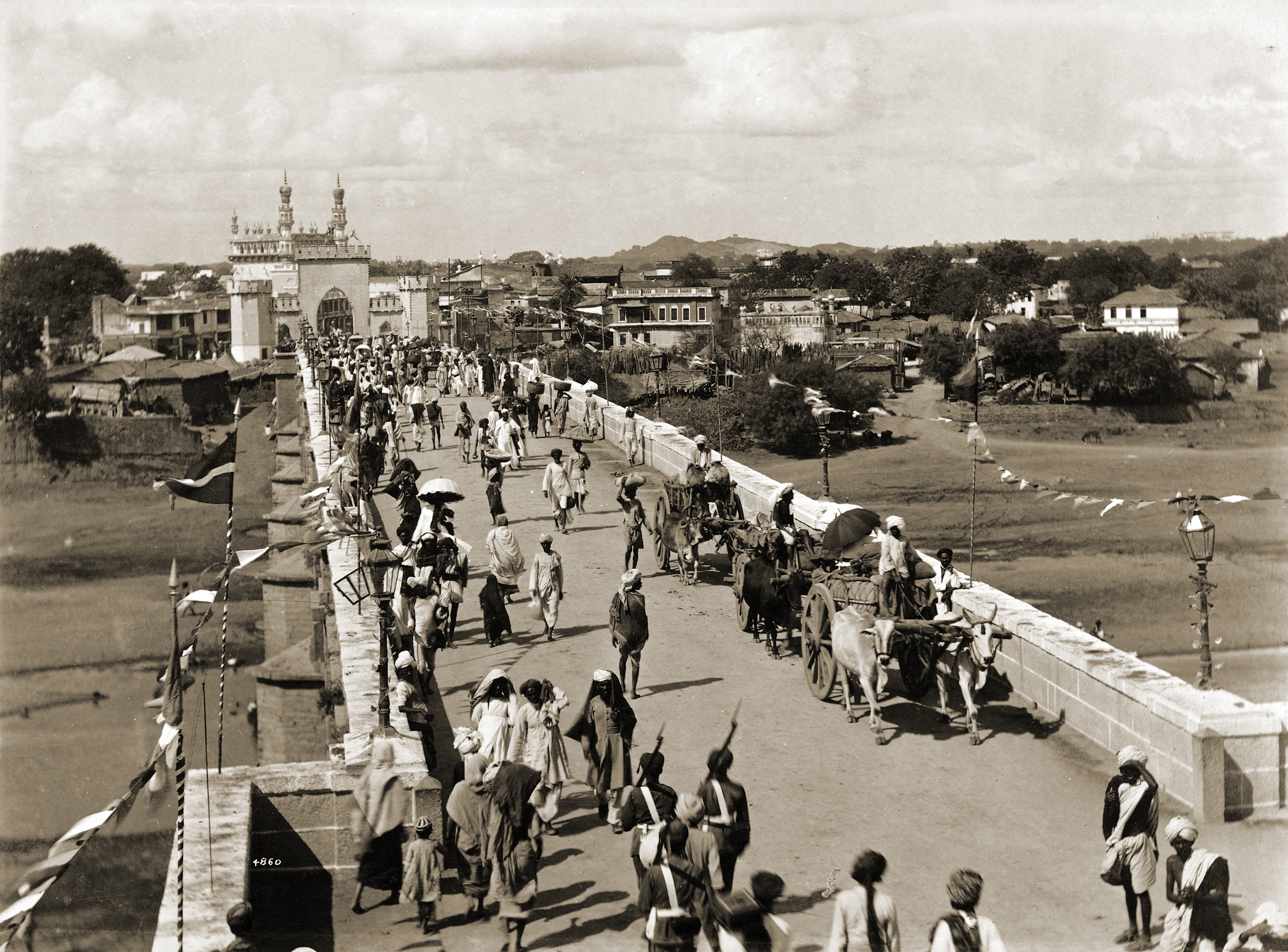
People crossing the Purana Pul, c. 1880s. The Purana Pul Darwaza is seen at the end of the bridge.

Prince Muhammad Quli Qutb Shah was in love with Bhagmati, a Hindu woman who lived on the other side of river Musi. His father Sultan Ibrahim Quli Qutub Shah decided to build the bridge so that his son could cross over the river safely. For this reason, it was also known as 'Pyar-ana pul' (meaning 'On Love Bridge' in English).

== The Bridge ==
The bridge has 22 arches and is 600 feet long and 35 feet broad and 54 feet above the riverbed. The government organised Valentine's Day in the year 2000 on this bridge, which is recognised as the bridge of lovers.

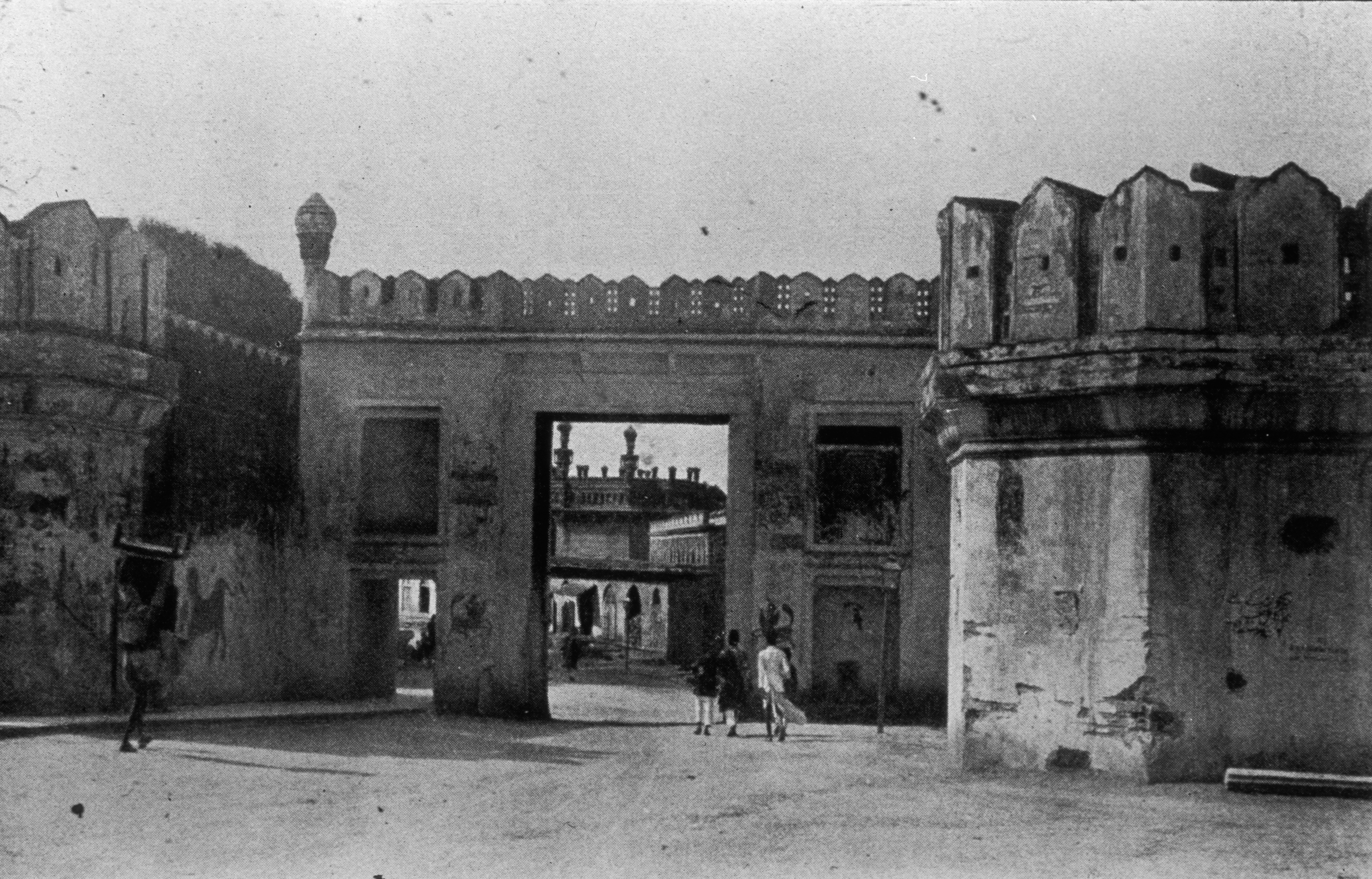
View of Purana Pul Darwaza in 1920

== Purana Pul Darwaza ==
There is a gateway called the Purana Pul Darwaza (lit: "Old bridge door") at the end of the bridge. It is one of the two surviving gateways of the city of Hyderabad, which was then enclosed by a city wall.
