= Afzal Gunj =

Neighbourhood in Hyderabad, Telangana, India

- Neighbourhood
- Location in Telangana, India Afzal Gunj (Telangana) Afzal Gunj (India)
- Coordinates: 17.373247°N 78.470932°E
- Country: India
- State: Telangana
- District: Hyderabad District
- Named after: Afzal ad-Dawlah, Asaf Jah V

Government
  - Body: GHMC

Languages
  - Official: Telugu
- Time zone: UTC+5:30 (IST)
- PIN: 500 012
- Vehicle registration: TG
- Lok Sabha constituency: Hyderabad Lok Sabha constituency,
- Vidhan Sabha constituency: Goshamahal Assembly constituency
- Planning agency: GHMC
- Website: telangana.gov.in

Afzal Gunj is one of the neighbourhoods located on the border of central Hyderabad and the Old City, Hyderabad, Telangana, India, close to river Musi. Afzal Gunj is the hub of local transportation due to the presence of Central Bus Station in the region. The bus station provides services to most parts of the city.

The famous Osmania General Hospital, Telangana State Central Library and Telangana High Court are located here. Other landmarks such as the Charminar and nearby monuments, Purani Haveli, and the Salar Jung Museum are located nearby.

== History ==
The 5th Nizam, Afzal ad-Dawlah, gifted land to grain merchants for trade and commerce. The place is named after him. A lot of markets like Moazzam Jahi Market, Siddi Amber Bazar, Usmangunj Market, Begum Bazar, and Pool Bagh mushroomed in this area.

== Accessibility ==
The TSRTC has a major bus hub in this area and connects Afzal Gunj with all parts of the city including Dilsukhnagar, Gachibowli, Ghatkesar, Himayat Nagar, Jubilee Hills and some of the suburban villages. The malakpet and MGBS metro stations are nearby.

The nearest MMTS Train station is at Malakpet, about 2 km from Afzal Gunj.

The domestic and international Hyderabad Airport is located south of the place about 17 km away. Areas under Afzal Gunj include Begum Bazaar, Siddiambar Bazar and Padmashali Colony.
