= Hyderabad Samachara =

Newspaper

In British India, Hyderabad Samachara was a newspaper published by His Exalted Highness Mir Osman Ali Khan in the year 1941. This was published in Kannada, Marathi, Telugu and Urdu languages. The period of publication was monthly.

The topics covered included district news, messages from the government, precautions to be taken during the war, advertisements, and historical locations within the state.

To prevent fake publications from misleading the citizens, the newspaper was printed on paper with a watermark of the State symbol.
