= Great Musi Flood of 1908 =

1908 natural disaster in India

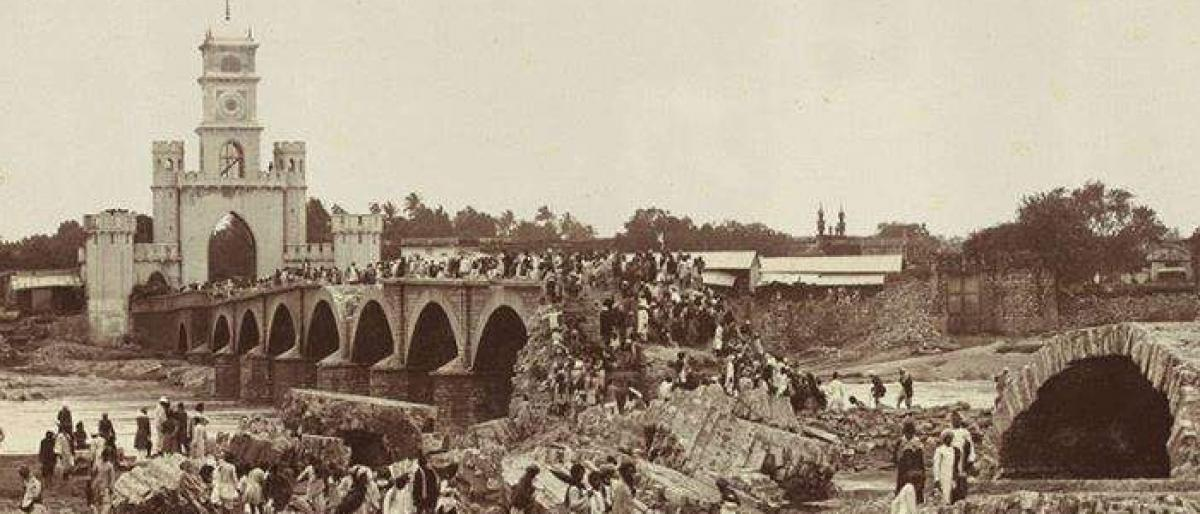
- Refugees walk across a bridge with the Afzal Darwaza in the background, during the Great Musi Flood of 1908
- Date: 28 September 1908 – 29 September 1908
- Location: Hyderabad, Hyderabad State, British India (now in Telangana, India)
- Deaths: >15,000
- Property damage: £1,250,000 (over £104 million in 2021)

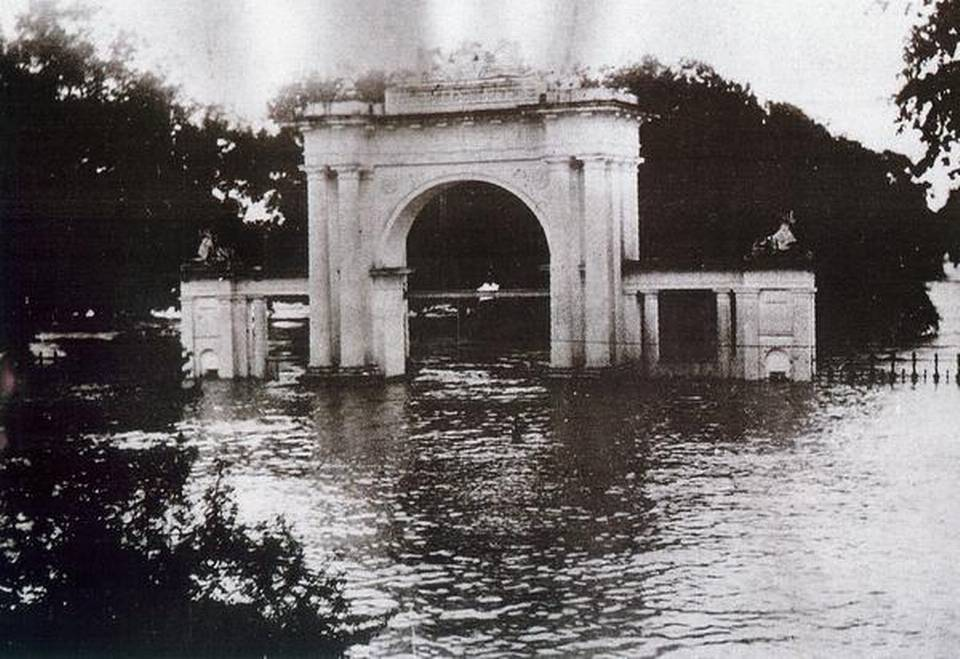
The arched gateway of the then British Residency, partially in water during the Great Musi Flood of 1908

The Great Musi Flood was a devastating flood that occurred on 28 September 1908 in Hyderabad on the banks of the Musi River, in British India. The city of Hyderabad was the capital of the Hyderabad State, ruled by the Nizam, Mir Mahbub Ali Khan.

The flood, locally known as Thughyani Sitambar, shattered the life of the people living in Hyderabad, killing 50,000 people It washed away three bridges — the Afzal, Mussallam Jung and Chaderghat, such that the Puranapul became the only link between the two parts of the city.

== Flooding of Hyderabad ==
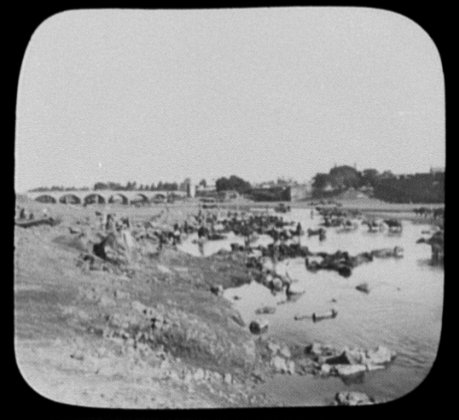
Musi River scene in 1895

The Musi River was the cause of frequent flood devastation of Hyderabad city until the early 20th century. It had begun to swell dangerously on 27 September. The first flood warning came at 2 AM when the water flowed over Puranapul bridge. By 6 AM there was a cloudburst. The flood breached on Tuesday, 28 September 1908: the river rose 60 feet, flowing through the city. In 36 hours, 17 inches of rainfall was recorded, and the water level at Afzalgunj was about 11 feet (3.4 m) high and in other places even higher.

== Damage ==
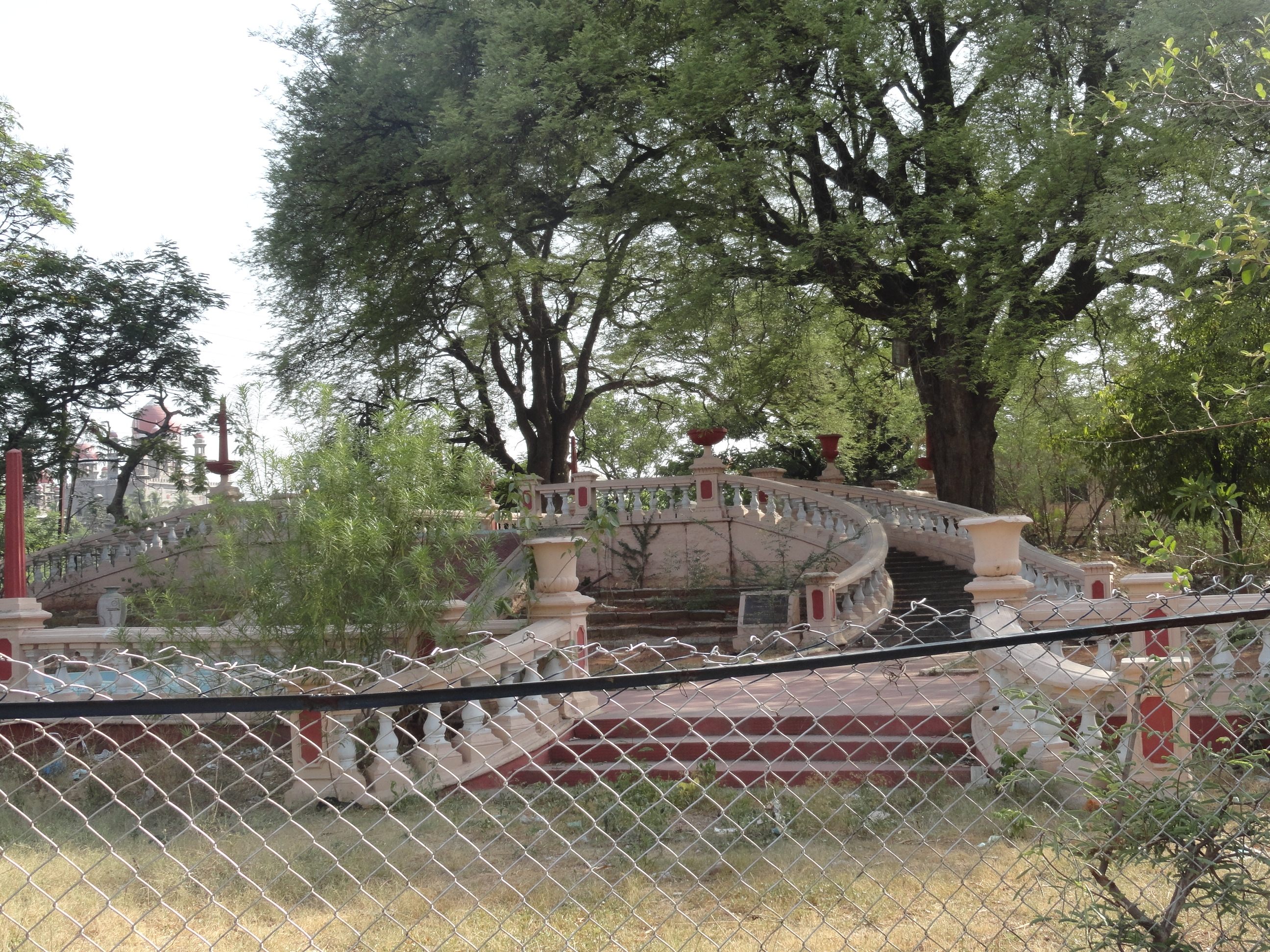
The tamarind tree.

The worst-hit area was Kolsawadi and Ghansi Bazar in Afzal Gunj. The flood razed over 80,000 houses, making a fourth of the population homeless. It completely destroyed the Nizam Hospital, burying the patients. It washed away the Afzal, Mussallam Jung and Chaderghat bridges, all built in the 1860s. Around 15,000 people had died.

Dewastated city pictures after flood

A 200-year-old tamarind tree inside Osmania Hospital saved over 150 people who climbed it. Popular Urdu poet Amjad Hyderabadi, 22, saw his entire family, including his mother, wife and daughter washed away in the flood; he was the only survivor in his family. Most of his Ruba'i, Qayamat-e-Soghra (little doomsday) reflects his depression at the loss. A couplet muses:

Itni Dar'ya May Bhi Na Duba Amjad Dub'nay Valo Ko Bus Ek Chul'lu Kafi Hai

== Relief work and puja done by the Nizam ==
Jhumar Lal Tiwari, the court astrologer of the Hyderabad State advised the Nizam of Hyderabad Asaf Jah VI Sir Mahbub Ali Khan to appease the Goddess as River Musi wreaked havoc through the city on September 28, 1908. In response Nizam Mahbub Ali Khan wore a dhoti, janau and offered puja with fruits, flowers, coconuts, and a silk sari, pearls and gold to the river as per Hindu religious customs, to appease and pacify river Musi. Rivers are considered Goddess in Hindu customs and raging rivers are offered puja to pacify them in Hindu culture.

The Nizam opened the gates of his palace for everyone during the flood crisis. Whoever sought help and relief under his proactive supervision were promptly supported. Elephants and horses were also put in service for relief work by him.

A relief fund of 500,000 Rupees was borne by the state, and 1,000,000 more raised by public subscription, with the Nizam and Kishen Pershad making the largest donations. The government declared an official holiday of ten days for people to deal with their own crises. Ten kitchens were set up in various parts of the city, which were in operation from 29 September to 13 October.

== Aftermath ==
The historic deluge resulted in the development of the twin cities in 1908. This necessitated planned, phased development.

=== Committee recommendations ===
Syed Azam Hussaini submitted his report on 1 October 1909, with recommendations on preventing a recurrence of floods and improving civic amenities. The Seventh Nizam, Mir Osman Ali Khan, constituted a City Improve Trust in 1912. He built a flood control system on the river.

=== Sir Visvesvaraya’s services ===
The Nizam invited M. Visvesvaraya to advise and assist in the reconstruction of the city and to devise measures for the prevention of the recurrence of such a terrible catastrophe. He was assisted by engineers from the Public Works Department of Hyderabad State, and after much investigation and deliberation, they concluded that the immunity of Hyderabad city from flood must come from the construction of flood catchment areas in the basin above the city. They proposed to construct these reservoirs a few miles north of the capital.

A dam was built under noted engineer Nawab Ali Nawaz Jung Bahadur in 1920 across the river, ten miles (16 km) upstream from the city, called Osman Sagar. In 1927, another reservoir was built on Esi (tributary of Musi) and named Himayat Sagar. These lakes prevent the flooding of the River Musi and are major drinking water sources for Hyderabad city.
