= History of Hyderabad =

Hyderabad is the capital of the Indian state of Telangana. It is a historic city noted for its many monuments, temples, mosques and bazaars. A multitude of influences have shaped the character of the city in the last 400 years.

The city of Hyderabad was founded by the Qutb Shahi sultan Muhammad Quli Qutb Shah in 1591. It was built around the Charminar, which formed the centrepiece of the city. Hyderabad became an important trading centre for diamonds and pearls, and a centre for culture.

After a brief period of Mughal rule, in 1724, Asaf Jah I defeated Mubariz Khan to establish autonomy over the Deccan Suba, named the region Hyderabad Deccan, and started what came to be known as the Asaf Jahi dynasty. Subsequent rulers retained the title Nizam ul-Mulk and were referred to as Asaf Jahi Nizams, or Nizams of Hyderabad. Nizam I never formally declared independence from the Mughals; he still flew the Mughal flag, and was never crowned. In Friday prayers, the sermon would be conducted in the name of Aurangzeb, and this tradition continued until the end of Hyderabad State in 1948. The Nizams later signed a subsidiary alliance with the British, and their territory became Hyderabad State, the largest princely state in British India with the city of Hyderabad as its capital.

After India's independence in 1947, the Nizam did not wish to accede his state to the newly formed nation. By then, his power had weakened due to the Telangana rebellion. Hyderabad State was integrated into the Indian Union in 1948. In 1956, the Hyderabad State was divided on the basis of linguistic differences, and the city of Hyderabad became the capital of Andhra Pradesh.

== Ancient history ==
Archaeologists excavating near the city have unearthed Iron Age sites that can be dated to 500 BCE. Megalithic sites dating back to 2nd century BC have been excavated. Prominent amongst these sites are at Hasmathpet. Megalithic sites have also been discovered at Moulali, Kothaguda, Hyderabad Central University campus. Later in 2008 a new site was discovered at Kethepalli near Ramoji Film City. The area around Hyderabad was ruled by the Mauryan Empire in the third century BCE during the reign of Ashoka the Great. After the death of Ashoka (232 BCE), as the Maurya Empire began to weaken and decline, the Sātavāhanas who started out as feudatories to the Mauryan dynasty, declared independence and established their empire in this region. The Sātavāhana Empire was a royal Indian dynasty based from Kotilingala in Telangana as well as Junnar (Pune) and Prathisthan (Paithan) in Maharashtra. The territory of the empire covered much of the Deccan Plateau and central India for 450 years, i.e., from 230 BCE onward until around 220 CE. After the decline of the Satavahana Empire in 210 CE, the region came under the rule of the Ikshvaku dynasty (225 CE – 325 CE), the successors of the Satavahanas in eastern Deccan.

== Medieval history ==
Various Buddhist and Hindu kingdoms ruled the area during the subsequent centuries. The area was ruled by the Kalyani branch of the Chalukya kings. When the Chalukya kingdom became weaker, Kakatiyas, who were feudal chieftains of Chalukya, declared independence and set up their kingdom around Warangal.

The Kakatiyas built the Golkonda Fort in the vicinity of Hyderabad as part of their western defenses along the lines of the Kondapalli Fort. The city and the fortress were built on a granite hill that is 120 metres (390 ft) high, surrounded by massive battlements. The fort was rebuilt and strengthened by Rani Rudrama Devi and her successor Prataparudra.

The fall of Warangal to Muhammad bin Tughluq's forces from the Delhi Sultanate in 1321 CE brought anarchy to the region. Later, the Golkonda fort came under the control of the Musunuri Nayaks, who defeated the Tughlaqi army occupying Warangal. For the next few decades, the Bahmani Sultanate of the Deccan fought the Musunuri Nayakas on the north and the Vijayanagara Rayas on the south for control of the region. The Golkonda fort was ceded by the Musunuri Kapaya Nayak to the Bahmani Sultanate as part of a treaty in 1364. By the middle of the 15th century, the region was under the firm control of the Bahmani Sultanate, which controlled the Deccan north of the Krishna River from coast to of sultanate.

Under the Bahmani Sultanate, Golkonda slowly rose to prominence. Sultan Quli Qutb-ul-Mulk (r. 1487–1543), sent as a governor of Telangana, established it as the seat of his government around 1501. Bahmani rule gradually weakened during this period, and Sultan Quli formally became independent in 1538, establishing the Qutb Shahi dynasty based in Golkonda. Over a period of 62 years, the mud fort was expanded by the first three Qutb Shahi sultans into the present structure, a massive fortification of granite extending around 5 km in circumference. It remained the capital of the Qutb Shahi dynasty until 1590 when the capital was shifted to the present city of Hyderabad.

=== Timeline ===
Chalukya dynasty (624–1075), Kakatiya dynasty (1158–1321), Khalji dynasty (1290–1320), Tughlaq dynasty (1320–1414), Musunuri Nayakas (1336–1365), Bahmani Sultanate (1347–1527), Qutb Shahi dynasty (1518–1687), Mughal Empire (1526–1857), Asaf Jahi dynasty 1724–1948, Republic of India (1948-till date).

== The Qutb Shahi dynasty (1518–1687) ==
The Qutb Shahi Monuments of Hyderabad

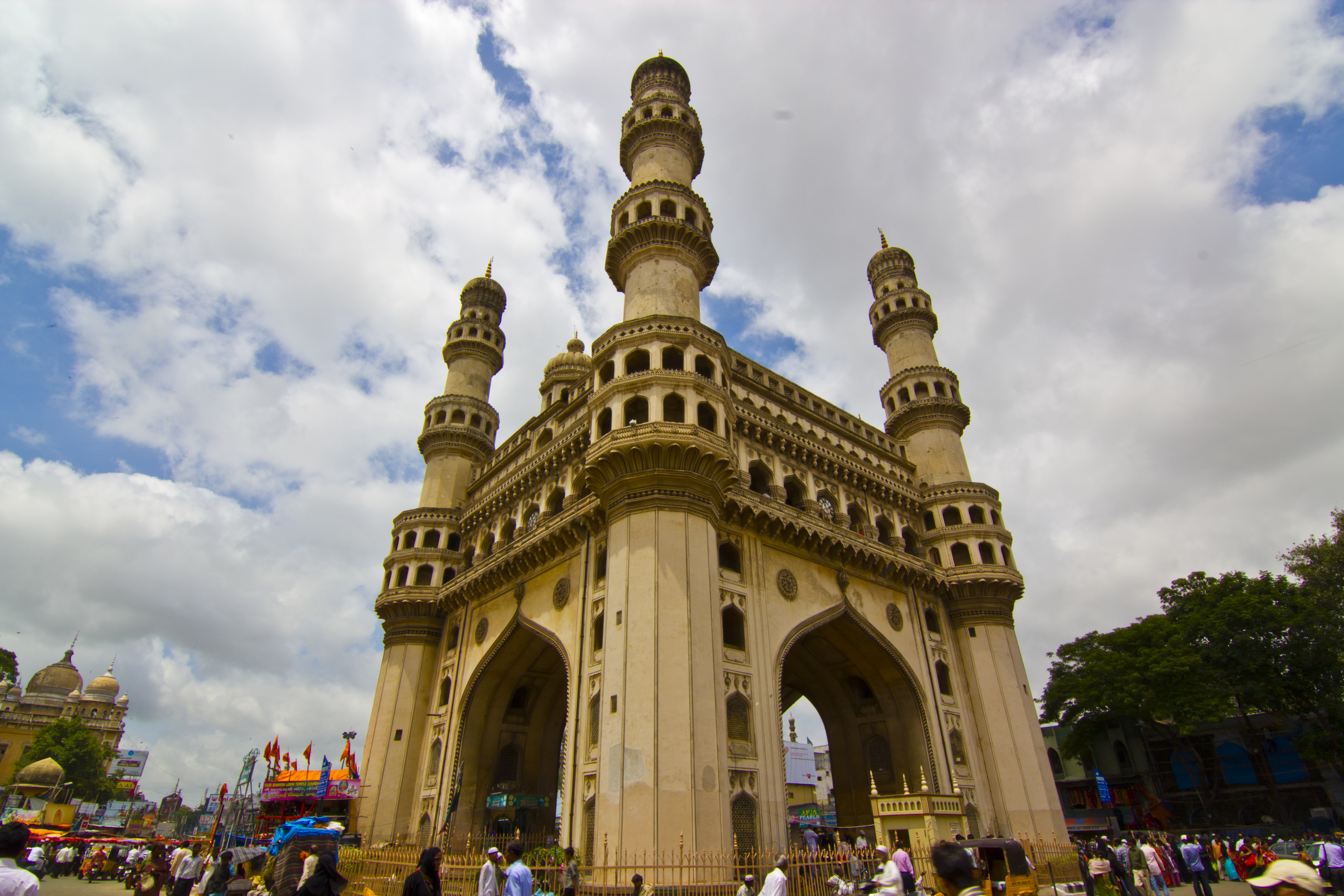
Charminar

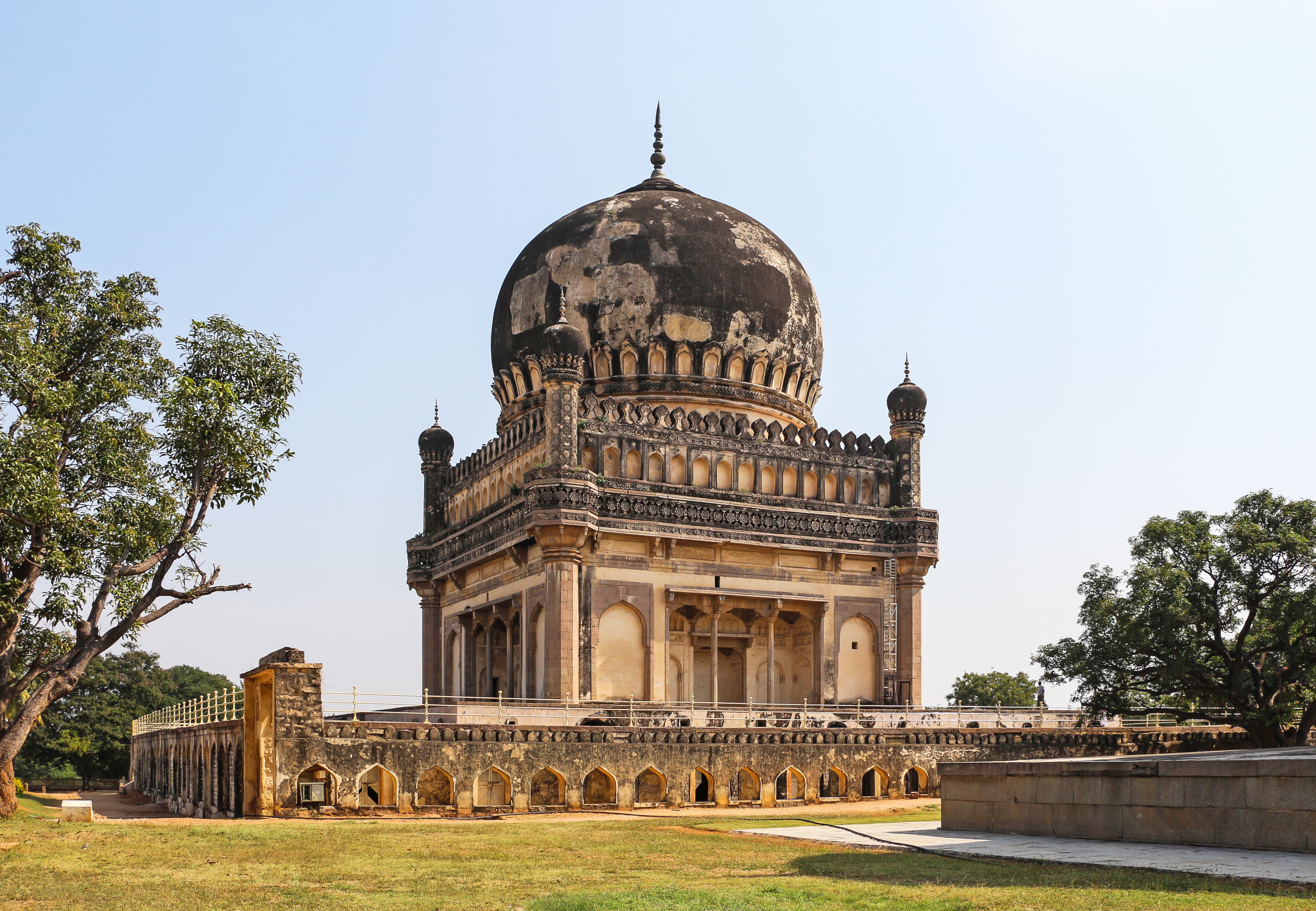
One of the Qutb Shahi tombs

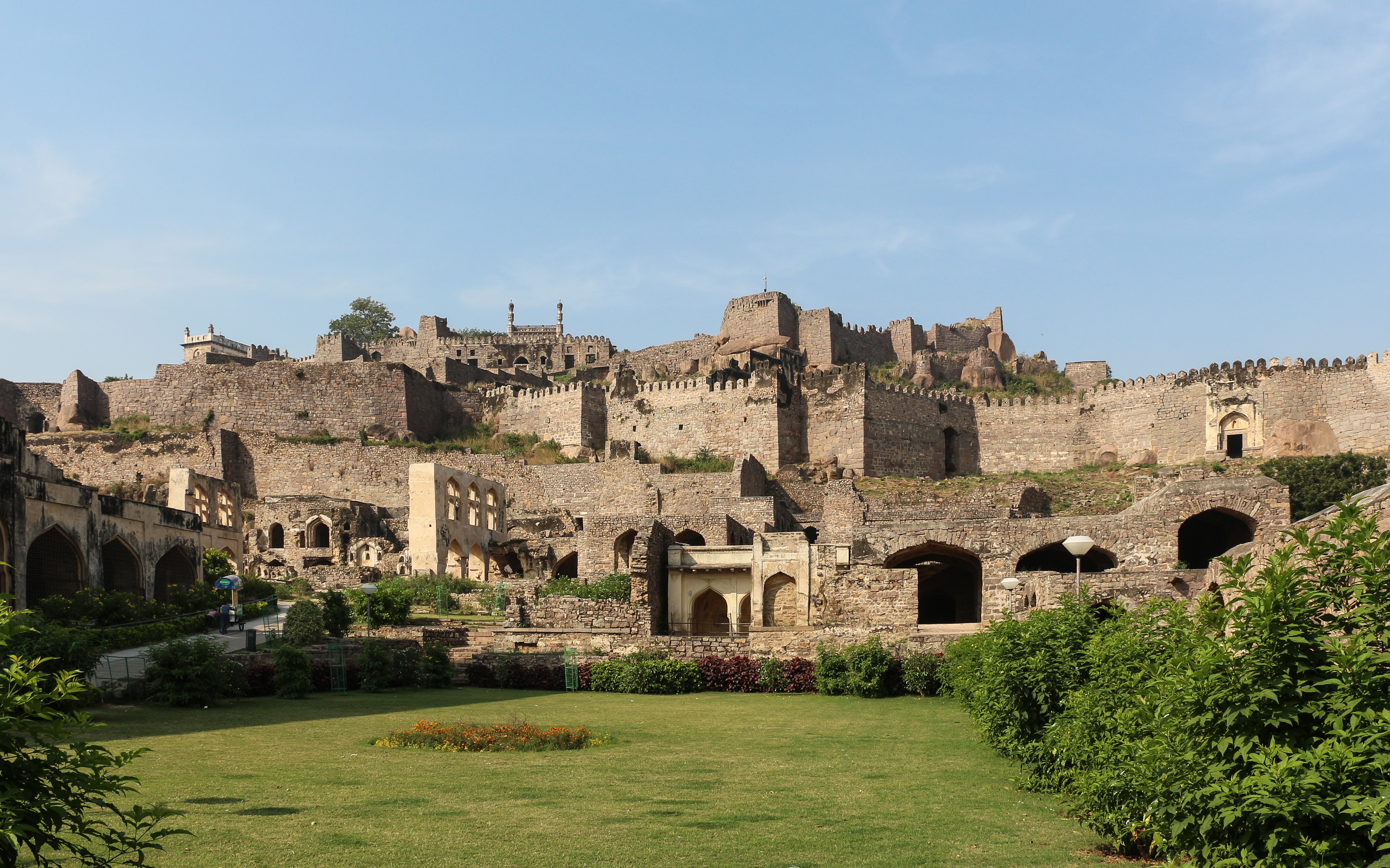
Golconda Fort

The Qutb Shahi Monuments of Hyderabad were submitted by India in the tentative list for UNESCO World Heritage status in 2011.

=== Establishment of the Golconda Sultanate ===
In 1463, Sultan Muhammad Shah Bahmani II dispatched Sultan Quli Qutb-ul-Mulk to the Telangana region to quell disturbances. Sultan Quli quelled the disturbance and was rewarded as the administrator of the region. He established a base at Kakatiya hill fortress of Golconda, which he strengthened and expanded considerably. By the end of the century, Quli ruled from Golconda as the subedar (governor) of the Telangana region. Quli enjoyed virtual independence from Bidar, where the Bahmani sultanate was then based.

In 1518, when the Bahmani Sultanate disintegrated into five different kingdoms, with the others based in Ahmednagar, Berar, Bidar and Bijapur. Sultan Quli declared independence from the Bahmani Sultanate and established the Golconda Sultanate under the title "Sultan Quli Qutub Shah", he rebuilt the mud-fort of Golconda and named the city Muhammad Nagar.

The Hussain Sagar lake was built during the reign of Ibrahim Quli Qutb Shah, the fourth Sultan of the dynasty, in 1563. It was named after Hussain Shah Wali, who helped design it.

=== Founding of Hyderabad ===
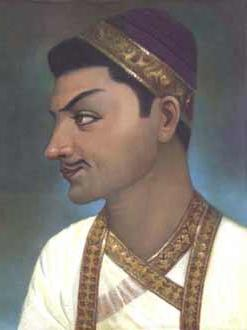
Portrait of Muhammad Quli Qutb Shah

In 1589, Muhammad Quli Qutb Shah, the fifth ruler of the Qutb Shahi dynasty, selected the present site of the city and established the city of Hyderabad at the banks of the Musi river to overcome water shortages experienced at Golconda. The Purana Pul (old bridge) enabled quick travel between Golconda and Hyderabad.

There are various theories about the naming of the city. One popular theory suggests that the sultan had named the city "Bhaganagar" or "Bhāgyanagar" after Bhāgmathi, a local nautch (dancing) girl with whom he had fallen in love. She converted to Islam and adopted the title Hyder Mahal. The city was renamed Hyderabad in her honour. According to another source, the city was named after Haidar, the son of Quli Qutb Shah. Historians dismiss the theory of dancing girl as a "figment of the imagination" that lacks a "shred of evidence". According to the Hyderabad-based historian Capt. Panduranga Reddy (retd) who studied the city's origin, "It is all fiction that Hyderabad was ever named Bhagyanagar or that it was named after the lover of Mohammad Quli Qutb Shah. Hyderabad was actually built much later around a small village called Chichulam."

The architectural historian Pushkar Sohoni theorised the foundation of several cities in the Deccan in this period. According to him, Hyderabad was founded in 1591 to decongest Golconda, which was growing rapidly. In addition, the changing nature of economic organisation and warfare technology required mercantile and civilian settlements to be disaggregated from the fortified military and political centres. Andrew Petersen, a scholar of Islamic architecture, says the city was originally called Baghnagar (city of gardens).

He ordered the construction of the Charminar in 1591. The construction of the nearby Makkah Masjid was also started during his reign, but would not be completed for a hundred years. Mir Momin Astarabadi, the prime minister in the Qutub Shahi period, developed the plan of the city of Hyderabad, including the location of the Charminar and Char Kaman.

=== Growth of the new city, Hyderabad ===
The early history of Hyderabad is inextricably intertwined and fortune rose during the 16th and early 17th centuries, Hyderabad became a center of a vibrant diamond trade. All eight Qutb Shahi sultans were patrons of learning and were great builders. They contributed to the growth and development of Indo-Persian and Indo-Islamic literature and culture in Hyderabad. Some of the sultans were known as patrons of local Telugu culture as well. During the Qutb Shahi reign Golconda became one of the leading markets in the world for diamonds, pearls, steel, arms, and also printed fabric. In the 16th century, the city grew to accommodate the surplus population of Golconda and eventually became the capital of the Qutb Shahi rulers. Hyderabad became known for its baghs (gardens) and its comfortable weather.

== Mughal conquest and rule (1687–1724) ==
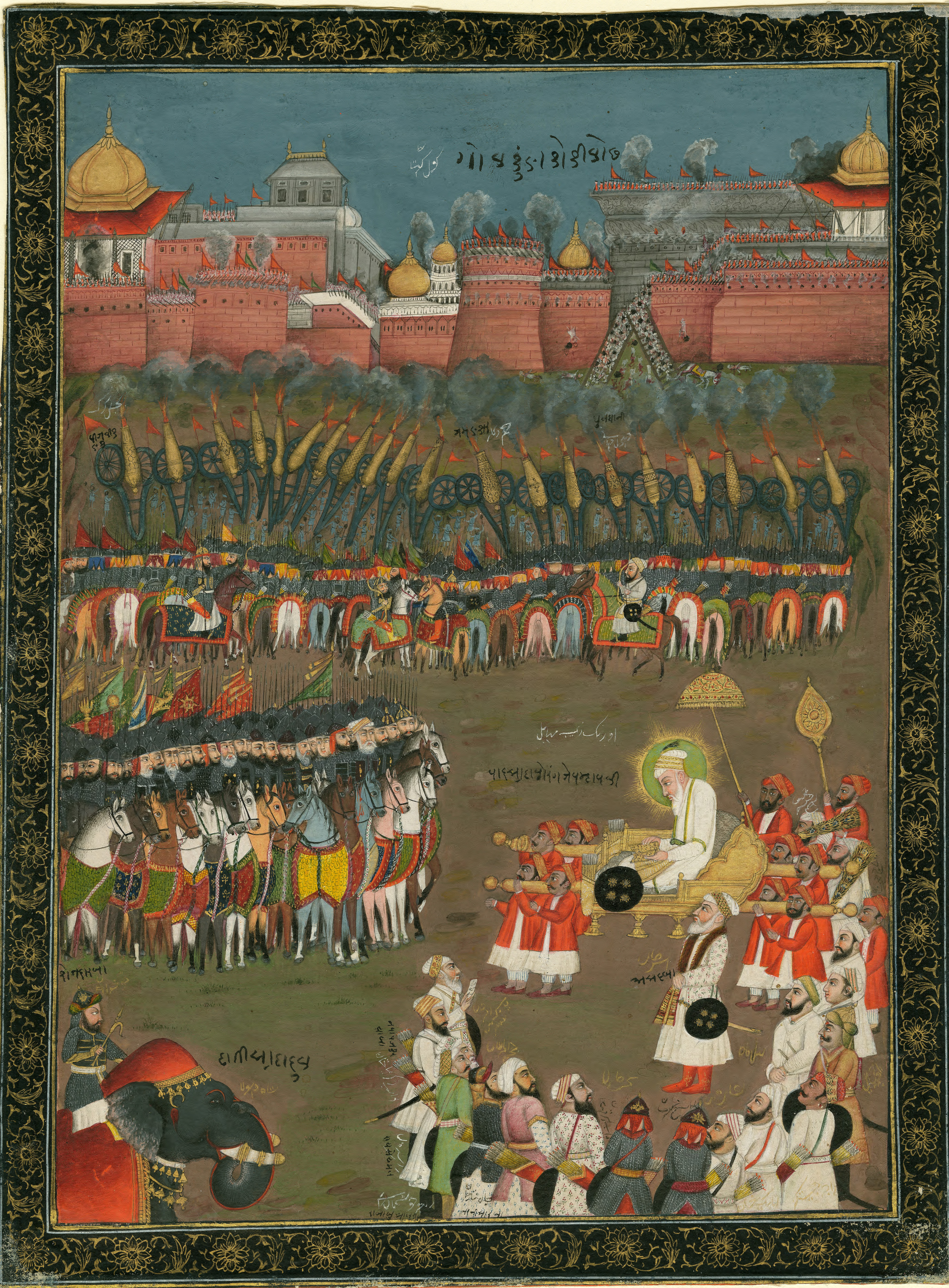
Aurangzeb during the Siege of Golconda, 1687

By the mid-17th century, politics in the Deccan were ready for yet another tectonic shift. Mughal prince Aurangzeb spent most of his time in the Deccan fighting local Hindu and Muslim kingdoms to establish and enforce Mughal sovereignty. After the death of Shah Jahan in 1666, Aurangzeb consolidated his power in Delhi as Emperor and returned to the south. He spent most of his imperial reign in military camps in the Deccan, in an almost desperate campaign to expand the empire beyond the greatest extent it had reached under Akbar. The biggest prize in his eyes was the rich city of Hyderabad, protected by the reportedly impregnable fort of Golconda.

Aurangzeb with his commanders Khwaja Abid Siddiqi (Qulich Khan) and the latter's son Ghazi-ud-Din Feroze Jung laid siege to Golconda in 1686. Golconda held fast under months of siege, and Aurangzeb had to retreat in frustration. Aurangzeb returned in 1687 and laid siege for 9 months camping in the Fateh Maidan ("victory field", now the Lal Bahadur Shastri Stadium). Khwaja Abid Siddiqi died in these war and was buried at Kismatpur near Attapur, Hyderabad. Local legend has it that the fortress held on, but the gates were opened at night by a saboteur Abdullah Khan Pani who was bribed by Aurangzeb. Hyderabad's independence was eclipsed.

On 21 September 1687, the Golkonda Sultanate came under the rule of the Mughal emperor Aurangzeb after a year-long siege of the Golkonda fort. The annexed city "Hyderabad" was renamed Darul Jihad (House of War), and the main territories of the Golconda Sultanate were made into the province Hyderabad Subah. Mughal rule in Hyderabad was administered by three main governors: Jan Sipar Khan (1688–1700), his son Rustam Dil Khan (1700–13) and Mubariz Khan (1713–24).

Aurangzeb's efforts would turn out largely in vain, with Hyderabad remaining under Mughal rule for less than four decades. During this period, the construction of the Makkah Masjid (which had started in the 16th century) and city wall of Hyderabad with 12 gateways was completed.

For a few decades, Hyderabad declined, and its vibrant diamond trade was all but destroyed. Aurangzeb's attention moved away quickly to other parts of the Deccan, with the Maratha Empire gaining ground against the Mughals.

== The Nizams of Hyderabad (1724–1948) ==
Hyderabad State, (its capital and largest city Hyderabad) under the Nizams of Hyderabad, was the largest princely state in India, with an area larger than England, Scotland and Wales combined. It was considered the "senior-most" princely-state, and within the elaborate protocols of the Raj, its ruler the Nizam was accorded a 21-gun salute. Development of modern facilities and industrialization in Hyderabad city started in the late 19th century. The State had its own currency, mint, railways, and postal system. The Nizam amassed a lot of wealth, as a result of the diamond trade.

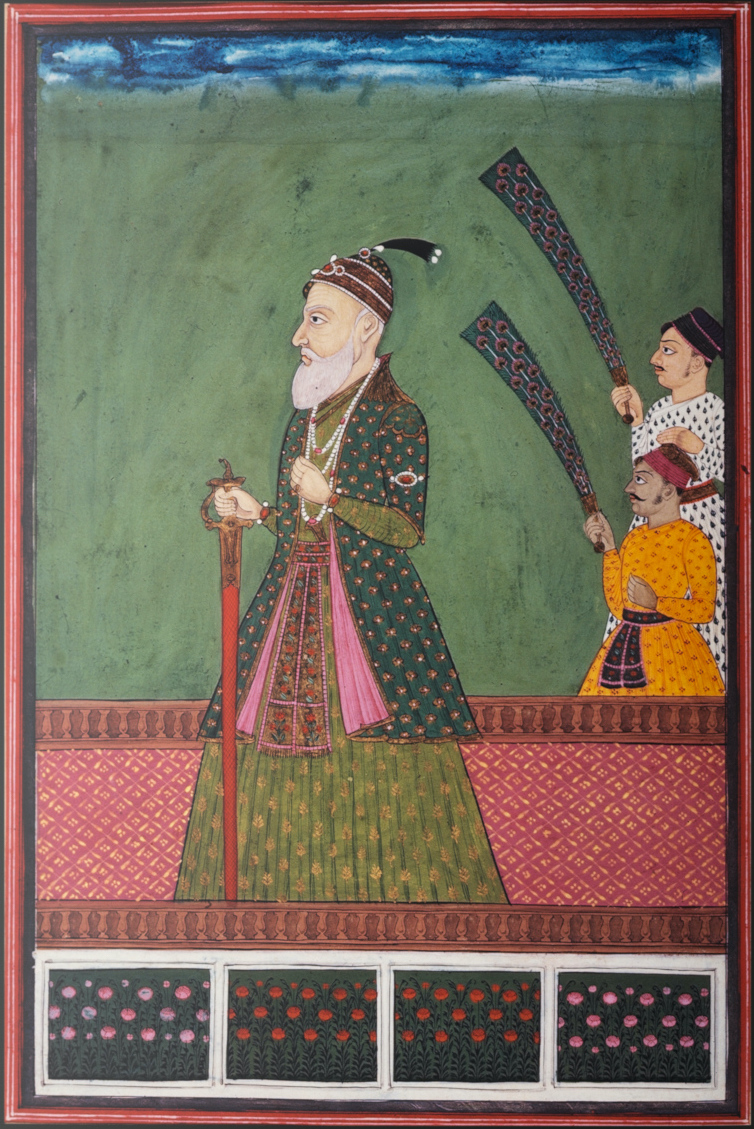
Mir Qamar-ud-din Khan, the first Nizam of Hyderabad

=== Asaf Jah I ===
With the emaciation of the Mughal Empire after Aurangzeb's death in 1707, the Mughal-appointed governors of Hyderabad gained more autonomy from Delhi. In 1714, the Mughal Emperor Farrukhsiyar appointed Mir Qamar-ud-din Siddiqi as the viceroy to the Deccan and gave him the title of Nizam-ul-Mulk (governor of the country). He was well suited for the position as he had fought alongside his father and grandfather who were commanders during the siege of Golconda.

In 1724, he defeated Mubariz Khan to establish control over Hyderabad. He received the title of Asaf Jah from Mughal Emperor Muhammad Shah in the following year. Thus began the Asaf Jahi dynasty that would rule Hyderabad until a year after India's independence from Britain.

=== Successors of Asaf Jah I ===
The death of Asaf Jah I in 1748 resulted in a period of political unrest as his sons, backed by opportunistic neighboring states and colonial foreign forces, contended for the throne. The accession of Asif Jah II, who reigned from 1762 to 1803, ended the instability. In 1768 he signed the Treaty of Machilipatnam, surrendering the coastal region to the East India Company in return for a fixed annual rent.

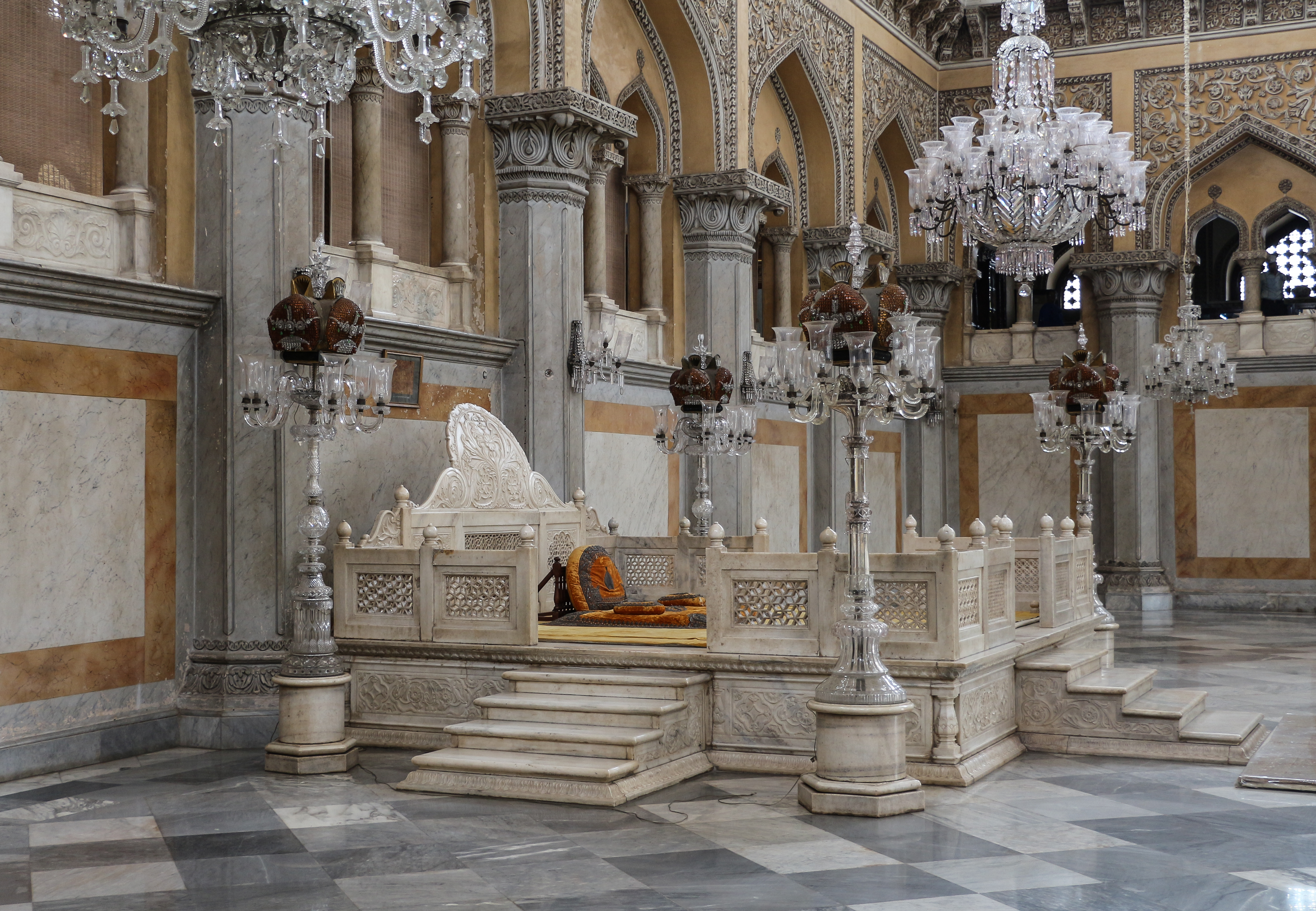
Throne of the Nizam of Hyderabad at Chowmahalla Palace

In 1769 Hyderabad city became the formal capital of the Nizams. In response to regular threats from Hyder Ali (Dalwai of Mysore), Baji Rao I (Peshwa of the Maratha Empire), and Basalath Jung (Asaf Jah II's elder brother, who was supported by the Marquis de Bussy-Castelnau), the Nizam signed a subsidiary alliance with the East India Company in 1798, allowing the British Indian Army to occupy Bolarum (modern Secunderabad) to protect the state's capital, for which the Nizams paid an annual maintenance to the British.

When the British and the French spread their hold over the country, successive Nizams won their friendship without bequeathing their power. The Nizams allied themselves with each side at different times, playing a significant role in the Anglo-Mysore Wars.

During the reign of the third Nizam, Sikandar Jah, the city of Secunderabad was founded to station French troops and subsequently, British troops. The British stationed a Resident at Hyderabad and their own troops at Secunderabad, but the state continued to be ruled by the Nizam. Maintenance of British forces, which was part of subsidiary alliance with British, put heavy burden on Hyderabad state and bankrupted it in the early 19th century.

=== Asaf Jah V ===
Asaf Jah V's reign was marked by reforms by his Prime Minister Salar Jung I, included the establishment of a governmental central treasury in 1855. He reformed the Hyderabad revenue and judicial systems, instituted a postal service and constructed the first rail and telegraph networks. The first higher educational institution of Hyderabad known as Dar-ul-Uloom was established during his reign.

As news of the Indian Rebellion of 1857 reached Hyderabad, Turrebaz Khan and Maulvi Allauddin led rebellions of about 5,000 people and attacked the British Residency. However, this was no match for the superior British troops and the rebellion was quickly crushed.

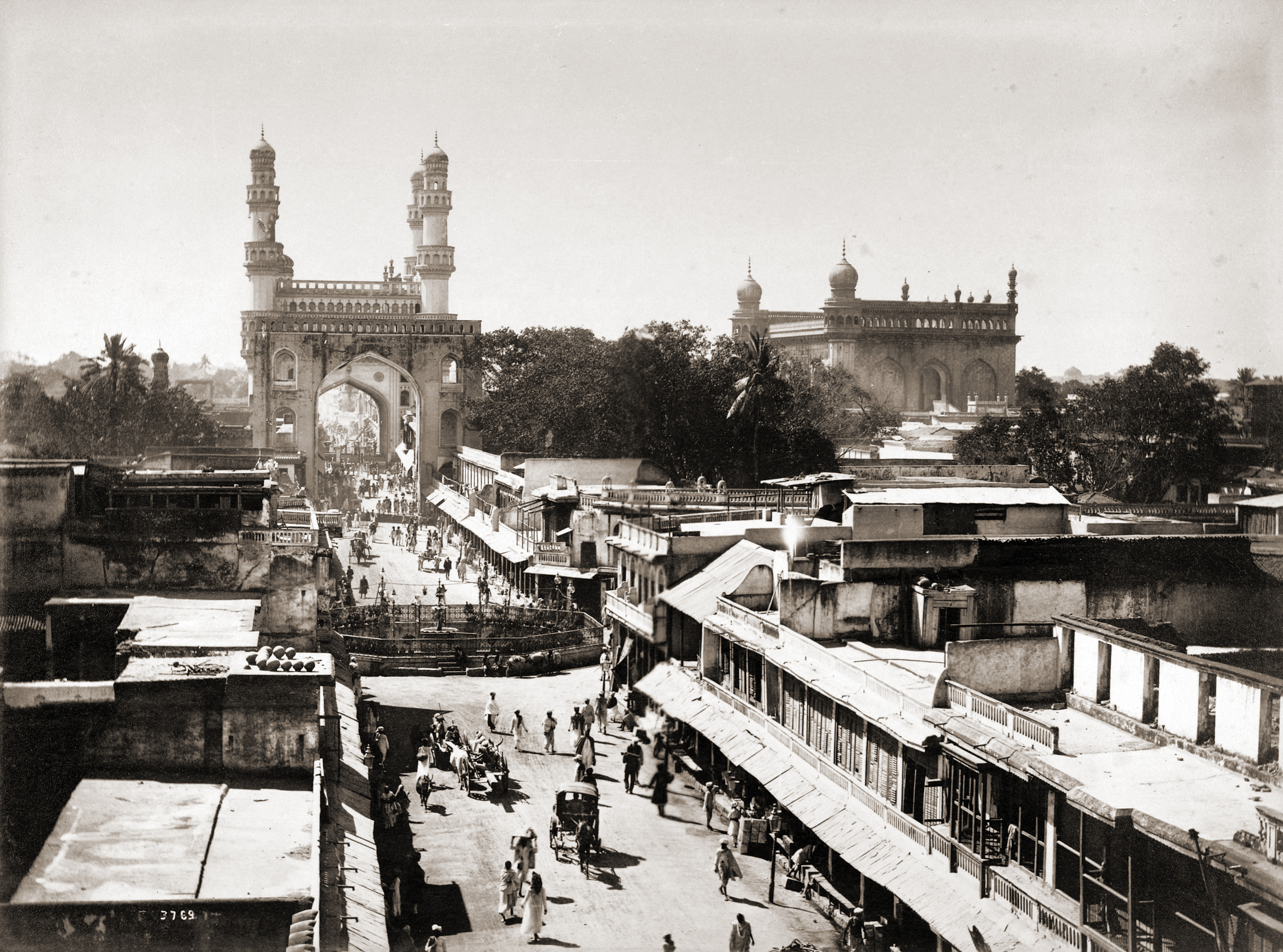
Charminar and its surrounding bazaars. The Mecca Masjid, Char Kaman and Gulzar Houz are also seen.

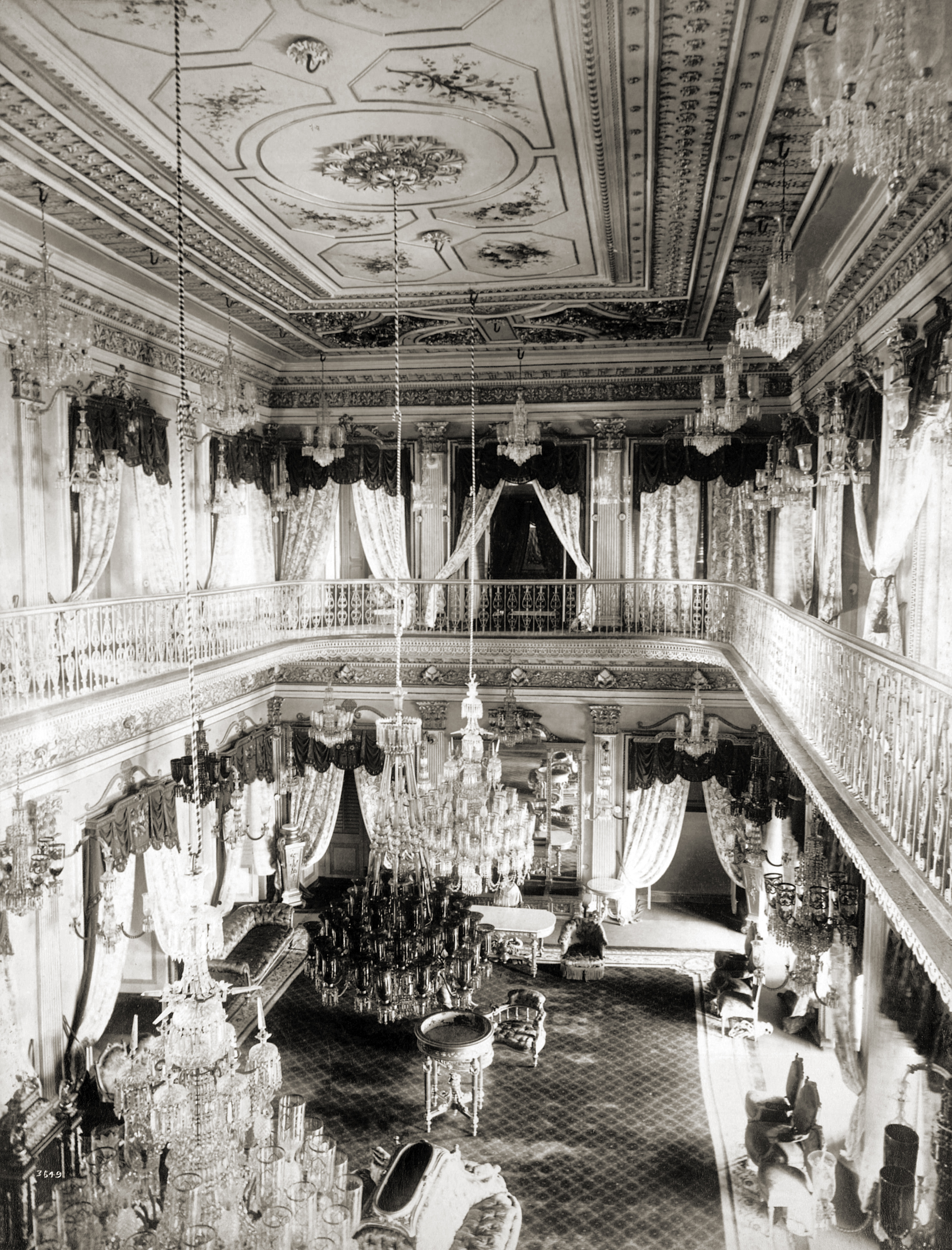
Drawing Room of Chowmahalla Palace, the official residence of the Nizam

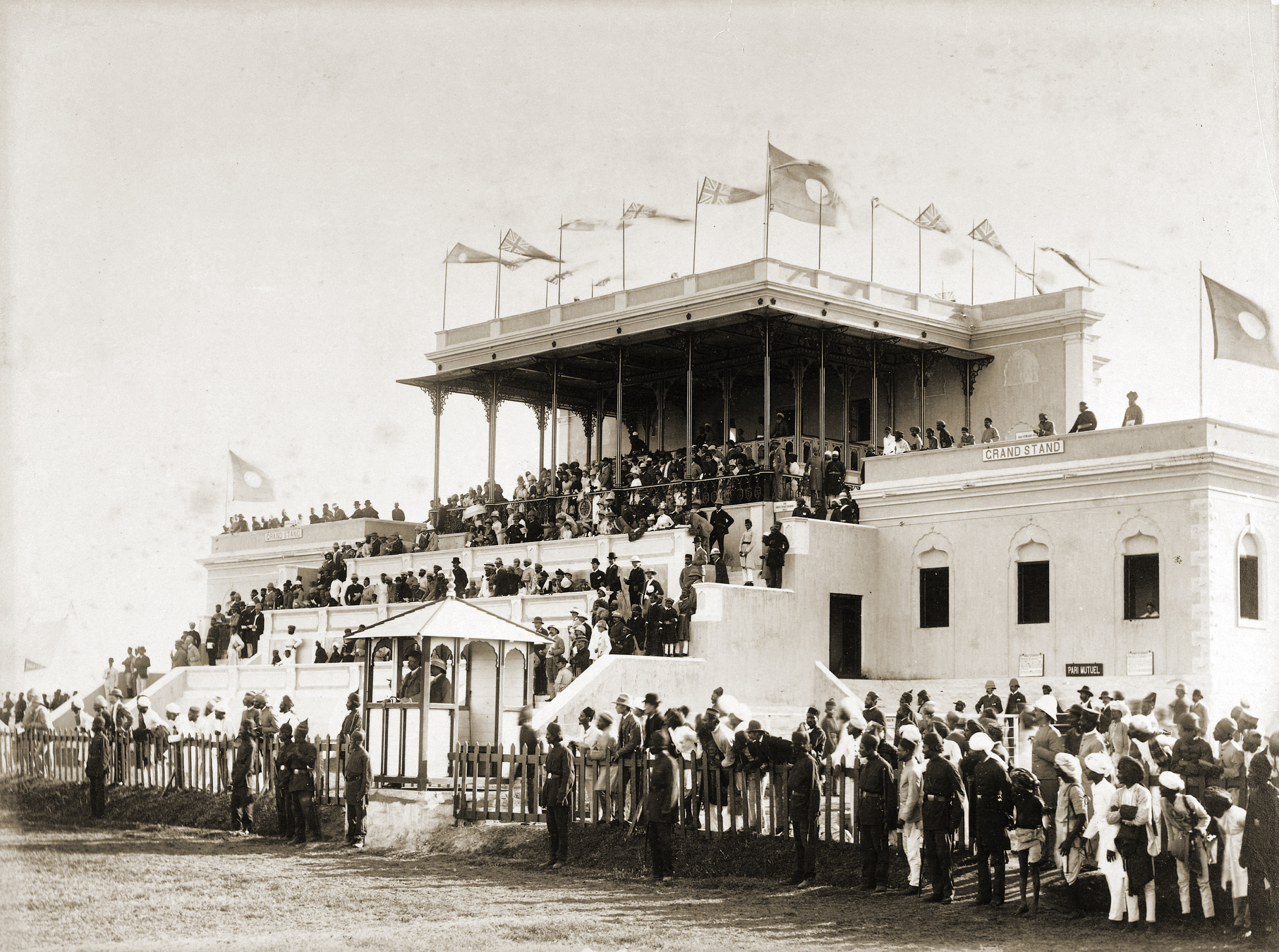
Grand Stand, Hyderabad Race Club, Malakpet

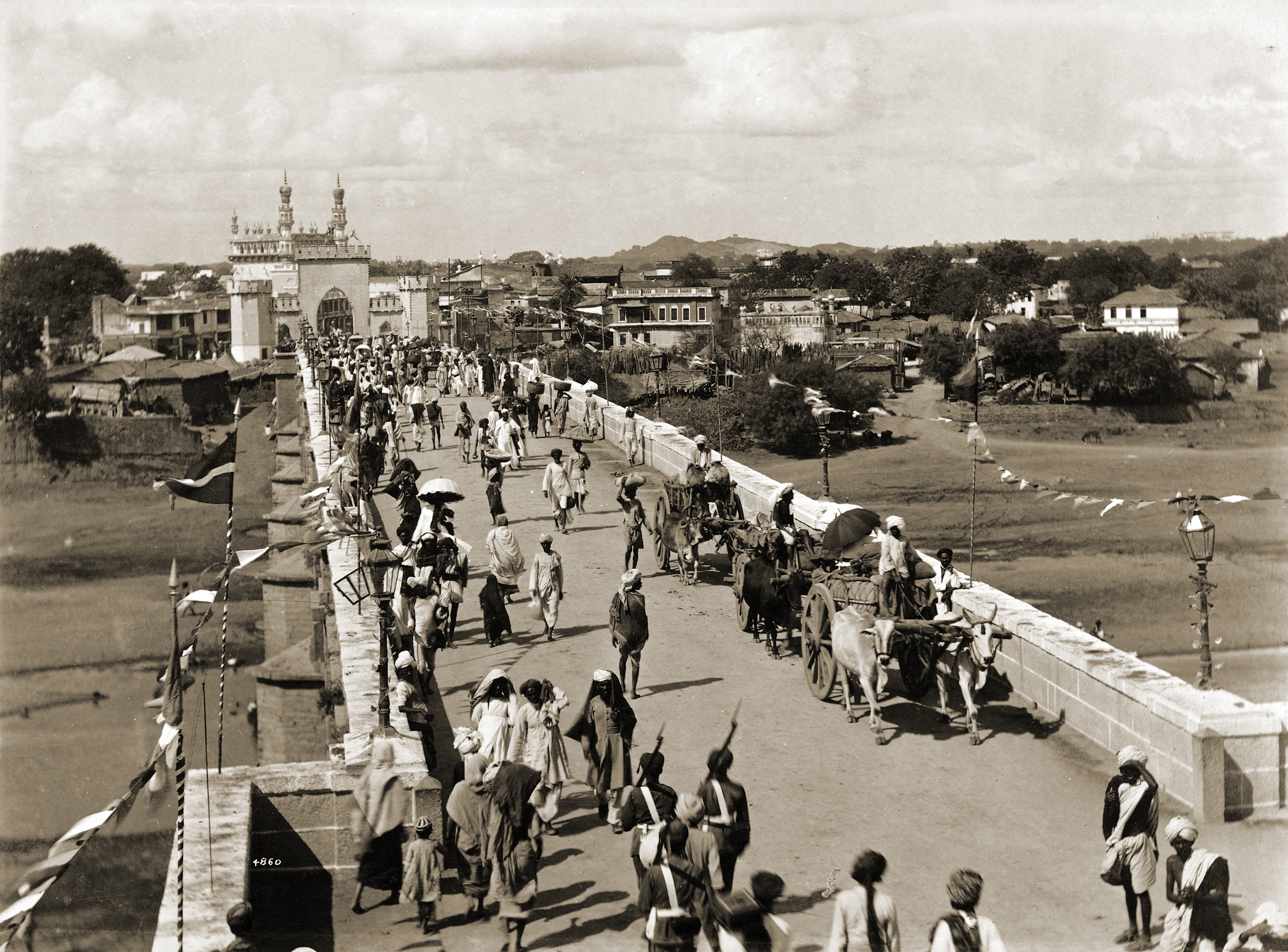
Purana Pul, the entrance bridge to Hyderabad

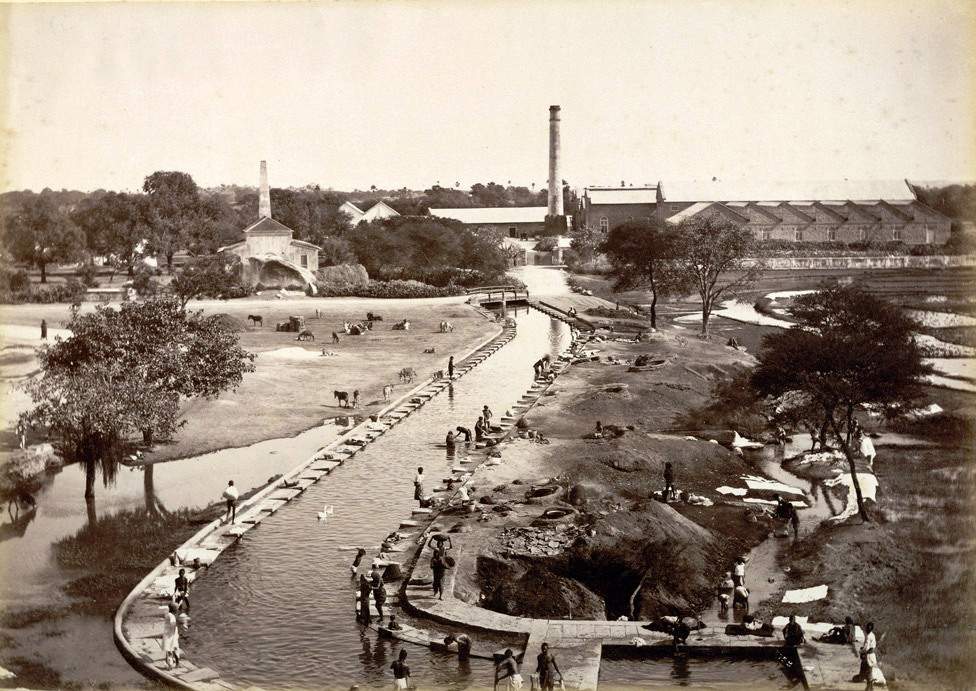
A mill with a canal connecting to Hussain Sagar lake.

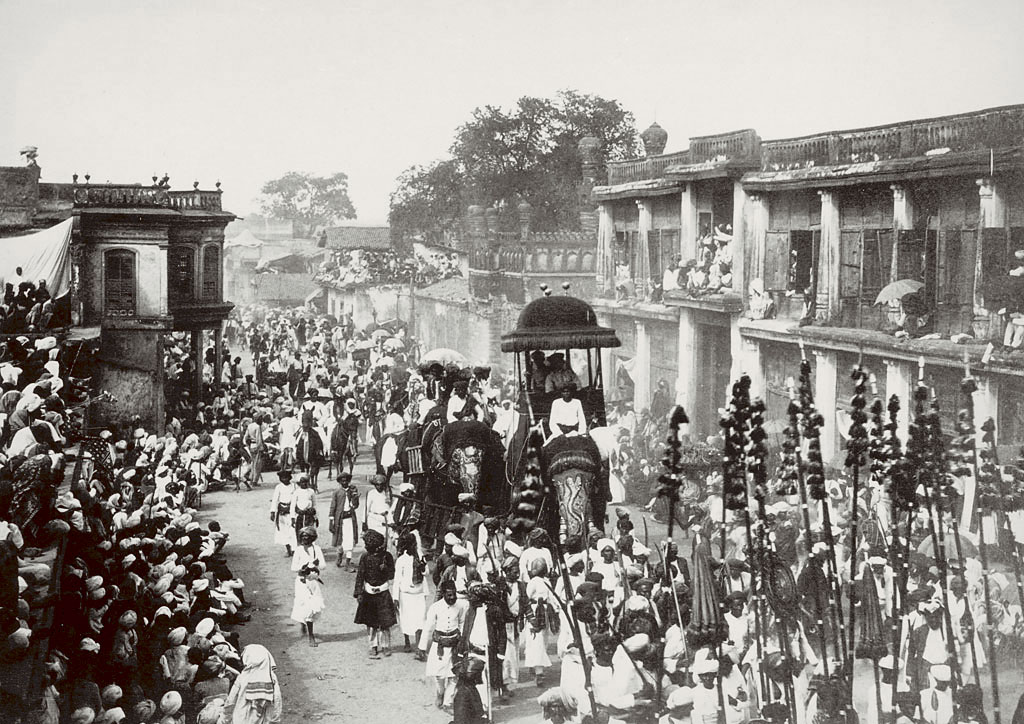
Muharram procession, which is being held every year since the Qutb Shahi era

Photographs of Hyderabad taken by Lala Deen Dayal in the 1880s.

=== Asaf Jah VI ===
Asaf Jah VI Mir Mahbub Ali Khan was the sixth Nizam of Hyderabad. He ruled the state from 1866 till his death in 1911. He inherited the throne at the age of three, and the state was ruled by his regents Salar Jung I and Shams-ul-Umra III. The Nizam assumed full rule at the age of eighteen.

The Nizam's Guaranteed State Railway was established in 1879, a railway company fully owned by the Nizam. It was formed to connect Hyderabad with the rest of the British India, and was headquartered at Secunderabad Railway Station. After independence, it was integrated into the Indian Railways. The introduction of railways also marked the beginning of industry in Hyderabad, and four factories were built to the south and east of the Hussain Sagar lake.

The population of Hyderabad city reached 448,000 in 1901, making it the fourth most populous in British India. The surrounding Hyderabad State had a population of 11 million.

The Great Musi Flood of 1908 ravaged the city during his reign, killing an estimated 15,000 people and affecting at least 200,000. All the bridges over the River Musi were destroyed, except for the Purana Pul. The Nizam threw open his palace Purani Haveli for the flood victims.

To my horror, I found that three leaks had started and were rapidly extending. The breach of this dam would precipitate an enormous volume of water into the still greater Hosain Sagar Lake, probably cause the dam to burst and thus complete the destruction of Hyderabad city,

— Michael O'Dwyer, British Resident

The flood necessitated planned development of the city. The Nizam invited Sir M. Visvesvaraya to design the flood prevention system of modern Hyderabad.

The Nizam died in 1911 at the age of 45.

=== Asaf Jah VII ===
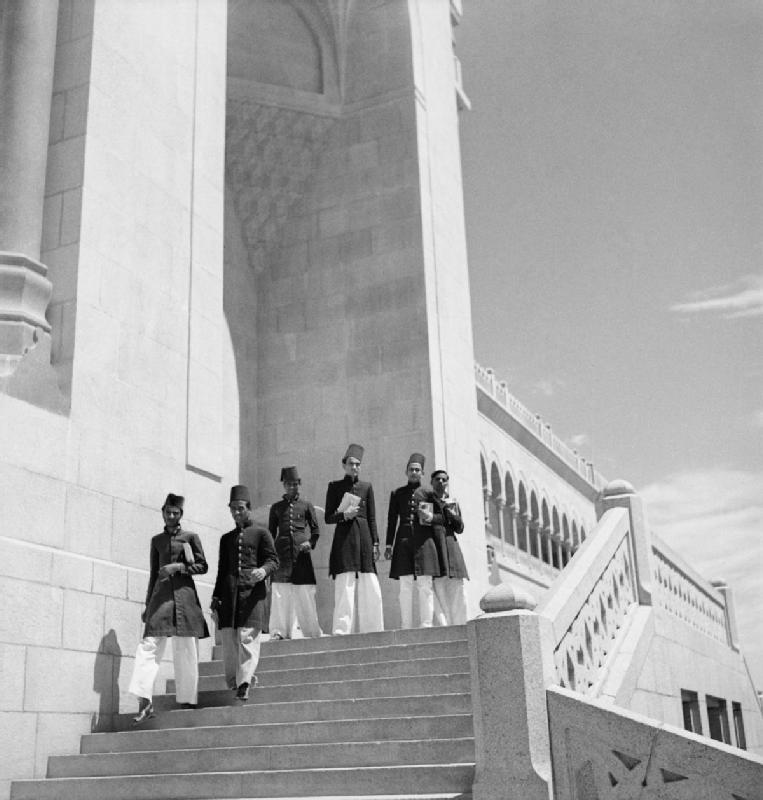
Students leaving the Osmania University, c. 1939–1945

The seventh and last Nizam of Hyderabad, Mir Osman Ali Khan ascended the throne in 1911.

He founded numerous institutions and public buildings in the city, including the Begumpet Airport, Hyderabad State Bank, Osmania University, Nizamia Observatory, Moazzam Jahi Market, Nizamia Hospital, Assembly Hall (formerly known as the Town Hall) State Central Library (formerly known as the Asafiya Library), Hyderabad High Court. and the Osmania General Hospital. The Nizam also invited British architect Vincent Esch for designing some of these. The Nizam also owned an airline, called the Deccan Airways.

Two large reservoirs, namely the Osman Sagar and the Himayat Sagar were constructed a few kilometers west of Hyderabad to prevent another flood in the city, on the advice of Sir M. Visvesvaraya.

He was known for his immense wealth, and large jewel collection, composed of 173 jewels, including the Jacob Diamond. He was proclaimed the richest man in the world in 1937, and appeared on the cover of Time magazine owing majorly to the Golconda mines, which were the primary source of his wealth.

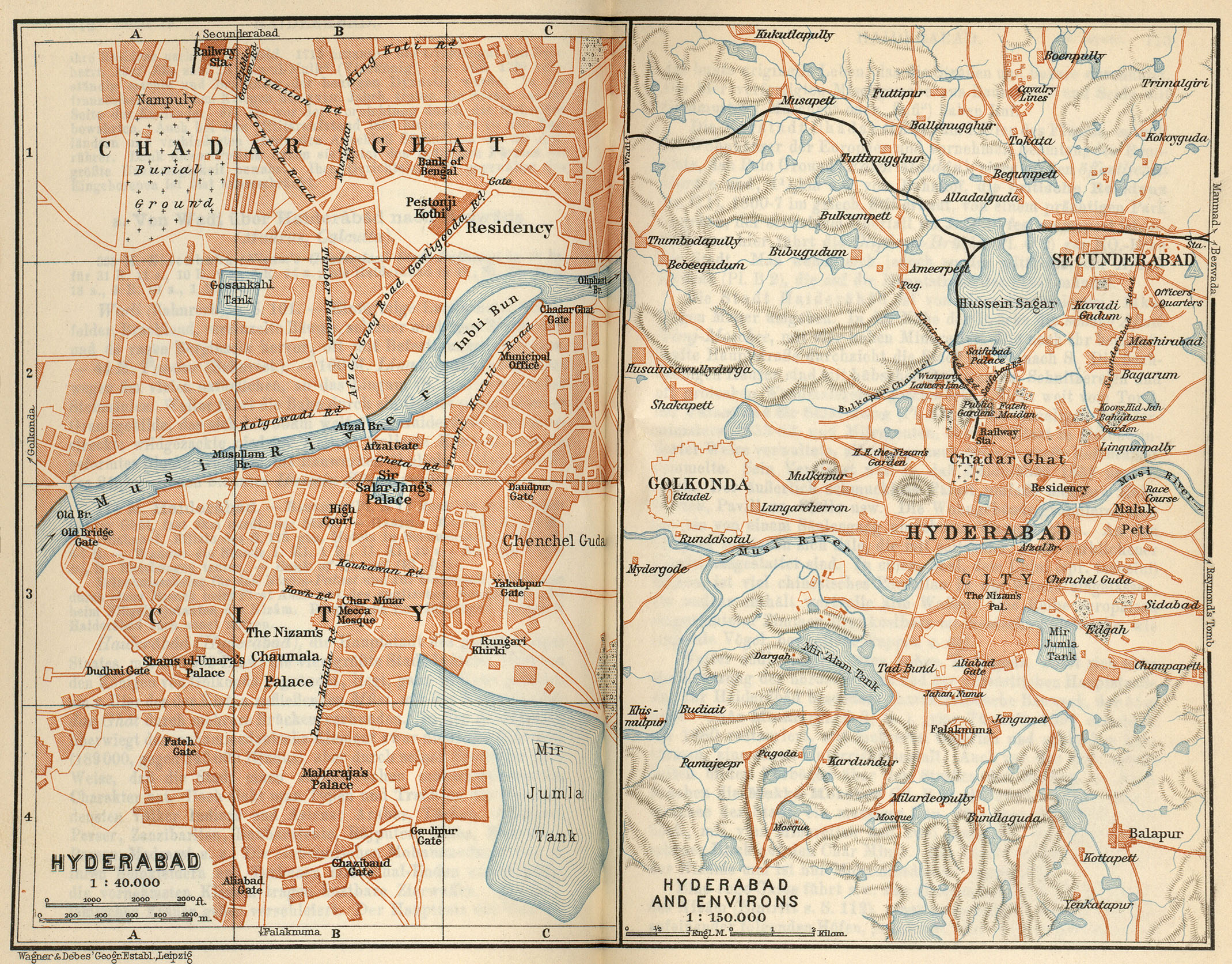
Map of Hyderabad, 1914

Various industries emerged in pre-independence Hyderabad during the rule of Asaf Jah VII. The major industries that were established in various parts of Hyderabad, and surrounding areas are:

Industries formed during the rule of Asaf Jah VII
Company	Year
Karkhana Zinda Tilismat	1920
Singareni Collieries	1921
Vazir Sultan Tobacco Company, Charminar cigarette factory	1930
Azam Jahi Mills Warangal	1934
Nizam Sugar Factory	1937
Allwyn Metal Works	1942
Praga Tools	1943
Deccan Airways Limited	1945
Hyderabad Asbestos	1946
Sirsilk	1946

== Post-Independence (1948–present) ==
=== Integration into the Indian Union ===
When India gained independence in 1947, the Nizam declared his intention to remain independent, either as a sovereign ruler or by acquiring Dominion status within the British Commonwealth. In order to keep essential trade and supplies flowing, he signed a Standstill agreement with the Indian Union, which surrounded him on all sides. The law and order situation soon deteriorated, with escalating violence between the private Razakar army fighting for continuation of the Nizam's rule and the people with the support of the Congress leaders like Swami Ramanand Tirtha and the communists of Telangana, were fighting for joining the Union. As the violence spiraled out of control with refugees flowing into the coastal Andhra region of the Madras state of India, the Indian Government under Home Minister Sardar Patel initiated a police action titled Operation Polo.

On 16 September 1948, the Indian Army moved into Hyderabad State from five fronts. Four days later, the Hyderabad forces surrendered. The number of dead was a little over 800. The Police Action achieved success within a matter of days. The Nizam finally surrendered and signed the Instrument of Accession to the Indian Union and Hyderabad was integrated into the Union as a state.

=== Hyderabad State ===
The state got its first democratic government and the representatives of its 18 million people were admitted to the Constituent Assembly drafting a constitution for free India. For the next eight years, Hyderabad State continued as a separate state within the Union, with its capital Hyderabad.

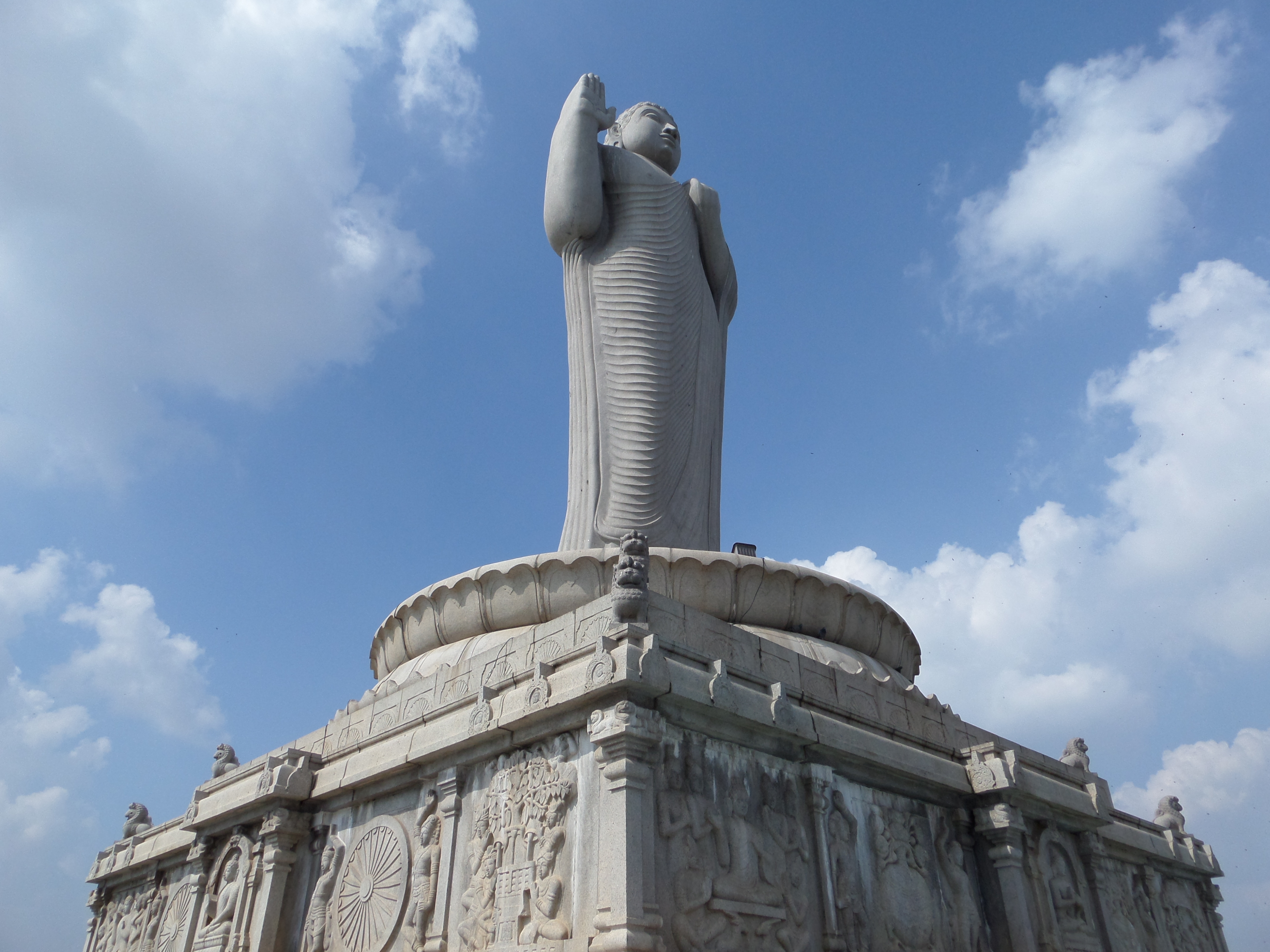
The Buddha Statue of Hyderabad at Hussain Sagar lake was constructed in the 1980s.

=== Demand for Second capital of India ===
In 1955, in a report Thoughts on Linguistic States, B. R. Ambedkar the then chairman of the Drafting Committee of the Indian Constitution, expressed in his report that the city should be designated as the second capital of India after Delhi. As Hyderabad constitute a strategic central location, infrastructure and amenities. He expressed: "Hyderabad has all the amenities which Delhi has and it is a far better city than Delhi. It has all the grandeur which Delhi has. Buildings are going cheap and they are really beautiful buildings, far superior to those in Delhi. The only thing that is wanting is a Parliament House which the Government of India can easily build." In 2014, the demand resurfaced during the bifurcation of Andhra Pradesh, and in 2019, during the reorganisation of Jammu and Kashmir.

=== 1956–present ===
On 1 November 1956, the states of India were reorganized on linguistic grounds and the 7th Nizam Mir Osman Ali Khan was made the Rajpramukh based on his administrative abilities. Consequently, the territories of the State of Hyderabad were divided between newly created Andhra Pradesh, Bombay state (later Maharashtra), and Karnataka. Hyderabad and the surrounding areas were merged into Andhra Pradesh based on Telugu linguistic majority, and Hyderabad became the capital of the new state of Andhra Pradesh. Since 1956, Rashtrapati Nilayam, Hyderabad has been the second official residence and business office of the President of India.

HITEC City was launched in the 1990s as by the Andhra Pradesh government. Today, many multinational IT Companies including Amazon, Infosys, Cognizant, Microsoft, Tech Mahindra and HCL have offices in HITEC City, and the surrounding localities of Gachibowli and Madhapur. In 2005, construction began for the Rajiv Gandhi International Airport, which was completed and opened in 2008, to replace the old Begumpet Airport. It is one of the busiest airports in India.

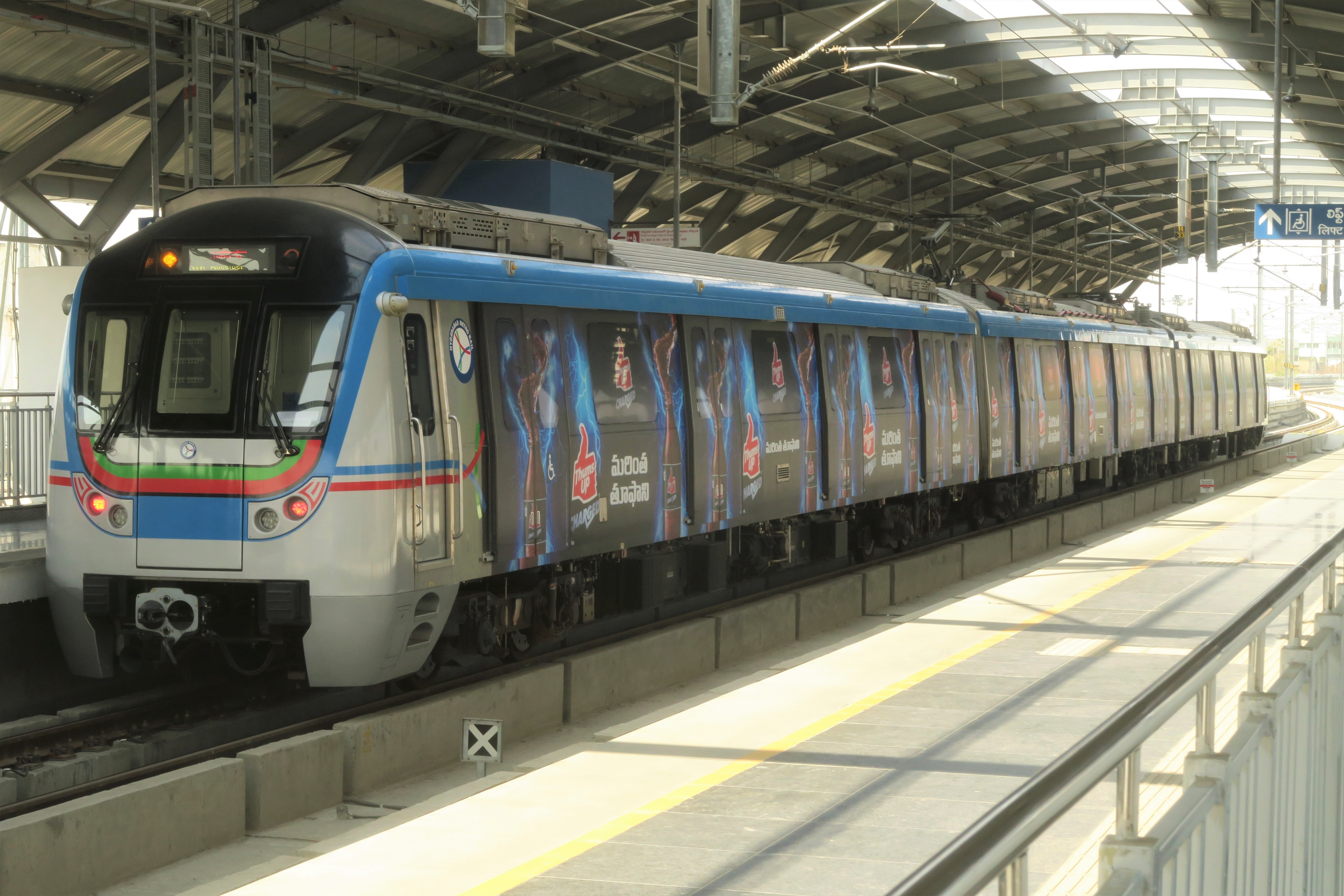
Hyderabad Metro was inaugurated in 2017.

The city saw terrorist bomb blasts in May 2007, August 2007 and February 2013.

Hyderabad also hosted the 2007 Military World Games and 2009 World Badminton Championships.

By the Andhra Pradesh Reorganization Act, 2014, Telangana was separated from Andhra Pradesh as a new 29th state of India, with the city of Hyderabad as its capital. The new state was created on 2 June 2014. K. Chandrashekhar Rao was elected as the first Chief Minister of Telangana. Hyderabad would also remain the de jure capital of Andhra Pradesh for a period of ten years.

The Hyderabad Metro Rail began operations in 2017, five years after its groundbreaking in 2012. Many new routes are being planned as part of the metro expansion.

Hyderabad witnessed a construction boom in the late 2010s, fuelled by growth in its IT corridor. By 2025, the city had 20 skyscrapers and had the second-highest number of skyscrapers in the country.

== Gallery ==
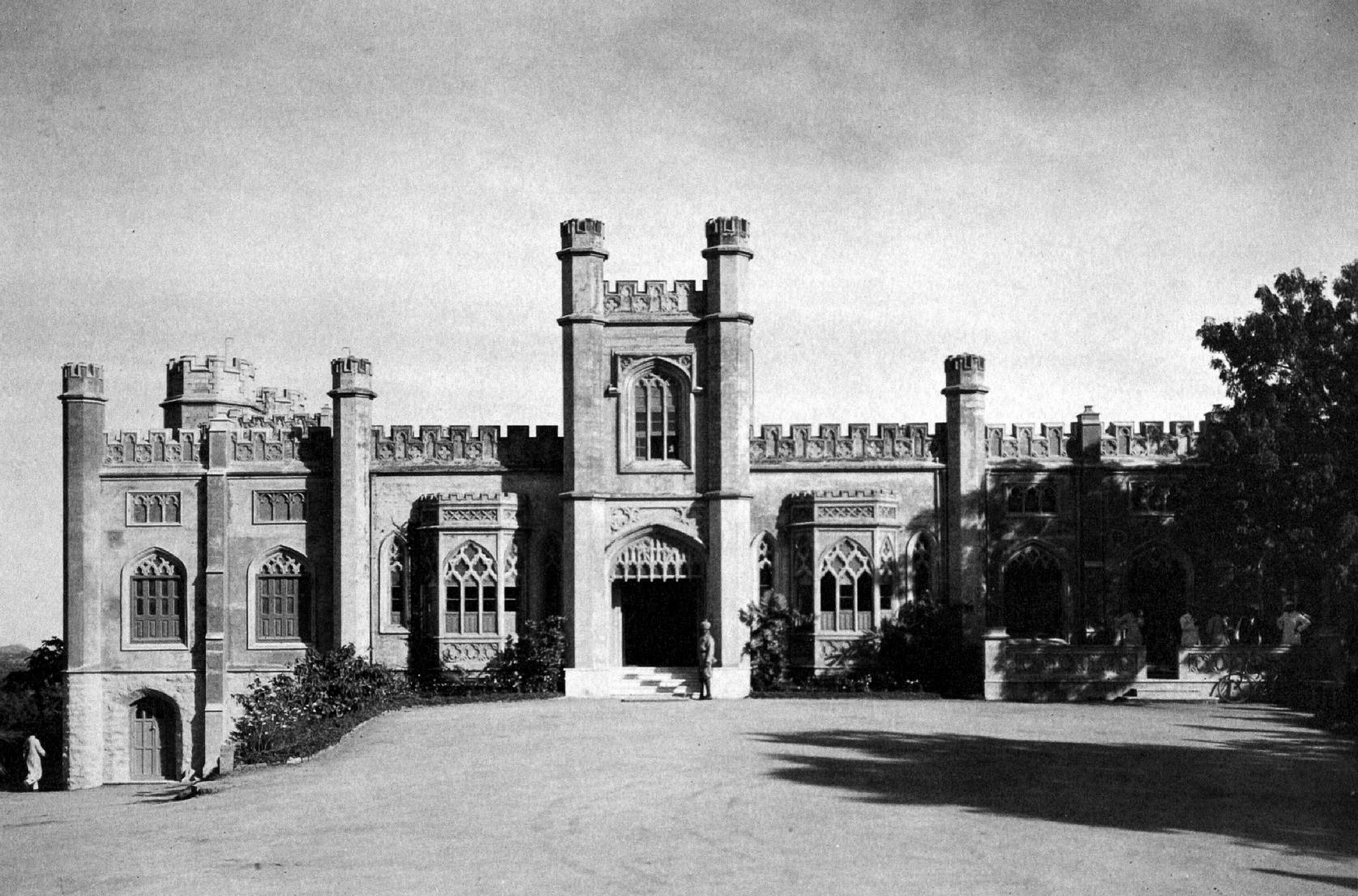
The Hill Fort Palace, 1930s

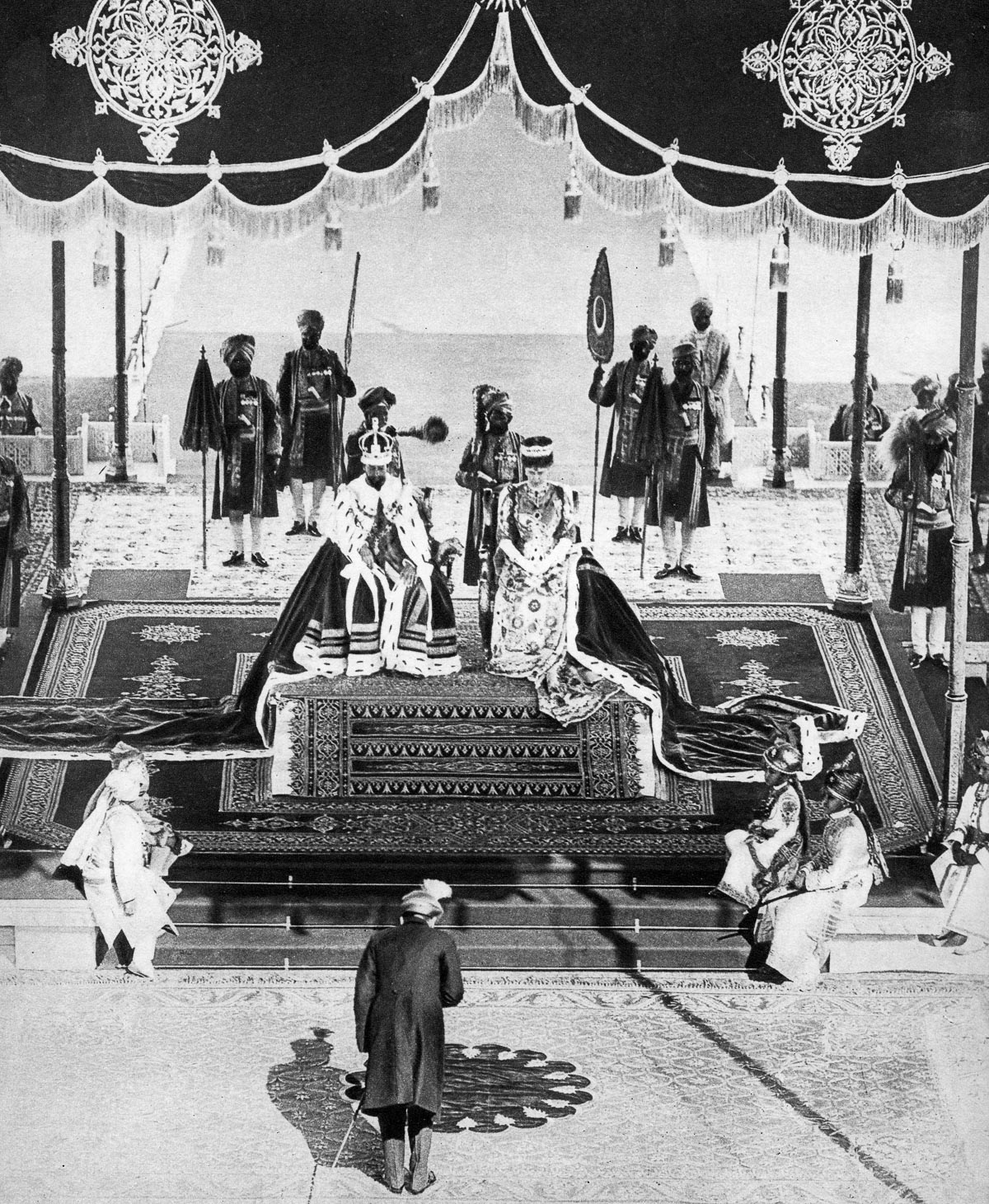
Asaf Jah VII pays homage to King George and Queen Mary, Delhi Durbar, 1911

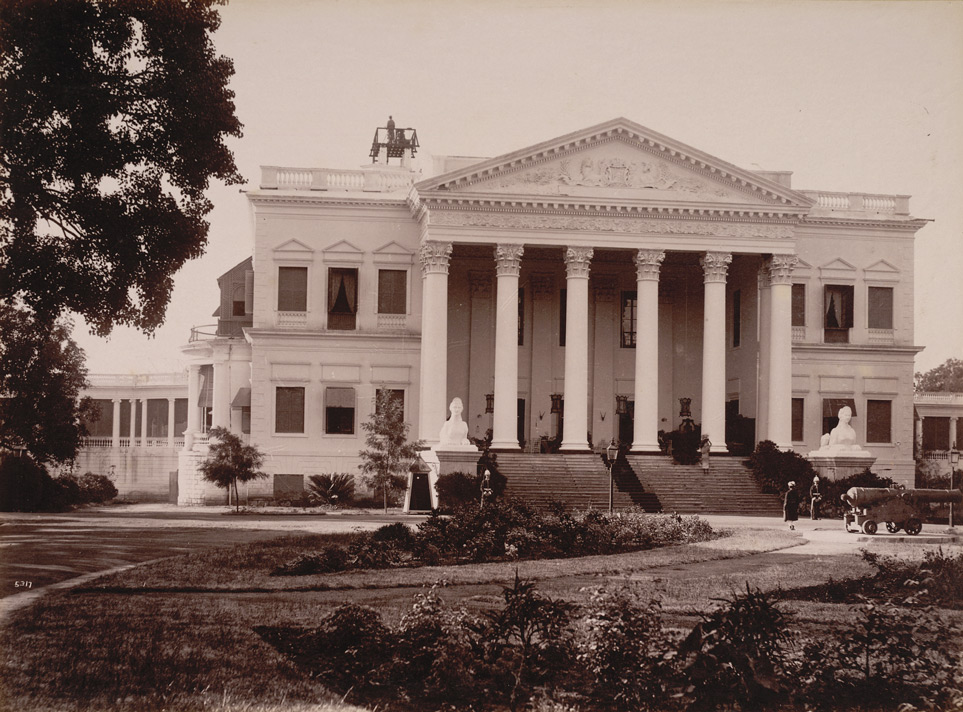
British Residency, Hyderabad, 1880s

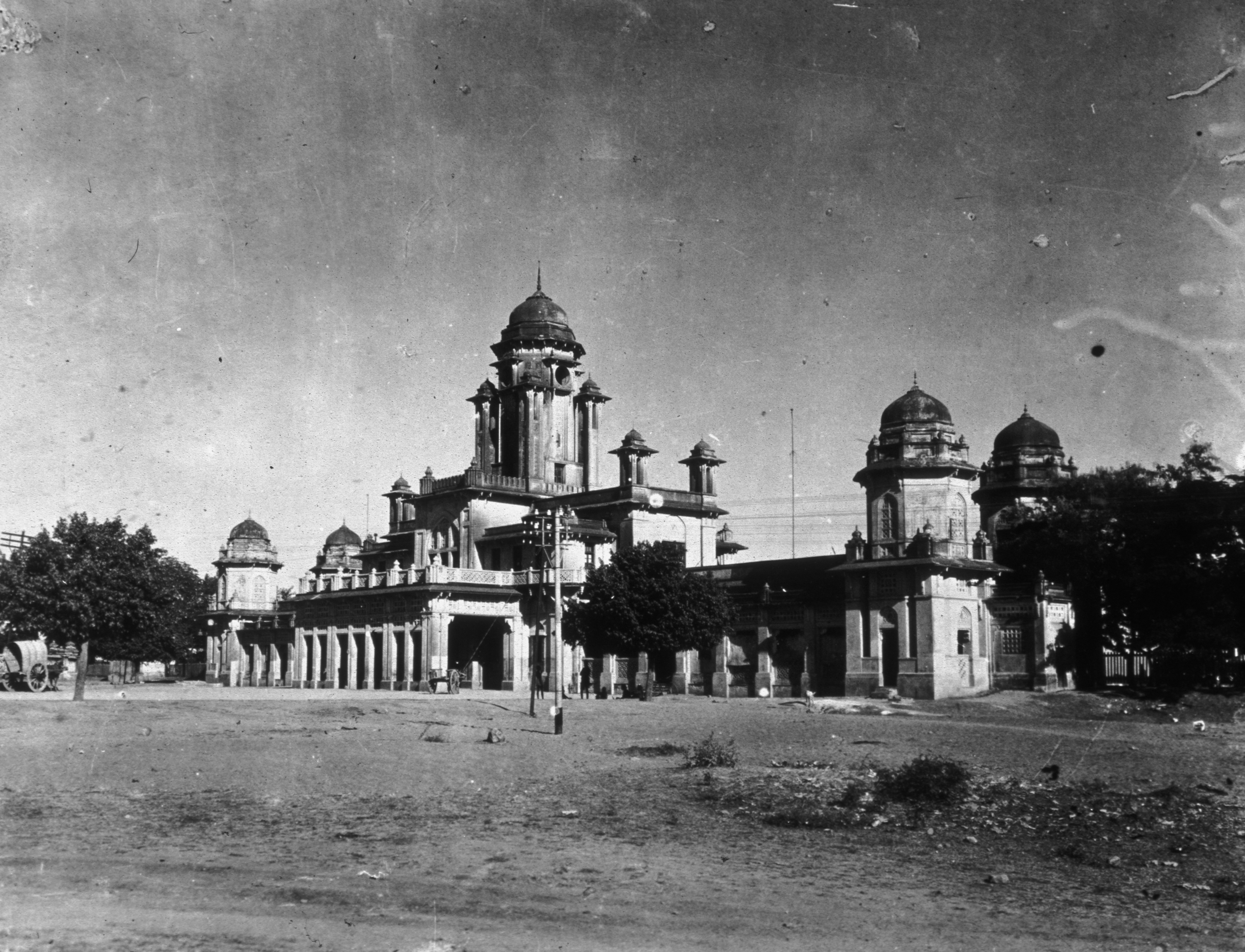
Kachiguda Railway Station, 1932

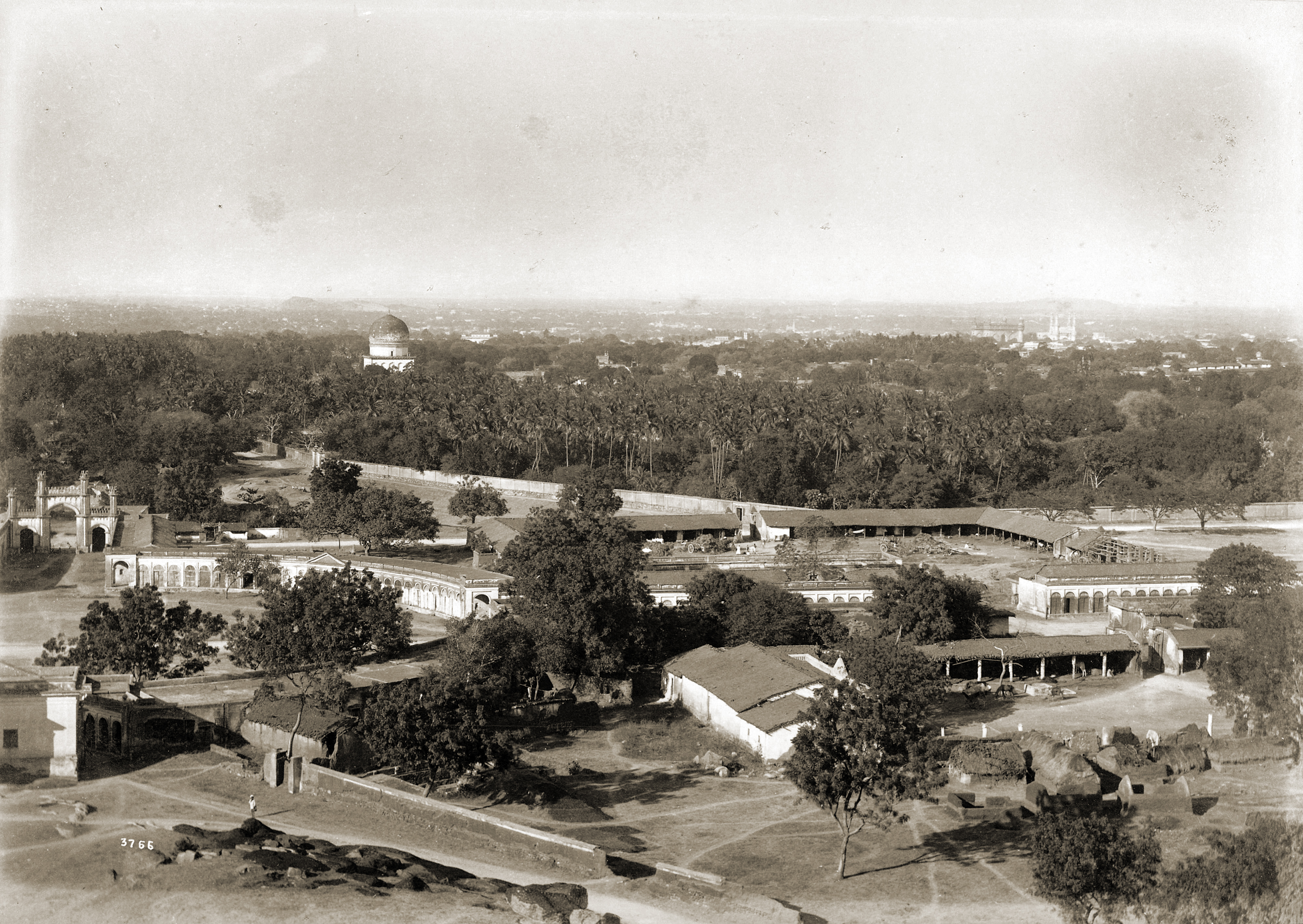
Distant view of Hyderabad, 1880s

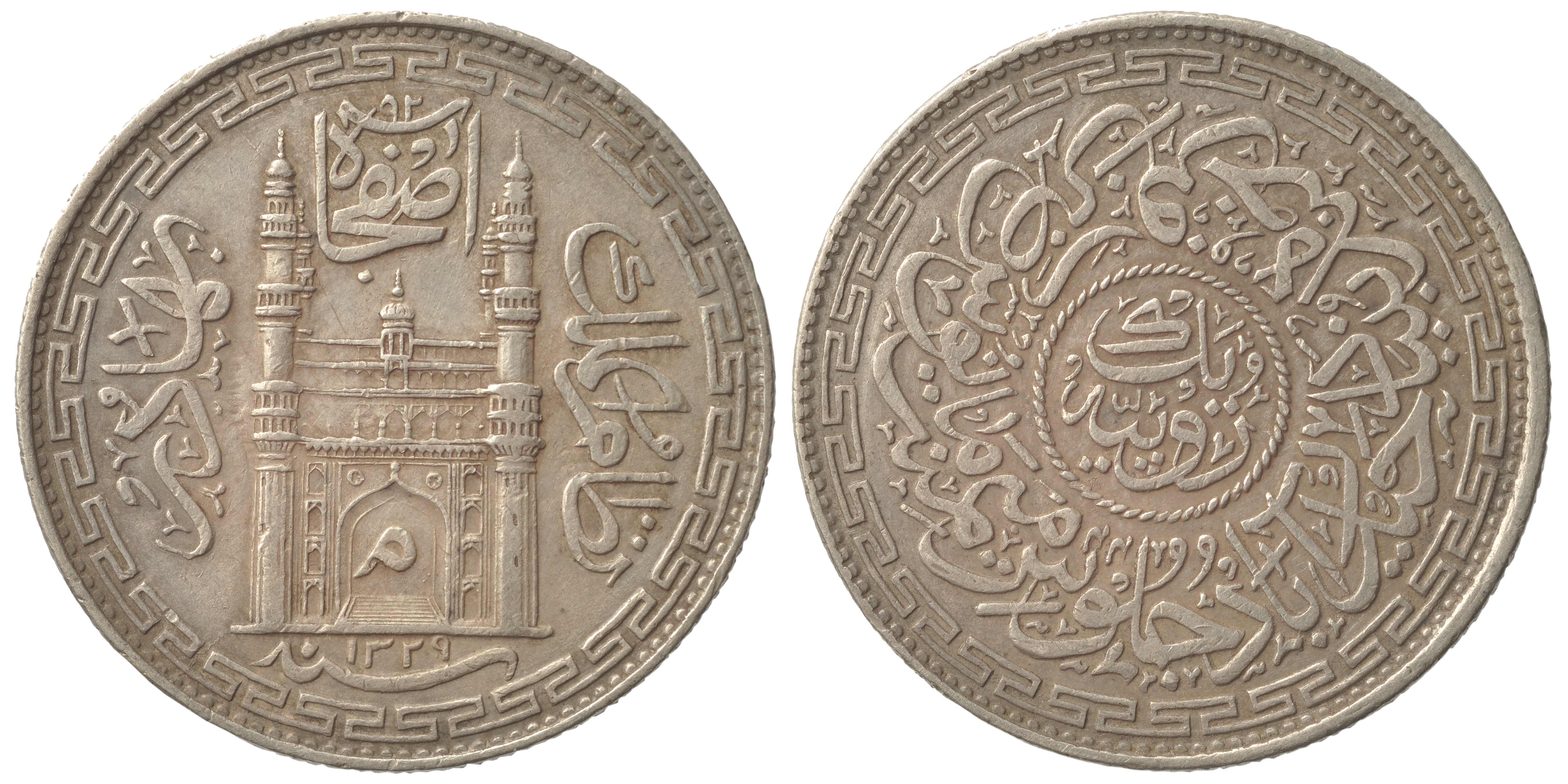
One Hyderabadi Rupee coin issued in 1329 AH (1911 CE) during the reign of Asaf Jah VI

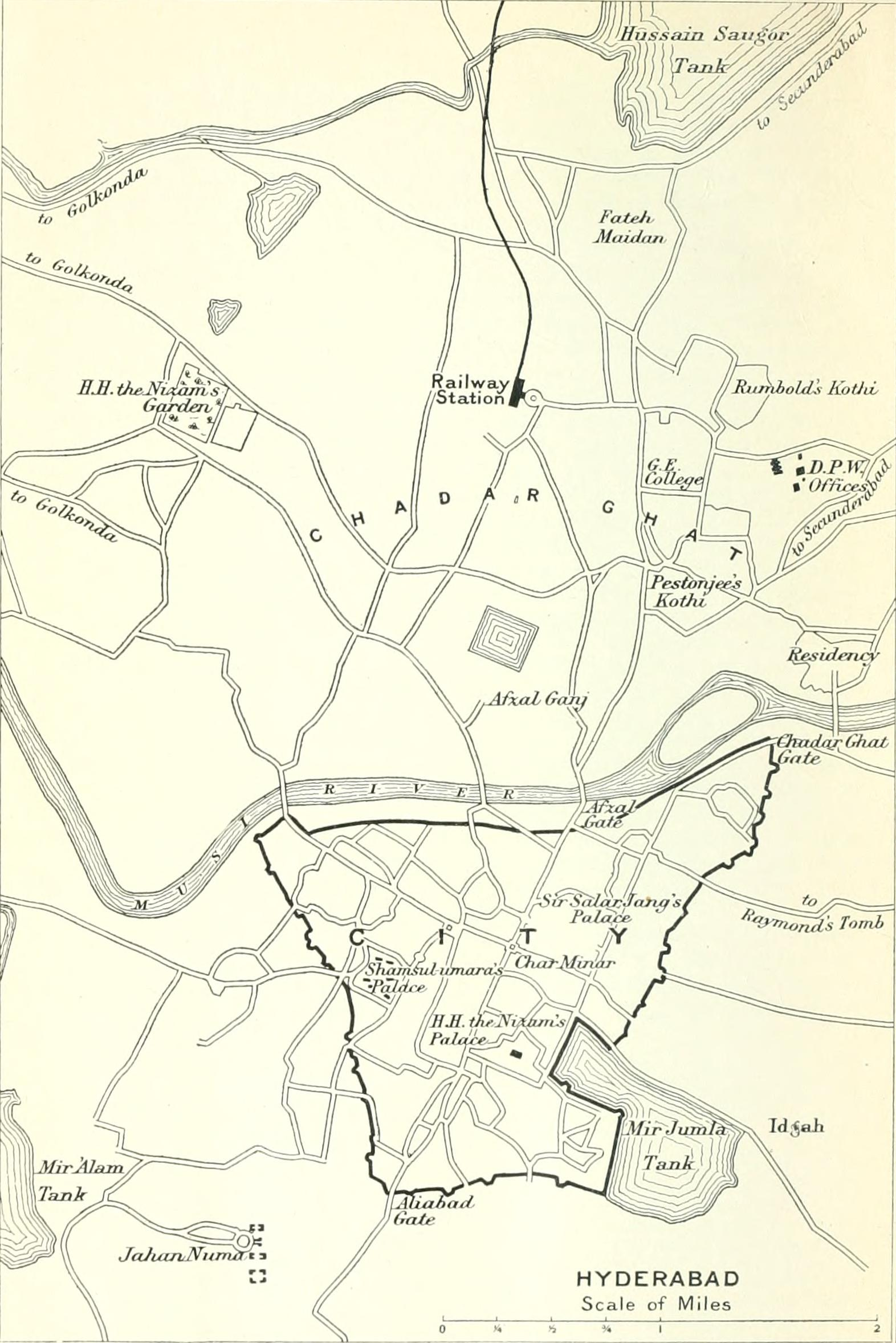
Map of Hyderabad, 1911

== See also ==
- Etymology of localities of Hyderabad
- 1990 Hyderabad riots
