= Etymology of localities of Hyderabad =

Origins of place names in Hyderabad, India

The localities and neighbourhoods of Hyderabad have unique oral histories, dating to the time of the Qutb Shahi dynasty, over 400 years ago, and are named after various people and things. Some are named after a major building or structure in the locality, (Falaknuma, Koti, Lal Darwaza) others named for individuals. The names are mostly in Telugu and Urdu, the widely spoken languages of the city. List of localities, neighbourhoods and streets of Hyderabad and their etymology include:

- A. C. Guards - stands for African Cavalry Guards; named after the African personal bodyguards of the Nizam; It is the area where they used to reside.
- A. S. Rao Nagar - named after Ayyagari Sambasiva Rao, the founder of the nearby ECIL.
- Abids - named after Jewish merchant, Albert Abid.
- Afzal Gunj - named after the fifth Nizam, Afzal ad-Dawlah. Gunj means mart or market.
- Aghapura - named after Hazrat Dawood.
- Ameerpet - this area was gifted by the 6th Nizam of Hyderabad, Mahboob Ali Khan, to Amir Ali. He constructed a palace in the area, which is now the Nature Cure Hospital. This area houses many shopping malls and coaching centers and the Nizamia observatory.
- Amberpet - named after Amber Baba, a Sufi saint.
- Asif Nagar - named after the Asaf Jahi dynasty of Hyderabad.
- Asman Garh Palace - literally "fort of the sky" in Urdu. It is located at Malakpet.
- Banjara Hills - named by Mehdi Nawaz Jung after the Banjara community, its original residents.
- Barkas - a corrupted form of Barracks; the area housed the military barracks of the Nizam
- Bashirbagh - literally "Bashir's garden" in Urdu; named after Nawab Bashir-ud-Doula, where his palace used to stand.
- Begum Bazar - named after Humda Begum, wife of the second Nizam; It is believed she gave the land to the merchants of the city.
- Begumpet - named after Bahshir-ul-Nisa Begum, daughter of Sikandar Jah.
- Chaderghat - "Chader" literally means "White Sheet" in Urdu. It was first called as Oliphant Nagar, named after the British East India Company chairman James Oliphant.
- Chatta Bazaar - A place at Purani Haveli. It is a corrupted form of Chath bazaar. Chath is a Hindi/Urdu word means shade, which is used to provide shade to the bazaar merchants.
- Charminar - literally "four minarets" in Urdu.
- Dabirpura - literally "Colony of Scholars". Named in the honour of Dabir-ul-Mulk.
- Dar-ul-Shifa - literally "House of Healing" in Urdu; named after a historic hospital in the area.
- Dhoolpet - literally "Colony of Dust". Hindu migrants who came all the way from Uttar Pradesh during the Mughal rule settled here.
- Dilsukhnagar - derived its name from Dilsukh Ram Pershad, an agricultural land owner belonging to Malakpet, who also owns this area. He later divided this area into plots and gave it to the public, so the neighborhood was named in his honour.
- Domalguda - named after the Hindi word "Domal", meaning two wrestlers. It was the place where two wrestlers used to reside. Here the Ramakrishna Mission and Andhra Vidyalaya College are located and occupy nearly half of the area.
- Falaknuma - literally "Mirror of the Sky" in Urdu; named after the Falaknuma Palace.
- Fateh Nagar - named after Nawab Abul Fateh Khan, the eldest son of Amir-e-Paigah Nawab Sultan-ul-Mulk Bahadur and grandson of the Vth Amir of Paigah, Nawab Sir Viqar-ul-Umra Bahadur, who was the younger son of Nawab Rasheeduddin Khan Bahadur, Shams ul Umra, Amir e Kabir IÌI, Amir e Paigah IV and Co-Regent of Hyderabad. After Nawab Sir Viqar-ul-Umra Bahadur, the Indian town Vikarabad was also named.
- Film Nagar - named after the Tollywood film stars residing there. It is also known as Tinsel Town or Tollywood.
- Gachibowli - got its name from the words "Gachi" meaning limestone plaster and "bowli" meaning a stepwell in Telugu.
- Golconda - named after the words "Gol" meaning round in Urdu and "conda" meaning a hill in Telugu.
- Golnaqa - literally meaning "round checkpost" in Urdu.
- Goshamahal - derived from the word "Gosha" meaning secluded women in purdah and "Mahal" meaning palace.
- Habsiguda - named after an African tribe named "Habeeshins", who helped in the construction of the Osmania University. The place was called first as "Habeeshingudem" which became Habsiguda.
- Hayathnagar - named after Hayath Bakshi Begum, daughter of Muhammad Quli Qutb Shah; this is the area where she built a mosque.
- Himayatnagar - named after the son of the last Nizam, Prince Azam Jah, or Mir Himayat Ali Khan.
- HITEC City - an abbreviated form of Hyderabad Information Technology and Engineering Consultancy City.
- Hussain Sagar - got its name from its architect, Hussain Shah Wali.
- Hyderabad - literally "city of tigers" in Persian and Urdu.
- Hyderguda - named after Hyder Ali, a collector who acquired the property from Waheedunnissa Begum, sister of Sikandar Jah, the third Nizam of Hyderabad.
- Irrum Manzil - literally "Paradise Mansion" in Persian and Urdu.
- Jamia Osmania - meaning "Osmania University" in Urdu. As the university is located at the neighborhood of Tarnaka, in Secunderabad, nearby to this place, this area got its name so.
- Karwan - a corrupted form of the English word "Caravan", it was named so as there were caravans going to Golconda.
- Khairtabad - named after Khairunnisa Begum, daughter of Sultan Muhammad Qutb Shah; this is the area where he constructed the Khairatabad Mosque.
- Korenti Fever Hospital - a place where Sir Ronald Ross Institute of Tropical and Communicable Diseases, also known as is situated. Its a crude form of "Quarantine" eventually became Korenti.
- Koti - literally "mansion" in Urdu; named after the Koti Residency, which used to be located here.
- Lakdi ka pul - meaning "wooden stick bridge", named after a stick bridge which used to connect Secunderabad to Nampally.
- Lal Darwaza - literally "Red Door" in Urdu; named after a Red Gateway that used to exist in the area.
- Lallaguda - Lalla, the architect of the palace of Bibi Saheba, the queen of Nizam Ali Khan, Asaf Jah II
- L. B. Nagar - named after the second prime minister of India, Shri Lal Bahadur Shastri Ji.
- Madina building, Hyderabad - named due to the hospitality given to the hajj pilgrims.
- Mahatma Gandhi Road - named after Mahatma Gandhi after independence; previously used to be called James Street, named after Major James Achilles Kirkpatrick.
- Malakpet - named after Malik Yaqoub, a servant of Abdullah Qutb Shah, where he used to reside.
- Malkajgiri - said to be the corruption of Mallikarjuna Giri, named after Lord Mallikarjuna.
- Masab Tank - a corruption of Ma Saheba Tank, after a tank which itself was named after Hayath Bakshi Begum (called Ma Saheba affectionately), a Qutb Shahi princess.
- Mehdipatnam - named after Mehdi Nawaz Jung, a politician, bureaucrat and eminent personality of Hyderabad.
- Miyapur - named after Miya Patel, the Patel of the region.
- Moazzam Jahi Market - named after the son of the last Nizam, Prince Moazzam Jah.
- Moosrambagh - also Moosa Ram Bagh is an old suburb of Hyderabad, Telangana, India. It is named after the French military commander Monsieur Raymond who served the Nizams during the 18th century. His tomb Raymond's Tomb is located near Asman Garh Palace. The locality of "Moosa-Ram-Bagh" is named after him. Wherein, Bagh refers to "a Garden" as the area was once covered by huge greenery.
- Moula Ali - named after the Moula Ali Dargah (a dargah, or shrine dedicated to Ali), which is located here.
- Musheerabad - named after Nawab Arastu Jah Mushir-ul-Mulk, who served as Prime Minister of Hyderabad.
- Nampally - named after Nekh Nam Khan, a Diwan of Hyderabad during the Qutb Shahi era.
- Nayapul - literally "New Bridge" in Urdu; named for a bridge built over the River Musi located here.
- Paradise Circle - named after the erstwhile Paradise Cinemas and Paradise Cafe, which converted into Paradise Hotel.
- Puranapul - literally "Old Bridge" in Urdu; named for the 400-year-old bridge over River Musi located here.
- P.V. Narasimha Rao Expressway, named after P. V. Narasimha Rao, a former Prime Minister of India
- Sanghi Nagar - named after the Sanghi Temple located there.
- Sanjeeva Reddy Nagar - named after Neelam Sanjiva Reddy, former President of India.
- Saroornagar - named after Suroor Afza Bai, wife of Arastu Jah, the then Prime Minister of Hyderabad.
- Secunderabad - named after the third Nizam, Sikandar Jah.
- Shaikpet - named after a person named Sheikh Muhammad Basha.
- Sitaphalmandi - got its name from the words "Sitaphal" meaning custard apple in Urdu and "Mandi" meaning market in Urdu.
- Somajiguda - named after Sonaji, an employee of the revenue department of Roy Ryan Sham Raj.
- Tadbun palm valley - Tadban (Palm Valley) got its name from the erstwhile presence of palm trees in the area and across the banks of Mir Alam Lake.
- Tarnaka - literally meaning "wired checkpost" in Urdu.
- Tolichowqi - derived from the words "Toli" meaning troupe and "Chowqi" meaning "crossroads".
- Yaqutpura - literally meaning "Colony of Rubies".
