= Kharkhana Zinda Tilismath =

Medicinal products

Karkhana Zinda Tilismath
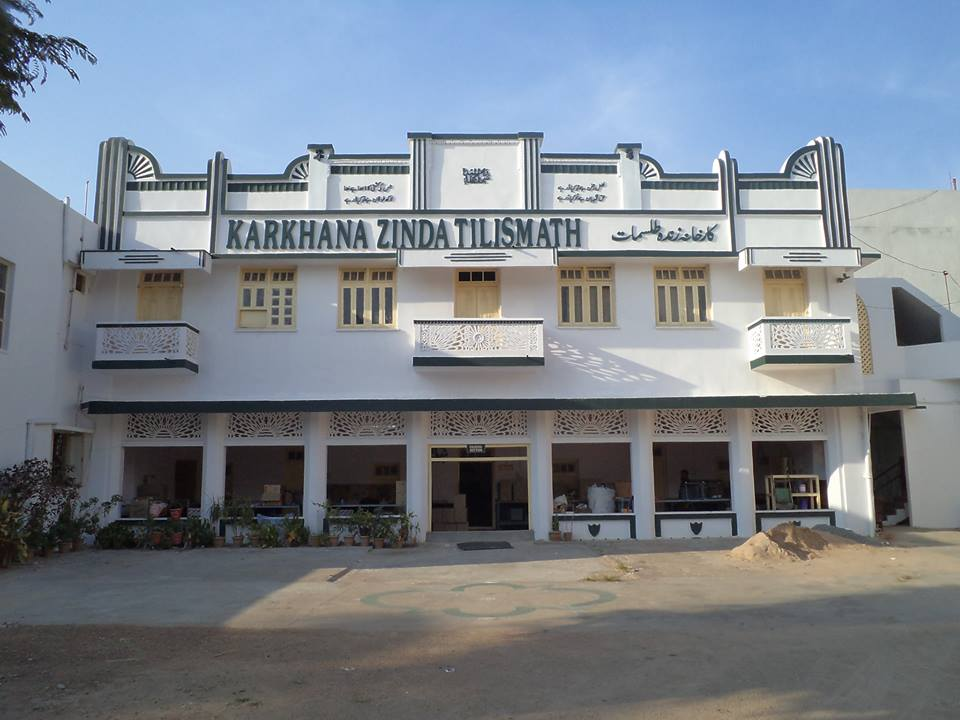
- Company type: Unani products
- Industry: Medicine
- Founded: 1920
- Founder: Hakeem Mohammed Moizuddin Farooqui
- Products: Over-the-counter medications
- Parent: Karkhana Zinda Tilismath

Karkhana Zinda Tilismath is medicinal products manufacturer of the well known Zinda Tilismath, Farooky Tooth Powder, Zinda Balm and Zint Lozenges.

== History ==
Late Hakeem Mohammed Moizuddin Farooqui founded the medical factory "Karkhana Zinda Tilismath" in the year 1920 and was one of those distinguished personalities who took the social life of Deccan to the age of industrial revolution. It has emerged today as makers of the best internationally known products of the Unani Medicine. It is one of the oldest firms of Hyderabad manufacturing Unani medicines -Zinda Tilismath, Farooky Tooth Powder and Zinda Balm, which were formulated by late Hakeem Mohd.Moizuddin Farooqui.

Right from its inception in 1920, Karkhana Zindatilismath has been charting an unwavering course that has catapulted the group into international limelight, and today, 99 years later, the company stands as a grand manufacturer of herbal unani medicines across India and also claims' international popularity for its products. The first Unani medicine called Zinda Tilismath was invented in Hyderabad State, in 1920 by a Hakeem Late Mohd Moizuddin Farooqui. The translation of the name of Zinda Tilismath in Urdu language means Living Magic.

== The Factory ==
All the products are manufactured in the factory by the family-owned private company called Karkhana Zinda Tilismath, which is located in Amberpet, Hyderabad.

== Products ==
Along with Zinda tilismath, the company also manufactures three other products that are the Farooky Tooth Powder and Zinda Balm and Zint Lozenges

- Zinda Tilismath: A Liquid lotion for headache, nausea etc.
- Farooky Tooth Powder: It is a herbal tooth powder, which consists of 16 herbal ingredients. This is used for dental hygiene, tooth decay and whitening of teeth.
- Zinda Balm: This is a pain balm manufactured by Karkhana Zindatilismath, which is used for external use for joint & muscle pains.
- Zint Lozenges: These are throat soothers made for cough remedy and throat relief.
