= Zinda Tilismath =

Herbal medicine

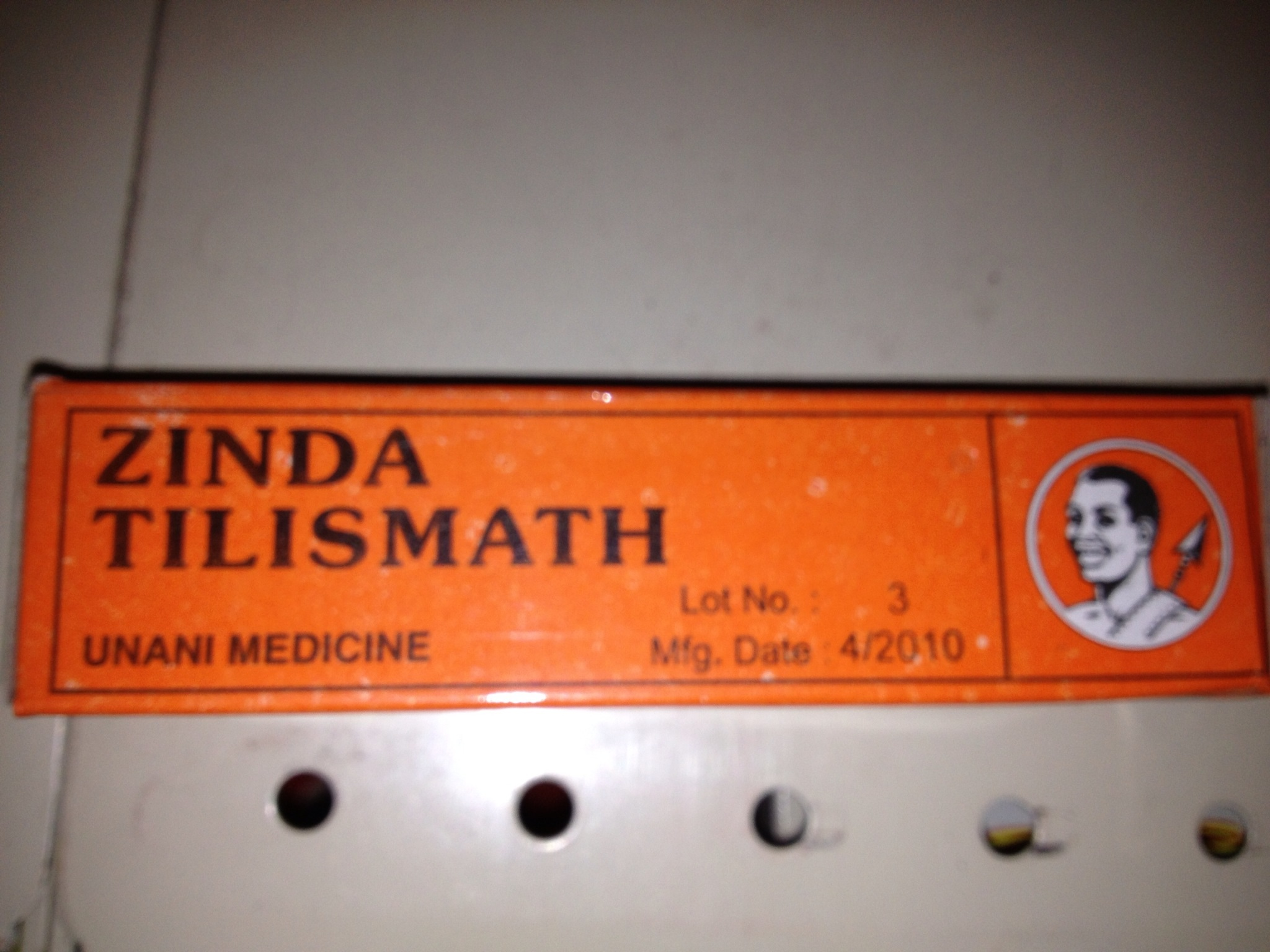
- Package of Zinda Tilismath
- Type: Unani herbal medicine
- Industry: Medicine
- Founded: 1920
- Founder: Hakeem Mohammed Moizuddin Farooqi
- Products: Over-the-counter medications
- Parent: Karkhana Zinda Tilismath, Amberpet, Hyderabad, Telangana
- Website: Official site

Zinda Tilismath is a Unani herbal medicine used for treating many common ailments like cold, coughs, throat pain, body pain, stomach disorders, ear pain, tooth pain and many more products. Based on the ancient herbal unani concept of medicine, Zinda Tilismath was founded by Hakeem Mohammed Moizuddin Farooqi in the year 1920. This was the period when new industries were beginning to emerge on the surface of Hyderabad and adding to Deccan's grandeur. Zinda Tilismath has a strong herbal/bitter taste, mainly consisting of eucalyptus and other various grassy notes. It is an over the counter drug, which is made from selected herbs. The medicine is said to have no side effects due to its herbal composition and is based on the Unani concept of medicine. It's available across India in many medical and general shops.

Zinda Tilismath was made during the Nizams rule in Hyderabad, for which it acquired the Nizams crown (Dastaar) as its trade mark. The Marketing logo was the face of an African Cavalry Guard ("Siddi") which was symbolic of good health and trust. This got associated with Zinda Tilismath during the Nizams regime for the sign of good health, strength and Trust. Henceforth it was used as the marketing logo by its founder for Zindatilismath.

== See also ==
- Karkhana Zinda Tilismath
