= Hussain Shah Wali =

Sufi saint in Golconda Sultanate (d. 1620)

Religious life
- Religion: Sunni Islam

Senior posting
- Based in: Hyderabad, Kingdom of Golkonda (now in Telangana, India)

Hussain Shah Wali was a sufi saint of Golkonda, during the reign of Qutb Shahi dynasty. He is credited with building the Hussain Sagar at Hyderabad in the year 1562. The mausoleum and shrine at the Qutb Shahi Tombs called Dargah Hussain Shah Wali was built by Abdullah Qutb Shah in his honour. He is a Hussaini sayyid and descendant of Khwaja Banda Nawaz. He died in 1620.

== Arrival at Golconda fort ==
Shah Wali arrived at Golconda, Hyderabad during the rule of Sultan Ibrahim Qutb Shah. The Sultan of Golconda was a follower of Shi'ism and shah wali was A Saiyed and the follower of Sufism . The sultan arranged for Shah Wali's stay, and in his first meeting gave Shah Wali the command over 10,000 troops and also named him secretary of royal construction works. After some time Sultan Ibrahim accepted him as his son in law.

== Death ==
Hussain Shah Wali died on 12 February 1620.

== Dargah of Hussain Shah Wali ==
The Darga of Saint Hussain Shah Wali is located at Shaikpet, about 2km north west of Golconda. The mausoleum and shrine near the Qutb Shahi Tombs called Dargah Hussain Shah Wali was built by Abdullah Qutb Shah in his honour.

It is commonly referred to as HS Darga or Shaikpet Darga by locals.
