= Khairatabad =

- Neighbourhood
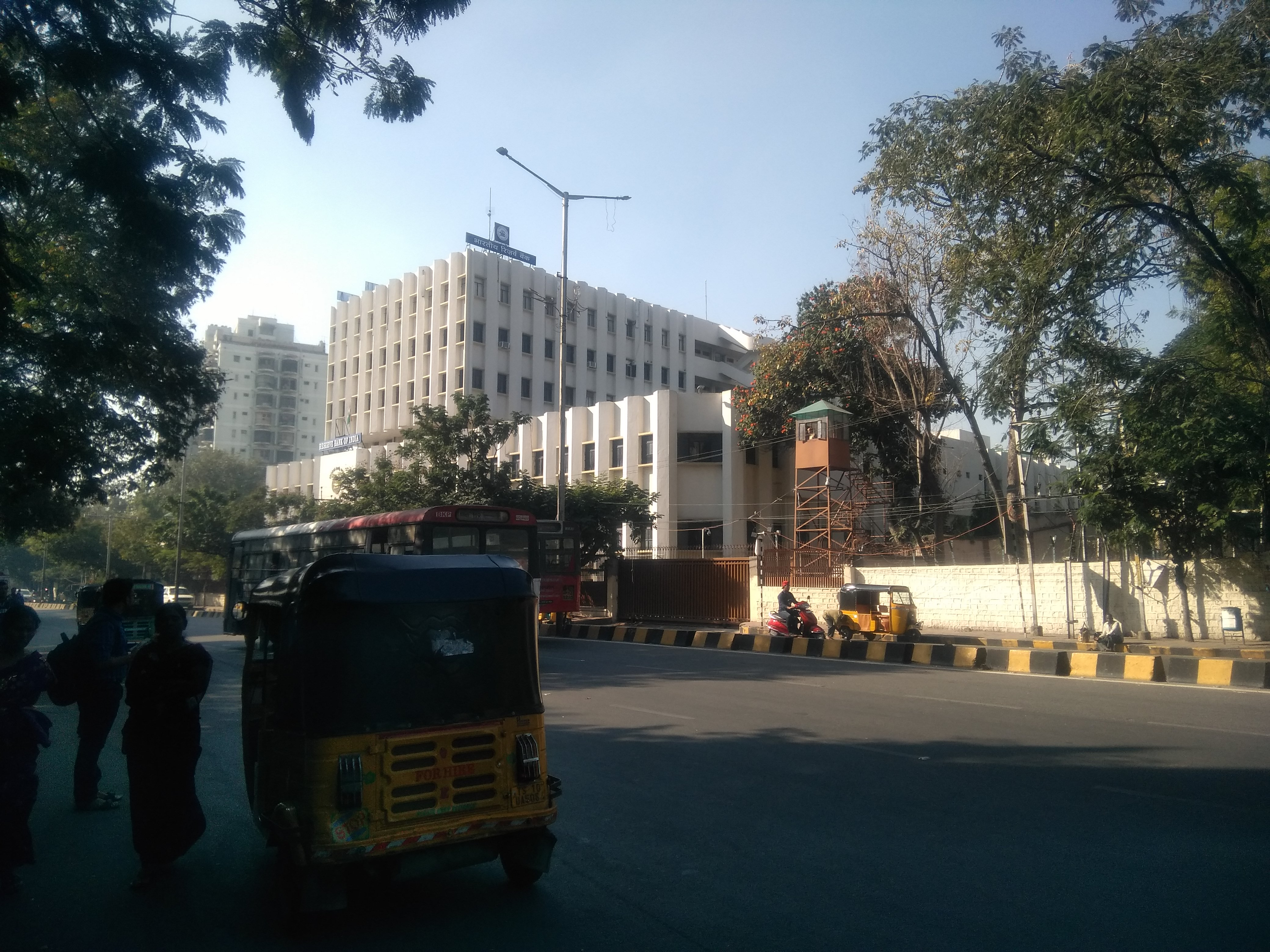
- Reserve Bank Of India at Khairatabad

- Location in Hyderabad, India Khairatabad (India)
- Coordinates: 17.436793°N 78.443906°E
- Country: India
- State: Telangana
- District: Hyderabad District
- Metro: Hyderabad
- Founded: 1626

Government
  - Body: GHMC
  - MLA: Danam Nagender

Population (2020)
  - Neighbourhood: 100,000
  - Metro: 600,000

Languages
  - Official: Telugu, Urdu
- Time zone: UTC+5:30 (IST)
- PIN: 500004
- Vehicle registration: TG-09
- Lok Sabha constituency: Secunderabad
- Vidhan Sabha constituency: Khairatabad
- Planning agency: GHMC
- Website: telangana.gov.in

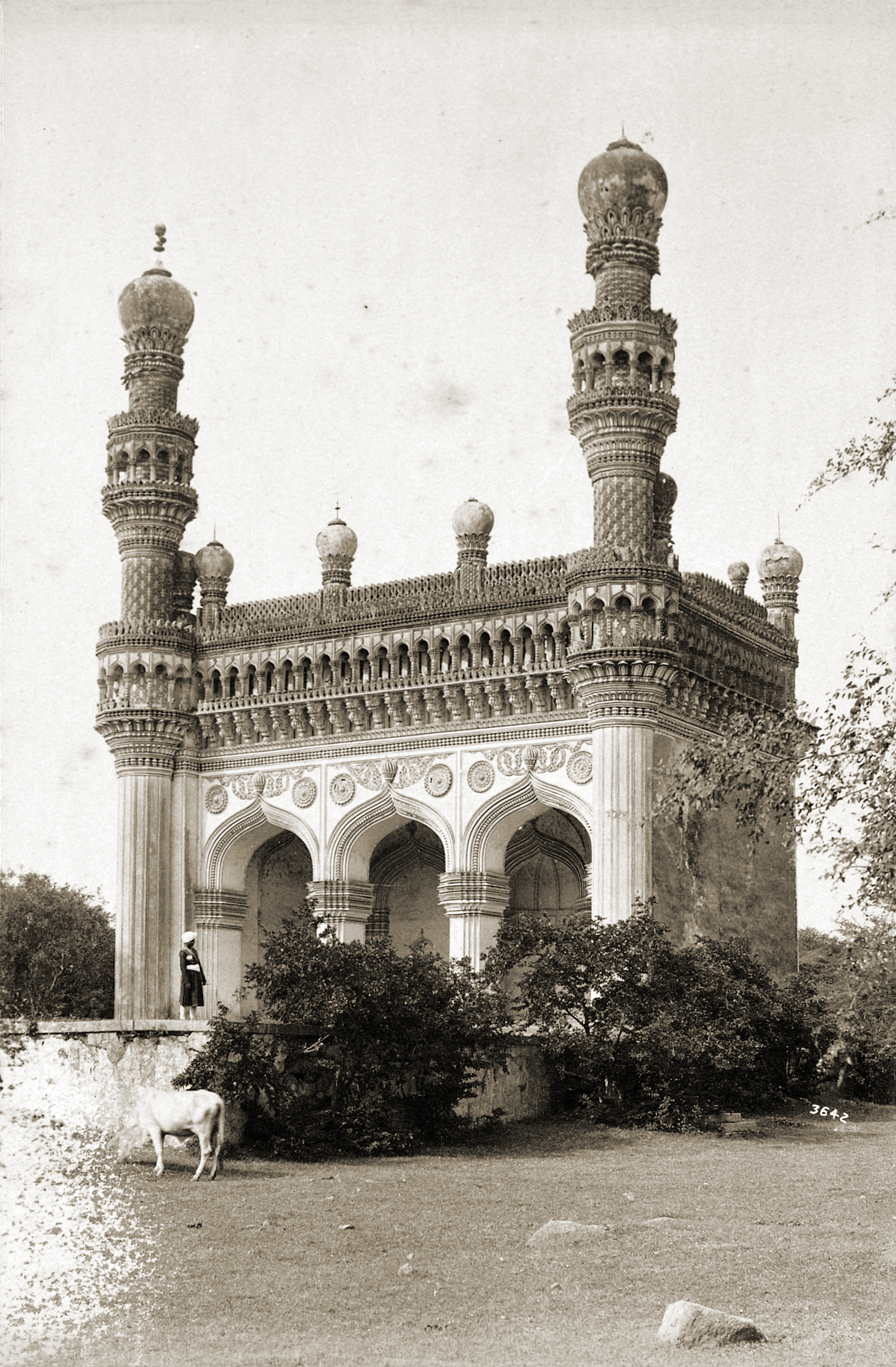
Khairtabad Mosque 1626. Photo, by Lala Deen Dayal in 1885

Khairatabad is a neighbourhood in Hyderabad, Telangana, India. It is a mandal in the Secunderabad Revenue division of Hyderabad District. This is a Zone in the Greater Hyderabad Municipal Corporation. There are five circles in this zone namely Mehdipatnam (12), Karwan (13), Goshamahal (14), Khairatabad (17) and Jubilee Hills (18). There are four wards under this Khairatabad circle, they are Khairtabad (91), Somajiguda (97), Ameerpet (98) and Sanathnagar (100).

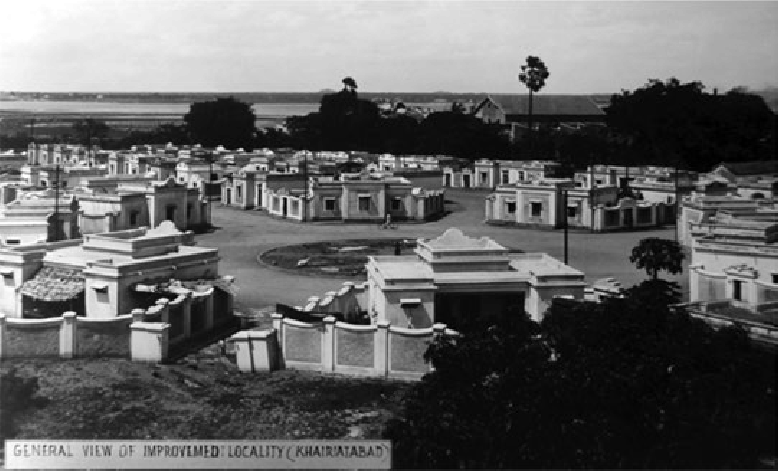
A view of Khairatabad housing scheme soon after completion in 1933

== Etymology ==
The area is named after a Khair-un-Nissa, whose tomb is located next to the Khairtabad Mosque though the access is to the back of the monument. This tomb could be that of Khair-un-Nissa, the wife of Captain James Achilles Kirkpatrick mentioned in the 2002 book White Mughals by William Dalrymple.

== The Idol and the Ganesha Chathurthi ==
The largest Lord Ganesha Idol in Hyderabad is installed near Khairtabad State Library during Ganesh chaturthi festival.

The local people participate in the 11-day festival and thousands of people from throughout India visit the Idol to seek the blessings of Lord Ganesha. On the 11th day, a procession carries the idol to Hussain Sagar Lake. After immersing the idol, the festival ends.

The local people formed the Ganesh Utsav Committee, Khairtabad to support the festival days. Many poor families survive by selling products to visitors.

Three months prior to festival day the construction of the idol begins. Nearly 200 workers led by a sculptor work day and night for three months to construct this large idol, towering nearly 58 feet in height.

Starting in 2018, the Ganesh Utsava Committee agreed to switch from plaster of Paris to an eco-friendly clay idol, although the first such 'Pancha Mukha Maha Lakshmi Ganapati' idol with special clay was made in 2022.

== Khairatabad circle ==
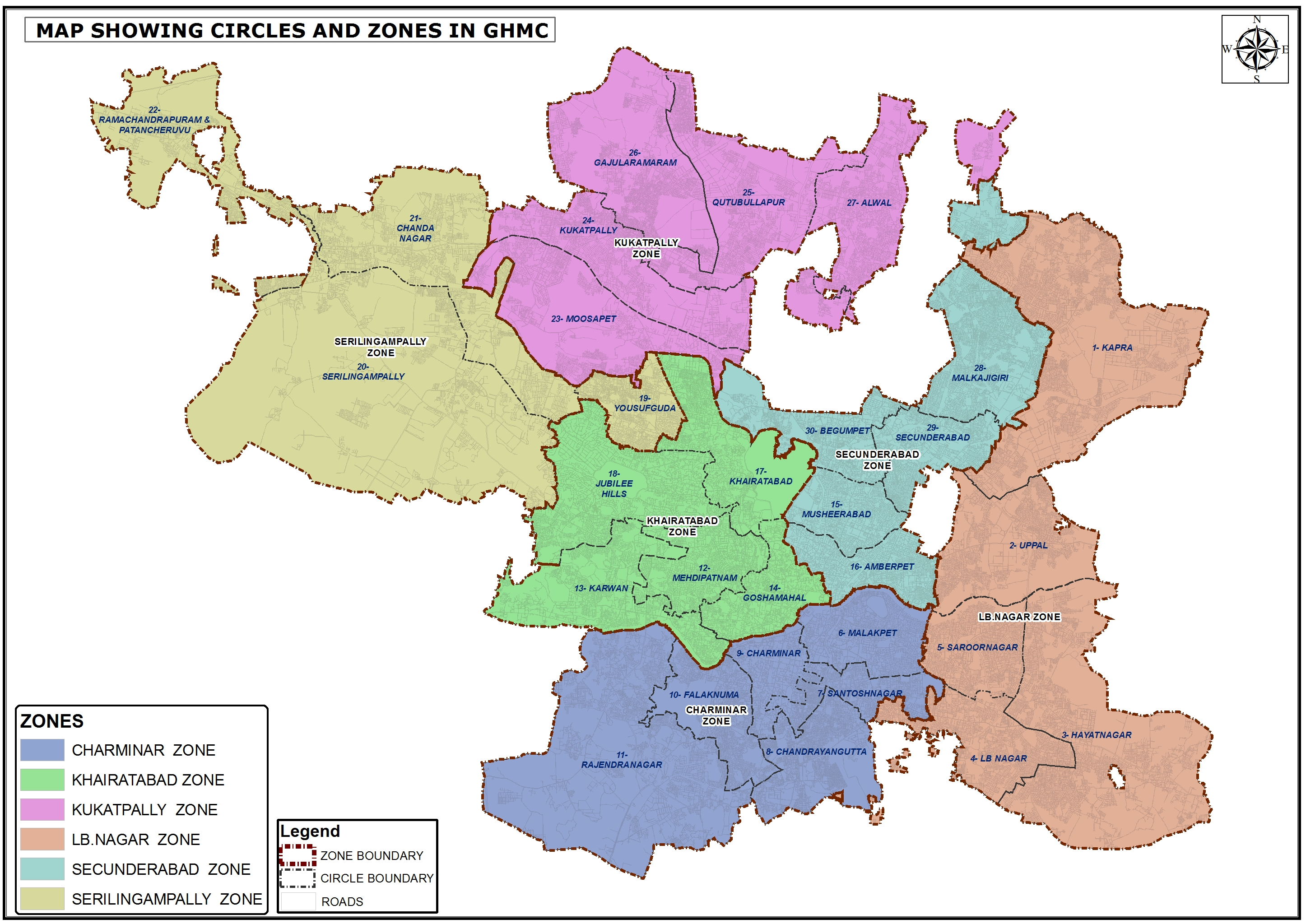
GHMC New Zones, Circles Map of 2019.

It has a junction of five roads called Khairatabad circle, among the busiest in the city. Those roads lead to Somajiguda, Ameerpet, Hussain sagar, Lakdi-ka-pul and Anandnagar. One such extension is Raj Bhavan Road, where the residence of the Governor of Telangana is located.

Notable institutions and organisations include the Institution of Engineers, Administrative Staff College of India, Road Transport Authority (RTA), TSTRANSCO & TSGENCO, HMWS&SB, Patel Building, Nasr School, Zilla Parishad, ZEE Telefilms, Press Club, Laymen's Evangelical Church Shadan Group of Educational Institutions etc.

The Vishweshwaraiah flyover starts at the circle and leads to Hussain sagar lake.

== Landmarks ==
- Bella Vista, Hyderabad
- Mint Compound
- Indian Institute of Engineers
- RTA
- Nasr School for Girls
- ZEE TELEFILMS
- Eenadu
- Tomb of Khairunnissa
- Press Club
- Telangana Electricity Board
- Government Degree College

== Transport ==
Khairatabad railway station is located here, which is served by Hyderabad Multi-Modal Transport System, a local train service. Buses are run by the state-owned TSRTC. Nearest Hyderabad Metro station is Khairatabad metro station.

== See also ==
- Khairatabad (Assembly constituency)
- A.C. Guards
- Kukatpally
- Miyapur
- Bachupally
