= Punjagutta =

Panjagutta
- Neighbourhood
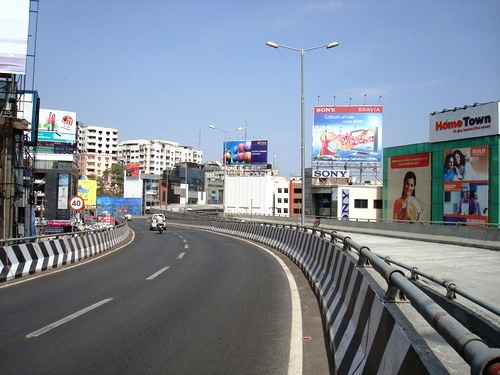
- New twin flyovers at Panjagutta circle

- Location in Hyderabad, India Panjagutta (India)
- Coordinates: 17.436793°N 78.443906°E
- Country: India
- State: Telangana
- District: Hyderabad
- Metro: Hyderabad
- Ward: 5

Government
  - Body: GHMC

Languages
  - Official: Telugu
- Time zone: UTC+5:30 (IST)
- PIN: 500082
- Vehicle registration: TG
- Parliament constituencies: Secunderabad (Lok Sabha constituency)
- Sasana Sabha constituencies: Khairatabad (Assembly constituency)
- Planning agency: GHMC
- Website: telangana.gov.in

Panjagutta is a commercial and residential area in western Hyderabad, India. The area contains IT hubs, shopping malls and jewellery shops. It is a major transit point for traffic between the Hyderabad districts of Ameerpet, Banjara hills, Somajiguda and Khairtabad. Twin flyovers across the road junction ease the previously heavy traffic flow.

== Etymology ==
The name Panjagutta means hand-mountain in Telugu, after a nearby peak.

== Institutes ==
- Nizam's Institute of Medical Sciences (NIMS) is also situated in here.
- Hamstech Institute of Fashion & Interior Design is located here.

== Transport ==
Hyderabad Metro has a metro station there to connect it to other parts of city. The buses run by TSRTC connect Panjagutta to all parts of the city. There is also a mini-bus service called Setwin service. The closest MMTS Train station is at Begumpet. BSNL office is situated in Durganagar Colony.
