= Lakdi ka pul =

- Neighbourhood
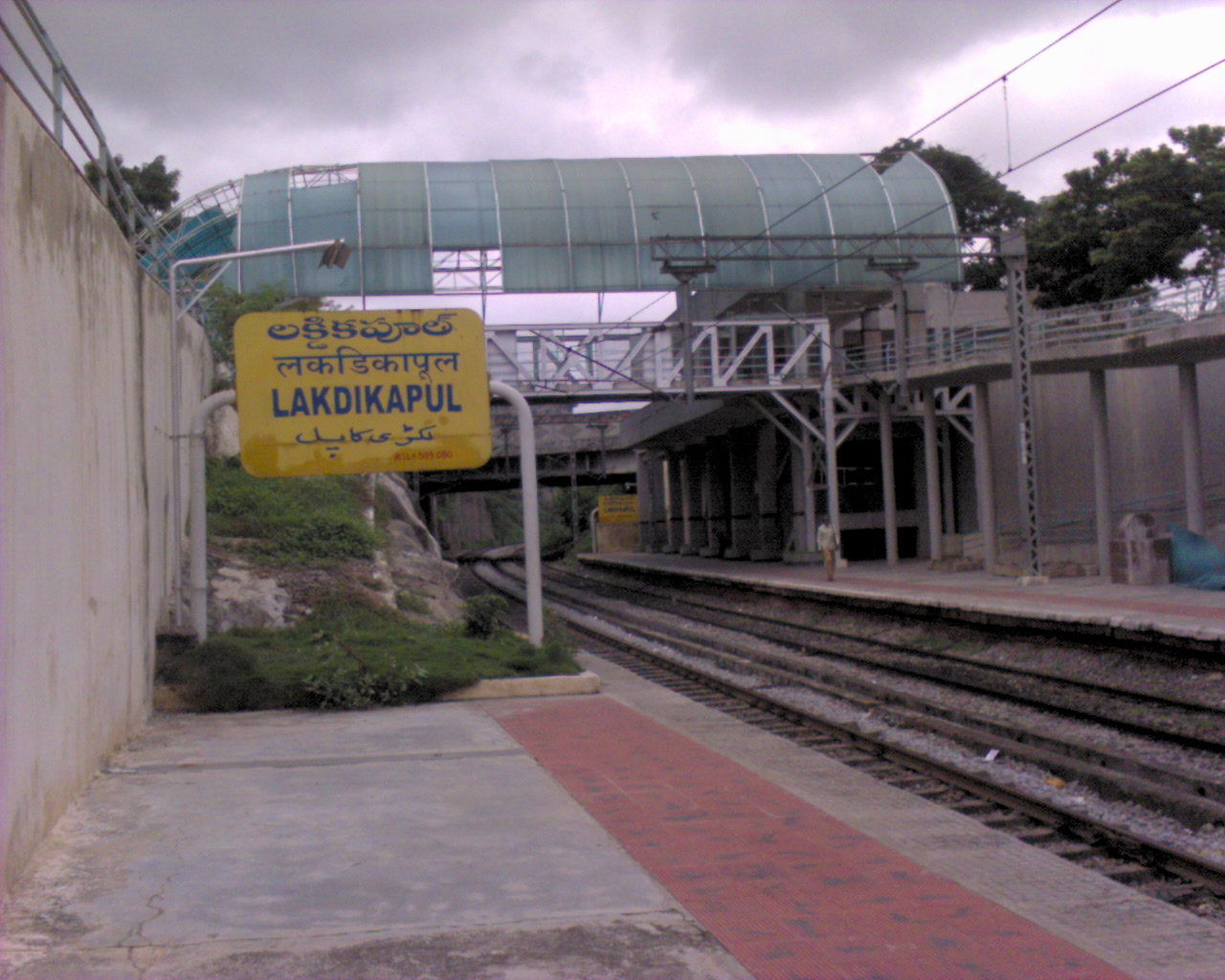
- Rail Station, Lakdi Ka Pul

- Location in Telangana, India Lakdi ka pul (Telangana) Lakdi ka pul (India)
- Coordinates: 17°24′10″N 78°28′1″E
- Country: India
- State: Telangana
- District: Hyderabad
- Metro: Hyderabad

Government
  - Body: GHMC

Languages
  - Official: Telugu
- Time zone: UTC+5:30 (IST)
- PIN: 500 004
- Vehicle registration: TG
- Lok Sabha constituency: Hyderabad
- Vidhan Sabha constituency: Malakpet
- Planning agency: GHMC
- Website: telangana.gov.in

Lakdi ka pul (lit: "the wooden bridge") is a neighbourhood in Hyderabad, India.

== Etymology ==
The area got its name from a bridge that was built over the railway line between Secunderabad and Nampally. The 27 feet (8.2 m) long bridge was built in the 1940s and was partially made of wood.

== Transport ==
Lakdikapul is well connected by road to other parts of the city. TSRTC runs its buses through the area.

The Lakdikapul railway station on the MMTS is located nearby. It is also served by the Lakdi-ka-pul metro station on the Red Line of the Hyderabad Metro.
