= Khairatabad metro station =

Metro station in Hyderabad, India

Khairatabad
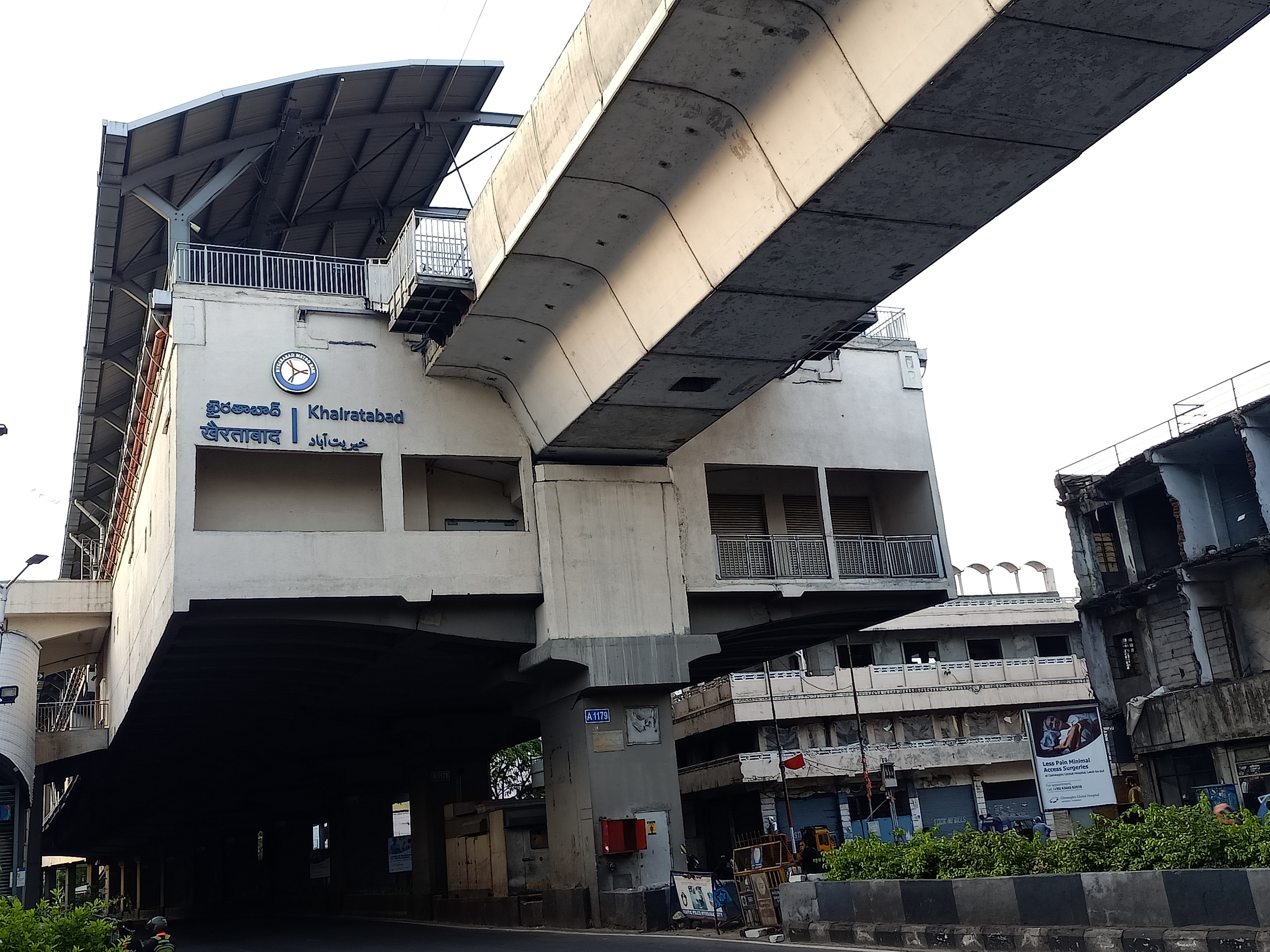

General information
- Location: 6/2/952/1/A, Khairatabad Rd, Hyderabad, Telangana 500004
- Coordinates: 17.41275°N 78.45803°E
- System: Hyderabad Metro station
- Line: Red Line
- Platforms: Side platform Platform-1 → Vasavi LB Nagar; Platform-2 →Miyapur
- Tracks: 2
- Connections: Khairatabad

Construction
- Structure type: Elevated, Double-track
- Platform levels: 2
- Parking: Available
- Cycle facilities: Available
- Accessible: Disabled access

Other information
- Status: Staffed, Operational

History
- Opened: 24 September 2018; 7 years ago
- Electrified: 25 kV 50 Hz AC through overhead catenary

Services
Preceding station	Hyderabad Metro	Following station
Irrum Manzil towards Miyapur	Red Line	Lakdi-ka-pul towards LB Nagar
Location
- Location within Telangana

The Khairatabad metro station is located on the Red Line of the Hyderabad Metro, India. This station was opened to public on 2017. It is near to Cement Corporation of India, Khairtabad railway station, ICICI Bank, Institute of engineers Limited, Dr Babasaheb Ambedkar Statue, Prasads I Max Road, Vegetable Market, Raj Bhavan Road, Administrative Staff College of India and Hanuman Temple.

== History ==
It was opened on 24 September 2018.

== The station ==
=== Structure ===
Khairatabad elevated metro station situated on the Red Line of Hyderabad Metro.

=== Facilities ===
The stations have staircases, elevators and escalators from the street level to the platform level which provide easy and comfortable access. Also, operation panels inside the elevators are installed at a level that can be conveniently operated by all passengers, including disabled and elderly citizens.

=== Station layout ===
Street Level
This is the first level where passengers may park their vehicles and view the local area map.

Concourse level
Ticketing office or Ticket Vending Machines (TVMs) is located here. Retail outlets and other facilities like washrooms, ATMs, first aid, etc., will be available in this area.

Platform level
This layer consists of two platforms. Trains takes passengers from this level.

G	Street level	Exit/Entrance
L1	Mezzanine	Fare control, station agent, Metro Card vending machines, crossover
L2	Side platform | Doors will open on the left
L2	Platform 1 Southbound	Towards → Vasavi LB Nagar next station is NMDC Lakdi-ka-pul
L2	Platform 2 Northbound	Towards ← Miyapur next station is Irrum Manzil
L2	Side platform | Doors will open on the left
L2

== Entry/exit ==
Khairatabad station Entry/exits
Gate No-A	Gate No-B	Gate No-C	Gate No-D

== See also ==
- Hyderabad
- Transport in Hyderabad
- List of rapid transit systems
- List of metro systems
