= Ameerpet metro station =

Metro station in Hyderabad, India

Ameerpet
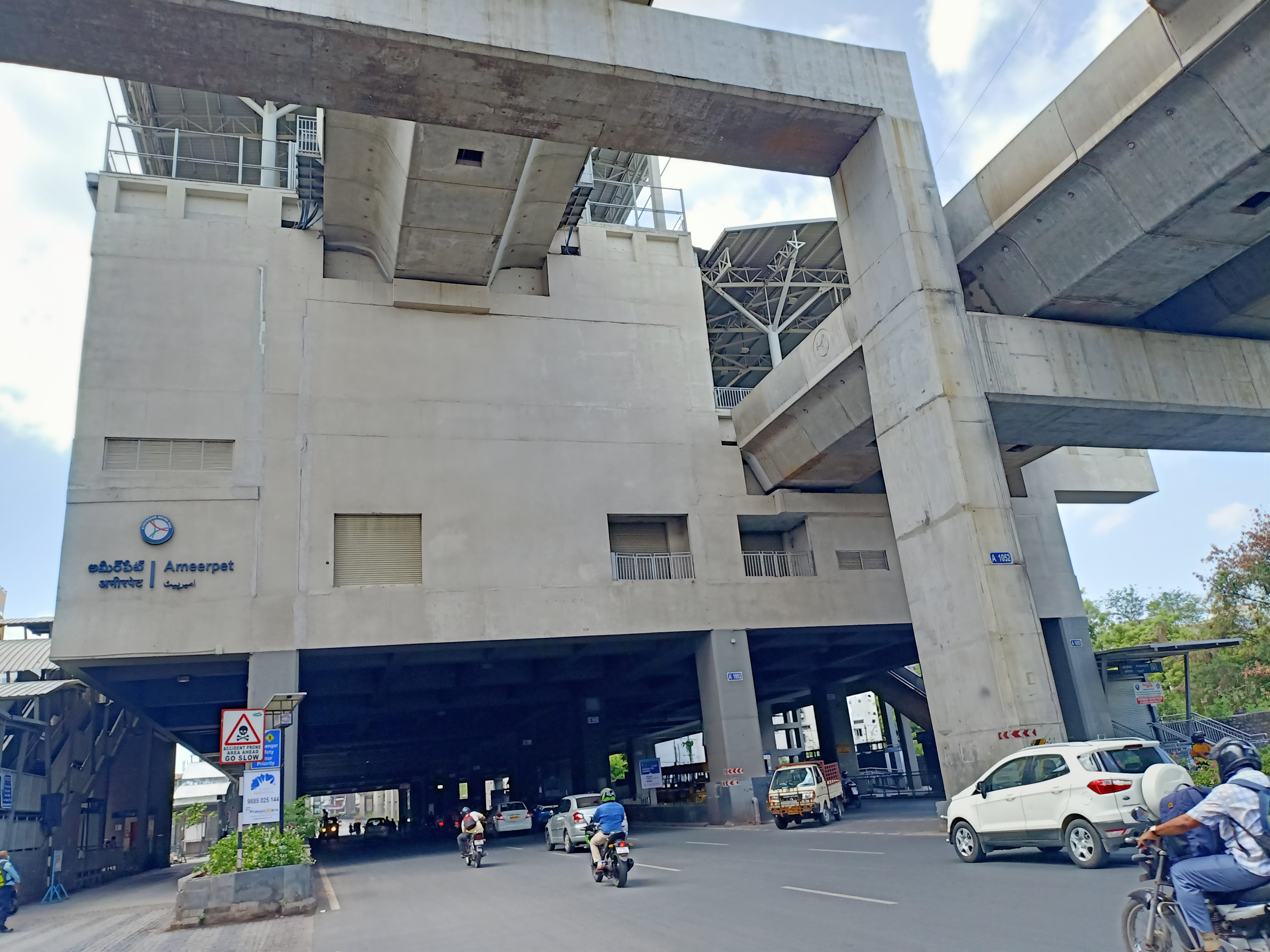
- Ameerpet metro station

General information
- Location: Sanjeeva Reddy Nagar Main Road, Sri Nagar Colony, Ameerpet, Hyderabad, Telangana, 500016
- Coordinates: 17°26′5.29″N 78°26′52.84″E
- System: Hyderabad Metro station
- Owner: Larsen & Toubro (90%); Government of Telangana (10%)
- Operator: Hyderabad Metro Rail Ltd.
- Line: Red Line Blue Line
- Platforms: 4; Red Line : 2 side platforms; Blue Line : 2 side platforms
- Tracks: 4
- Connections: TSRTC, Auto rickshaw, Taxi

Construction
- Structure type: Elevated, Double track
- Platform levels: 2
- Parking: Available
- Accessible: Yes

History
- Opened: 29 November 2017; 8 years ago

Services
Preceding station	Hyderabad Metro	Following station
S.R. Nagar towards Miyapur	Red Line	Punjagutta towards LB Nagar
Taruni Madhura Nagar towards Raidurg	Blue Line	Begumpet towards Nagole
Track layout
Location
- Location within Hyderabad Location within Telangana Location within India

Ameerpet metro station is an interchange metro station between the Red Line and Blue Line of the Hyderabad Metro. The Ameerpet Inter-change Metro Station is one of the largest metro stations in India with a sprawling premises over 200,000 square feet (19,000 m^{2}). Ameerpet metro station is one of the busiest metro stations in Hyderabad with daily footfalls of around 32,000 commuters.

== History ==
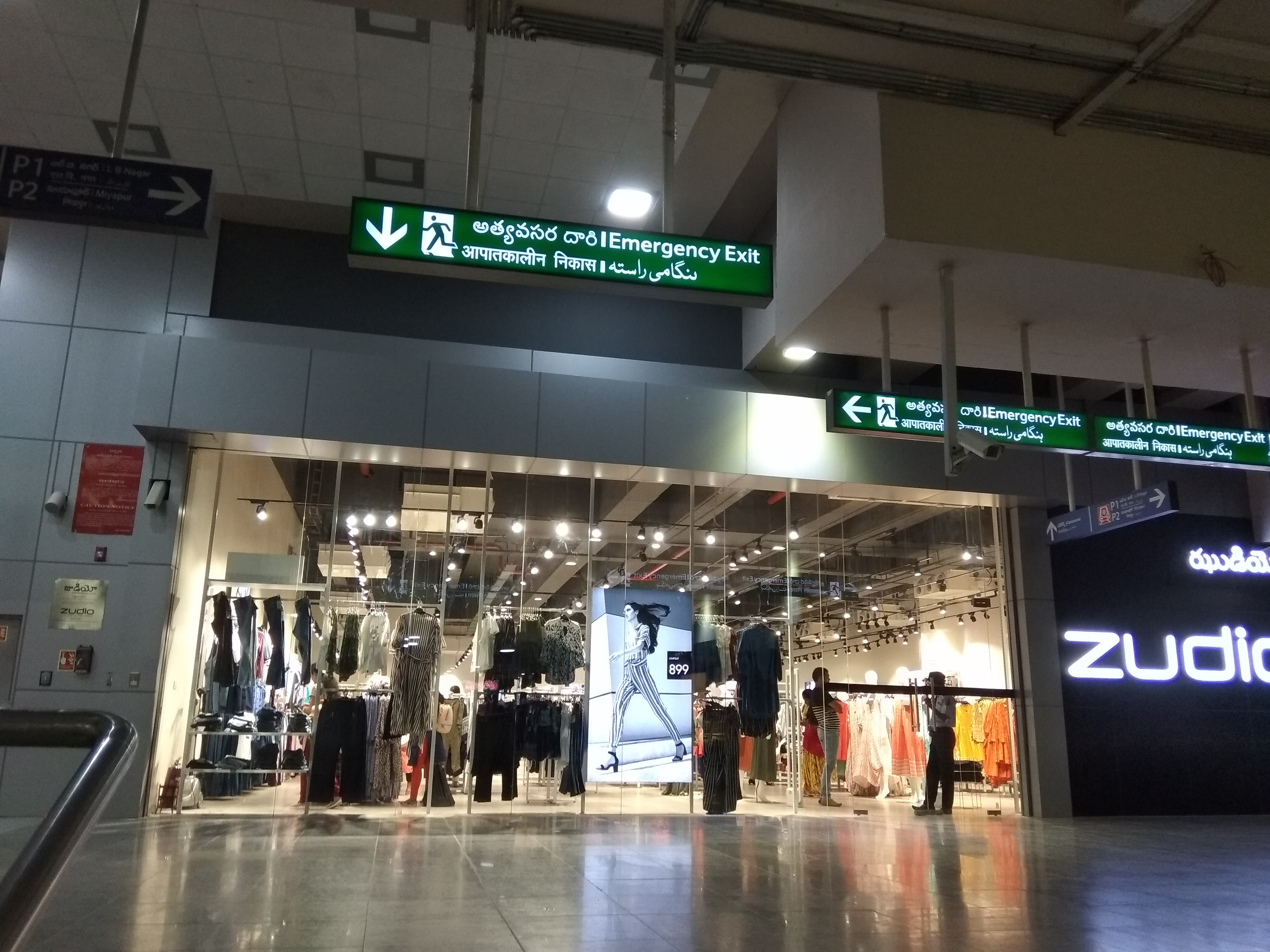
Ameerpet metro outlets

The station was opened on 29 November 2017.

On 22 September 2019, a 27-year-old woman named K Mounika died in a freak accident when a concrete slab, which peeled off when she took shelter during rain, fell off from a height of 9 metres at pillar number A-1053 of the Ameerpet metro station and hit her head. She was admitted to Aster Prime Hospital in Ameerpet where she succumbed to her injuries. Hyderabad metro authority paid ₹ 20 lakhs as compensation to the victim's family. L&T said it would provide another Rs 15 lakh from an insurance company and job to a family member. A case was registered against L&T under Section 304-A (Negligence causing death) of the IPC. A day after the incident, Minister for Municipal Administration and Urban Development K. T. Rama Rao instructed Hyderabad Metro Rail authorities to conduct a thorough investigation and check all structures and facilities in detail to prevent such an incident from occurring again.

== Facilities ==
Ameerpet metro station is a busy commercial spot where there are several outlets selling apparel, biryani, shawarma, tea etc. L&THMRL has set up free wifi access units for commuters at Ameerpet metro station, in association with ACT Fibernet, as part of a pilot project.

== Station layout ==
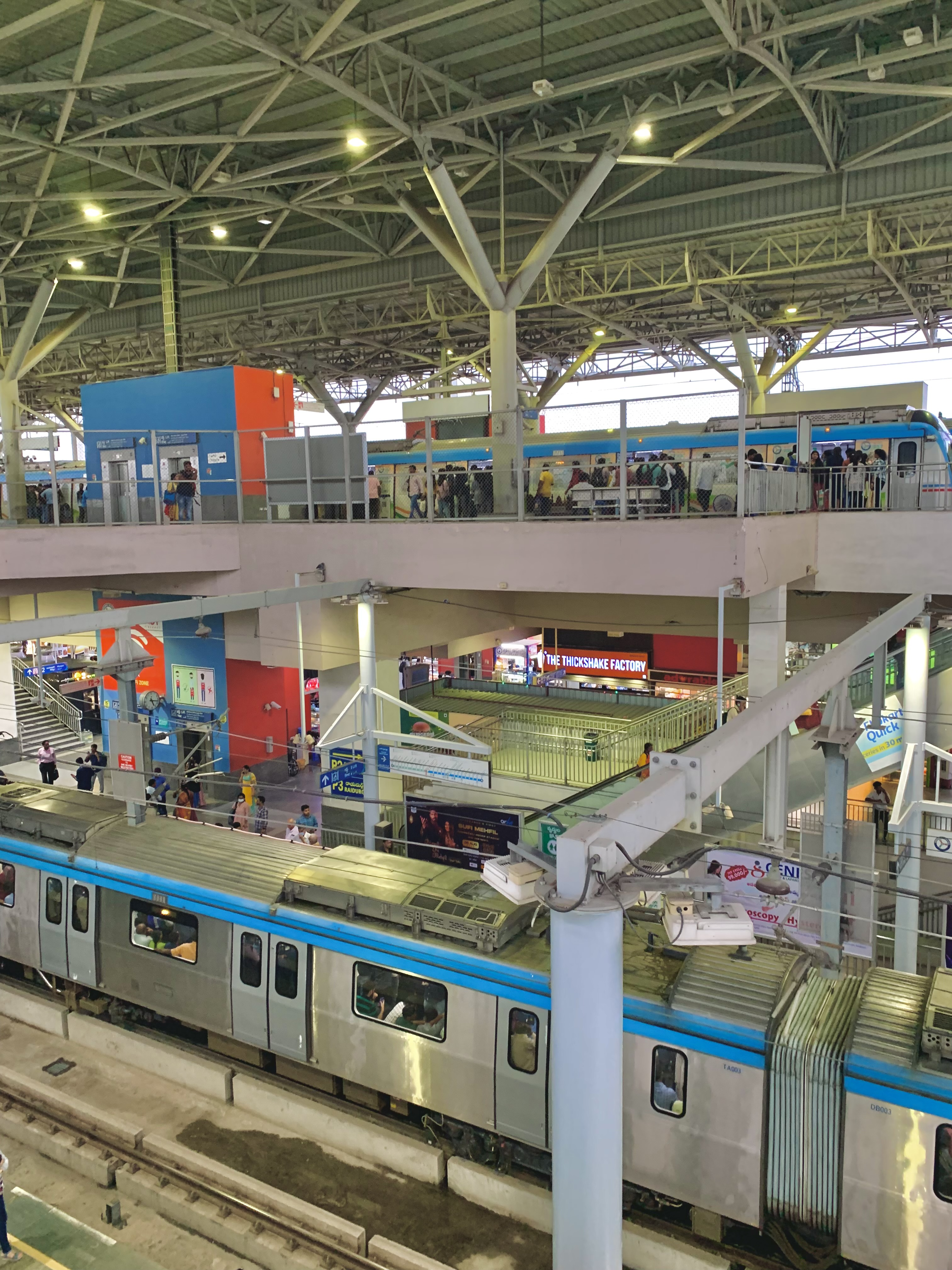
The two levels of platform at Ameerpet metro station

Street Level
This is the first level where passengers may park their vehicles and view the local area map.

Concourse level
Ticketing office or Ticket Vending Machines (TVMs) is located here. Retail outlets and other facilities like washrooms, ATMs, first aid, etc., will be available in this area.

Platform level
This layer consists of two platforms. Trains takes passengers from this level.

L2; Platforms
L2; Platforms	Side platform, doors will open on the left
L2; Platforms	Platform 1	Red Line towards LB Nagar (Punjagutta) →
L2; Platforms	Platform 2	← Red Line towards Miyapur (S.R. Nagar)
L2; Platforms	Side platform, doors will open on the left
L1; Platforms	Concourse	clothing and food stalls
L1; Platforms	Side platform, doors will open on the left
L1; Platforms	Platform 4	Blue Line towards Nagole (Begumpet) →
L1; Platforms	Platform 3	← Blue Line towards Raidurg (Taruni Madhura Nagar)
L1; Platforms	Side platform, doors will open on the left
M	Mezzanine	Fare control, station agent, Metro Card vending machines, crossover
G	Street level	Exit/Entrance

== Entrances and exits ==
Mezzanine (M)

- A - Image Hospital / Punjagutta Circle
- B - Sarathi Studios / Yousufgunda Road
- C - Maitrivanam / Aditya Enclave
- D - Balkampet Road / MCH Market
