= Somajiguda =

Somajiguda Somajigudem
- City Centre
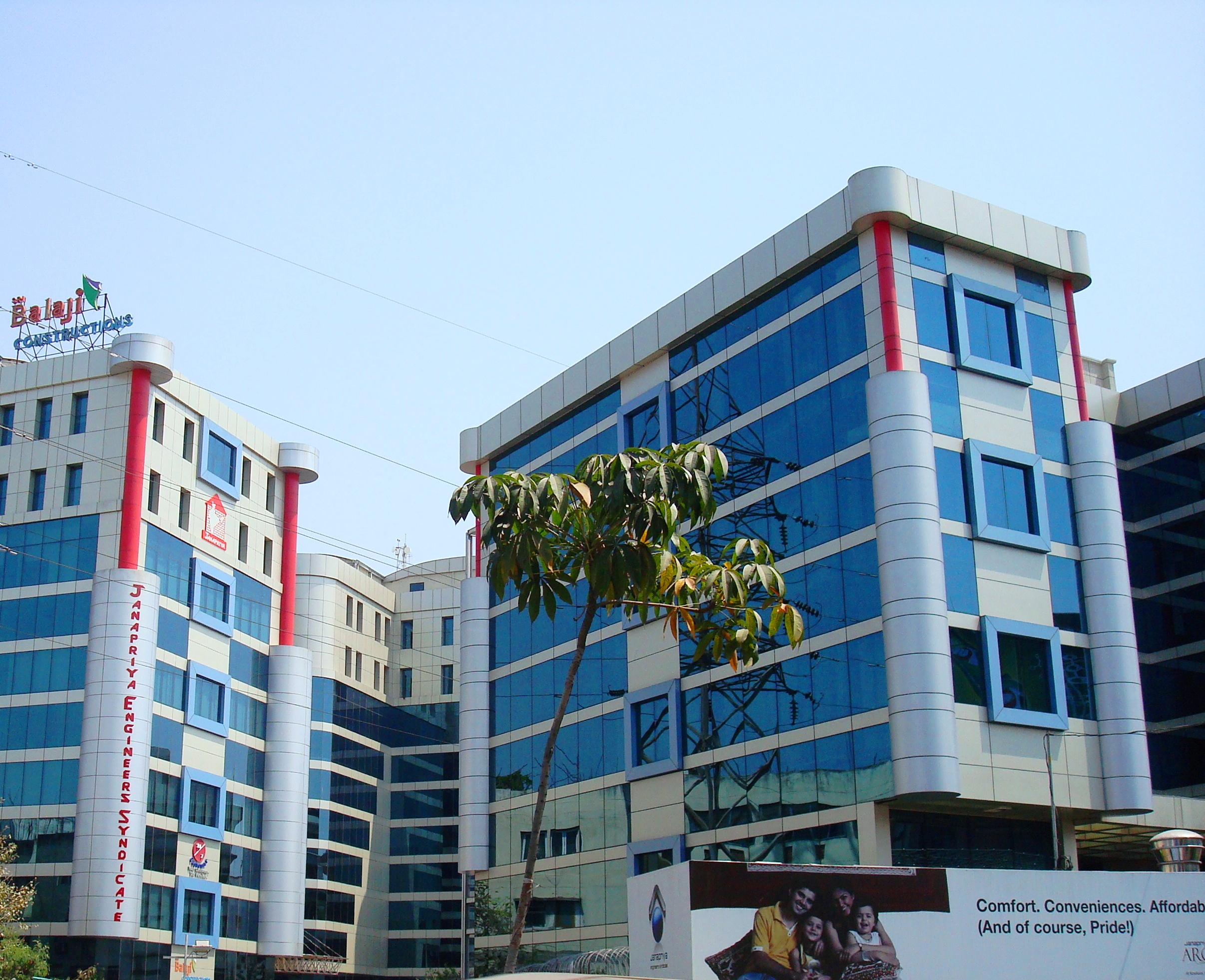
- Fortune towers at Somajiguda

- Location in Hyderabad, Telangana, India Somajiguda (Telangana) Somajiguda (India)
- Coordinates: 17.428911°N 78.455343°E
- Country: India
- State: Telangana
- District: Hyderabad
- Metro: Hyderabad
- Named for: Sonaji Pandit

Languages
  - Official: Telugu
- Time zone: UTC+5:30 (IST)
- PIN: 500082
- Vehicle registration: TG
- Parliament constituencies: Secunderabad
- Sasana Sabha constituencies: Khairtabad
- Planning agency: GHMC
- Website: telangana.gov.in

Somajiguda is a locality of Hyderabad located on either side of Raj Bhavan Road. It started as a residential locality but slowly transformed into a modern business centre in Hyderabad. It is a hub of commercial activity with many jewellery, automobile and banking establishments running their businesses from here. Popular landmarks are Raj Bhavan, The Park and Yashoda hospital. Somajiguda has also gained importance because of its proximity to city centres such as Begumpet, Punjagutta and Khairtabad. The official residence of Governor of State of Telangana - the Raj Bhavan is in Somajiguda.

== Etymology ==
Somajiguda is named after Sonaji Pandit, a Daftardar (revenue officer) in the estate of Raja Rai Rayan, a nobleman of Hyderabad in 1853. A mansion was built by the then Raja of the Rai Rayan estate during the rule of Nasir-ud-Daulah for Sonaji Pandit to honour his service. Sonaji Pandit resided in this mansion his entire life. Over time Sonaji-Guda (Guda meaning place in the local dialect of Telugu) became Somajiguda.

== Economy ==
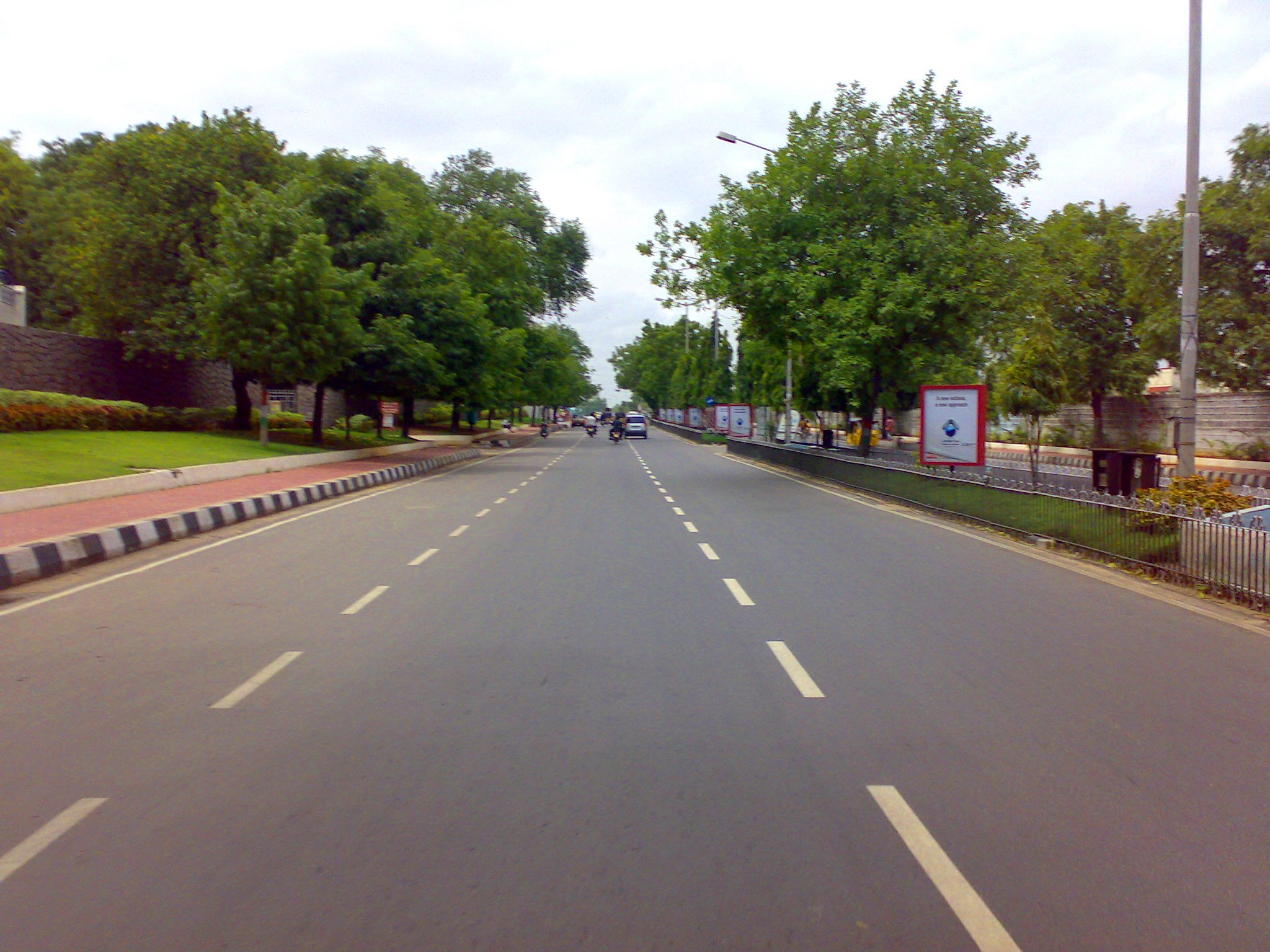
Raj Bhavan Road

Raj Bhavan Road, Somajiguda

=== Automobile ===
Somajiguda is a hub for automobile sales with showrooms of Honda, Skoda, Volkswagen, Maruti Suzuki, Nexa, Hero, Yamaha, Bajaj and TVS. This led to many car interior refurbishing shops setting up their business there, some tying up with international brands like 3M.

=== Health & Fitness ===
Somajiguda has the largest number of Health and Fitness products stores in the city.

=== Banking ===
Somajiguda is home to international banking institutions such as the Standard Chartered, Bank of Mauritius, HDFC, HSBC, and Bank of Kuwait. Many Indian banks like State Bank of India, IndusInd, Canara Bank, Karnataka Bank, Kotak Mahindra, South Indian Bank, and Yes Bank have their regional offices or branches there.

=== Commercial and IT ===
Companies such as ADP, Cavium, Vijai Electrical, Creamline Dairy Products Ltd., Pitti Laminations Ltd., Sri Chakra Cements, Geo infospace Pvt LTD, Ramky Industries, BlueDart, Reliance Jio and many others operate their businesses in Somajiguda. Babukhan Millennium Centre and Fortune Towers are two prominent commercial office space providers.

=== Hospitals, medicine and emergency ===
- Yashoda Hospitals
- Deccan Hospital
- Matrika Hospital
- Maxivision Eye Hospital
- Vijaya Diagnostics
- Zoi Hospital

=== Hotels and hospitality ===
Seven to three-star hotels such as The Park, Katriya hotel & towers, IK London and others are located in Somajiguda. Real estate activities in the neighbourhood has grown, with newer structures coming up in this area.

=== Shopping and entertainment ===
Somajiguda is also a shopping centre with brands lined up at Somajiguda circle, including over 30 jewellery showrooms within a stretch of half a kilometre.

==== Food ====
KFC, Pizza Hut, and Sanjos Donuts are located right next to the Necklace Road MMTS station.

==== Pubs and restaurants ====
Headquarters is a popular rest-o-bar on Raj Bhavan Road. Aish, Aqua and Carbon are popular watering-hole(s) and restaurant(s) in The Park.

== Education ==
- Nasr School Pre Primary
- Roots International School of Business Management (www.roots.ac.in)
- Vila Marie - college for women offering courses from intermediate through degree and master's programmes.
- Blueberry Kids
- Mt Helicon Public School
- Sri Sri Ravishankar Vidya Mandir
- Zikra High School
- Hamstech Institute of Fashion and Interior Design
- ROOTS college of hotel management and culinary arts (www.rhmca.ac.in)
- ROOTS junior college (www. rjc.ac.in)
- Digiquest Institute of Creative Arts & Design Offers Creative Engineering Multimedia bachelor's degree Programmes in Game Development & Computer Science, VR/AR, Game Art & Design, Animation & Visual Effects, Photography, Rajbhavan Road, Somajiguda.

== Government ==
Many government buildings are located in Somajiguda. These include

- Administrative Staff College of India
- Lake View Guest House
- Raj Bhavan
- Government Nursing School
- Dilkusha Guest House
- Andhra Pradesh Dairy Development Corporation Ltd.
- National Institute of Amateur Radio (HAM)

== Localities ==
- Raj Bhavan Road
- Jaffar Ali Bagh
- Durga Nagar Colony
- Asif Avenue
- Kapadia Lane
- Gulmohar Avenue
- Matha Nagar Colony
- BS Makhta
- MS Maktha

== Public transport and connectivity ==
Somajiguda is connected by TSRTC buses. The closest MMTS stations are Necklace Road, Khairtabad and 2 kilometers away Begumpet. The closest Metro stations are Panjagutta and Khairtabad.
