= Punjagutta metro station =

Metro station in Hyderabad, India

Punjagutta

General information
- Location: 8-2-340/1, Punjagutta Rd, Punjagutta Officers Colony, Hyderabad, Telangana 500082
- Coordinates: 17.436793°N 78.443906°E
- System: Hyderabad Metro station
- Line: Red Line
- Tracks: 2

Construction
- Structure type: Elevated
- Depth: 7.07 m (23.2 ft)
- Platform levels: 2

History
- Opened: 24 September 2018; 7 years ago

Services
Preceding station	Hyderabad Metro	Following station
Ameerpet towards Miyapur	Red Line	Irrum Manzil towards LB Nagar
Location

The Punjagutta Metro Station is located on the Red Line of the Hyderabad Metro in India. It is part of Corridor I of the Hyderabad Metro starting from Miyapur and was opened to the public on 24 September 2018.

== History ==
It was opened to the public on 24 September 2018. In October 2022, Punjagutta metro station was awarded Indian Green Building Council (IGBC) Green MRTS Certification with the highest platinum rating under elevated stations category.

== Facilities ==
A skywalk and public space has been constructed between Metro mall (Hyderabad Next Galleria) at Panjagutta and the Metro station. The Metro Rail viaduct at Punjagutta was built in four months by Larsen & Toubro Hyderabad Metro Rail.

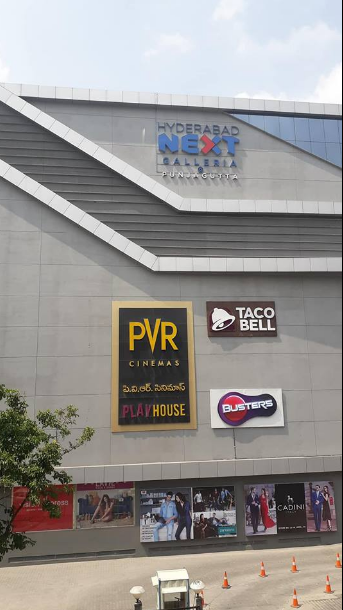
Hyderabad Next Galleria) at Panjagutta

=== Station layout ===
Street Level
This is the first level where passengers may park their vehicles and view the local area map.

Concourse level
Ticketing office or Ticket Vending Machines (TVMs) is located here. Retail outlets and other facilities like washrooms, ATMs, first aid, etc., will be available in this area.

Platform level
This layer consists of two platforms. Trains takes passengers from this level.

G	Street level	Exit/Entrance
L1	Mezzanine	Fare control, station agent, Metro Card vending machines, crossover
L2	Side platform | Doors will open on the left
L2	Platform 1 Southbound	Towards → Vasavi LB Nagar next station is Irrum Manzil
L2	Platform 2 Northbound	Towards ← Miyapur next station is Ameerpet Change at the next station for Blue Line
L2	Side platform | Doors will open on the left
L2
