= Nasr School =

- Khairtabad, Somajiguda, Gachibowli, Hyderabad; India

Information
- School type: Private School
- Motto: With God's Help, Victory is Near.
- Established: 12 June 1965 by Begum Anees Khan
- Faculty: 650
- Key people: Late Begum Anees Khan, Founder & Chairperson, Nasr Education Society.; Nawab Mir Khutubuddin Khan, Secretary, Nasr Education Society; Begum Salwa Khan, Director & Advisor, Nasr Education Society; Mir Hafeezuddin Ahmed, Chief Executive Officer, Nasr Education Society & Principal (Boys); Mir Mohiuddin Mohammed, Director Academics, Nasr Education Society & Principal (Girls); Mir Jamaluddin Hammad www.mirjamaluddinhammad.com, Director Finance, Nasr Education Society.
- Grades: Nursery-12th grade (Girls) Nursery- 12th grade (Boys)
- Enrollment: 8,000
- Campus type: Suburban
- Colours: Olive Green, White
- Website: www.nasrschool.in

Nasr School is a private school chain in Hyderabad, Telangana, India, run by The Nasr Education Society and affiliated to Council for the Indian School Certificate Examinations(CISCE). Nasr Education Society celebrated its Golden Jubilee year in 2015.

It was founded by late Begum Anees Khan for her daughter, Aliya, in June 1965 with the help of Mrs. Raees Hassan and Begum Najamuddin Khan.

The meaning of the word Nasr in Arabic is "help".

== Nasr Education Society ==
The Nasr Education Society manages the Nasr Group of Institutions and is headed by Begum Anees Khan as the chairperson and Nawab Mir Khutubuddin Khan as the Secretary.

== Locations ==
The Nasr Education Society runs Nasr Schools in four locations in Hyderabad. There is Nasr Pre-Primary School at Somajiguda and Gachibowli, Nasr School for Girls at Khairtabad and Nasr School for Boys at Gachibowli. The Society also runs a school for underprivileged girls in Somajiguda and charges no fee for their education. They provide free books, uniforms, and food to these girls and aim to uplift the living standards of these girls by educating them.

== Student activities ==
The school organizes many competitions and activities. Nasr is home to a number of clubs, which are popular among students such as The Nasr Dramatic Society (NDS), The Nature Club, The Literary Club, The Red Cross, The Interact Club and the Nasr Riding Club. The school students are also encouraged to take part in social activities. Additionally, an annual magazine, "Echo", is brought out by the staff and students. The editorial board includes a Student Editor, Staff Editors, Creative Editors, Main Reporters, etc.

A concept in Nasr is the democratic way of electing the student leaders known as the Office Bearers headed by the School Captain. After a rigorous process of nominations on the basis of Academics and Overall Participation, Elections are held in which the students vote and elect their representatives. The Office Bearers are responsible of leading the school and helping the management in organizing various events. There is a School Captain, Vice Captain, Sports Captain and the various House Captains and prefects. Each Club has its own set of Office Bearers. Both the Girls' and Boys' School Office Bearers meet regularly to discuss and formulate plans for maintaining discipline among the students, and to organise various educational and extra-curricular activities.

Regular excursions are also embarked upon. They may be in the form of House excursions or Class excursions. There is usually an educative element to these trips. The students are also taken to tourist locations in different cities and towns.

Intra- and inter-school contests are held in order to encourage students to participate in extra-curricular activities and showcase their various talents. These may be in the varied fields of literature, public speaking, sports, music, art, etc. Many sports activities are available such as: Volleyball, Basketball, Marching, Karate, etc. The director of physical education is Bandela Prakash Rao known around the school as Bishop Sir.

=== Nasr Dramatic Society ===
The Nasr Dramatic Society (NDS) was established in 1980 for the Girls School at Khairatabad and in the year 2004 for Nasr Boys at Gachibowli. The dramatic society was founded with a view to nurture the talent of young thespians, their creativity, and their intellectualism. NDS's plays are often staged in Hyderabad's theatres. The Nasr Dramatic Society of Nasr Girls & Boys is the youngest and the only school dramatic club to be affiliated to the National School of Drama in Delhi.

=== Nasr Riding Club ===
Nasr Riding Club was founded in 1999 under the guidance of the Secretary of Nasr Education Society, Nawab Mir Khutubuddin Khan. The club has its own string of horses. The club members take part in many on- and off-field activities.

=== Nasr Nature Club ===
The school has club wings for both Nasr Boys' School, Gachibowli and Nasr School, Khairatabad. The Nasr Nature Club (Boys) adopted Vikas, a one year old Royal Bengal Tiger at Nehru Zoological Park on 13 January 2015. The school students take part in raising funds for "Project Tiger" too.

== Alumni ==
Alumni include tennis player Sania Mirza, actress, model, and Miss Asia Pacific 2000, Dia Mirza, IPS and Additional Director General of Police (Sports), Tejdeep Kaur Menon, Former Tennis Player Mishgahn Omer writer/ journalist Anuradha Roy, and writer and filmmaker, Nidheya Suresh.

== Awards ==
- Nasr School - India School Ranking 2017 (ranked number 1 day school for girls in Andhra / Telangana and Number 1 in Hyderabad; Ranked Number 5 in India) - Education World.
- Nasr Boys School - India School Ranking 2017 (ranked number 1 day school for boys in Andhra / Telangana and Number 1 in Hyderabad; Ranked Number 7 in India) - Education World.
- National Award for Meritorious Service - received by Mrs. Madhubala Kapoor, principal of Nasr School for Girls, in the year 2009.
- Acharya Devo Bhava - 2014 Award - Brainfeed Magazine - received by Mir Hafeezuddin Ahmed, Principal (Nasr Boys School).
- Bharath Shiksha Ratan Award by Global Achiever Foundation - received by Mir Hafeezuddin Ahmed, Principal (Nasr Boys School).
- Excellence Award (2014) to Nasr School - WCRC Leaders.
- Nasr was named as one of the fastest growing brands in India, one of the Top 100 best Schools in Asia and as one of The Most Promising Brands of India by WCRC Magazine.
