= Irrum Manzil metro station =

Station of the Hyderabad Metro

Irrum Manzil
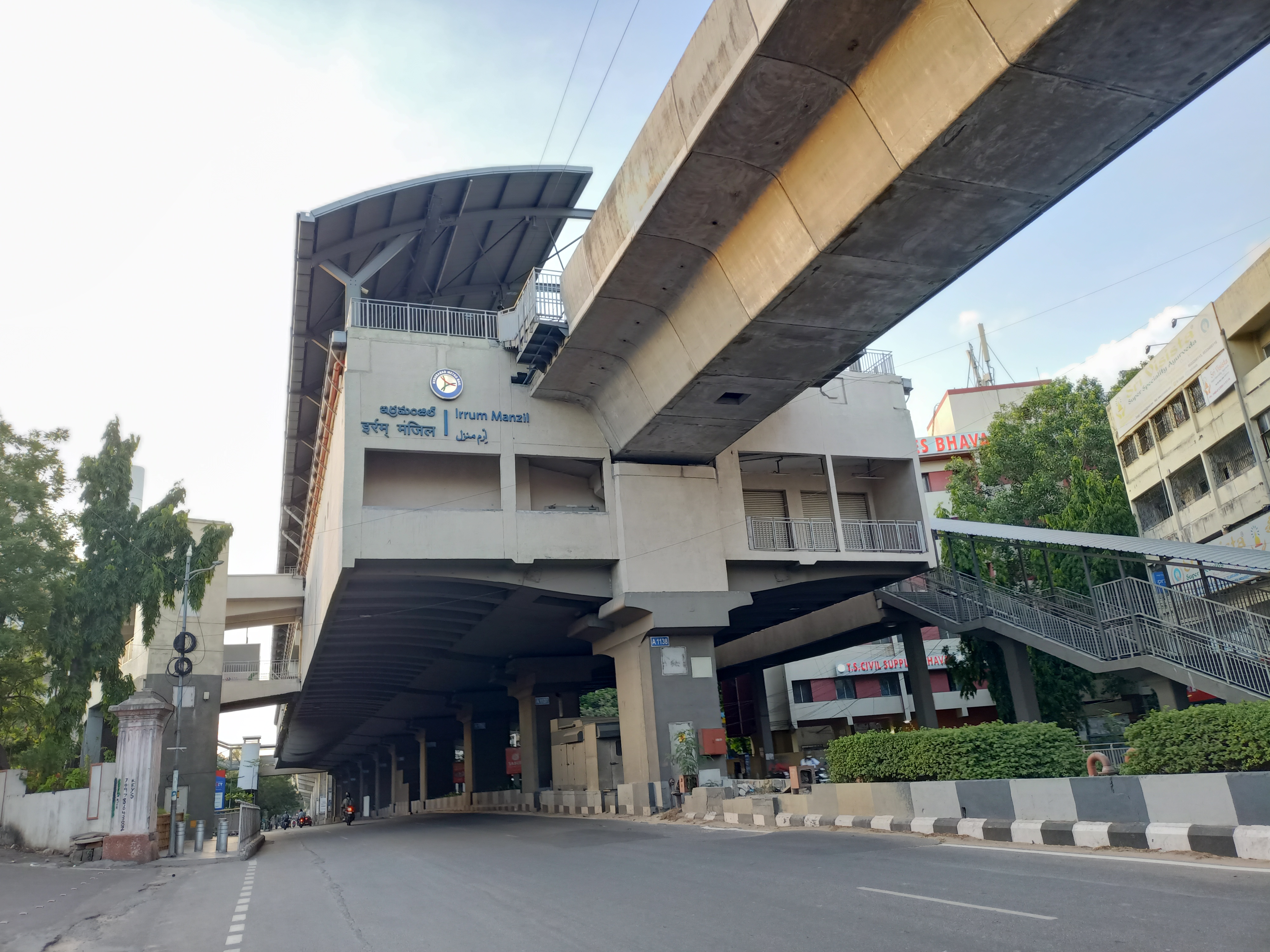

General information
- Location: Hyderabad
- Coordinates: 17.4204695°N 78.4539726°E
- System: Hyderabad Metro station
- Owner: Hyderabad Metro
- Line: Red Line

Construction
- Structure type: Elevated

Other information
- Website: ltmetro.com/metro_stations/irrumanzil/

Services
Preceding station	Hyderabad Metro	Following station
Punjagutta towards Miyapur	Red Line	Khairatabad towards LB Nagar
Location

The Irrum Manzil Metro Station is a station of the Hyderabad Metro, in India.

== History ==
Irrum Manzil station was named after Errum Manzil, a historic palace located near the station. The station opened in 2017.

== Station layout ==
Street Level
This is the first level where passengers may park their vehicles and view the local area map.

Concourse level
Ticketing office or Ticket Vending Machines (TVMs) is located here. Retail outlets and other facilities like washrooms, ATMs, first aid, etc., are available in this area.

Platform level
This layer consists of two platforms. Trains takes passengers from this level.

G	Street level	Exit/Entrance
L1	Mezzanine	Fare control, station agent, Metro Card vending machines, crossover
L2	Side platform | Doors will open on the left
L2	Platform 1 Southbound	Towards → Vasavi LB Nagar next station is Khairatabad
L2	Platform 2 Northbound	Towards ← Miyapur next station is Punjagutta
L2	Side platform | Doors will open on the left
L2

== Facilities ==
The station has a skywalk which leads to the Next Galleria Mall.
