= Khairatabad railway station =

Railway station in Hyderabad, India

Coordinates: 17.4132°N 78.4610°E

Khairatabad
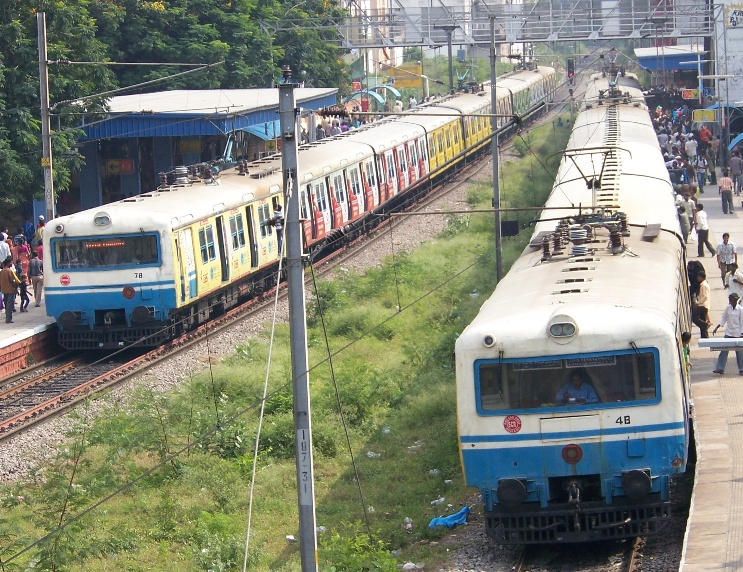
- MMTS trains at Khairatabad railway station

General information
- Location: Hyderabad, Telangana; India
- Elevation: 521 metres (1,709 ft)
- System: Indian Railways and Hyderabad MMTS station
- Platforms: 2
- Connections: Red Line Khairatabad

Other information
- Station code: KQD
- Zone(s): South Central Railway zone
- Division(s): Secunderabad Division
Location
- Location within Hyderabad

Khairatabad railway station is located in Hyderabad, Telangana, India. Localities like Somajiguda, Saifabad and Banjara Hills are accessible from this station.

== Lines ==
- Multi-Modal Transport System, Hyderabad
  - Secunderabad–Falaknuma route (FS Line)
