= Lakeview Guest House =

- Interactive map of the Lakeview Guest House area

General information
- Type: Royal residence
- Location: Hyderabad, India

Lakeview Guest House is an official residence of the Telangana Government. It was built in 2005. It was official residence of Andhra Pradesh Chief minister till 2009. It is located on Raj Bhavan Road.
