= Nizamia observatory =

Japal-Rangapur Nizamia Observatory
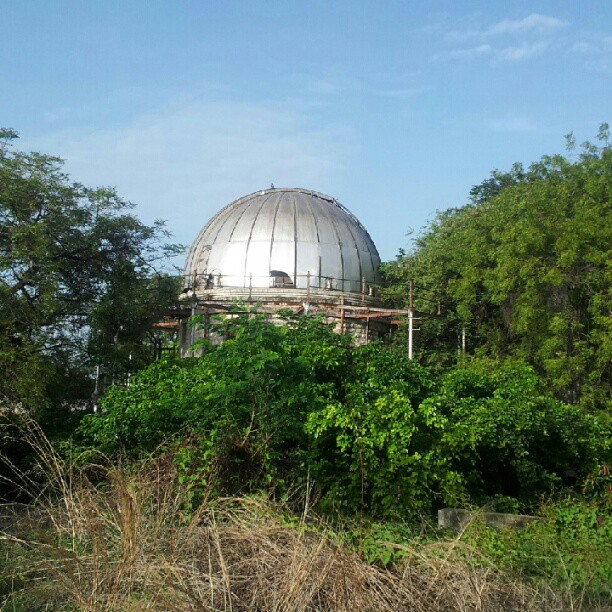
- Nizamia Observatory
- Alternative names: Hyderabad observatory
- Named after: Nizam of Hyderabad
- Organization: Osmania University
- Observatory code: 218
- Location: Punjagutta
- Coordinates: 17°25′54″N 78°27′9″E
- Established: 1908

Telescopes
- 15" Grubb: refractor telescope
- 8" Cooke: astrograph
- 48" telescope: reflector telescope
- Related media on Commons

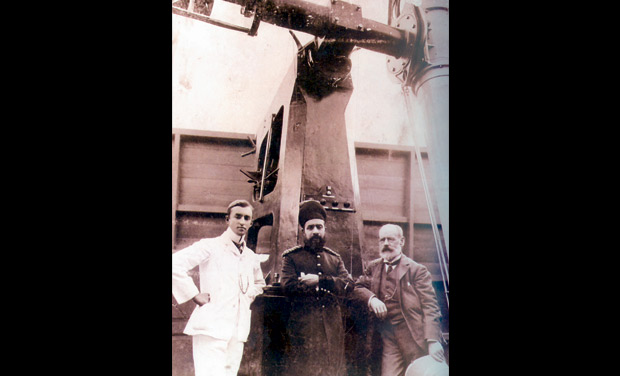
Nawab Zafar Jung with astronomy experts at the Nizamia Observatory

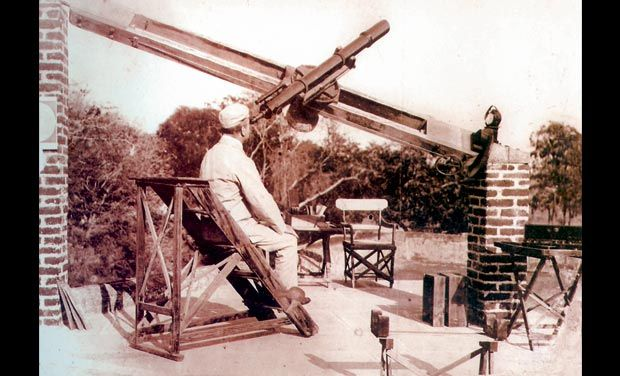
Colonel R E Fox looking through the telescope

Nizamia observatory is an optical observatory built by Nawab Zafar Jung Bahadur of the House of Paigah and Amir of the Khurshid Jahi estate and established by Mahbub Ali Khan, Asaf Jah VI - the 6th Nizam of Kingdom of Hyderabad in 1901. It participated in the Carte du Ciel making 463,542 observations. It boasted of an 8" Cooke Astrograph and a 15" Grubb refractor telescope.

== History ==
It was founded by Nawab Zafar Yar Jung Bahadur, a rich Nobleman from the Paigah Nobility and an astronomer and the Amir of the Khursheed Jahi Paigah in Hyderabad in 1908 when he bought a 6-inch telescope from England. He installed it in Phisal Banda Palace, Hyderabad (now Deccan Medical College and Owaisi Hospital). He requested that it be called Nizamiah Observatory after the sixth Nizam of Hyderabad, Mir Mahboob Ali Khan. Bahadur died in 1907 and requested that Nizam's Government take over the Observatory. In accordance with his wishes, the administration of the Observatory was taken over by the Finance Department of the Nizam Government in 1908.

In the mid-1950s owing to the expansion of Hyderabad city and light pollution, a new site was scouted for the Observatory. Dr. K D Abhayankar selected the current 200 acre site at Rangapur village. The new observatory was called the Japal-Rangapur Nizamia Observatory. It became operational in 1968–69. It was subsequently used to observe the 1980 solar eclipse and the comets, Halley and Shoemaker-Levy.

Arthur B Chatwood (1866-1915) was Director of Nizamia Observatory between 1908 and 1914. He moved the location of the Observatory from Pisal Banda to Begumpet. During his time, the 8" Cooke Astrograph was installed. He started work on the astrograph catalog. This work was continued by Robert J Pocock (1889-1918) who was Director of the Observatory between 1914 and 1918. He also studied Nova Aquilae, sunspots, and the relation between elements of planets and satellites. On the death of Pocock, his assistant, T P Bhaskaran (1889-1950) took over in 1918. He had to wait till 1922 to be officially appointed and continued till 1944. He was the first person of Indian origin to become a Director of an Observatory. During his time, control of the Observatory moved from the finance department in the Nizam government to Osmania University. The 15" Grubb refractor telescope was installed in 1922 under Bhaskaran's supervision. He started the program of observation of variable stars using this telescope. M K Vainu Bappu made variable star observations from here in the 1940s and 1950s. A spectrohelioscope and a blink comparator were added in the mid-1940s. It participated in Carte du Ciel between 1908 and 1944, an international astronomy observation program. It was assigned the coordinates from 17 to 23 degrees South between 1914 and 1929. It was assigned coordinates 36 to 39 degrees North between 1928 and 1938.

Akbar Ali became Director of the Observatory in 1944 and worked till 1960. He installed the 48" telescope at the Observatory. Under his directorship, the study of photoelectric photometry was introduced and the study of comets, variable stars, lunar occultation, solar activity, and study of motion of clusters was undertaken. It also participated in the solar and seismological observations as part of the International Geophysical Year (1957–58).

A K Das was Director of the Observatory in 1960 for a very short time after his retirement as Director of Kodaikanal Observatory. However, his sudden death meant that K D Abhayankar was made acting Director between 1960 and 1963. Abhayankar moved the site of the observatory from Hyderabad to a tiny hillock between the villages of Japal and Rangapur, at a distance of 55 km from Hyderabad. R V Karandikar became director in 1963. The hillock was installed in 1964 and commissioned in December 1968. In 1964, the University Grants Commission recognised the astronomy department and the observation facilities as Nizamia and Japal-Rangapur as Center for Advanced Studies in Astronomy (CASA).

In order to observe the solar eclipse on February 16, 1980, CASA collaborated with Physical Research Laboratory and Space Applications Center in Ahmedabad to obtain a 10 feet steerable dish. This dish was used to make high-resolution microwave brightness temperature measurements. It is since being used to study solar flux.

== Telescopes ==
The Observatory has a 48-inch telescope, the second largest in Asia, after the 93-inch instrument at Vainu Bappu Observatory in Tamil Nadu, India. The telescope was mechanically operated. It was used to study comets, planetary atmosphere and near-Earth asteroids. The Observatory has two other 12-inch telescopes and one 10-foot radio telescope operating at 10 GHz.

== Current status ==
It currently lies unused on the premises of the Centre for Economic and Social Studies, Hyderabad, India. The observatory at Rangapur faces the same issue of light pollution and urbanisation of the locality and remains unused. There are currently proposals to convert the space into an engineering college.
