= Centre for Economic and Social Studies =

Indian research institute

Centre for Economic and Social Studies (CESS)
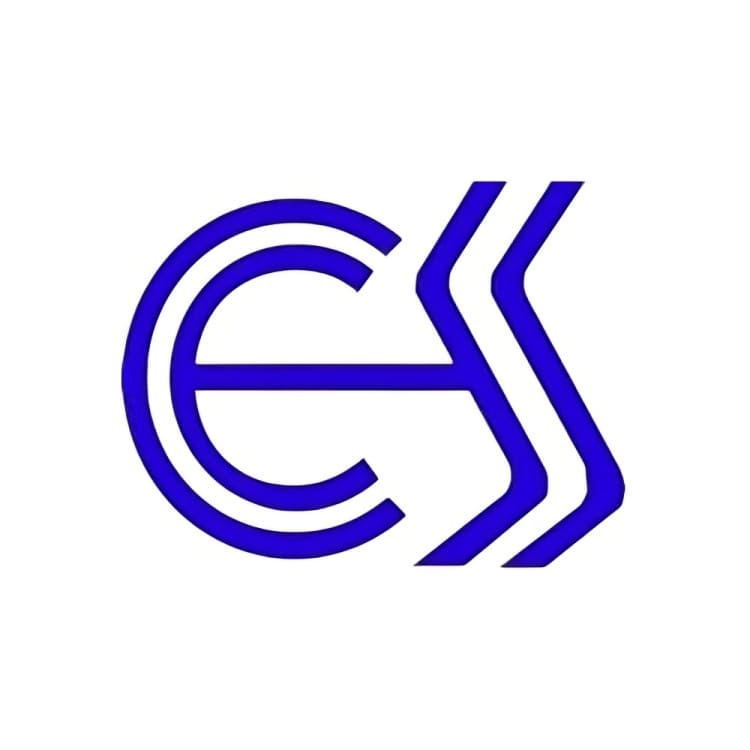
- Type: Institution for Advanced Research
- Established: 1980; 46 years ago
- Chairman: Dilip M. Nachane
- Director: E. Revathi
- Students: ~100
- Location: Hyderabad, Telangana, India
- Campus: Urban
- Website: https://cess.ac.in/

The Centre for Economic and Social Studies (CESS) is an Indian autonomous research institute, established in 1980 to facilitate research activity in Economics and Social Sciences. It is one of the twenty-four 'Research institutions of all-India character' recognised by the Indian Council of Social Science Research. It was a brainchild of B. P. R. Vithal, IAS (Retd)., a former Principal Secretary to the Finance and Planning Department of Government of Andhra Pradesh. The campus is situated at Begumpet, in Hyderabad.

The centre celebrated its silver jubilee in 2006 with special silver jubilee seminar inaugurated by the then Prime Minister, Dr. Manmohan Singh. One of its founder members, Prof. C. H. Hanumantha Rao was nominated to the National Advisory Council (NAC) in 2005.

== Activities ==
=== Research ===
This institute conducts research in the fields of rural development and poverty, agriculture and food security, irrigation and water management, public finance, demographics, health, and the environment. It also undertakes research projects sponsored by the State and Central governments, as well as international agencies like World Bank, Department For International Development (DFID), Ford Foundation, European Community, Rockefeller Foundation and Asian Development Bank. Conducting interdisciplinary research in analytical and applied areas of social sciences, encompassing socio-economic and other aspects of development, constitutes the predominant activities of the centre.

=== Academic ===
The Centre (CESS) offers a full-time PhD Programme in Development Studies in collaboration with Telangana University in the following disciplines/subjects:

1. Economics
2. Sociology/Anthropology/Social Work
3. Geography
4. Public Administration/Political Science
5. Statistics (with specialisation in Econometrics)
6. Commerce & Business Management

The M.Phil Programme was started in 1986, and the Ph.D. programme was started in 1991. The institute also offers a part-time doctoral programme that enables the faculty of colleges, research organisations, NGOs, etc., to undertake research in areas of interest without taking a long leave from their regular jobs. The policy guidance for this Programme is framed by a Research Programme Committee (RPC) comprising subject experts from several academic institutes in Hyderabad. As of 2022, 78 candidates have been awarded Ph.D Degrees and M.Phil Degrees have been awarded to 101 candidates.

== Other facilities ==
The Centre is equipped with advanced computer system and networking facilities and Video Conferencing Equipment. The Cartography Cell attached to the Centre, completed several cartographic studies, viz. "Spatial Framework for Planning and Development Administration", "Godavari Valley Development Plan", "Shore Area Perspective Plan", "Medak District Planning Atlas", "Tribal Development Atlas of Andhra Pradesh", "Geo-thermal Atlas of Rajasthan", "Geo-tectonic Map of India", etc. The Centre has four conference halls with excellent acoustic and projection facilities which can be used for official meetings and seminars where parallel sessions can be conducted. The new Auditorium was Inaugurated by the Hon'ble Prime Minister of India Dr. Manmohan Singh in January, 2006.

The premises also houses the Nizamia observatory operated by the Osmania University.

== Governance ==
The centre is governed by a Board of Governors consisting of eminent Professors in Economics, Scholars and personalities, besides Principal Secretaries to Government of Telangana, Finance and Planning Departments and representative(s) of Indian Council of Social Science Research.

== Funding ==
The Institute gets grant in aid from the Government of Andhra Pradesh and The Indian Council of Social Science Research (ICSSR) (Ministry of Human Resource Development, Government of India. Besides, it generates funds for the Projects that are assigned by various institutions and agencies.

== Publications ==
- Political Economy of Watershed Management, by V. Ratna Reddy M. Gopinath Reddy and John Soussan (2010).
- Biotechnology in Indian Agriculture: Potential, Performance and Concerns, by N. Chandrasekhara Rao, S. Mahendra Dev (2010) .
- Water Security and Management: Ecological Imperative and Policy Options, by V. Ratna ReddyBold text (2009).
- India Perspectives on Equitable Development, by S. Mahendra Dev and N. Chandrasekhara Rao (2009).
- Human Development in Andhra Pradesh: Experiences – Issues and Challenges, by S. Mahendra Dev, C. Ravi and M. Venkatnarayana(2009).
- High-Tech Urban Spaces: Asian and European Perspective, by Ramachandraiah C, Guus Westen and Sheela Prasad (2008).
- India: Some Aspects of Economic and Social Development, by S. Mahendra Dev and K.S. Babu (2008).
- India’s Development: Social and Economic Disparities, by S. Mahendra Dev and K.S. Babu (2008).
- Inclusive Growth in India: Agriculture, Poverty and Human Development, by S. Mahendra Dev (2007).
- Managing Water Resources: Politics, Institutions and Technologies, by V. Ratna Reddy and S. Mahendra Dev (2006).
- Towards a Food Secure India: Issues and Policies, by S. Mahendra Dev, K. P. Kannan and Mira Ramachandran (2003).
- Andhra Pradesh Development: Economic Reforms and Challenges Ahead, by Ch. Hanumantha Rao and S. Mahendra Dev (2003).
- The Gadgil Formula: For Allocation of Central Assistance for State Plans, by B.P.R. Vithal, and M.L.Sastry(2002).

== Recognition ==
Its activities are expanded beyond the state of Andhra Pradesh and cover other areas of the country. The Centre is recognized as an institute for advanced research in social sciences by the University of Hyderabad and Osmania University. The Indian Council of Social Science Research (ICSSR) (Ministry of Human Resource Development, Government of India), in appreciation of its role in promotion of research and training, recognized this centre as a national institute in the year 1986 and included the Centre in its network of institutions.
