= Lakdi-ka-pul metro station =

Metro station in Hyderabad, India

NMDC Lakdi-ka-pul
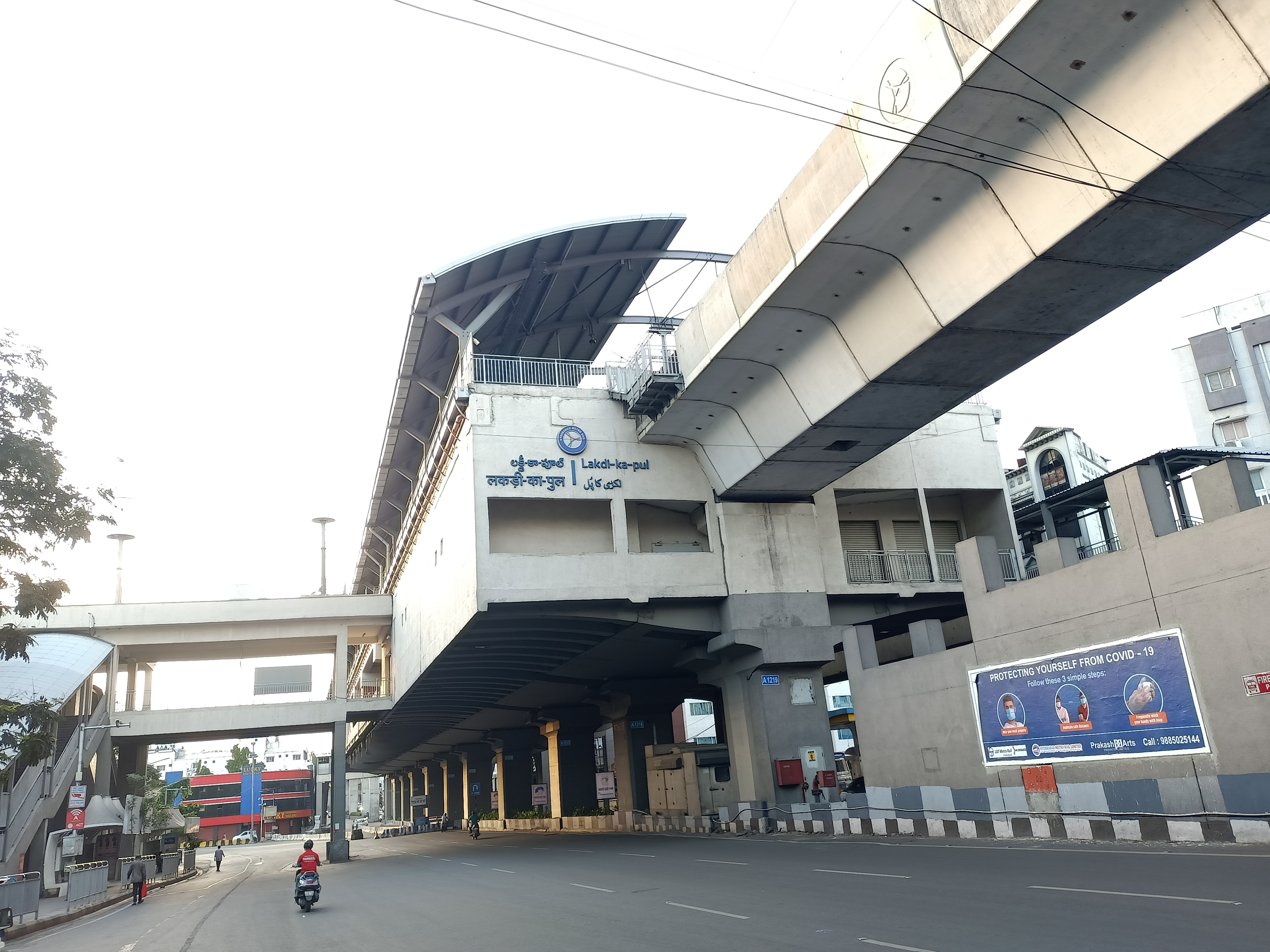

General information
- Location: Nh65, Ambedkar Colony, Lakdi ka pul, Hyderabad, Telangana 500004
- Coordinates: 17.4038078°N 78.4646968°E
- System: Hyderabad Metro station
- Line: Red Line
- Platforms: Side platform Platform-1 → Vasavi LB Nagar; Platform-2 →Miyapur
- Tracks: 2
- Connections: Lakdikapul

Construction
- Structure type: Elevated, Double-track
- Platform levels: 2
- Parking: Available
- Cycle facilities: Available
- Accessible: Disabled access

Other information
- Status: Staffed, Operational

History
- Opened: 24 September 2018; 7 years ago
- Electrified: 25 kV 50 Hz AC through overhead catenary

Services
Preceding station	Hyderabad Metro	Following station
Khairatabad towards Miyapur	Red Line	Assembly towards LB Nagar
Location
- Location within Hyderabad Location within Telangana Location within India

Lakdi-ka-pul (also known as NMDC Lakdi-ka-pul) is a metro station on the Red Line of the Hyderabad Metro in India. This station was opened to public on 2017. It is located at Lakdi ka pul near to Lakdikapul railway station, Ravindra Bharathi, HP Petrol pump, Telephone Bhavan, Collector's Office, CID Office and Global Hospitals.

== History ==
It was opened on 24 September 2018. In July 2023, NMDC became the sponsor of the Lakdi-ka-pul metro station, under semi-naming policy of Hyderabad metro to generate non-fare revenues.

== The station ==
=== Structure ===
Lakdi-ka-pul elevated metro station situated on the Red Line of Hyderabad Metro.

=== Facilities ===
The stations have staircases, elevators and escalators from the street level to the platform level which provide easy and comfortable access. Also, operation panels inside the elevators are installed at a level that can be conveniently operated by all passengers, including disabled and elderly citizens.

=== Station layout ===
Street Level
This is the first level where passengers may park their vehicles and view the local area map.

Concourse level
Ticketing office or Ticket Vending Machines (TVMs) is located here. Retail outlets and other facilities like washrooms, ATMs, first aid, etc., will be available in this area.

Platform level
This layer consists of two platforms. Trains takes passengers from this level.

G	Street level	Exit/Entrance
L1	Mezzanine	Fare control, station agent, Metro Card vending machines, crossover
L2	Side platform | Doors will open on the left
L2	Platform 1 Southbound	Towards → Vasavi LB Nagar next station is Assembly
L2	Platform 2 Northbound	Towards ← Miyapur next station is Khairatabad
L2	Side platform | Doors will open on the left
L2

== Entry/exit ==
Lakdi-ka-pul station Entry/exits
Gate No-A	Gate No-B	Gate No-C	Gate No-D

== See also ==
- Lakdikapul railway station
- Transport in Hyderabad
