= Lakdikapul railway station =

Railway station in Hyderabad, India

Coordinates: 17.4038°N 78.4633°E

Lakdikapul
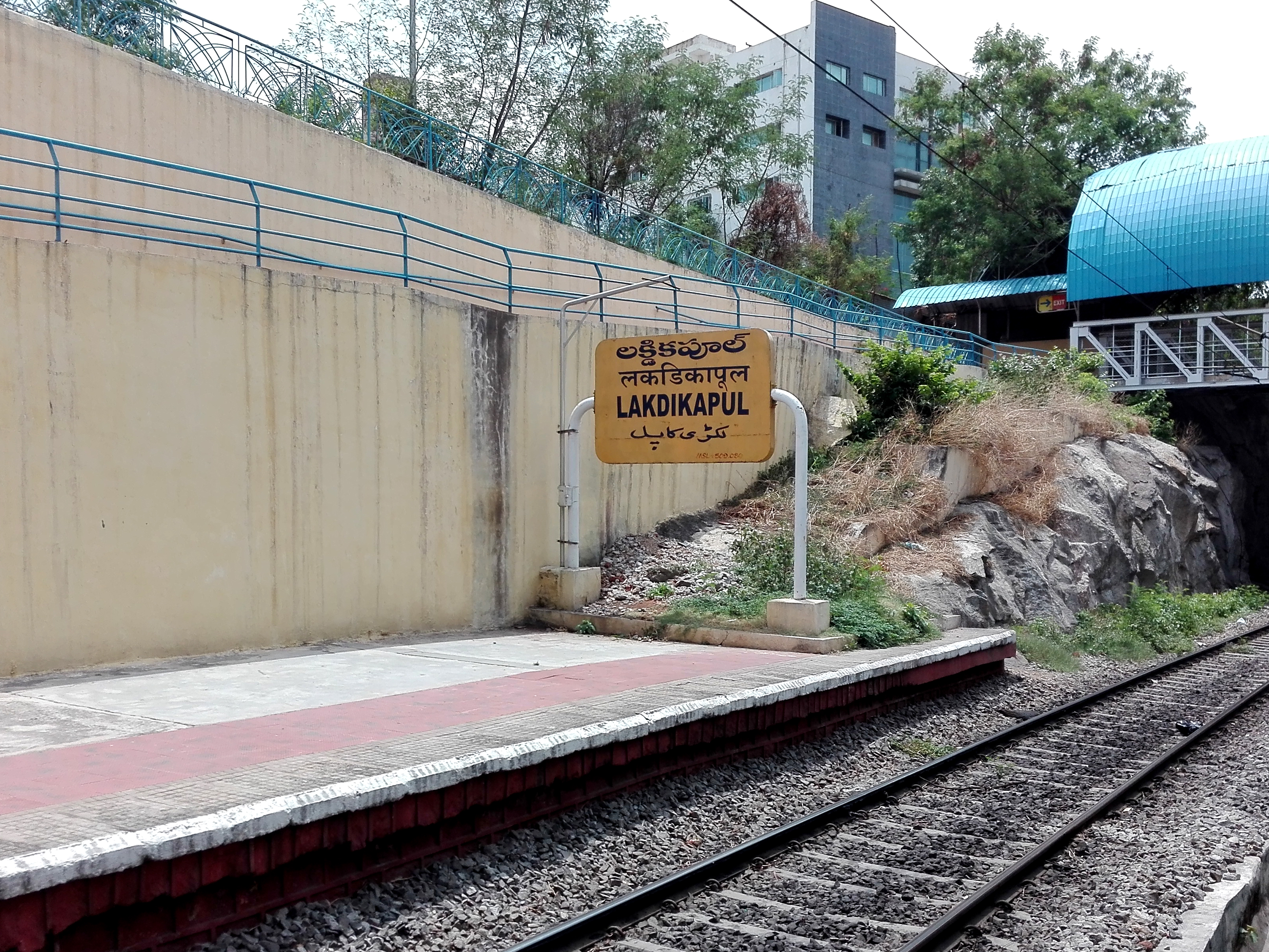
- name board of Lakdikapul MMTS station

General information
- Location: Hyderabad, Telangana; India
- Elevation: 523 metres (1,716 ft)
- System: Indian Railways and Hyderabad MMTS station
- Platforms: 2
- Connections: Red Line Lakdi-ka-pul

Other information
- Station code: LKPL
- Zone(s): South Central Railway zone
- Division(s): Secunderabad Division
Location
- Location within Hyderabad Location within Telangana Location within India

Lakdikapul railway station is a railway station located in Hyderabad, Telangana, India. Localities like Red Hills, Public Gardens and Masab Tank are accessible from this station.

The overbridge (pul in Urdu) constructed with wood (lakdi in Urdu) at the station, for pedestrians is historic. Hence, the area became famous as Lakdi ka pul.

== Lines ==
- Hyderabad Multi-Modal Transport System
  - Secunderabad–Falaknuma route (SF Line)
