= Ameerpet =

Ameerpet, Hyderabad Ameerpet
- Neighbourhood
- Ameerpeta
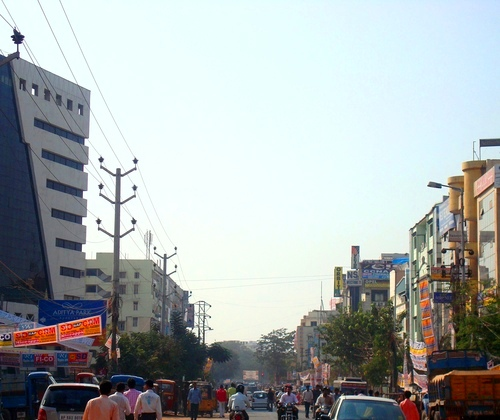
- IT training centres at Ameerpet, Hyderabad, India

- Location in Hyderabad, India Ameerpet, Hyderabad (Telangana) Ameerpet, Hyderabad (India)
- Coordinates: 17°26′5.29″N 78°26′52.84″E
- Country: India
- State: Telangana
- District: Hyderabad District
- Metro: Hyderabad Metropolitan Region
- Founded: 1900
- Founded by: Aamir Ali

Government
  - Body: GHMC

Languages
  - Official: Telugu
- Time zone: UTC+5:30 (IST)
- PIN: 500016
- Parliament constituencies: Secunderabad
- Sasana Sabha constituencies: Sanathnagar
- Planning agency: HUDA
- Civic agency: GHMC

Ameerpet is a residential hub located in the north-west part of Hyderabad, Telangana. Ameerpet is also a Mandal in Hyderabad District. The locality borders Sardar Patel Road and National Highway 65. Though consisting of vacant plots till a few years back, the area is now bustling with commercial and residential establishments.

Popular areas located close to Ameerpet include Panjagutta, Begumpet, Sanath Nagar and Somajiguda.

Until the early 1990s, the area mostly consisted of vacant plots, Jagirdar lands, Nawabs houses, estates and roadside restaurants to serve the traffic along NH9 to Bombay. Commercial activity first shifted here from the center of the city in the 1990s with the expansion of the northern suburbs of Hyderabad due to ongoing construction activity in the area and its surrounding areas. Today it is a bustling locality with several commercial establishments along with high pedestrian and vehicular traffic.

== History ==
The land was gifted by then 6th Nizam of Hyderabad (Mahbub Ali Khan, Asaf Jah VI) to one of his Jagirdars named Amir Ali in the early 1900s. He built a small palace as his summer home and used the area as a summer resort since it was densely vegetated and had a pleasant climate and also water bodies. This palace now houses the "Nature Cure Hospital".

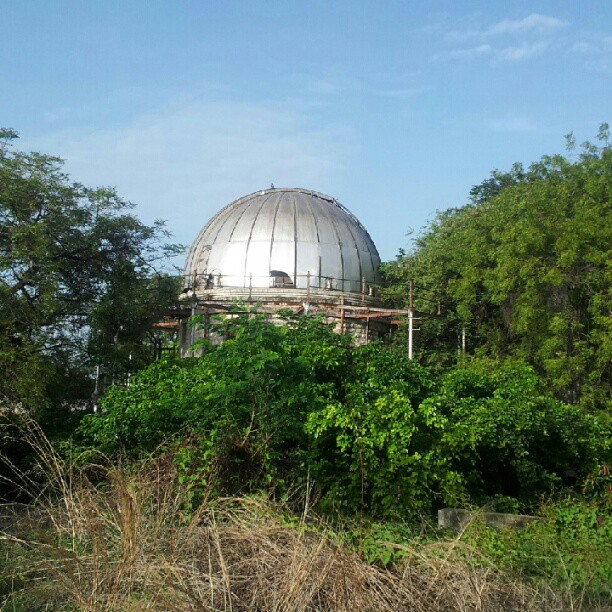
Nizamia Observatory Ameerpet, Punjagutta, Hyderabad

The third observatory of India called the "Nizamia Observatory" was set up here in Ameerpet by the Nizams. In 1908, Nawab Zafar Jung studied astronomy in England and he returned to Hyderabad along with two telescopes and an expert, whom he promised a net salary of 1500 osmania sikkas per month. He offered the telescopes to the Nizam, who ordered the installation of the telescopes at Ameerpet, where they remained for the next 50 years. The whole work of the ‘Carte due Cite’ Hyderabad Section was completed under the direction of T.P. Huascaran, who had published the remaining volumes of the astrographic catalog and this brought the work to a successful conclusion.

In 1923, the equatorial telescope by G. Rubb was erected and a Milne-Shaw seismograph was installed for the study of earthquakes and a second machine was added in 1929. A special underground chamber was constructed to house these delicate instruments. In 1928, at the request of the International Astronomical Union, the section of the sky originally allotted to the observatory at Potsdam (Germany) was undertaken by the Nizamia Observatory. The work of measurement and reduction was completed and three volumes were published by the International Astronomical Union. This observatory still stands here as a testimony to the development of Ameerpet.

The rest of the land of Ameerpet, after the merger of Hyderabad into the Indian Union, was later on passed on to his heirs who sold it in bits and pieces to other Jagirdars, nawabs, and other settlers. Most of these settlers were immigrants from neighbouring states Andhra Pradesh and also other states of India namely Rajasthan, UP, Maharashtra, Punjab, and Tamil Nadu. The substantial part of the land is still with Nawabs and Jagirdars. The value of land from the early 60s up to late 80s commanded higher prices than posher areas like Banjara Hills and Jubilee Hills because of its proximity to Highway and Industrial areas. Telugu actor Allu Arjun bought Satyam theatre and developed his own multiplex called AAA Cinemas at that place.

== Commerce ==
Ameerpet is known for its commerce and business of all kinds, but mainly as an education hub. It has several retail stores and many educational institutions like PAGE, TIME, PTE Academy, Ameerpet.org etc. which help students to get admission into institutes for pursuing higher studies.

=== Software training hub ===
Ameerpet is a well-known destination for software training in India. Students from different parts of the country come to Ameerpet to join software training courses. They avail of quality software training at relatively low prices. Online software training is also on offer. As a result, Ameerpet has a worldwide reputation and people from other countries also come here to get trained in various kinds of software. The Center for Development of Advanced Computing (C-DAC, Hyderabad) is located in Ameerpet.

== Transport ==
The Hyderabad Metro has Ameerpet metro station as a changeover station between Lines 1 and 3.

Buses run by TSRTC connect Ameerpet with all parts of the city.

The closest MMTS Train station is at Nature Cure hospital Railway Station and Begumpet Railway Station

== Major landmarks ==
Landmarks include Nizamia Observatory, Saradhi Studios, HUDA Maitrivanam, Huda Swarna Jayanti Complex, Aditya Enclave, Aditya Trade Centre, Aster Prime Hospital, Passport Seva Kendra, Ameerpet Gurudwara, Ameerpet IT Training Centre, Asian Satyam Mall (AAA Cinemas), Masjid-E-Akhtarunissa Begum, Vcare Multi Speciality Hospital, Elephant House, and Training and Consulting Services & VASAVI MPM GRAND

== Gallery ==
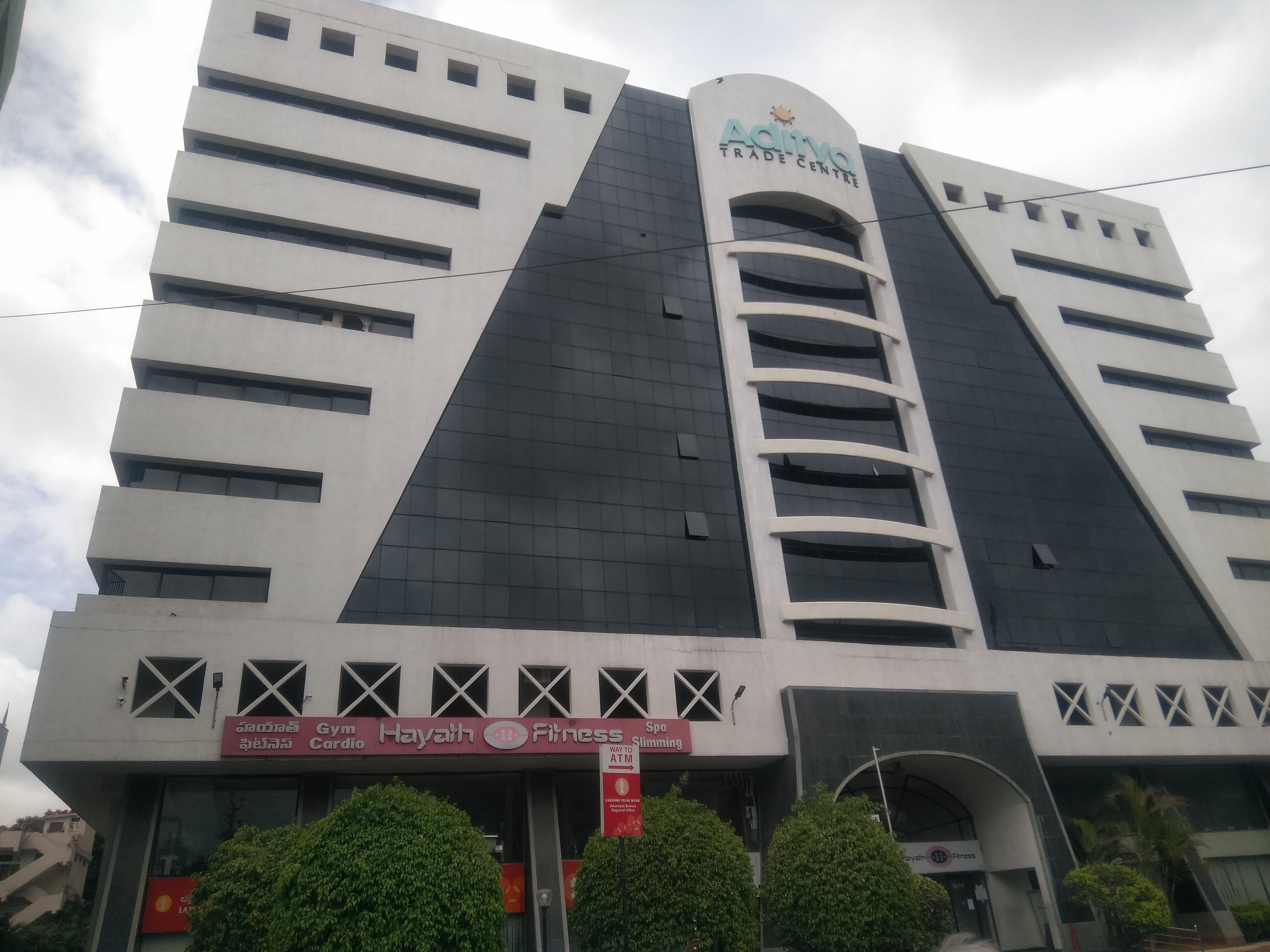
Adithya Trade centre

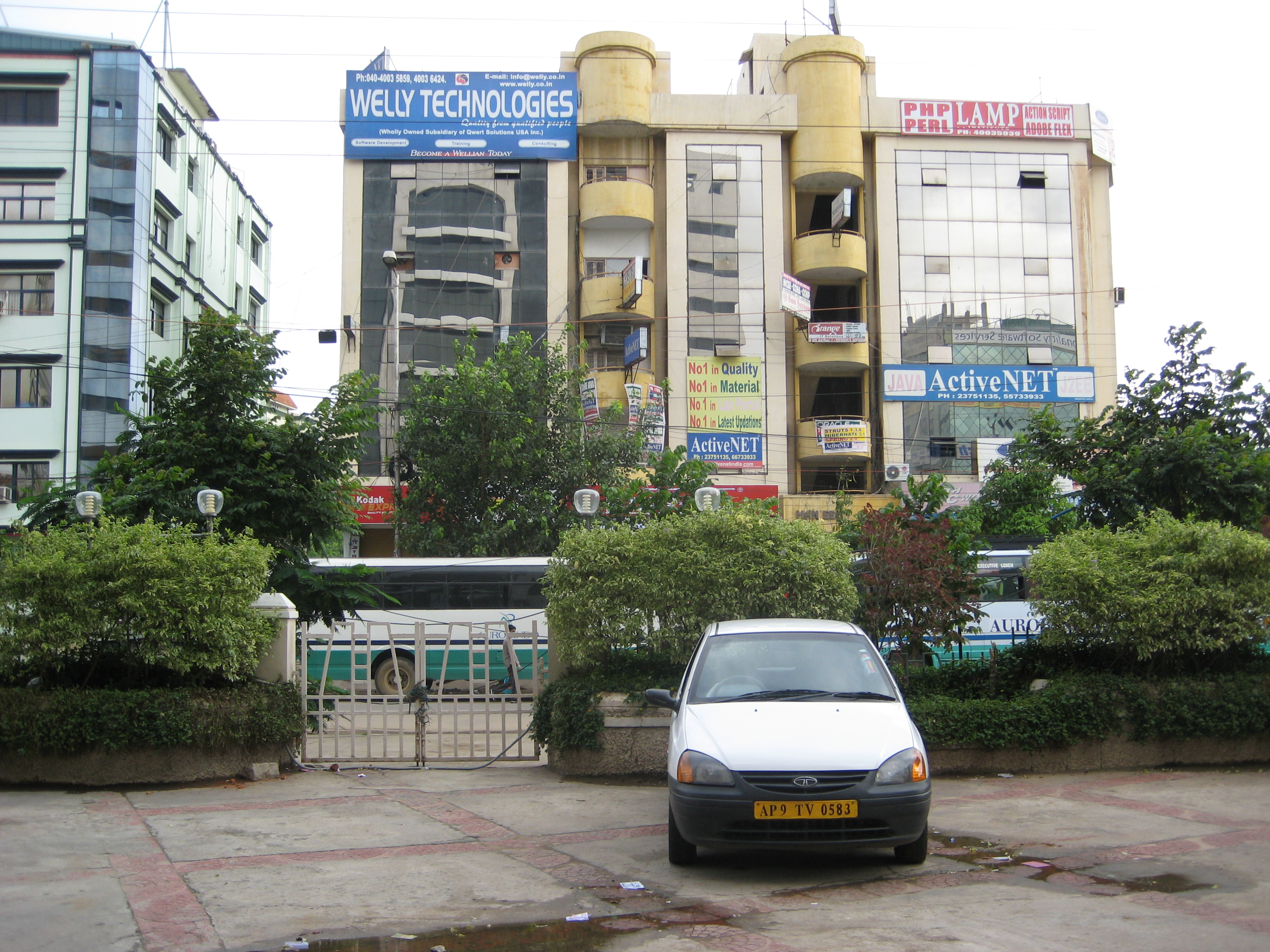
Ameerpet

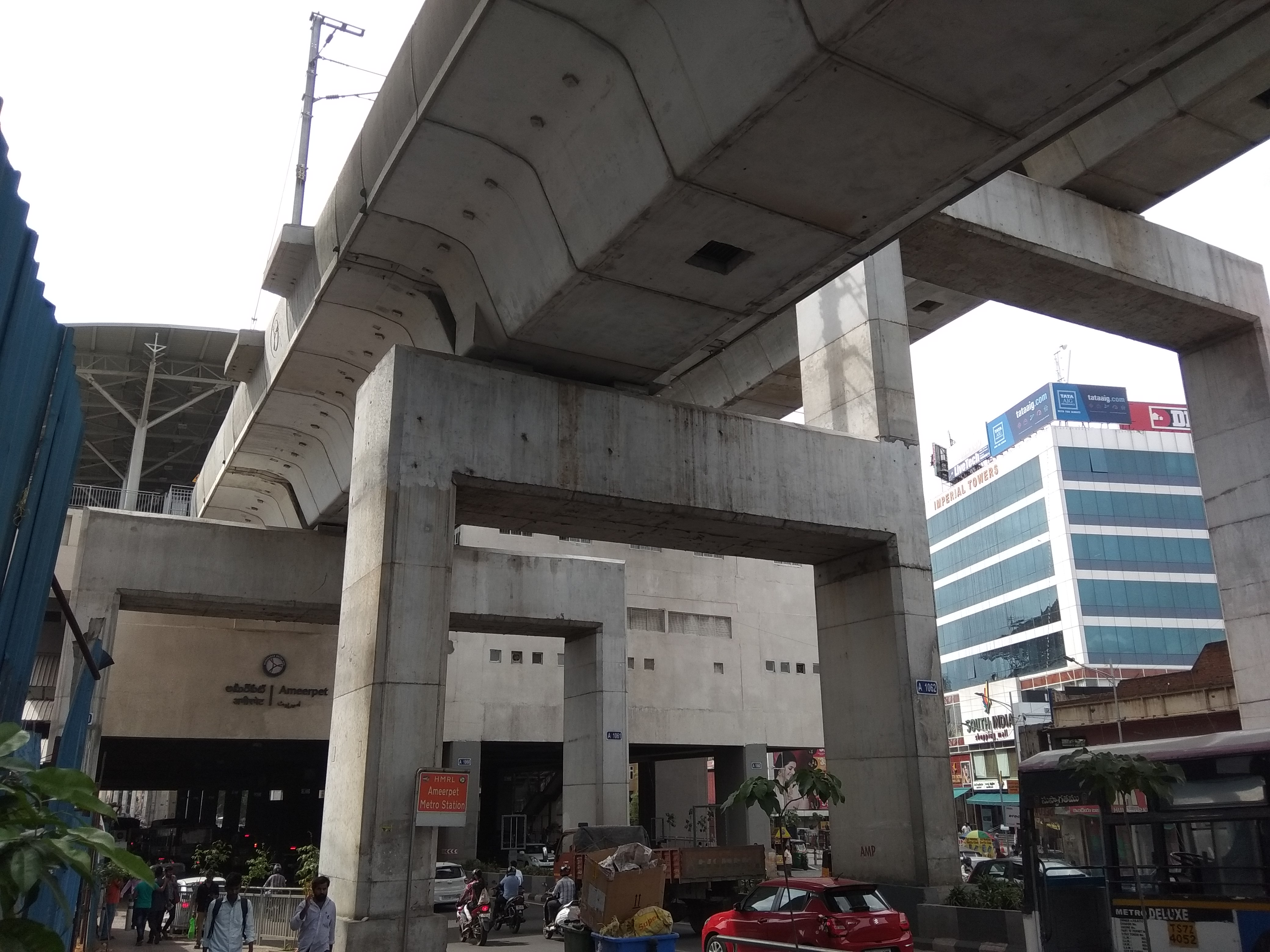
Ameerpet metro station.

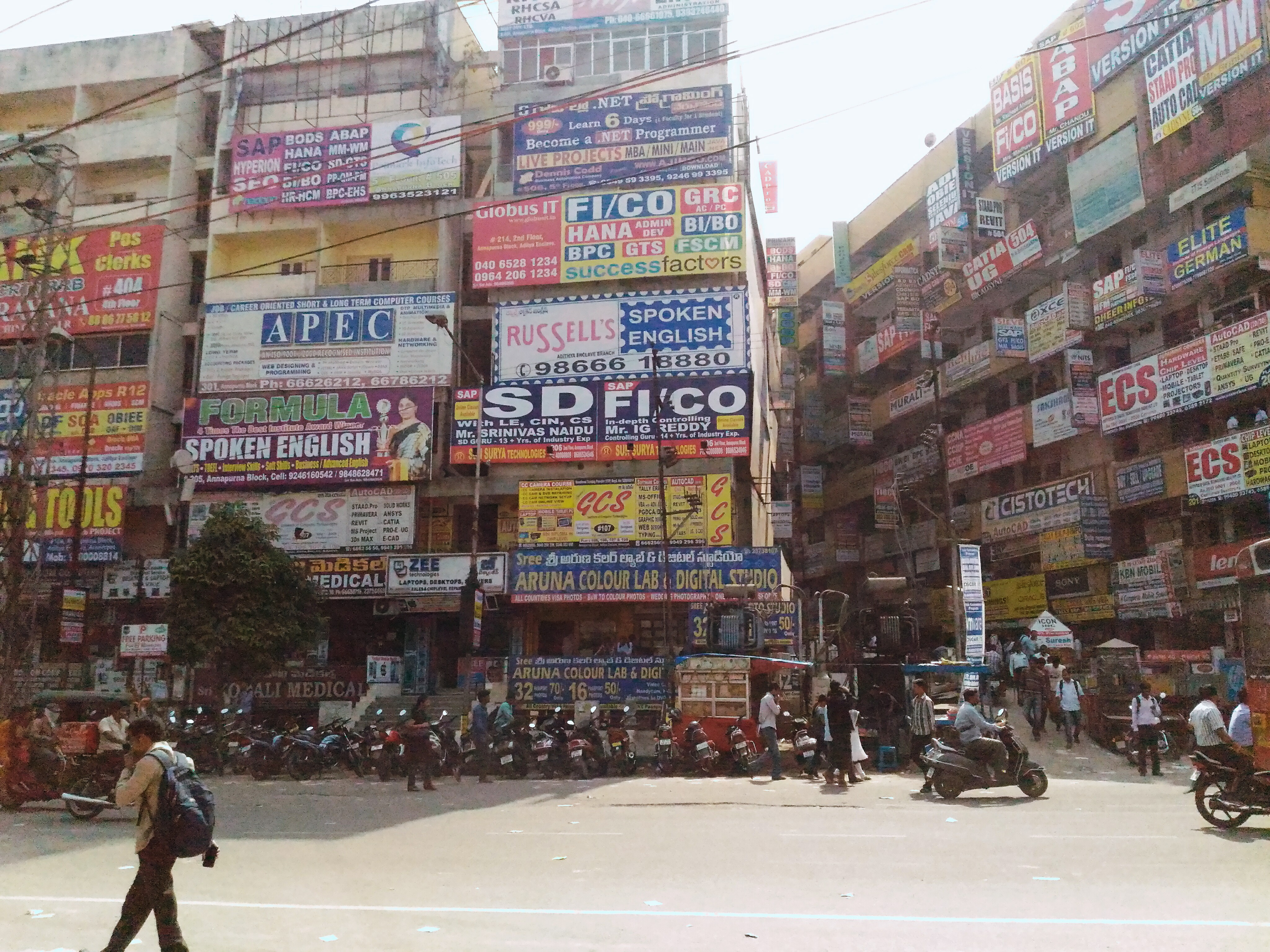
Aditya Enclave - Ameerpet

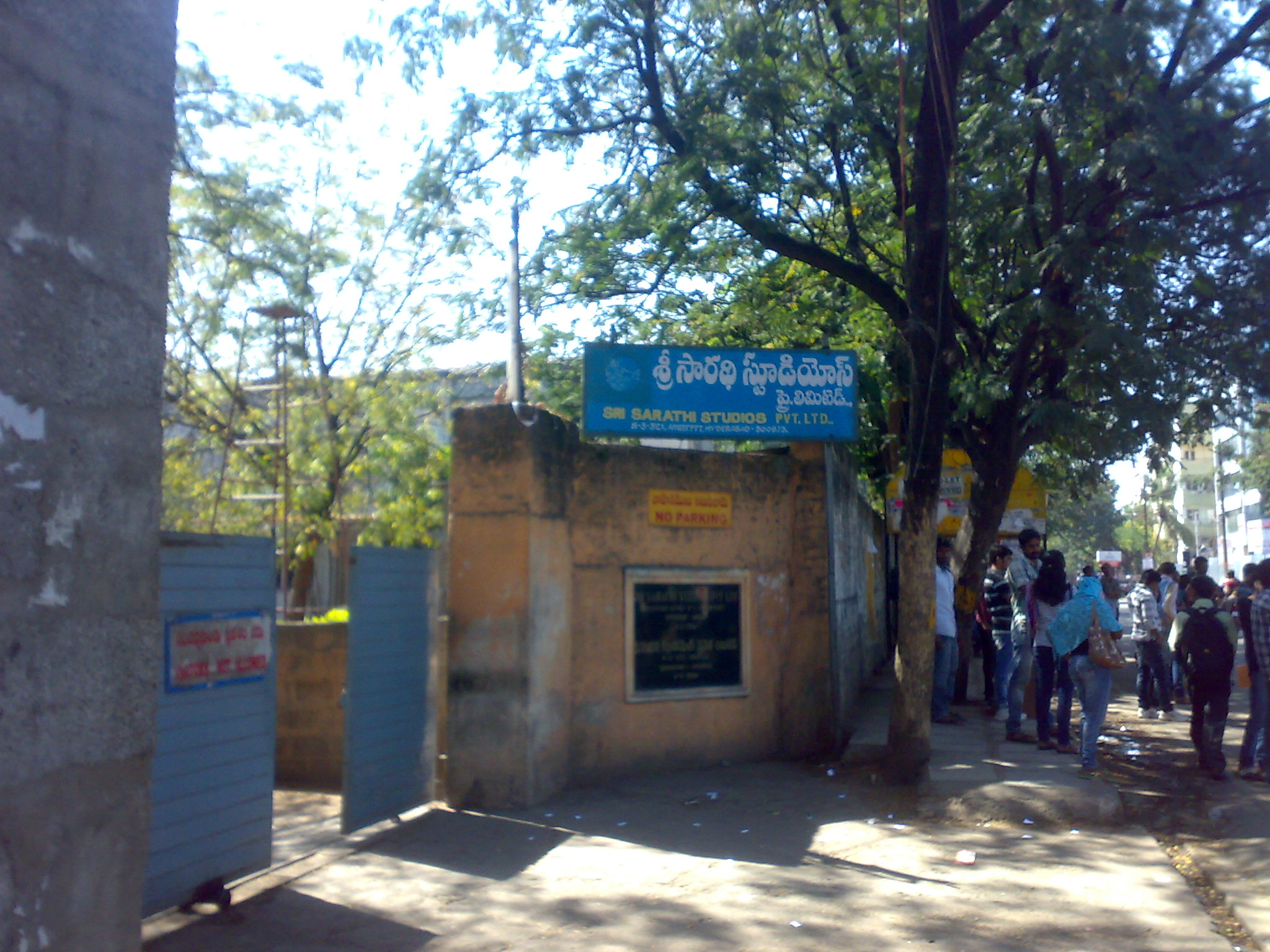
Sarathi Studios, Ameerpet

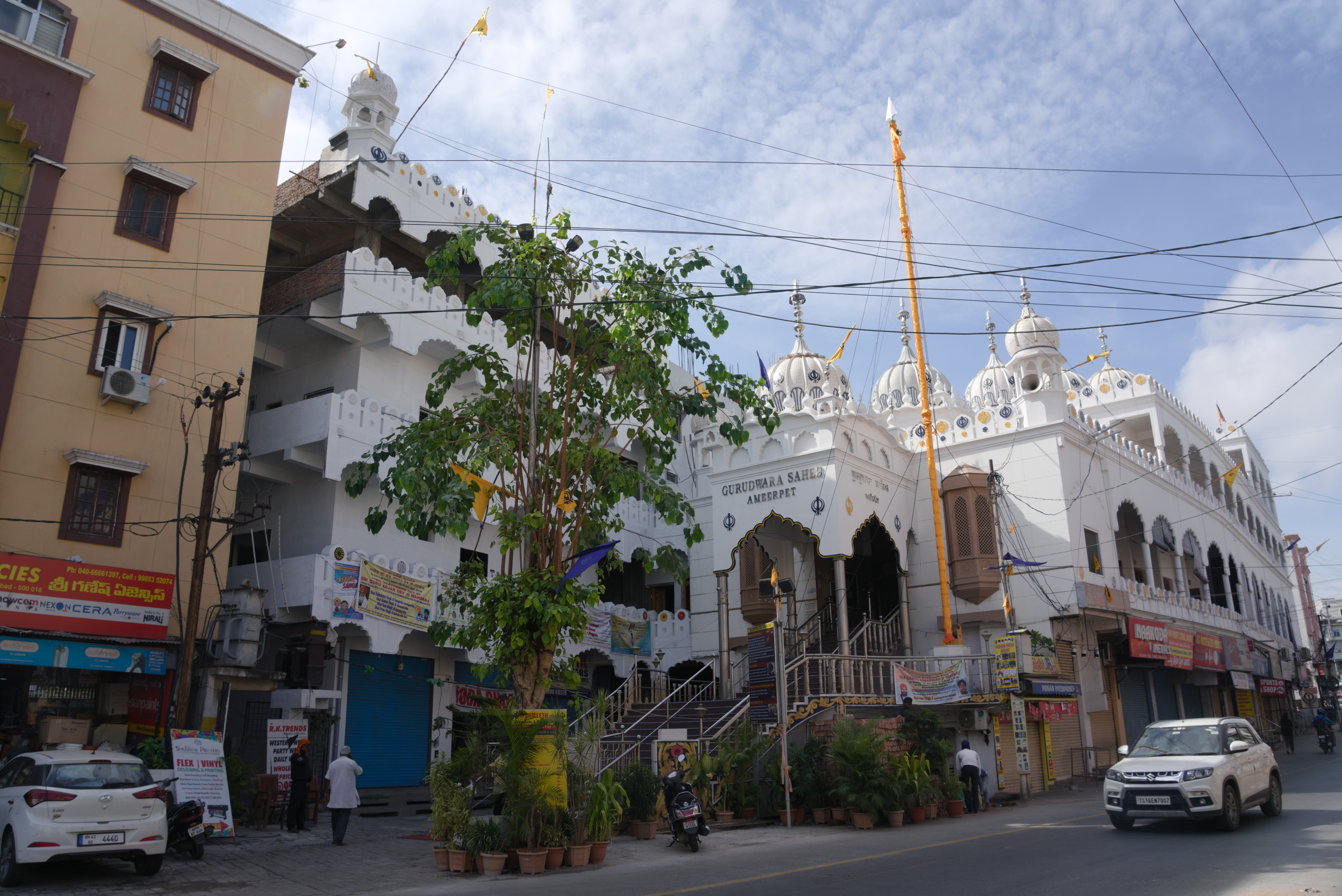
Gurdwara Sahib, Ameerpet, Hyderabad

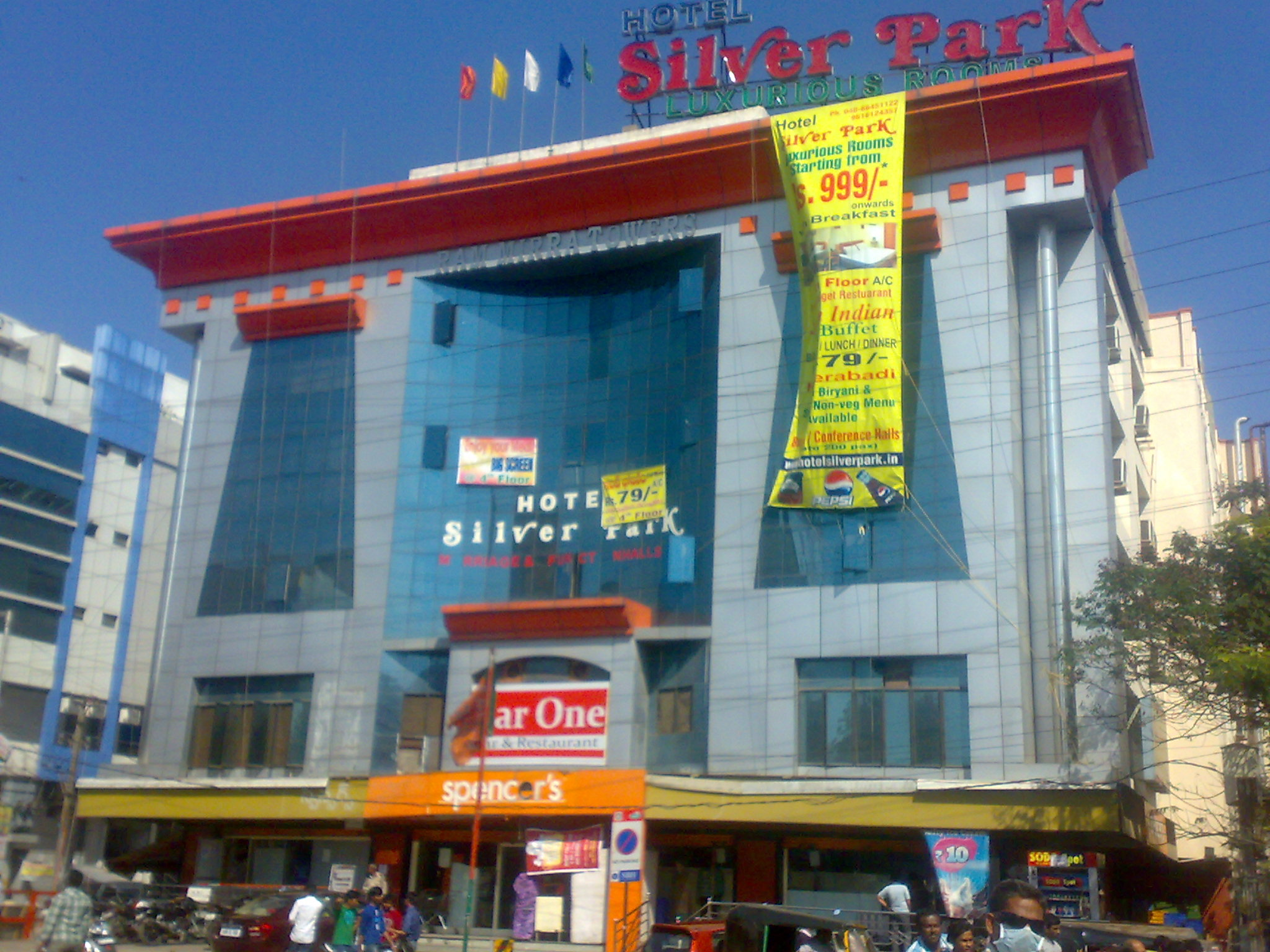
Hotel Silver park, ameerpet

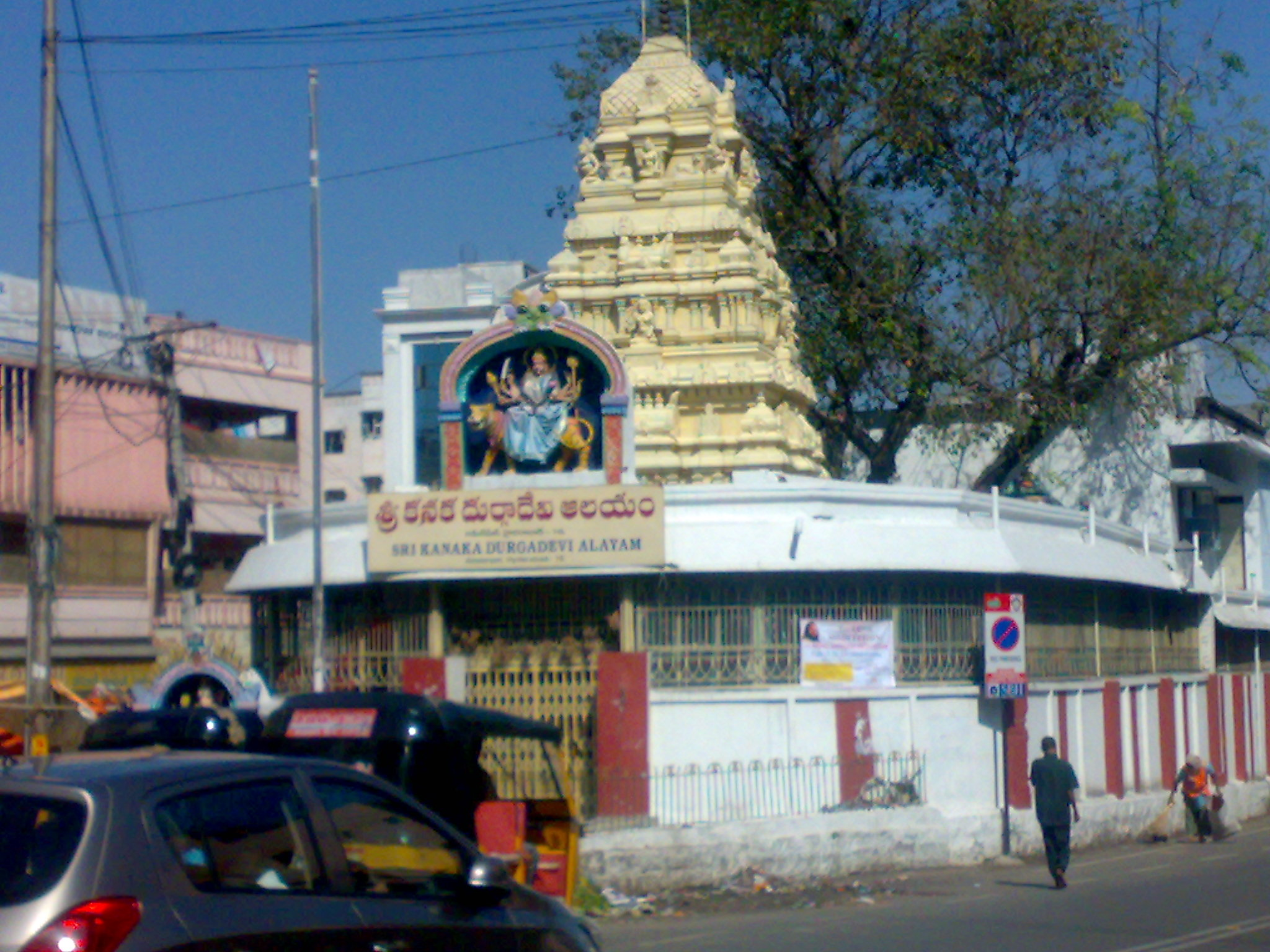
Sri Kanaka Durga Devi Alayam, Ameerpet

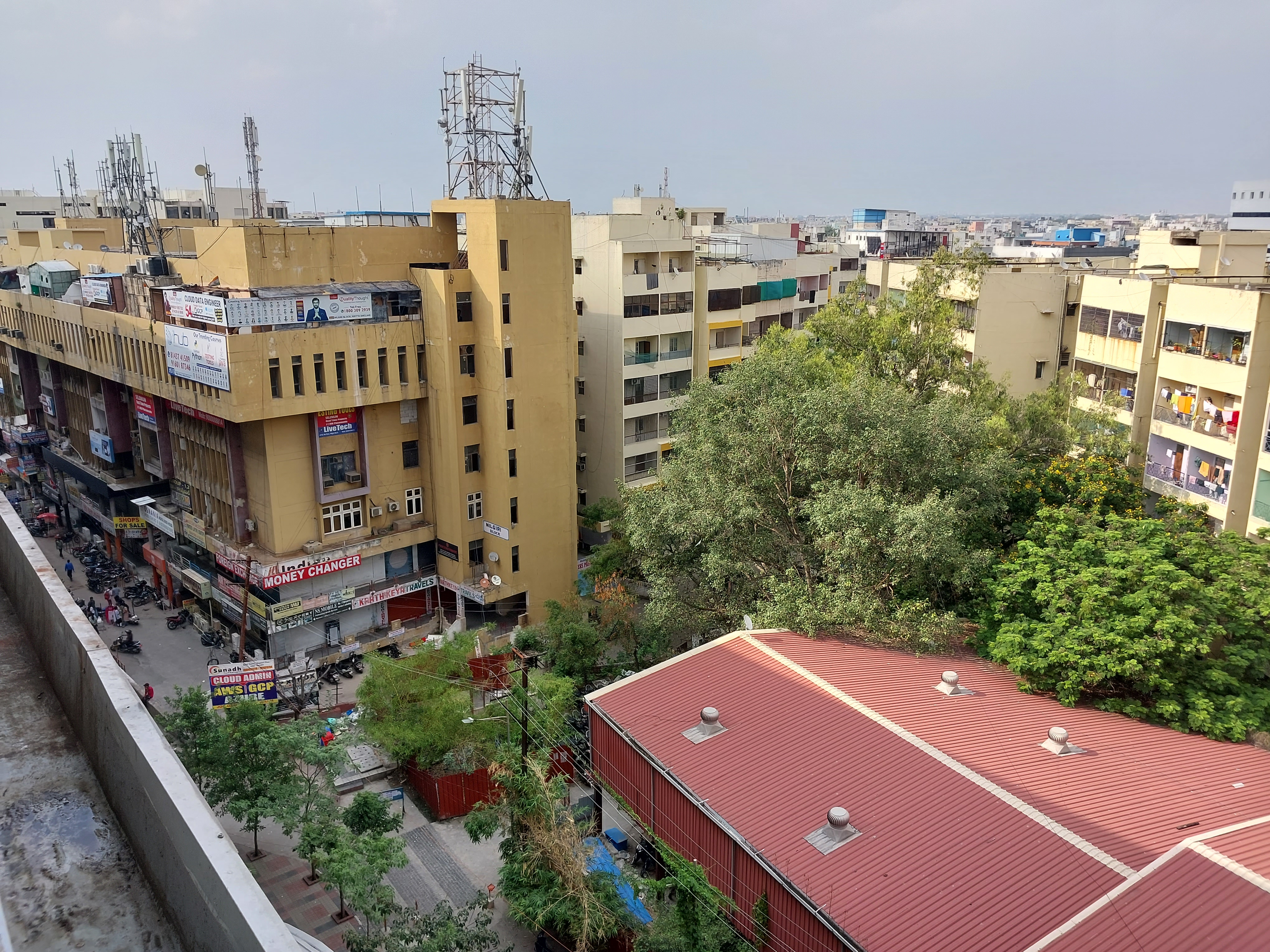
Ameerpet area of Hyderabad

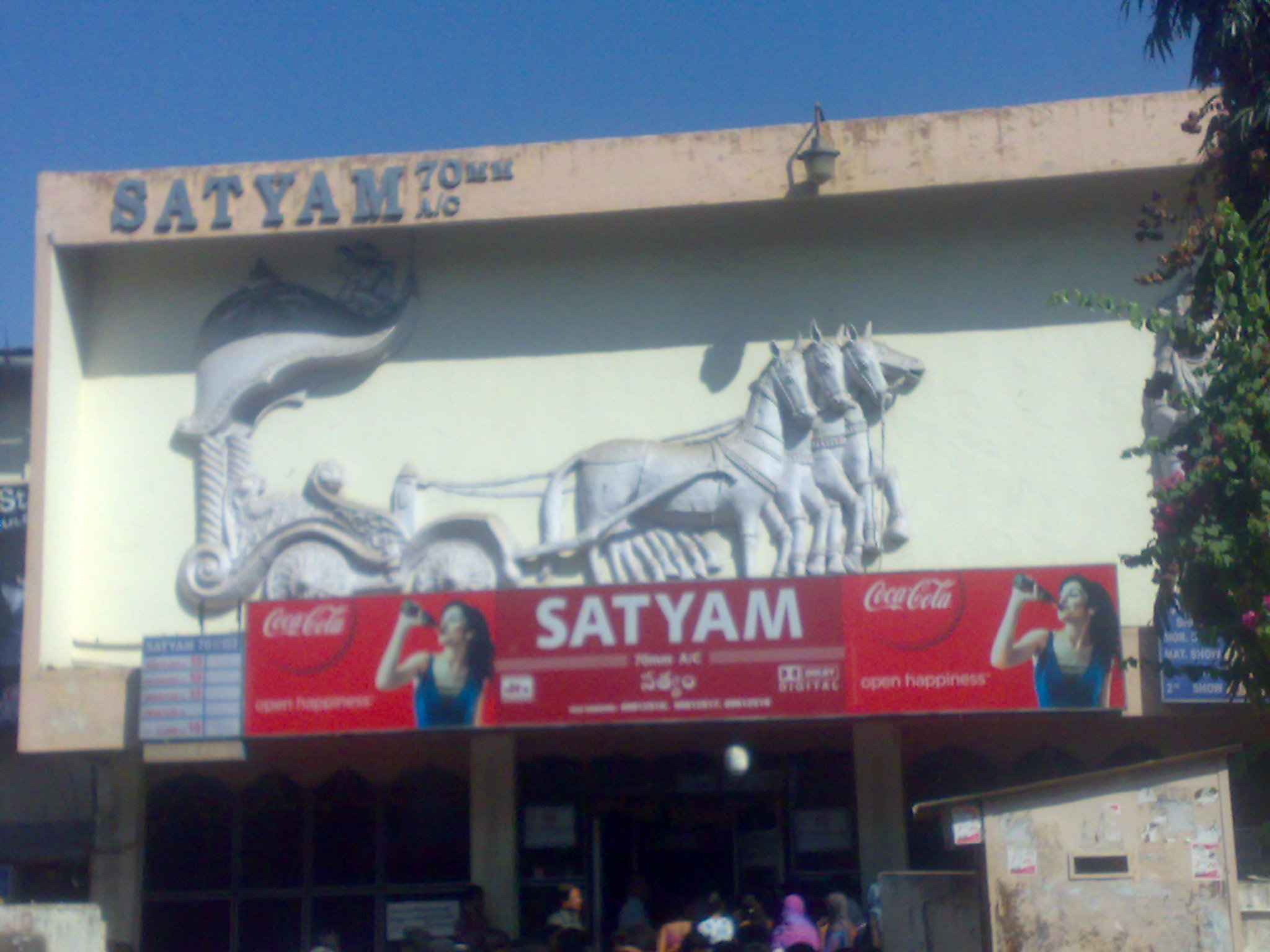
old Satyam theatre (now it is converted to Asian Satyam Mall)

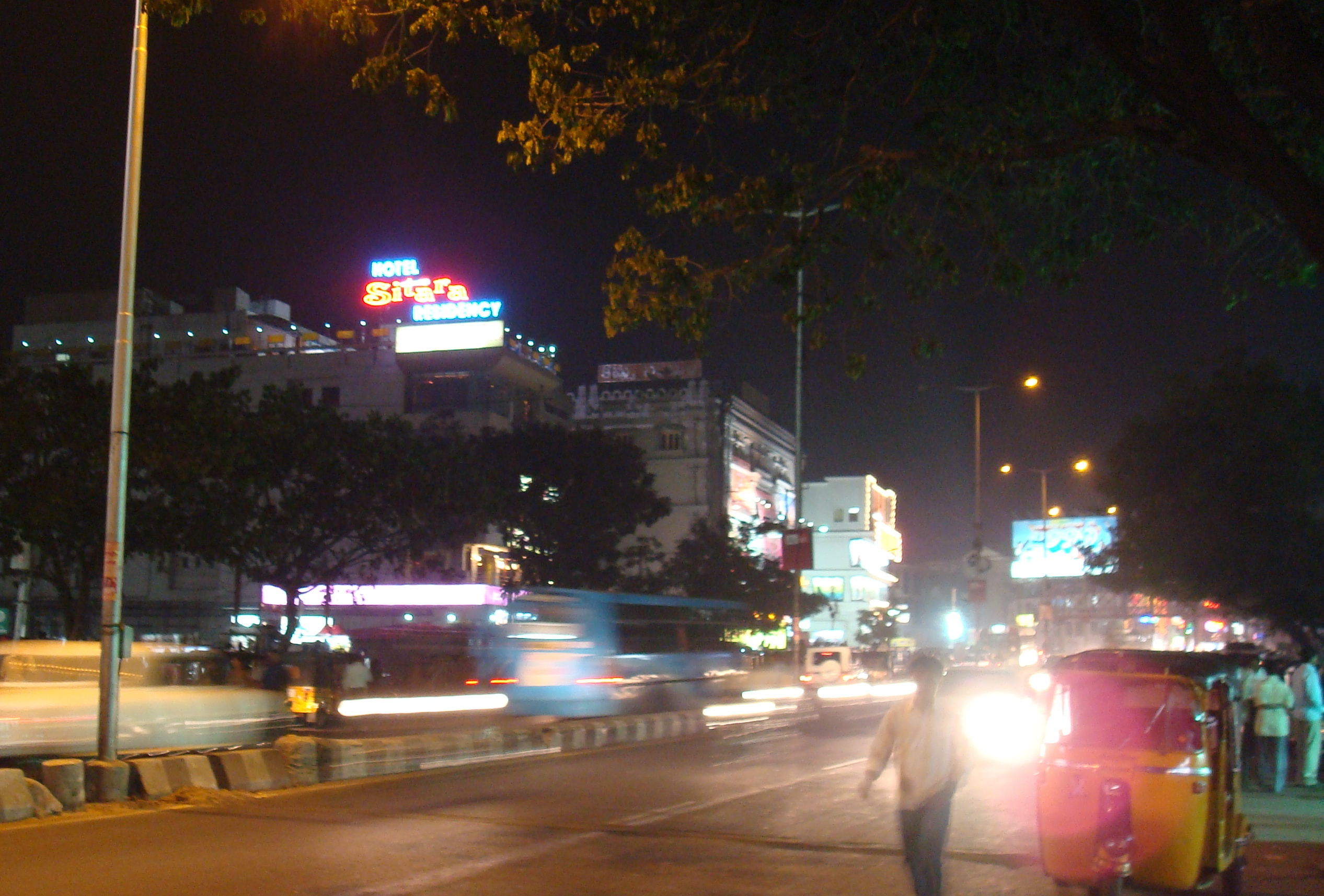
Hotel Sitara Residency

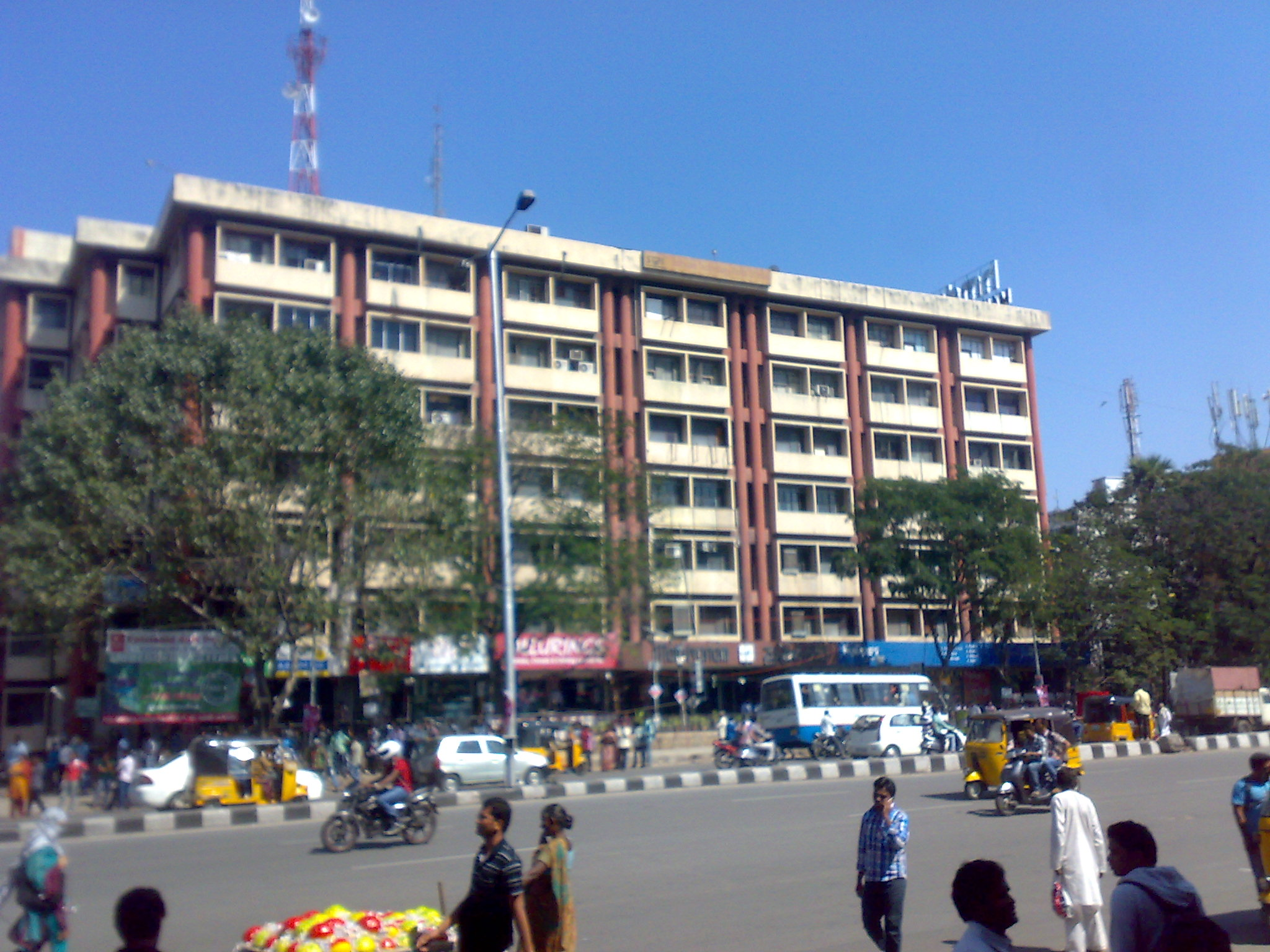
Full view of Mythrivanam Building

== Other details ==
The pin code number 500016 belongs to Hyderabad, Telangana which covers 2 post offices. The first two digit of pin code denotes 50, which is listed in Telangana.
