= Raj Bhavan Road =

- neighbourhood
- Raj Bhavan Road
- Country: India
- State: Telangana
- District: Hyderabad
- Metro: Hyderabad

Government
  - Body: GHMC

Languages
  - Official: Telugu
- Time zone: UTC+5:30 (IST)
- PIN: 500 082
- Lok Sabha constituency: Secunderabad Lok Sabha constituency
- Vidhan Sabha constituency: Khairatabad Assembly constituency
- Planning agency: GHMC

Raj Bhavan Road is a prominent political and commercial area of Hyderabad, Telangana, India. It is home to the residence of the Governor of Telangana called as Raj Bhavan, hence the name. It also has Lake View Guest House, a state owned guest house for the visiting dignitaries. It overlooks the Hussain sagar lake to its east.

== Commercial area ==
There are some upmarket shops on this road.

Reliance Communications is headquartered here.

== Transport ==
Khairatabad is the closest MMTS Train station for this suburb.

Buses are run by the state-owned TGSRTC (Telangana State Road Transport Corporation), and is well connected to all parts of Hyderabad.
