= Chaitanyapuri metro station =

Metro station in Hyderabad, India

Chaitanyapuri

General information
- Location: Chaitanyapuri, Opp Shalini Theatre, Dilsukh Nagar Main Rd, Kothapet, Hyderabad, Telangana- 500060.
- Coordinates: 17.3682882°N 78.5357829°E
- System: Hyderabad Metro station
- Owner: Hyderabad Metro
- Line: Red Line
- Platforms: 2
- Tracks: 2

Construction
- Structure type: Elevated
- Platform levels: 2

History
- Opened: 24 September 2018

Services
Preceding station	Hyderabad Metro	Following station
Dilsukhnagar towards Miyapur	Red Line	Victoria Memorial towards LB Nagar
Location

The Chaitanyapuri Metro Station is located on the Red Line of the Hyderabad Metro, in India. It is near to Omni Super Speciality Hospital, Fruit market, GBR Hospital, Viajy Textiles, APSRTC Bus stop, Annie Beasant college, Saroor Nagar Arch and PVT Market.

== History ==
It was opened on 24 September 2018.

== The station ==
=== Structure ===
Chaitanyapuri elevated metro station situated on the Red Line of Hyderabad Metro.

=== Facilities ===
The stations have staircases, elevators and escalators from the street level to the platform level which provide easy and comfortable access. Also, operation panels inside the elevators are installed at a level that can be conveniently operated by all passengers, including disabled and elderly citizens.

=== Station layout ===
Street Level
This is the first level where passengers may park their vehicles and view the local area map.

Concourse level
Ticketing office or Ticket Vending Machines (TVMs) is located here. Retail outlets and other facilities like washrooms, ATMs, first aid, etc., will be available in this area.

Platform level
This layer consists of two platforms. Trains takes passengers from this level.

G	Street level	Exit/Entrance
L1	Mezzanine	Fare control, station agent, Metro Card vending machines, crossover
L2	Side platform | Doors will open on the left
L2	Platform 1 Southbound	Towards → Vasavi LB Nagar next station is Victoria Memorial
L2	Platform 2 Northbound	Towards ← Miyapur next station is Dilsukhnagar
L2	Side platform | Doors will open on the left
L2

== Train service ==
Three coaches trains runs through this station between Miyapur and LB Nagar every 3.5 – 7 minutes.
