= Osmania Medical College metro station =

Metro station in Hyderabad, India

Osmania Medical College
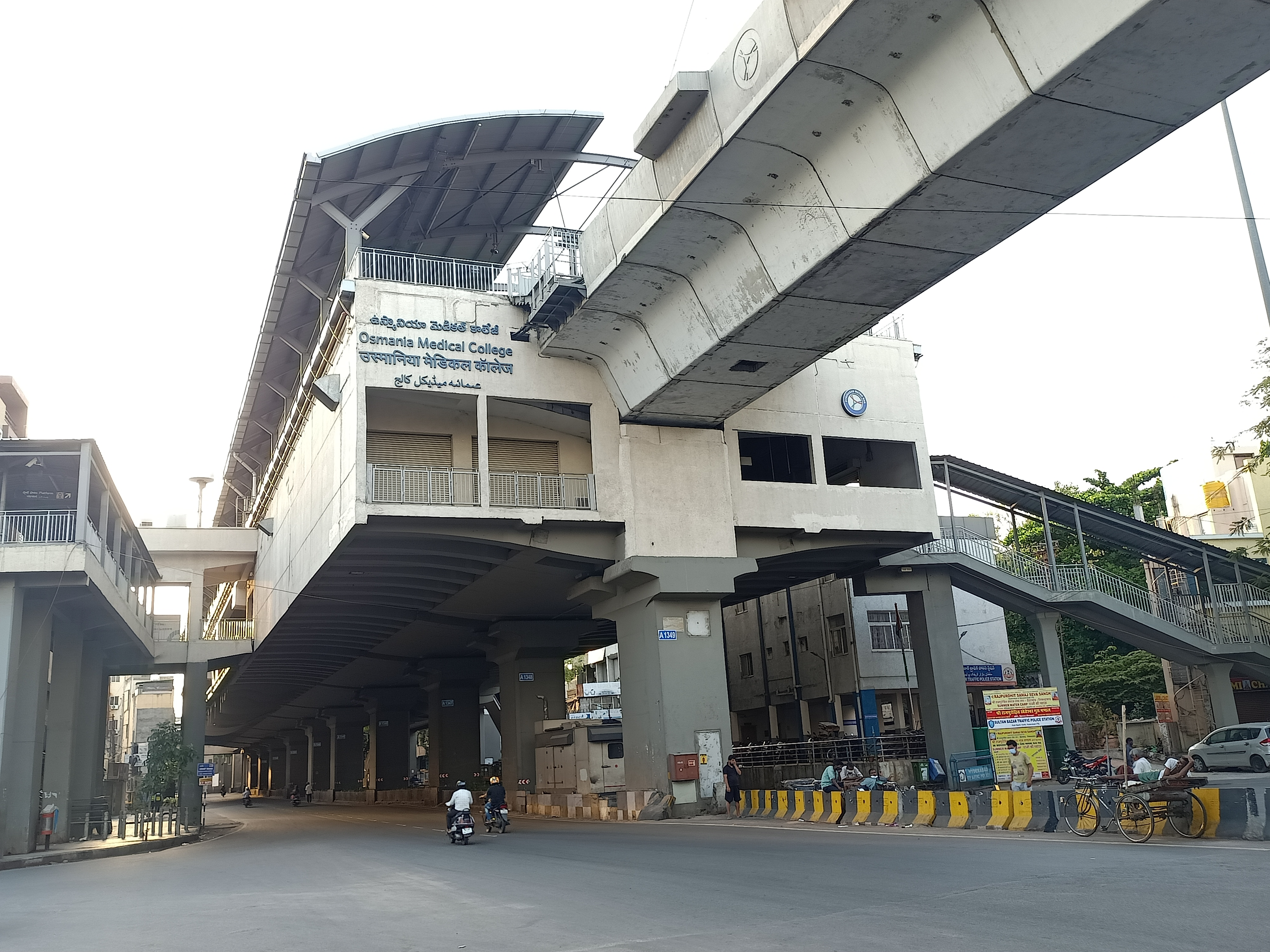

General information
- Location: 5/1/516/2, Jambagh Rd, Troop Bazaar, Koti, Hyderabad, Telangana 500095
- Coordinates: 17.3823887°N 78.4789574°E
- System: Hyderabad Metro station
- Line: Red Line
- Platforms: Side platform Platform-1 → Vasavi LB Nagar; Platform-2 →Miyapur
- Tracks: 2

Construction
- Structure type: Elevated, Double-track
- Platform levels: 2
- Parking: Available
- Cycle facilities: Available
- Accessible: Disabled access

Other information
- Status: Staffed, Operational

History
- Opened: 29 November 2017; 8 years ago
- Electrified: 25 kV 50 Hz AC through overhead catenary

Services
Preceding station	Hyderabad Metro	Following station
Gandhi Bhavan towards Miyapur	Red Line	MG Bus Station towards LB Nagar
Location
- Location within Hyderabad Location within Telangana Location within India

Osmania Medical College Metro Station is located on the Red Line of the Hyderabad Metro, India. This station was opened to public on 2018. It is near to Maharani Jhansi Road, Putli Bowli, Fruit Market, Jambagh Road, Osmania Medical College, Koti Bus stop and Vivek Vardhini College.

== History ==
It was opened on 24 September 2018.

== The station ==
=== Structure ===
Osmania Medical College elevated metro station situated on the Red Line of Hyderabad Metro.

=== Facilities ===
The stations have staircases, elevators and escalators from the street level to the platform level which provide easy and comfortable access. Also, operation panels inside the elevators are installed at a level that can be conveniently operated by all passengers, including disabled and elderly citizens.

=== Station layout ===
Street Level
This is the first level where passengers may park their vehicles and view the local area map.

Concourse level
Ticketing office or Ticket Vending Machines (TVMs) is located here. Retail outlets and other facilities like washrooms, ATMs, first aid, etc., will be available in this area.

Platform level
This layer consists of two platforms. Trains takes passengers from this level.

G	Street level	Exit/Entrance
L1	Mezzanine	Fare control, station agent, Metro Card vending machines, crossover
L2	Side platform | Doors will open on the left
L2	Platform 1 Southbound	Towards → Vasavi LB Nagar next station is M.G. Bus Station Change at the next station for Green Line
L2	Platform 2 Northbound	Towards ← Miyapur next station is Gandhi Bhavan
L2	Side platform | Doors will open on the left
L2

== Entry/exit ==
Osmania Medical College station Entry/exits
Gate No-A	Gate No-B	Gate No-C	Gate No-D

== See also ==
- Hyderabad
- Transport in Hyderabad
- List of rapid transit systems
- List of metro systems
