= Erragadda metro station =

Metro station in India

Erragadda

General information
- Location: Sanath Nagar Rd, Czech Colony, Sanath Nagar, Hyderabad, Telangana, 500018
- Coordinates: 17.4567784°N 78.4304257°E
- System: Hyderabad Metro station
- Line: Red Line
- Platforms: Side platform Platform-1 → Vasavi LB Nagar; Platform-2 → Miyapur
- Tracks: 2

Construction
- Structure type: Elevated, double-track
- Platform levels: 2
- Parking: available
- Cycle facilities: Available
- Accessible: Disabled access

Other information
- Status: Staffed, operational

History
- Opened: 29 November 2017; 8 years ago
- Electrified: 25 kV 50 Hz AC through overhead catenary

Services
Preceding station	Hyderabad Metro	Following station
Bharat Nagar towards Miyapur	Red Line	E.S.I Hospital towards LB Nagar
Route map
Location
- Location within Hyderabad Location within Telangana Location within India

The Erragadda metro station is located on the Red Line of the Hyderabad Metro, India. It was opened to the public in 2017. It is near Shivalayam Temple, Food Corporation of India, and Bharat Petroleum.

== History ==
The stations was opened on 29 November 2017.

== Structure ==
This elevated metro station is situated on the Red Line of Hyderabad Metro.

== Facilities ==
The stations have staircases, elevators and escalators from the street level to the platform level which provide easy and comfortable access. Operation panels inside the elevators are installed at a level that can be conveniently operated by all passengers, including disabled and elderly citizens.

== Station layout ==
Street level
This is the first level, where passengers may park their vehicles and view the local area map.

Concourse level
Ticketing office or ticket vending machines (TVMs) is located here. Retail outlets and other facilities like washrooms, ATMs, and first aid are available in this area.

Platform level
This layer consists of two platforms. Trains take passengers from this level.

G	Street level	Exit/entrance
L1	Mezzanine	Fare control, station agent, Metro Card vending machines, crossover
L2	Side platform | Doors will open on the left
L2	Platform 1 Southbound	Towards → Vasavi LB Nagar next station is ESI Hospital
L2	Platform 2 Northbound	Towards ← Miyapur next station is Indian Oil Bharat Nagar
L2	Side platform | Doors will open on the left
L2

== See also ==
- Hyderabad
- Transport in Hyderabad
- List of rapid transit systems
- List of metro systems
