= New Market metro station =

Metro station in Hyderabad, India

New Market

General information
- Location: 16-2-689/3, NH 65, Palton, Dayanand Nagar, New Malakpet, Hyderabad, Telangana- 500036
- Coordinates: 17.3734°N 78.5031°E
- System: Hyderabad Metro station
- Line: Red Line
- Platforms: 2
- Tracks: 2

Construction
- Structure type: Elevated
- Platform levels: 2

History
- Opened: 24 September 2018

Services
Preceding station	Hyderabad Metro	Following station
Malakpet towards Miyapur	Red Line	Musarambagh towards LB Nagar
Location

The New Market Metro Station is located on the Red Line of the Hyderabad Metro, in India. This station was opened to public on 2018. It is near to Sushrutha Hospital, Palton Road, Malakpet Gunj, Bank Of Baroda, Essar Petrol Pump, Vijaya Bank and Jamia Masjid street.

== History ==
It was opened on 24 September 2018.

== The station ==
=== Structure ===
New Market elevated metro station situated on the Red Line of Hyderabad Metro.

=== Facilities ===
The stations have staircases, elevators and escalators from the street level to the platform level which provide easy and comfortable access. Also, operation panels inside the elevators are installed at a level that can be conveniently operated by all passengers, including disabled and elderly citizens.

=== Station layout ===
Street Level
This is the first level where passengers may park their vehicles and view the local area map.

Concourse level
Ticketing office or Ticket Vending Machines (TVMs) is located here. Retail outlets and other facilities like washrooms, ATMs, first aid, etc., will be available in this area.

Platform level
This layer consists of two platforms. Trains takes passengers from this level.

G	Street level	Exit/Entrance
L1	Mezzanine	Fare control, station agent, Metro Card vending machines, crossover
L2	Side platform | Doors will open on the left
L2	Platform 1 Southbound	Towards → Vasavi LB Nagar next station is Musarambagh
L2	Platform 2 Northbound	Towards ← Miyapur next station is Malakpet
L2	Side platform | Doors will open on the left
L2

== Train service ==
Three coaches trains runs through this station between Miyapur and LB Nagar every 3.5 – 7 minutes.
