= Bharat Nagar metro station =

Metro station in Hyderabad, India

Indian Oil Bharat Nagar
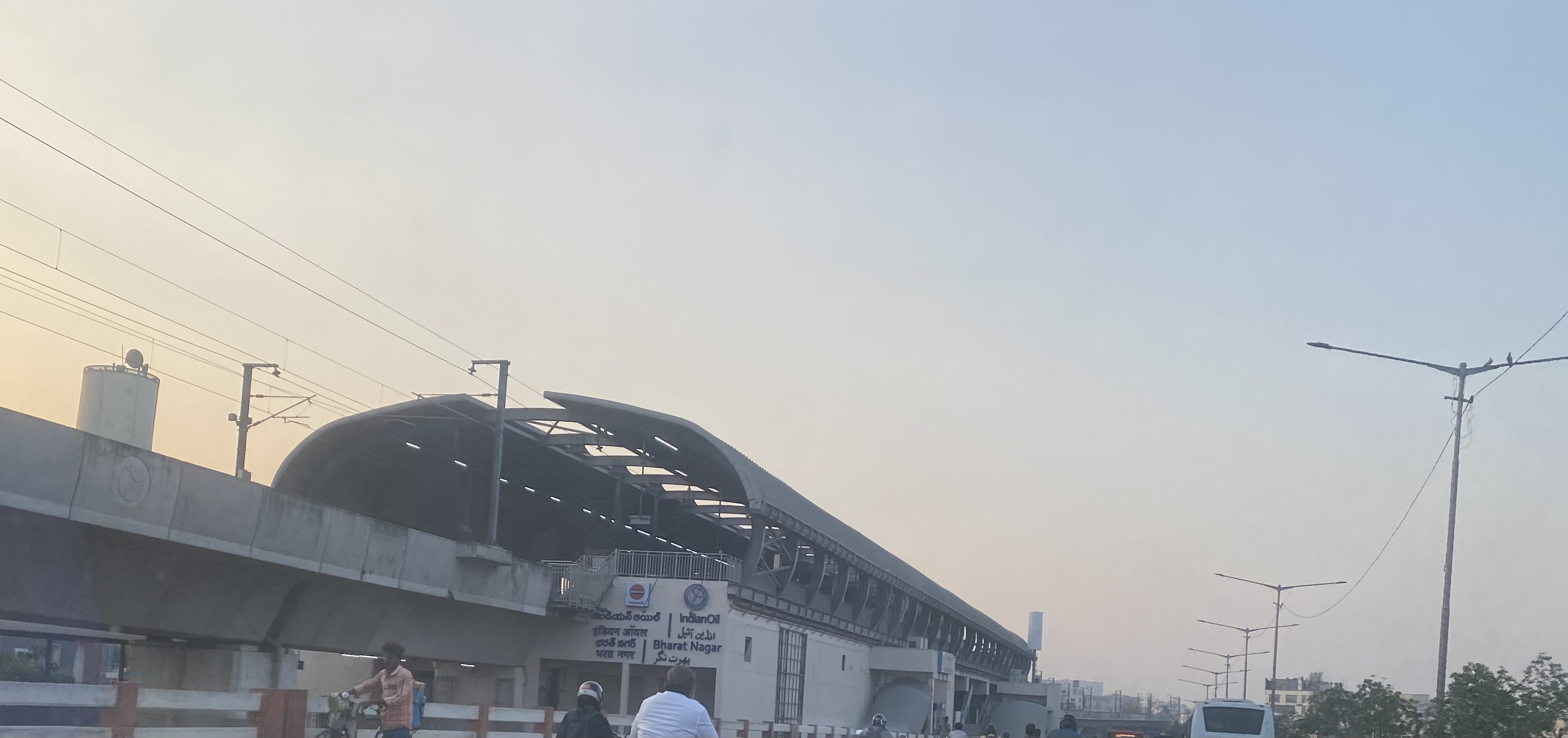
- Exterior view of Bharat Nagar metro station

General information
- Location: Bharat Nagar Colony, Sultan Bagh, Hyderabad, Telangana- 500018.
- Coordinates: 17.463997°N 78.4278693°E
- System: Hyderabad Metro station
- Line: Red Line
- Platforms: Side platform Platform-1 → Vasavi LB Nagar; Platform-2 → Miyapur
- Tracks: 2
- Connections: Bharat Nagar

Construction
- Structure type: Elevated, Double-track
- Platform levels: 2
- Parking: Available
- Cycle facilities: Available
- Accessible: Disabled access

Other information
- Status: Staffed, Operational

History
- Opened: 29 November 2017; 8 years ago
- Electrified: 25 kV 50 Hz AC through overhead catenary

Services
Preceding station	Hyderabad Metro	Following station
Moosapet towards Miyapur	Red Line	Erragadda towards LB Nagar
Route map
Location
- Location within Hyderabad Location within Telangana Location within India

Bharat Nagar (also known as Indian Oil Bharat Nagar) is a metro station in Bharat Nagar located on the Red Line of the Hyderabad Metro, in India. This station was opened to public on 2017. It is near to Bharat Nagar railway station, Rythu Bazaar, TSRTC Bus Stop, Asian Cine Pride, Nalla Pochamma Temple, Bandhan Apartments and Axis bank ATM.

== History ==
It was opened on 29 November 2017.

== The station ==
=== Structure ===
Bharat Nagar elevated metro station situated on the Red Line of Hyderabad Metro.

=== Facilities ===
The stations have staircases, elevators and escalators from the street level to the platform level which provide easy and comfortable access. Also, operation panels inside the elevators are installed at a level that can be conveniently operated by all passengers, including disabled and elderly citizens.

=== Station layout ===
Street Level
This is the first level where passengers may park their vehicles and view the local area map.

Concourse level
Ticketing office or Ticket Vending Machines (TVMs) is located here. Retail outlets and other facilities like washrooms, ATMs, first aid, etc., will be available in this area.

Platform level
This layer consists of two platforms. Trains takes passengers from this level.

G	Street level	Exit/Entrance
L1	Mezzanine	Fare control, station agent, Metro Card vending machines, crossover
L2	Side platform | Doors will open on the left
L2	Platform 1 Southbound	Towards → Vasavi LB Nagar next station is Erragadda
L2	Platform 2 Northbound	Towards ← Miyapur next station is Moosapet
L2	Side platform | Doors will open on the left
L2

== See also ==
- Hyderabad
- Transport in Hyderabad
- List of rapid transit systems
- List of metro systems
