= Dr. B. R. Ambedkar Balanagar metro station =

Metro station in Hyderabad, India

Dr. B. R. Ambedkar Balanagar

General information
- Location: Near Balanagar Y Junction, Near Chennai Shopping Mall, Hyderabad, India
- Coordinates: 17.4965811°N 78.3676732°E
- System: Hyderabad Metro station
- Line: Red Line
- Platforms: Side platform Platform-1 → Vasavi LB Nagar; Platform-2 → Miyapur
- Tracks: 2

Construction
- Structure type: Elevated, Double-track
- Platform levels: 2
- Parking: Available
- Cycle facilities: Available
- Accessible: Disabled access

Other information
- Status: Staffed, Operational

History
- Opened: 29 November 2017; 8 years ago
- Electrified: 25 kV 50 Hz AC through overhead catenary

Services
Preceding station	Hyderabad Metro	Following station
Kukatpally towards Miyapur	Red Line	Moosapet towards LB Nagar
Route map
Location
- Location within Hyderabad Location within Telangana Location within India

The Dr. B. R. Ambedkar Balanagar Metro Station is located on the Red Line of the Hyderabad Metro, in India. This station was opened to the public on 29 November 2017, named Balanagar Metro Station. It was renamed on 14 April 2018. It is near to Chennai Shopping Mall.

== History ==
It was opened on 29 November 2017.

== The station ==
=== Structure ===
Balanagar elevated metro station situated on the Red Line of Hyderabad Metro.

=== Facilities ===
The stations have staircases, elevators and escalators from the street level to the platform level which provide easy and comfortable access. Also, operation panels inside the elevators are installed at a level that can be conveniently operated by all passengers, including disabled and elderly citizens.

=== Station layout ===
Street Level
This is the first level where passengers may park their vehicles and view the local area map.

Concourse level
Ticketing office or Ticket Vending Machines (TVMs) is located here. Retail outlets and other facilities like washrooms, ATMs, first aid, etc., will be available in this area.

Platform level
This layer consists of two platforms. Trains takes passengers from this level.

G	Street level	Exit/Entrance
L1	Mezzanine	Fare control, station agent, Metro Card vending machines, crossover
L2	Side platform | Doors will open on the left
L2	Platform 1 Southbound	Towards → Vasavi LB Nagar next station is Moosapet
L2	Platform 2 Northbound	Towards ← Miyapur next station is Kukatpally
L2	Side platform | Doors will open on the left
L2

== See also ==
- Hyderabad
- Transport in Hyderabad
- List of rapid transit systems
- List of metro systems
