= Assembly metro station =

Metro station in Hyderabad, India

Assembly
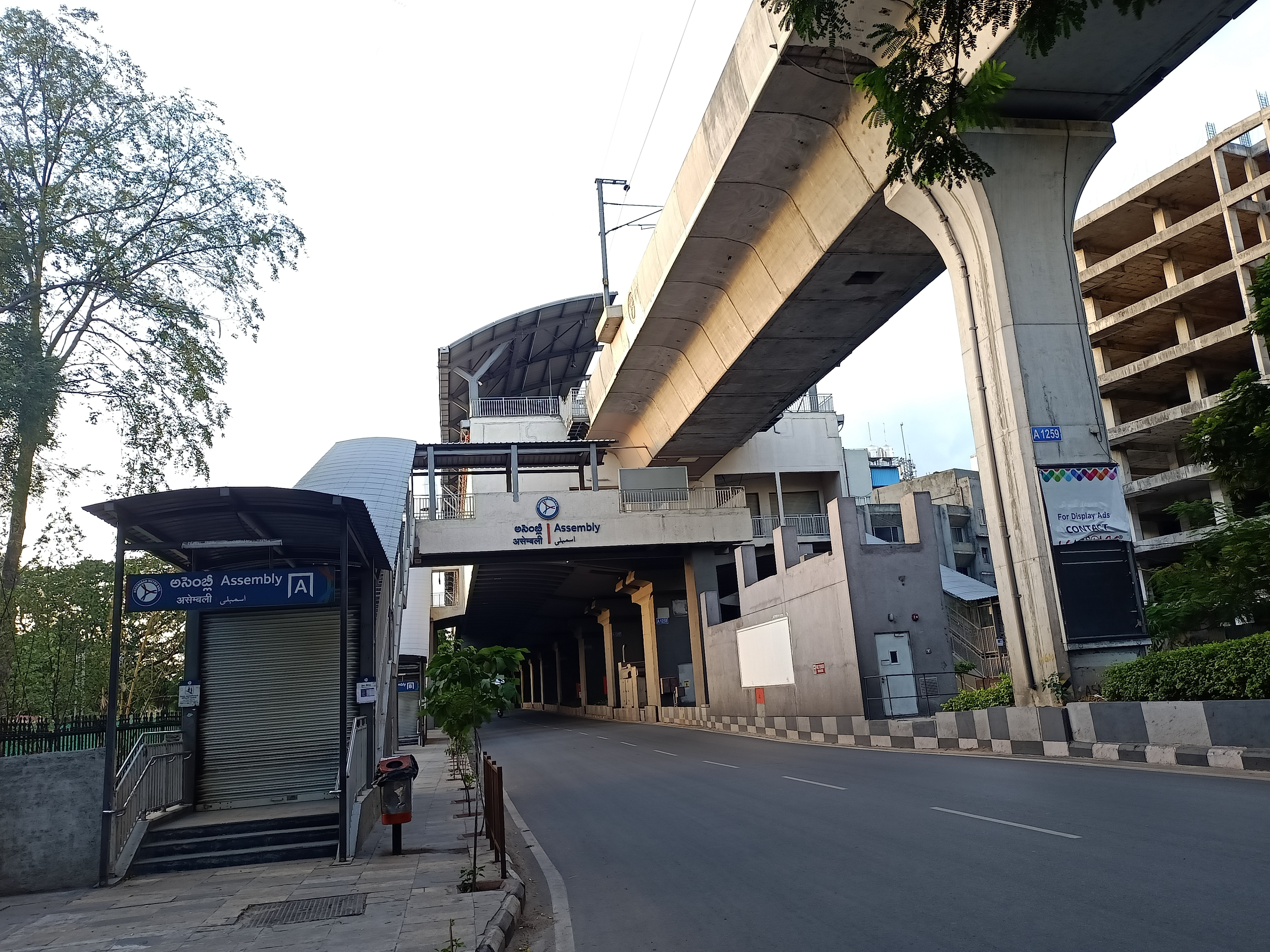

General information
- Location: Near Ysr Ap State Museum, Road, Public Gardens, Red Hills, Lakdikapul,, Hyderabad, Telangana.
- Coordinates: 17.3978004°N 78.4699168°E
- System: Hyderabad Metro station
- Line: Red Line
- Platforms: Side platform Platform-1 → Vasavi LB Nagar; Platform-2 →Miyapur
- Tracks: 2

Construction
- Structure type: Elevated, Double-track
- Platform levels: 2
- Parking: Available
- Cycle facilities: Available
- Accessible: Disabled access

Other information
- Status: Staffed, Operational

History
- Opened: 24 September 2018; 7 years ago
- Electrified: 25 kV 50 Hz AC through overhead catenary

Services
Preceding station	Hyderabad Metro	Following station
Lakdi-ka-pul towards Miyapur	Red Line	Nampally towards LB Nagar
Location
- Location within Hyderabad Location within Telangana Location within India

The Assembly metro station is located on the Red Line of the Hyderabad Metro in India. This station was opened to public on 2018. It is near to Assembly, Public Garden, RBI, Nizam Club, Prasar Bharati, L.B.Stadium road, All India Radio, Archeology Museum and Nampally Railway Station.

== The station ==
The station was opened on 24 September 2018.

=== Structure ===
Assembly elevated metro station is situated on the Red Line of Hyderabad Metro.

=== Facilities ===
The stations have staircases, elevators and escalators from the street level to the platform level which provide easy and comfortable access. Also, operation panels inside the elevators are installed at a level that can be conveniently operated by all passengers, including disabled and elderly citizens.

=== Station layout ===
Street Level
This is the first level where passengers may park their vehicles and view the local area map.

Concourse level
Ticketing office or Ticket Vending Machines (TVMs) is located here. Retail outlets and other facilities like washrooms, ATMs, first aid, etc., will be available in this area.

Platform level
This layer consists of two platforms. Trains takes passengers from this level.

G	Street level	Exit/Entrance
L1	Mezzanine	Fare control, station agent, Metro Card vending machines, crossover
L2	Side platform | Doors will open on the left
L2	Platform 1 Southbound	Towards → Vasavi LB Nagar next station is Nampally
L2	Platform 2 Northbound	Towards ← Miyapur next station is NMDC Lakdi-ka-pul
L2	Side platform | Doors will open on the left
L2

== See also ==
- Hyderabad
- Transport in Hyderabad
- List of rapid transit systems
- List of metro systems
