= Victoria Memorial metro station =

Metro station in Hyderabad, India

Victoria Memorial

General information
- Location: L. B. Nagar
- Coordinates: 17.348426°N 78.550959°E
- System: Hyderabad Metro station
- Owner: Hyderabad Metro
- Line: Red Line
- Tracks: 2

Construction
- Structure type: Elevated
- Depth: 7.07 m (23.2 ft)
- Platform levels: 2
- Parking: Available

History
- Opened: 24 September 2018

Services
Preceding station	Hyderabad Metro	Following station
Chaitanyapuri towards Miyapur	Red Line	LB Nagar Terminus
Location

The Victoria Memorial Metro Station is located on the Red Line of the Hyderabad Metro, India. It is part of Corridor I of Hyderabad metro starting from Miyapur and was opened to public on 24 September 2018.

== Etymology ==
This metro station is named after Victoria Memorial Home (Saroornagar-e-Mahal), constructed in 1901 by Nizam, Mahbub Ali Khan, Asaf Jah VI. It is located near Sri Khilla Maisamma Temple.

== Station layout ==
Street Level
This is the first level where passengers may park their vehicles and view the local area map.

Concourse level
Ticketing office or Ticket Vending Machines (TVMs) is located here. Retail outlets and other facilities like washrooms, ATMs, first aid, etc., will be available in this area.

Platform level
This layer consists of two platforms. Trains takes passengers from this level.

G	Street level	Exit/Entrance
L1	Mezzanine	Fare control, station agent, Metro Card vending machines, crossover
L2	Side platform | Doors will open on the left
L2	Platform 1 Southbound	Towards → Vasavi LB Nagar
L2	Platform 2 Northbound	Towards ← Miyapur next station is Chaitanyapuri
L2	Side platform | Doors will open on the left
L2

== History ==
It was opened to public on 24 September 2018.
