= Malakpet metro station =

Metro station in Hyderabad, India

Malakpet
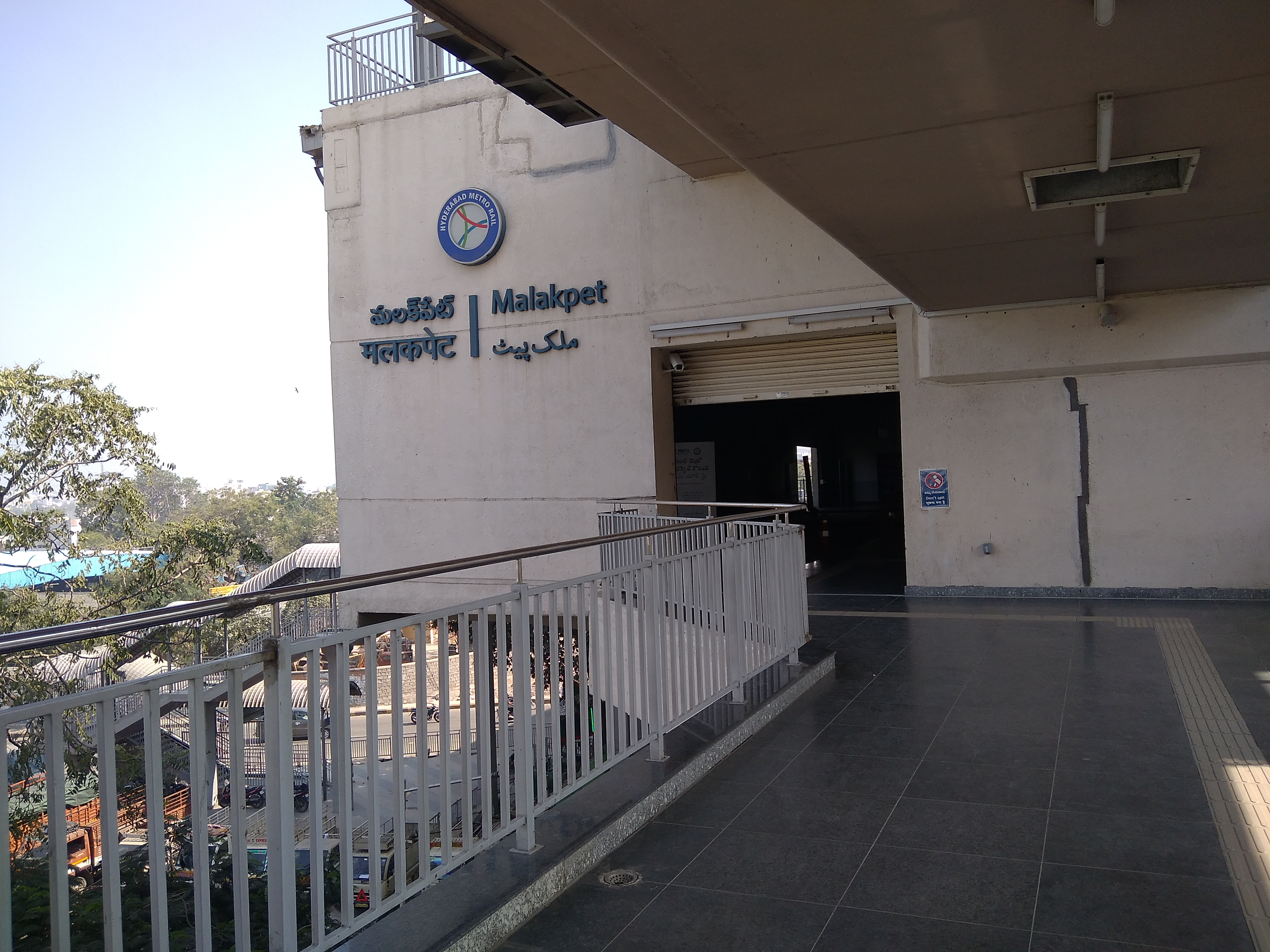

General information
- Location: Nh65 Sri Krupa Market, Old Malakpet, Hyderabad
- Coordinates: 17.3772°N 78.4940°E
- System: Hyderabad Metro station
- Line: Red Line
- Platforms: 2
- Tracks: 2
- Connections: Malakpet

Construction
- Structure type: Elevated
- Platform levels: 2

History
- Opened: 24 September 2018

Services
Preceding station	Hyderabad Metro	Following station
MG Bus Station towards Miyapur	Red Line	New Market towards LB Nagar
Location

The Malakpet Metro Station is located on the Red Line of the Hyderabad Metro, India. This station was opened to public on 2018. The eastern parts of the old city have access to the metro via the Malakpet metro station.

== History ==
It was opened on 24 September 2018.

== The station ==
=== Structure ===
Malakpet elevated metro station situated on the Red Line of Hyderabad Metro.

=== Facilities ===
The stations have staircases, elevators and escalators from the street level to the platform level which provide easy and comfortable access. Also, operation panels inside the elevators are installed at a level that can be conveniently operated by all passengers, including disabled and elderly citizens.

=== Station layout ===
Street Level
This is the first level where passengers may park their vehicles and view the local area map.

Concourse level
Ticketing office or Ticket Vending Machines (TVMs) is located here. Retail outlets and other facilities like washrooms, ATMs, first aid, etc., will be available in this area.

Platform level
This layer consists of two platforms. Trains takes passengers from this level.

G	Street level	Exit/Entrance
L1	Mezzanine	Fare control, station agent, Metro Card vending machines, crossover
L2	Side platform | Doors will open on the left
L2	Platform 1 Southbound	Towards → Vasavi LB Nagar next station is New Market
L2	Platform 2 Northbound	Towards ← Miyapur next station is M.G. Bus Station Change at the next station for Green Line
L2	Side platform | Doors will open on the left
L2

== Connections ==
=== Train ===
Malakpet railway station of Indian Railways is situated nearby.
