= MG Bus Station metro station =

Metro station in Hyderabad, India

MG Bus Station
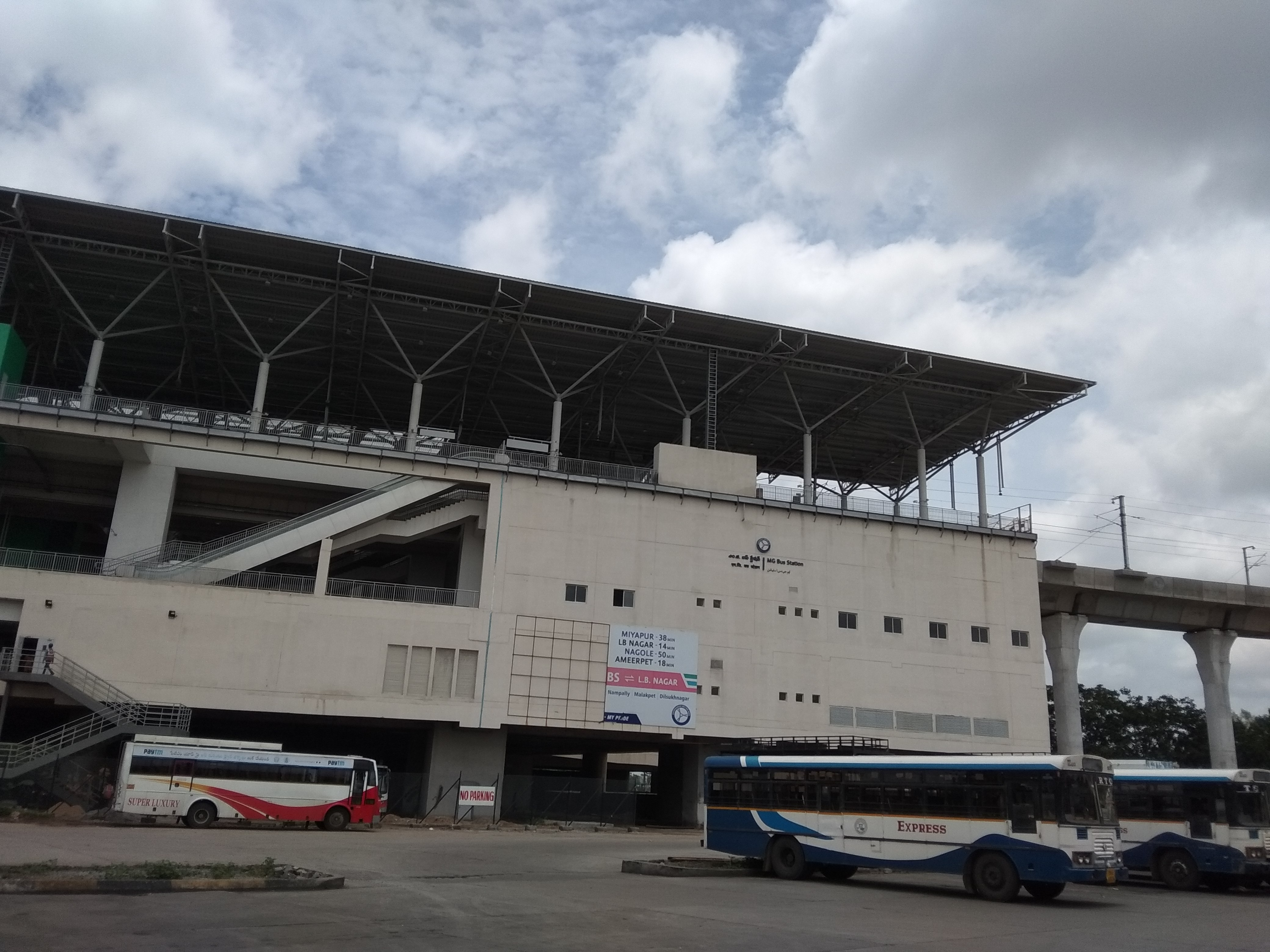

General information
- Location: Imlibun, Gowliguda North, Mahatma Gandhi bus station, Hyderabad
- Coordinates: 17.378055°N 78.480005°E
- System: Hyderabad Metro station
- Line: Red Line Green Line
- Platforms: 4
- Tracks: 4
- Connections: Mahatma Gandhi Bus Station

Construction
- Structure type: Elevated
- Depth: 7.07 m (23.2 ft)
- Platform levels: 2
- Parking: Available (not available in some areas)

History
- Opened: 24 September 2018; 7 years ago

Services
Preceding station	Hyderabad Metro	Following station
Osmania Medical College towards Miyapur	Red Line	Malakpet towards LB Nagar
Sultan Bazaar towards Parade Ground	Green Line	Salarjung Museum towards Falaknuma
Location

MG Bus Station (MGBS) metro station is an interchange metro station between Red Line and Green Line of the Hyderabad Metro in India. The MG Bus Station Inter-change Metro Station has become one of the largest metro station in Asia, with a sprawling premises over 280,000 square feet (26,000 m^{2}). In September 2025, Passport Seva Kendra (PSK) was opened at MGBS metro station, which makes it the first passport office in the country to be located in a metro station.

== History ==
It was opened on 24 September 2018.

== Facilities ==
It is even bigger than Ameerpet metro station. The commuters can switch between the LB Nagar–Miyapur and JBS–Falaknuma stretches of Hyderabad Metro Rail. MG Bus Station metro station is spread over a length of 140 metres and a width of 45 metres. The Corridor-I (Miyapur–L B Nagar) station is at the first and second floors, the Corridor-II (JBS–Falaknuma) station is in the upper, third and fourth floors.
