= Bharat Nagar railway station =

Railway station in Hyderabad, India

Bharat Nagar
- Bharat Nagar station

General information
- Location: Hyderabad, Telangana; India
- Coordinates: 17.4621°N 78.4294°E
- System: Indian Railways and Hyderabad MMTS station
- Operator: Hyderabad Multi-Modal Transport System
- Line: Secunderabad–Falaknuma route
- Connections: Red Line Bharat Nagar
Location

Bharat Nagar railway station is a railway station in Hyderabad, Telangana, India. Localities like Kukatpally and Nizampet are accessible from this station.

This station is connected by a short walk to Exit Arm A of the Bharat Nagar metro station operated by Hyderabad Metro Rail

== Lines ==
- Multi-Modal Transport System, Hyderabad
  - Secunderabad–Falaknuma route (FS Line)

Other than MMTS trains no trains will stop here. No wheel chair facility. Direct auto from this station to Moti Nagar, Borabanda.
