= Red Line (Hyderabad Metro) =

Line of Hyderabad's metro

Overview
- Owner: Larsen & Toubro (90%); Government of Telangana (10%)
- Locale: Hyderabad, Telangana, India
- Termini: Miyapur; LB Nagar
- Stations: 27

Service
- Type: Metro
- System: Hyderabad Metro
- Operator: Hyderabad Metro Rail Ltd. (HMRL)
- Depot: Miyapur
- Rolling stock: Hyundai Rotem

History
- Opened: 29 November 2017; 8 years ago
- Last extension: 2018

Technical
- Line length: 29.21 km (18.15 mi)
- Character: Elevated
- Track gauge: 1,435 mm (4 ft 8 1/2 in) standard gauge
- Electrification: 25 kV 50 Hz AC overhead catenary
- Operating speed: 80 km/h (50 mph)

The Red Line is a part of the Hyderabad Metro system in Telangana, India. The line is 29.21 km long and spans 27 stations from Miyapur to LB Nagar. It was funded by a public–private partnership, with the state government holding a minority equity stake. A special purpose vehicle company, L&T Metro Rail Hyderabad Ltd (L&TMRHL), was established by the construction company Larsen & Toubro (L&T) to develop the Hyderabad Metro rail project.

The groundbreaking (Bhoomi Puja) for the project was conducted on 26 April 2012, and construction began with pillar erection on the same day. A 11.3-kilometre (7.0-mile) stretch of the Red Line from Miyapur to Ameerpet, with 11 stations, was inaugurated on 28 November 2017 by Prime Minister Narendra Modi, and opened to the public the next day. The remaining section from Ameerpet to LB Nagar was opened on 24 September 2018.

== Construction ==
Red Line sections were opened as indicated below.

Red Line
Stage	Extension date	Terminal stations		Length	Stations
1	29 November 2017	Miyapur	Ameerpet	11.3 km	11
2	24 September 2018	Ameerpet	LB Nagar	16.8 km	16
Total		Miyapur	LB Nagar	29.21 km (18.15 mi)	27

== Stations ==
There are 27 stations and 16 proposed stations on the Red Line. All stations are elevated.

Red Line
#	Station name		Opened	Connections	Alignment
#	English	Telugu	Opened	Connections	Alignment
1	Patancheru	పటాన్చెరు	Proposed	None	Elevated
2	ICRISAT	ఐ సి ఆర్ ఐ ఎస్ ఎ టి	Proposed	None	Elevated
3	R.C Puram	ఆర్.సి పురం	Proposed	None	Elevated
4	Beeramanguda	బీరమంగూడ	Proposed	None	Elevated
5	Jyoti Nagar	జ్యోతి నగర్	Proposed	None	Elevated
6	BHEL	బి హెచ్ ఇ ఎల్	Proposed	None	Elevated
7	Chanda Nagar	చందానగర్	Proposed	None	Elevated
8	Madinaguda	మదీనాగూడ	Proposed	None	Elevated
9	Allwyn X Road	ఆల్విన్ ఎక్స్ రోడ్	Proposed	None	Elevated
10	Miyapur X Road	మియాపూర్ ఎక్స్ రోడ్	Proposed	None	Elevated
11	Miyapur	మియాపూర్	29 November 2017	None	Elevated
12	JNTU College	జె ఎన్ టి యు కాలేజీ	29 November 2017	Airport shuttle	Elevated
13	KPHB Colony	కె పి హెచ్ బి కాలనీ	29 November 2017	None	Elevated
14	Kukatpally	కూకట్‌పల్లి	29 November 2017	None	Elevated
15	Balanagar	బాలానగర్	29 November 2017	None	Elevated
16	Moosapet	మూసాపేట్	29 November 2017	None	Elevated
17	Bharat Nagar	భరత్ నగర్	29 November 2017	Bharat Nagar	Elevated
18	Erragadda	ఎర్రగడ్డ	29 November 2017	None	Elevated
19	ESI Hospital	ఇ.ఎస్.ఐ హాస్పిటల్	29 November 2017	None	Elevated
20	S.R. Nagar	ఎస్ ఆర్ నగర్	29 November 2017	None	Elevated
21	Ameerpet	అమీర్‌పేట	29 November 2017	Blue Line	Elevated
22	Punjagutta	పంజాగుట్ట	24 September 2018	None	Elevated
23	Irrum Manzil	ఇరమ్ మంజిల్	24 September 2018	None	Elevated
24	Khairatabad	ఖైరతాబాద్	24 September 2018	Khairatabad	Elevated
25	Lakdi-ka-pul	లక్డీ-కా-పుల్	24 September 2018	Lakdikapul	Elevated
26	Assembly	అసెంబ్లీ	24 September 2018	None	Elevated
27	Nampally	నాంపల్లి	24 September 2018	Hyderabad Deccan	Elevated
28	Gandhi Bhavan	గాంధీ భవన్	24 September 2018	None	Elevated
29	Osmania Medical College	ఉస్మానియా మెడికల్ కాలేజీ	24 September 2018	None	Elevated
30	M.G. Bus Station	ఎం జి బస్ స్టేషన్	24 September 2018	Green Line; Mahatma Gandhi Bus Station	Elevated
31	Malakpet	మలక్ పేట	24 September 2018	Malakpet	Elevated
32	New Market	కొత్త మార్కెట్	24 September 2018	None	Elevated
33	Musarambagh	ముసారాంబాగ్	24 September 2018	None	Elevated
34	Dilsukhnagar	దిల్ సుఖ్ నగర్	24 September 2018	None	Elevated
35	Chaitanyapuri	చైతన్యపురి	24 September 2018	None	Elevated
36	Victoria Memorial	విక్టోరియా మెమోరియల్	24 September 2018	None	Elevated
37	LB Nagar	ఎల్ బి నగర్	24 September 2018	Airport shuttle Purple Line (proposed)	Elevated
38	Chintalkunta	చింతలకుంట	Proposed	None	Elevated
39	Vanasthalipuram	వనస్థలిపురం	Proposed	None	Elevated
40	Autonagar	ఆటోనగర్	Proposed	None	Elevated
41	Lecturers Colony	లెక్చరర్స్ కాలనీ	Proposed	None	Elevated
42	RTC Colony	ఆర్ టి సి కాలనీ	Proposed	None	Elevated
43	Hayatnagar	హయత్‌నగర్	Proposed	None	Elevated
