= Hyderabad Metro =

Rapid transit system in Hyderabad, India

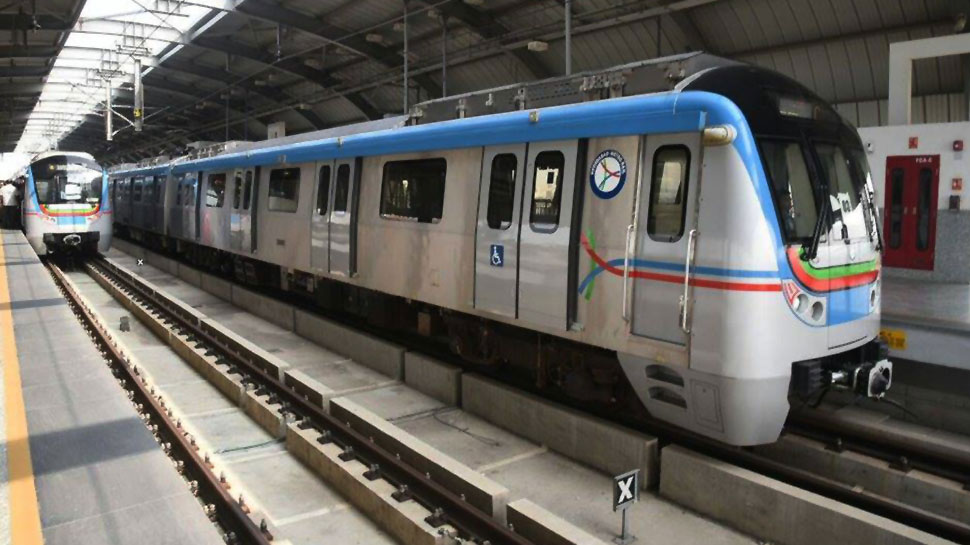

Overview
- Owner: Hyderabad Metro Rail Limited (HMRL)
- Area served: Hyderabad Metropolitan Region
- Locale: Hyderabad, Telangana
- Transit type: Rapid Transit
- Number of lines: 3
- Line number: Red Line; Blue Line; Green Line
- Number of stations: 57
- Daily ridership: 536,000 (July 2023)
- Annual ridership: 170 million
- Chief executive: K. Ramakrishna Rao (chairman); Sarfaraz Ahmed (managing director)
- Headquarters: Metro Rail Bhavan, Begumpet, Hyderabad 500003
- Website: ltmetro.com; hmrl.co.in

Operation
- Began operation: 29 November 2017; 8 years ago
- Operator: Keolis Hyderabad Mass Rapid Transit System
- Character: Elevated; Underground
- Rolling stock: Hyundai Rotem
- Train length: 3-car trains
- Headway: 3.5 - 7 minutes

Technical
- System length: 69.2 km (43.0 mi)
- No. of tracks: 2
- Track gauge: 1,435 mm (4 ft 8 1/2 in) standard gauge
- Minimum radius of curvature: 120 metres (390 ft)
- Electrification: 25 kV 50 Hz AC overhead catenary
- Average speed: 35 to 40 km/h (22 to 25 mph)
- Top speed: 80 km/h (50 mph)

The Hyderabad Metro is a rapid transit system, serving the city of Hyderabad, Telangana, India. The three lines are arranged in a secant model and contain 57 stations. It is funded by a public–private partnership (PPP), with the state government holding a minority equity stake. A special purpose vehicle company, L&T Metro Rail Hyderabad Limited (L&TMRHL), was established by the construction company Larsen & Toubro to develop the Hyderabad Metro rail project.

A 30-kilometre (19-mile) stretch from Miyapur to Nagole, with 24 stations, was inaugurated on 28 November 2017 by Prime Minister Narendra Modi. This was the longest rapid transit metro line opened in one go in India. It is estimated to cost ₹18,800 crore (US$2.0 billion). As of February 2020, about 490,000 people use the Metro per day. Trains are crowded during the morning and evening rush hours. A ladies only coach was introduced on all the trains from 7 May 2018. Post-COVID, 450,000 passengers were travelling on Hyderabad Metro daily on average by December 2022. On 3 July 2023, Hyderabad Metro Rail achieved a daily ridership of 0.51 million.

== History ==
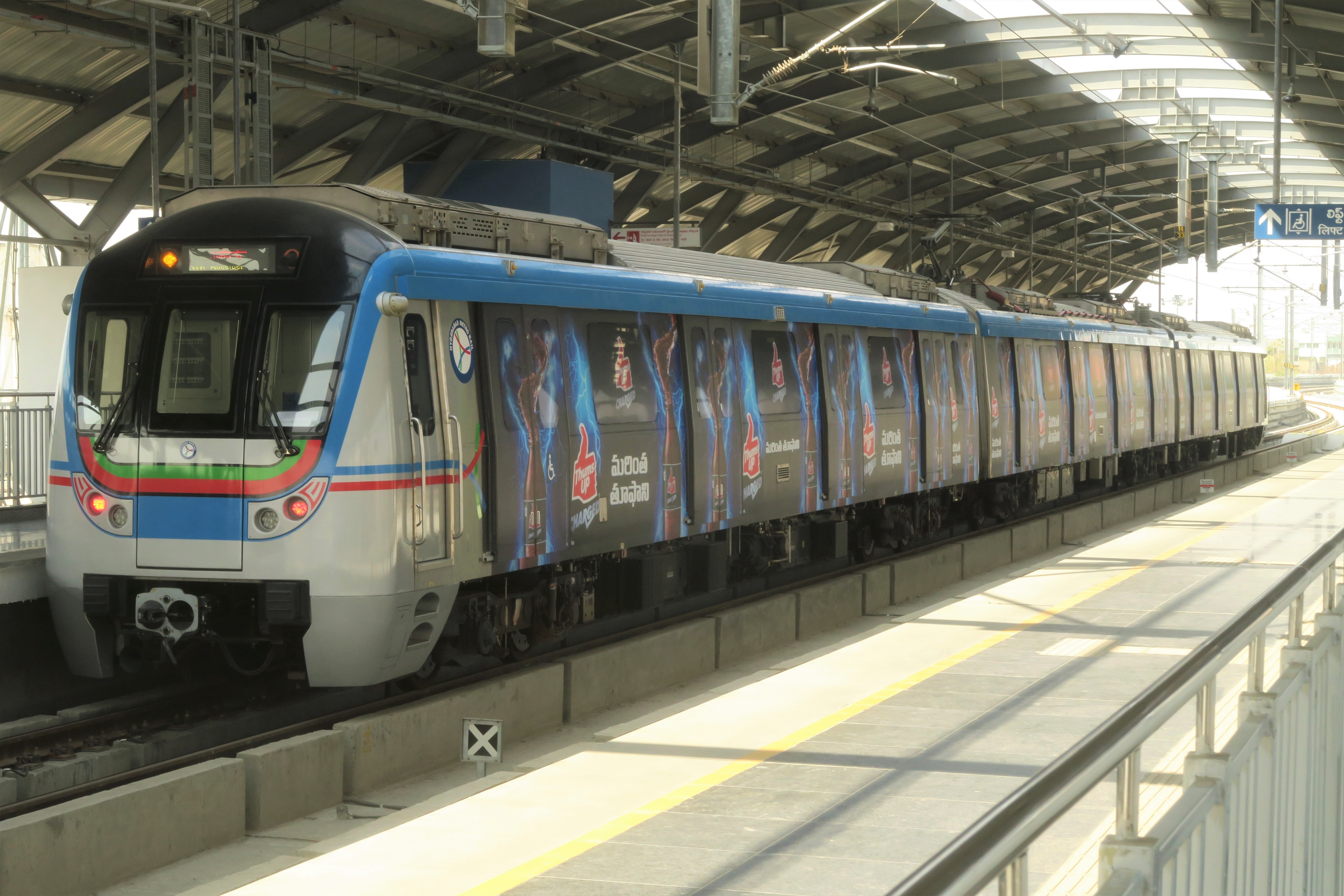
The Hyundai Rotem rolling stock of the Hyderabad metro

The Hyderabad Metro rail project was initiated by the NDA government in 2003. As Hyderabad continued to grow, the Multi-Modal Transport System (MMTS) had insufficient capacity for public transport, and the Union Ministry of Urban Development approved construction of the Hyderabad Metro rail project, directing the Delhi Metro Rail Corporation to conduct a survey of the proposed lines and to submit a Detailed Project Report (DPR). To meet rising public transport needs and mitigate growing road traffic in the twin cities of Hyderabad and Secunderabad, the state government and the South Central Railway jointly launched the MMTS in August 2003. The initial plan was for the Metro to connect with the existing MMTS to provide commuters with alternate modes of transport. Simultaneously, the proposals for taking up the construction of MMTS Phase II were also taken forward.

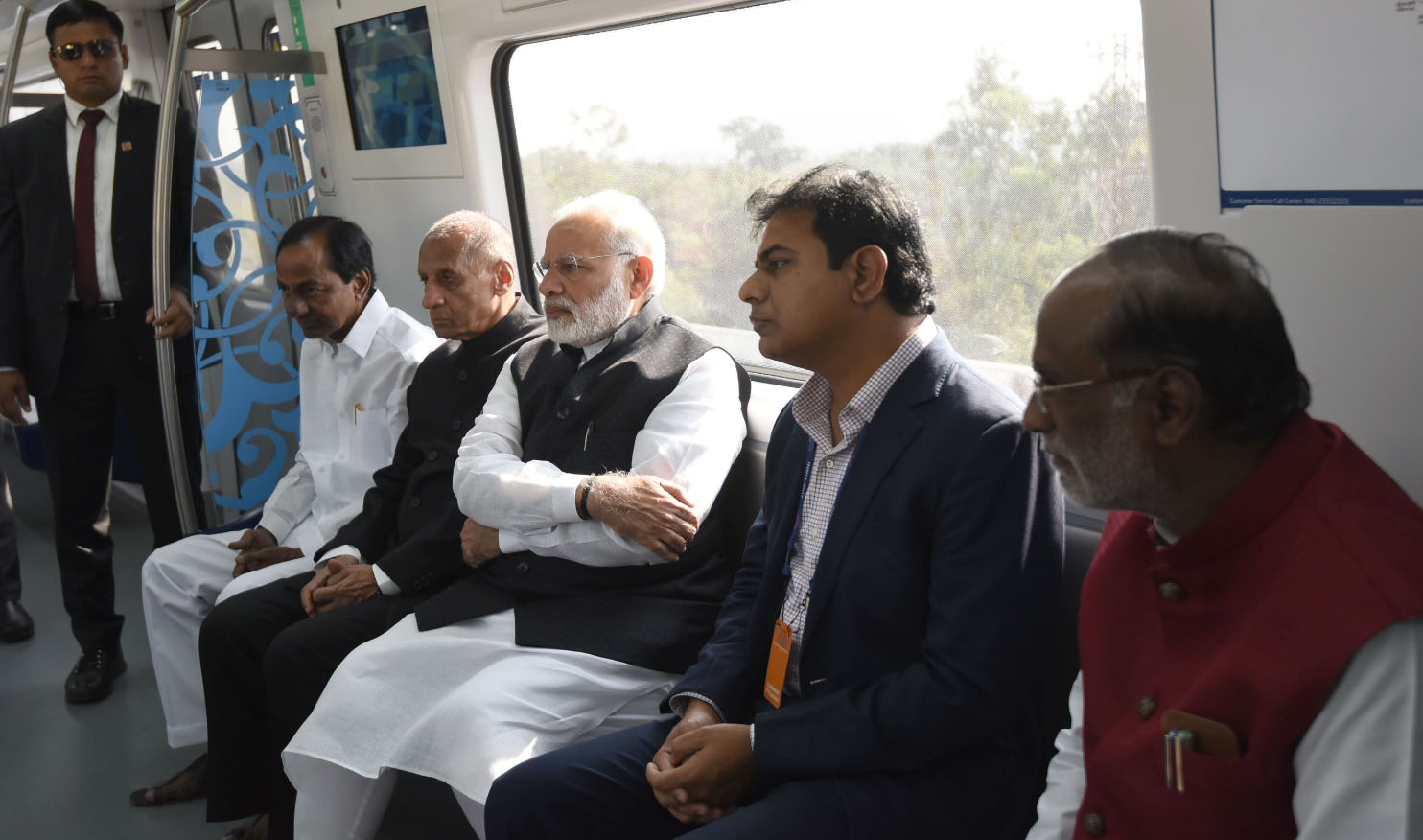
Prime Minister Narendra Modi taking a ride in the Hyderabad Metro in 2017

In 2007, N. V. S. Reddy was appointed managing director of Hyderabad Metro Rail Limited, and the same year, the Central Government approved financial assistance of ₹ 1639 crore under a Viability Gap Funding (VGF) scheme. The option of an underground metro system in Hyderabad was ruled out by L&T due to the presence of hard rocks, boulders and the topography of the soil in Hyderabad. Hyderabad Metro initially began under the Andhra Pradesh Municipal Tramways (Construction, Operation and Maintenance) Act, 2008, and later, it came under the Central Metro Act which permitted revision of fares. On 26 March 2018, the Government of Telangana announced that it would set up an SPV "Hyderabad Airport Metro Limited (HAML)", jointly promoted by HMRL and HMDA, to extend the Blue Line from Raidurg to Rajiv Gandhi International Airport, Shamshabad, under Phase II after the completion of Phase I in 2020.

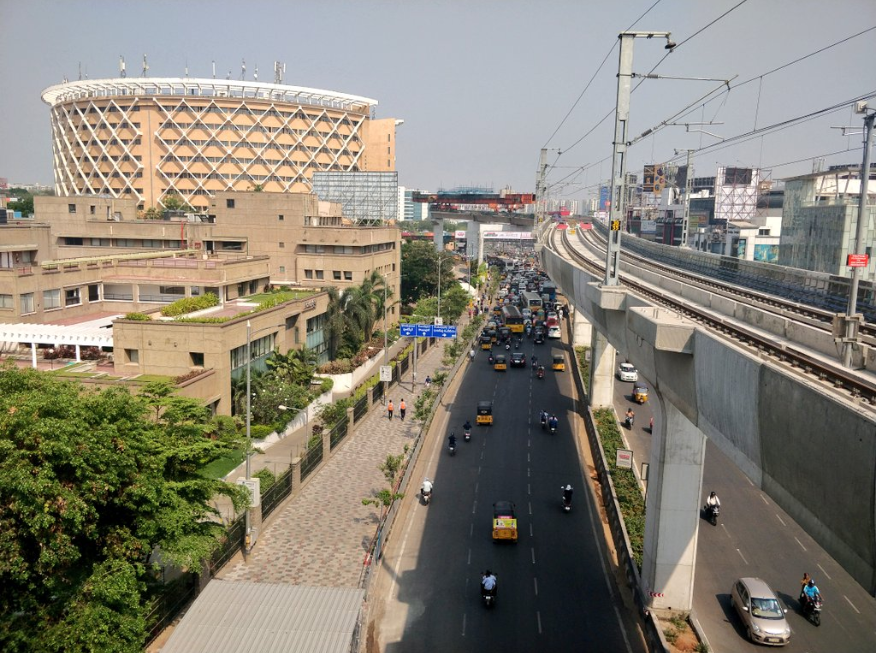
A view of the Hyderabad metro towards HITEC City

=== Initial bidding ===
The bidding process was completed by July 2008 and awarded to Maytas, which failed to achieve financial closure for the project as per schedule by March 2009.

=== Re-bidding ===
The state government cancelled the contract and called for a fresh rebidding for the project. In the July 2010 rebidding process, Larsen & Toubro (L&T) emerged as the lowest bidder for the ₹121.32 billion (US$1.3 billion) project. L&T came forward to take up the work for about ₹14.58 billion (US$160 million) as viability gap funding as against the sanctioned ₹48.53 billion (US$520 million). The Bharatiya Janata Party government proactively pursued the project, but it was delayed due to separate state agitation and later due to the apprehensions of the new government. A consortium of 10 banks led by State Bank of India sanctioned the entire debt requirement of the Hyderabad Metro project, which was the largest fund tie-up in India for a non-power infrastructure public-private partnership (PPP) project at that time.

=== Ownership transfer ===
Following the inauguration of the first stretch of Hyderabad Metro in November 2017, L&T requested the state government to provide approximately ₹3,756 crore to address cost overruns and delays in site handovers. By February 2020, cumulative losses had reportedly exceeded ₹5,000 crore. This was further worsened due to the high-interest loans taken under the public–private partnership model contributing to financial strain. The COVID-19 pandemic further impacted operations, as prolonged shutdowns resulted in an additional loss of around ₹382 crore. In response, L&T sought a bailout of ₹3,000 crore from the government, of which ₹1,000 crore was approved. L&T was also forced to restructure the debt in an effort to reduce its losses. Despite a gradual recovery in ridership, annual losses continued to rise reaching ₹625.88 crores in FY2025. The company also criticized that the state’s free bus travel scheme for women could affect metro ridership, although the metro simultaneously recorded peak passenger numbers.

Soon after, L&T informed the state government that it would not participate in Phase‑2 of the Hyderabad Metro project. The central government stated that if L&T opted out of Phase‑2, the state government would need to integrate Phase‑1 with the new phase. The company rejected the revenue-sharing model proposed by the state and began exploring options to exit the project entirely. In response, the state government proposed acquiring L&T’s stake for ₹15,000 crore, comprising the transfer of ₹13,000 crore in outstanding loans and a ₹2,000 crore payout, or alternatively allowing L&T to sell its stake privately with the government matching the highest bid. L&T countered with a demand of ₹20,000 crore, reflecting ₹7,000 crore in equity and incurred losses. The government rejected this valuation, noting that L&T had already received a ₹900 crore soft loan from the government and ₹2,200 crore from real estate sales. After several months of negotiations, the two parties reached a final agreement for the government to acquire L&T’s stake for ₹15,000 crore, including the loan transfer and payout. Ownership transfer shall be finalized by the end of March 2026.

== Construction Phases ==
=== Phase I ===
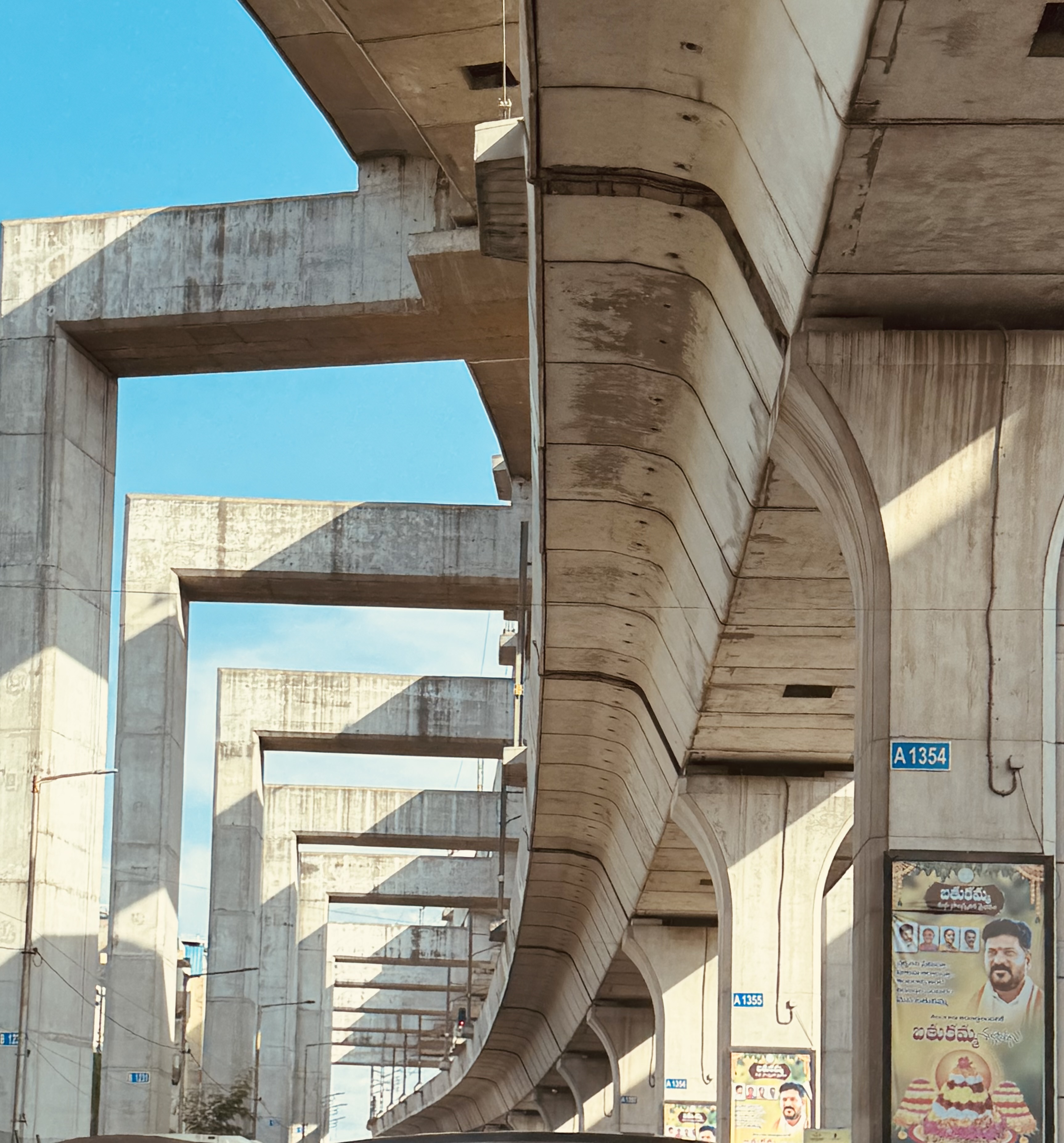
A low-angle view of the concrete viaduct, portal frames, and support beams of the Hyderabad Metro Red Line (Corridor I) near Putli Bowli, Koti, Hyderabad, India.

==== Phase I lines and sections ====
Phase-1 of Hyderabad Metro consists of three fully elevated corridors. Blue, Red, and Green, spanning a total length of 69.2km (41.76 mi) with 59 stations. The Blue and Red lines were inaugurated first in 2017, while the Green line opened later in 2020, completing the Phase-1 network. Initially, Phase-1 was planned to be around 72 kilometres (45 mi) with 64 stations, including an extension to Hyderabad’s Old City, but this section faced delays due to land acquisition and regulatory challenges and was subsequently deferred to Phase-2.

- Red Line - LB Nagar-Miyapur - 29 km (18 mi) & 27 stations
- Green Line - JBS–Falaknuma 11.2 km (7.0 mi) & 9 stations
- Blue Line - Nagole–Raidurg - 29 km (18 mi) & 23 stations

The first phase of the project was initially budgeted at ₹14,132 crore. With cost escalation, this was later revised to ₹15,957 crores in March 2012. This was once again revised to ₹18,800 crores in November 2017. The sudden increase in cost forced the state government to grant L&T a soft loan of ₹1,000 crores, with a plan for an additional ₹2,000 crores, which never materialized.

==== Construction ====
The project officially commenced with the groundbreaking ceremony on 26 April 2012, followed by the erection of the first pillars on the same day. Rail laying began in November 2013 between Nagole and Mettuguda, and the first train arrived from Korea in May 2014, with trial runs starting shortly thereafter. Safety approvals from the Commissioner of Metro Rail Safety were granted in stages, including the Miyapur–SR Nagar stretch in August 2016 and Nagole–Mettuguda in November 2017.

The first commercial operations of the Hyderabad Metro commenced with the inauguration of the Red Line (Miyapur–Ameerpet, 16 km) and the Blue Line (Ameerpet–Nagole) in November 2017. The Red Line was further extended from Ameerpet to LB Nagar on 24 September 2018. On the Blue Line, services were opened between Ameerpet and HITECH City on 20 March 2019, followed by the final extension to Raidurg on 29 November 2019.

By May 2019, construction of all 2,599 pillars (excluding the Old City stretch) had been completed. Phase 1 final extension and line, the Green Line was launched. The line running from Jubilee Bus Station (JBS) to Mahatma Gandhi Bus Station (MGBS) was inaugurated on 7 February 2020.

==== Old city metro line ====
Earlier in 2010, All India Majlis-e-Ittehadul Muslimeen suggested an alternate route for a metro in the old city through Purana Pul, Musallam Jung, Bahadurpura, Zoo Park, Tadbun junction, Kalapathar, Misrigunj and Shamsheergunj to Falaknuma. However, this 7.4 kilometres (4.6 mi) route was not accepted. The eastern parts of the old city have access to the metro via the Malakpet metro station. A 5.5 kilometres (3.4 mi)-long green line in the old city will pass through Dar-ul-Shifa, Salar Jung Museum, Charminar, Shah-Ali-Banda, Shamsheer Gunj, and Jungametta, and end at Falaknuma. In June 2022, Hyderabad Metro Rail started a fresh survey of the Old City route from MGBS for underground utilities. The survey is through the Lidar, Global Positioning System and Inertial measurement unit and the plan is to build the elevated line alongside Musi river and center of the road. In July 2023, Telangana Chief minister K. Chandrashekar Rao instructed the municipal administration and L&T chairman to take forward the metro project in old city. On 16 July 2023, Hyderabad Metro MD NVS Reddy states that preparatory work for taking up Metro Rail works in the old city had started and land acquisition notices for 1,100 affected properties would be issued in about a month. All five metro stations in the old city will have 120-feet wide roads under the viaduct. On 27 August 2023, Hyderabad Metro Rail Limited started a drone survey of the proposed rail alignment in the old city. In April 2026, HMRL fully acquired LTMRHL for a cost of ₹15,000 crore (US$1.6 billion), thereby taking over all day to day operations and outstanding debt of the system.

Phase 1 network
No.	Line Name	Terminals		Stations	Length	Line	Opening Date
1	Red	Miyapur	Ameerpet	11	13 km (8.1 mi)	Line I	29 November 2017
1	Red	Ameerpet	LB Nagar	16	16 km (9.9 mi)	Line I	24 September 2018
2	Green	JBS	MGBS	9	11.2 km (7.0 mi)	Line II	7 February 2020
3	Blue	Raidurg	Hitech City	1	1.5 km (0.93 mi)	Line III	29 November 2019
3	Blue	Hitech City	Ameerpet	8	10.5 km (6.5 mi)	Line III	20 March 2019
3	Blue	Ameerpet	Nagole	14	17 km (11 mi)	Line III	29 November 2017
Total				59	69.2 km (43.0 mi)		

=== Phase II ===
==== History ====
Following the inauguration of the Blue and Red Lines on 29 November 2017, Hyderabad Metro Rail Limited (HMRL) announced a concept plan for Phase 2, which was proposed to cover around 80 km across four corridors. The plan included extensions of the Red Line from Miyapur to Patancheruvu and from LB Nagar to Hayathnagar, along with a dedicated Airport Express Line and other potential routes.

Later the Delhi Metro Rail Corporation (DMRC) was entrusted to give a detailed project report (DPR) for Phase II. Metro Rail Phase II expansion plan is for about 63 km (39 mi), which includes providing a link to Shamshabad RGI Airport. In February 2020, Hyderabad Metro MD NVS Reddy said that three corridors were considered for phase 2. The DPR was submitted to the state government. In 2020, the project L&T Metro Rail Hyderabad faced significant operational losses, delaying phase 2. The state government revived the project in 2022 with a revised proposal that retained the Red Line extensions, added a Blue Line extension from Nagole to LB Nagar, and introduced a new Airport Express Line. As L&T was not willing to invest, the government prepared Detailed Project Reports (DPRs) and submitted them to the central government in November 2022 for approval. The Airport Express Line was separated from the larger Phase 2 proposal and tendered independently by the state. The remaining Phase 2 corridors were later rejected by the central government, which cited low ridership estimates. The decision was heavily criticized by the Telangana government as discriminatory when compared to metro approvals in other states.

Following the change of government after the 2023 Telangana Legislative Assembly election, the incoming administration placed the proposed Airport Express Line on hold before cancelling it altogether. The government subsequently announced a revised plan to implement Phase 2 of the Hyderabad Metro in two stages, referred to as Phase 2A and Phase 2B. Phase 2A consisted of five corridors, including extensions of all existing lines and the construction of a new Purple Line, and also proposed the system’s first underground station at Rajiv Gandhi International Airport. This phase was expected to add 76.2 km with 56 stations at an estimated cost of ₹24,269 crore. Phase 2A was cleared by the state government in November 2024 before being forwarded to the central government for approval. Phase 2B, announced later, involved three new corridors covering 86 km with 42 stations, with an estimated cost of ₹19,579 crore. The Phase was also approved by the state government on 5 June 2025 and was also forwarded to the central government for approval.

The state government announced that, since L&T was not interested in undertaking Phase 2, the project would be developed as a joint venture with the central government on a 50:50 cost-sharing basis. However, this arrangement ran into difficulties when the central government stated that the approval would be granted only if L&T consented to integrate Phase 2 with the existing metro operations. Despite the state government approving the project, the negotiations stalled with L&T. After several months of discussions, the state government and L&T reached an agreement under which the government would acquire L&T’s stake in the project for ₹15,000 crore, comprising the transfer of ₹13,000 crore in loans and a ₹2,000 crore payout. This would transition the project from a PPP to a State-Central government JV.

At the time of announcement of extension with Phase 2, a very critical route Tarnaka to ECIL was announced but after the change of Government, that route got cancelled. Trading of the ECIL metro that covers the most densely populated part of the city with the longer lines beyond airport with scarce population is highly criticised among the public.

==== Phase 2A Lines and Sections ====
- Red Line extension - LB Nagar – Hayathnagar – 7.1 km (4.4 mi) & 6 stations
- Red Line extension - Miyapur – Patancheruvu – 13.4 km (8.3 mi) & 10 stations
- Green Line extension - MGBS – Falaknuma – 7.5 km (4.7 mi) & 6 stations
- Blue Line extension - Raidurg – Kokapet Neopolis – 11.6 km (7.2 mi) & 10 stations
- Purple Line - Nagole – RGIA – 36.6 km (22.7 mi) & 24 stations

Phase 2A network
No.	Line Name	Terminals		Stations	Length	Line	Opening Date
1	Red	Patancheruvu	Miyapur	10	13.4 km (8.3 mi)	Line I extension	DPR Submitted Proposed
1	Red	LB Nagar	Hayathnagar	6	7.1 km (4.4 mi)	Line I extension	DPR Submitted Proposed
2	Green	MGBS	Chandryangutta	6	7.5 km (4.7 mi)	Line II extension	DPR Submitted Proposed
3	Blue	Kokapet Neopolis	Raidurg	10	11.6 km (7.2 mi)	Line III extension	DPR Submitted Proposed
4	Purple	Nagole	RGIA	24	36.6 km (22.7 mi)	Line IV	DPR Submitted Proposed
Total				56	76.2 km (47.3 mi)		

==== Phase 2B Lines and Sections ====
- Corridor I - JBS – Shamirpet – 22 km (14 mi) & 14 stations
- Corridor II - JBS – Medchal – 24 km (15 mi) & 18 stations
- Corridor III - RGIA – Future City – 40 km (25 mi) & 9 stations

Phase 2B network
No.	Line Name	Terminals		Stations	Length	Line	Opening Date
1	Corridor I	RGIA	Future City	9	40 km (24.8548 mi)	TBA	Proposed
2	Corridor II	JBS	Medchal	18	24 km (14.9129 mi)	TBA	Proposed
3	Corridor III	JBS	Shamirpet	14	22 km (13.6 mi)	TBA	Proposed
Total				42	86 km (53 mi)		

=== Summary ===
The construction work was undertaken in two phases. There are six stages of completion in Phase I.

Phase 1 network
No.	Line Name	Terminals		Stations	Length	Line	Opening Date
1	Red	Miyapur	Ameerpet	11	13 km (8.1 mi)	Line I	29 November 2017
1	Red	Ameerpet	LB Nagar	16	16 km (9.9 mi)	Line I	24 September 2018
2	Green	JBS	MGBS	9	11.2 km (7.0 mi)	Line II	7 February 2020
3	Blue	Raidurg	Hitech City	1	1.5 km (0.93 mi)	Line III	29 November 2019
3	Blue	Hitech City	Ameerpet	8	10.5 km (6.5 mi)	Line III	20 March 2019
3	Blue	Ameerpet	Nagole	14	17 km (11 mi)	Line III	29 November 2017
Total				59	69.2 km (43.0 mi)		
Phase 2A network
No.	Line Name	Terminals		Stations	Length	Line	Opening Date
1	Red	Patancheruvu	Miyapur	10	13.4 km (8.3 mi)	Line I extension	Centre Approved
1	Red	LB Nagar	Hayathnagar	6	7.1 km (4.4 mi)	Line I extension	Centre Approved
2	Green	MGBS	Chandryangutta	6	7.5 km (4.7 mi)	Line II extension	Centre Approved
3	Blue	Kokapet Neopolis	Raidurg	10	11.6 km (7.2 mi)	Line III extension	Centre Approved
4	Purple	Nagole	RGIA	24	36.6 km (22.7 mi)	Line IV	Centre Approved
Total				56	76.2 km (47.3 mi)		
Phase 2B network
No.	Line Name	Terminals		Stations	Length	Line	Opening Date
7	Corridor I	RGIA	Future City	9	40 km (24.8548 mi)	TBA	Proposed
8	Corridor II	JBS	Medchal	18	24 km (14.9129 mi)	TBA	Proposed
9	Corridor III	JBS	Shamirpet	14	22 km (13.6 mi)	TBA	Proposed
Total				42	86 km (53 mi)		

== Network ==
Currently, the Hyderabad Metro has 57 stations. Phase I of the Hyderabad metro has 64 stations; they have escalators and elevators to reach the stations, announcement boards and electronic display systems. The stations also have service roads underneath them to for other public transportation systems to drop-off and pick-up passengers. The signboards of Hyderabad Metro are displayed in Telugu, English, Hindi and Urdu at metro stations. All stations of Hyderabad Metro Rail are equipped with tactile pathway right from street level till the platform level along with elevator buttons equipped with Braille, for providing a barrier less navigation for the visually impaired commuters.

Otis Elevator Company supplied and maintains the 670 elevators in use on the system. The numbering of metro pillars of Hyderabad Metro is alpha-numeric with corridor I (Miyapur-LB Nagar) designated as ‘A’, corridor II (JBS-Falaknuma) designated as ‘B’ and corridor III (Nagole-Raidurg) designated as ‘C’. The numbering begins from the Point of Beginning (POB) corridor-wise like the pier numbers on corridor I is C1 near Nagole bridge (corridor beginning), C296 near Mettuguda, C583 near Begumpet, C623 near Ameerpet, C1001 near Hitec city, and C1052 near Riadurg. Any future expansion of corridors would be having D, E, F etc. The metro Rail pillars are linked them with Google Maps and GPS (Global Position System).

In May 2018, L&T Metro Rail signed a contract with Powergrid Corporation of India to install electric vehicle charging facilities at all metro stations beginning with Miyapur and Dr. B R Ambedkar Balanagar stations. L&THMRL has set up free wifi access units for commuters at Miyapur, Ameerpet and Nagole metro stations, in association with ACT Fibernet, as part of a pilot project.

Hyderabad Metro
No.	Line Name	First Operation	Last Extension	Stations	Length	Terminals		Frequency	
No.	Line Name	First Operation	Last Extension	Stations	Length	Terminals		Peak hours	Non-peak hours
1	Red Line	29 November 2017	24 September 2018	27	29 km (18 mi)	Miyapur	LB Nagar	4.5 minutes	10 minutes
2	Blue Line	29 November 2017	29 November 2019	23	29 km (18 mi)	Raidurg	Nagole	4.5 Minutes	10 Minutes
3	Green Line	7 February 2020		9	11.2 km (7.0 mi)	JBS PG	MGBS	12 Minutes	
Total				59	69.2 km				

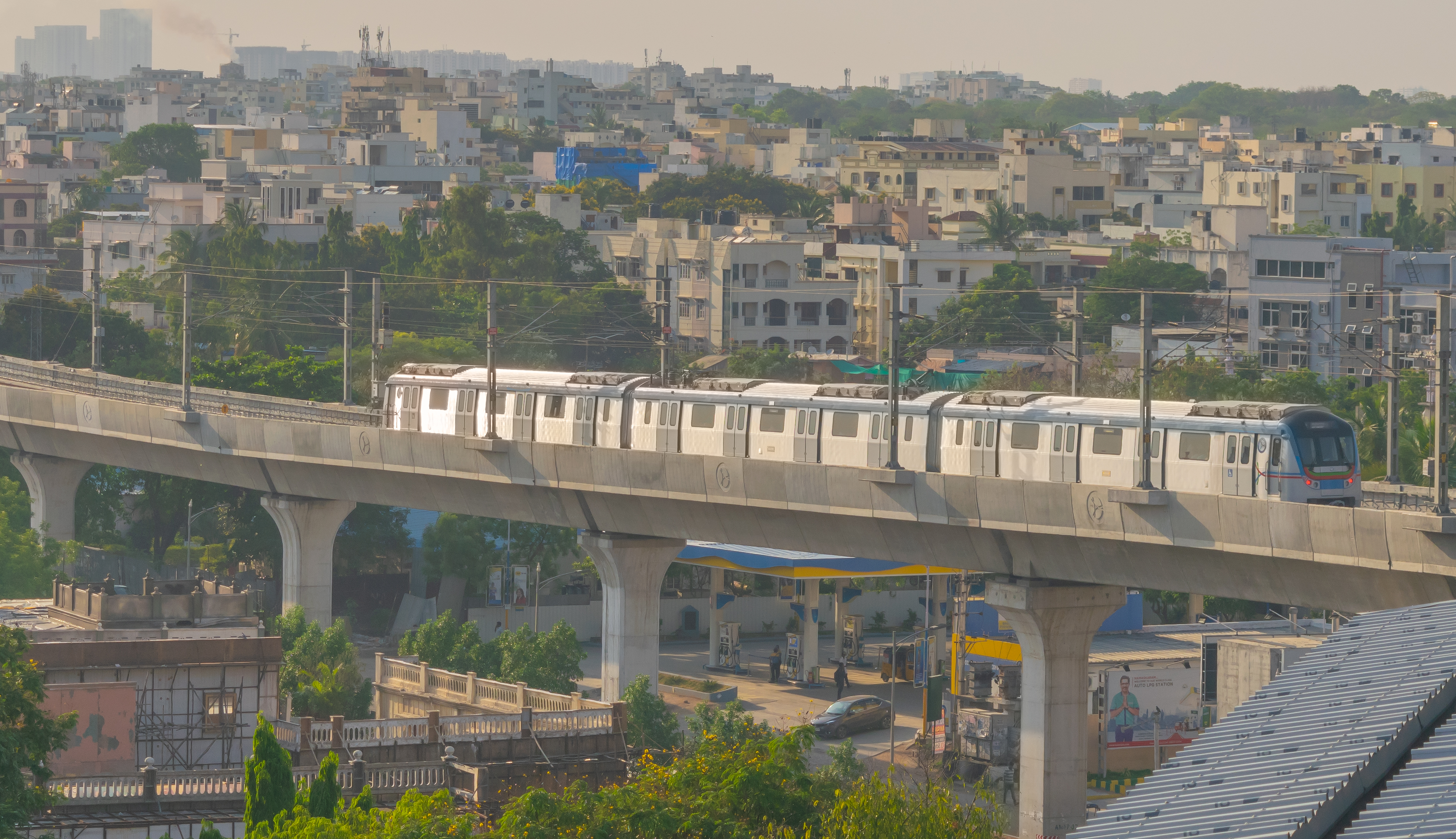
Blue Line of Hyderabad Metro

== Finances ==
The Hyderabad metro is a public–private partnership project. The total cost of this transport systems is US$ 3.07 billion, which is shared by Larsen & Toubro (90%) and the Government of Telangana (10%). In July 2022, L&T Metro Rail Hyderabad Limited came up with a unique concept of 'Office Bubbles' wherein it will offer remote, co-working spaces as part of its transit-oriented development (ToD). The L&T Hyderabad Metro organisation is offering 1,750 sq. ft. space with two units each in 49 Metro stations across the three corridors and another 5,000-30,000 sq. ft. in eight other Metro stations. Focusing on IT companies, the Office Bubbles concept offers the spoke–hub distribution paradigm.

In Hyderabad Metro, 40 per cent of the retail space was sold even before the metro stations were built to generate non-fare revenue. L&TMRHL built real- estate projects like Next Galleria malls in Panjagutta, Irrum Manzil, Hitech City and Musarambagh with skywalks, for generating non-fare revenues under transit-oriented development. In 2019, Hyderabad Metro started a semi-naming policy of metro stations, awarded through an open e-tendering process, to generate non-fare revenues.

== Depots ==
Hyderabad Metro currently has two operational depots. Miyapur and Uppal's depot land are 100 acres each. The proposed Falaknuma depot will be constructed on 17 acres.

Hyderabad Metro
Depots
Line no.	Line name	Number of depots	Location	Opening date
1	Red Line	1	Miyapur Depot, near Calvary Temple, Nadigada Tanda, Miyapur, Hyderabad, Telangana	28 November 2017
2	Blue Line	1	Uppal Metro Depot, Nagole Rd, Laxmi Narayan Nagar Colony, Uppal, Hyderabad, Telangana	28 November 2017
3	Green Line	1	Falaknuma	Yet to start construction

== Ridership ==
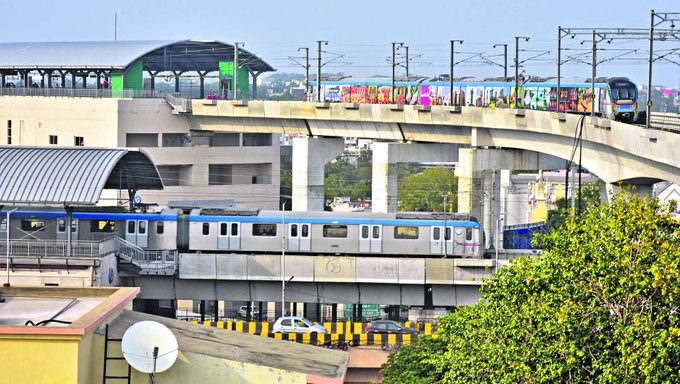
JBS Parade Ground metro station

The Metro has opened to overwhelming response, with over 200,000 people using it on day one. On the first Sunday of operations, the Metro was used by 240,000 people. As of 2020, the daily ridership was about 490,000. Although there were hiccups in the beginning of operations in 2017, with a meager ridership of 100,000 per day, since opening the new lines to LB Nagar and Hi-Tech city in 2018–19, ridership has surged and quickly reached milestones from 2 to 4 lakhs.

Trains are initially being operated at a frequency of 3 minutes in extreme peak hours, every 5 minutes in peak hours (between Miyapur-LB Nagar), and 4 minutes in peak hours (between Hi-Tec City/ Ameerpet-Nagole), though the maximum achievable frequency is every 90 seconds. Three-car trains are being used, though it is planned to use six-car trains in the future.

In December 2017, Hyderabad Metro Rail launched its mobile app, TSavaari. Hyderabad Metro timings are available on the app. Ola Cabs and Uber tied up their services with the app.

In May 2022, Hyderabad Metro Managing Director N.V.S. Reddy ruled out the possibility of attaching one single or double coach to three-coach train sets. Each three-coach train can take between 900-1,000 passengers per trip, and the project has been envisaged in such a manner that another three-coach set rake can be attached to make them into six-coach trains, with the stations/depots also already planned for the increased length of the trains. L&T Metro Rail has been using 53 train sets of three coaches each, with four three-coach sets under repair or maintenance undertaken using special software based on the Internet of Things.

Hyderabad Metro Rail crossed the 100 million cumulative ridership milestone in just 671 days.

In February 2023, Hyderabad Metro announced that folding cycles are allowed on Metro, which are of the size of a 40 kg bag, but only during non-peak hours.

== Last-mile connectivity ==
In order to enhance first and last mile connectivity of Hyderabad Metro Rail, Svida Mobility Pvt Ltd, an urban mobility services startup, signed a memorandum of understanding with the L&T Metro Rail Hyderabad Limited (L&TMRHL) with plans to scale up their feeder vehicle services. Svida offers services via a robust AI-enabled tech platform, which provides the booking of feeder vehicles. Svida Mobility Pvt Ltd has been an L&TMRHL authorised feeder service provider since 2019. The first and last mile connectivity routes, across seven metro stations - Raidurg, Parade ground, Mettuguda, LB Nagar, Uppal, KPHB and Miyapur - use e-Autos and Tata wingers. On 21 April 2022, Hyderabad Metro launched its electric auto services in collaboration with the AI-enabled ride-hailing mobility platform MetroRide. The services were launched at two metro stations - Parade Grounds and Raidurg Stations.

== Cost ==
The initial official estimated cost of the 72 km long metro project stood at ₹14,132 crore (US$1.5 billion). The state government decided to bear 10% of the cost, while L&T was to bear the remaining 90%. The construction work which was supposed to commence on 3 March 2011 commenced in 2012. In March 2012, the cost of the project was revised upwards to ₹15,957 crore (US$1.7 billion). This was further revised upwards to ₹18,800 crore (equivalent to ₹290 billion or US$3.1 billion in 2026) in November 2017.

In April 2026, HMRL fully acquired LTMRHL for a cost of ₹15,000 crore (US$1.6 billion), thereby taking over all day to day operations and outstanding debt of the system.

== Infrastructure ==
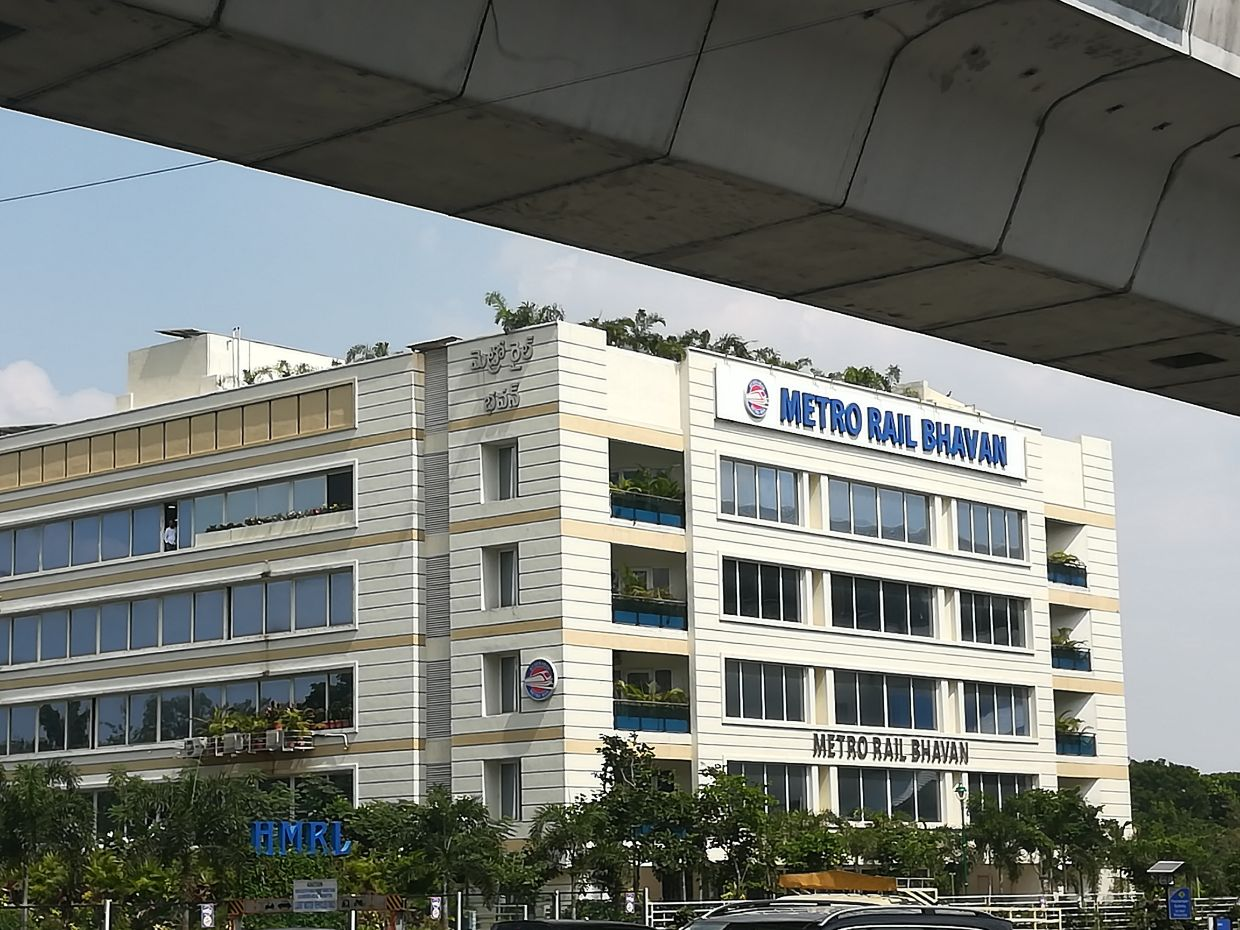
Hyderabad Metro Rail Bhavan

The 71.3 km standard-gauge network will feature ballastless track throughout and will be electrified at 25 kV AC 50 Hz. An operations control centre and depot are constructed at Uppal. At some places, a flyover, underpass and metro have been constructed at the same place, as part of a strategic road development plan (SRDP).

=== CBTC technology ===
At the end of 2012, L&T Metro Rail awarded Thales a ₹7.4 billion ($US 134m) contract to provide CBTC and integrated telecommunications and supervision systems on all three lines. Thales Group supplied its SelTrac communications-based train control (CBTC) technology, and trains initially run in automatic train operation mode with minimum headways of 90 seconds, although the system will support eventual migration to unattended train operation (UTO).

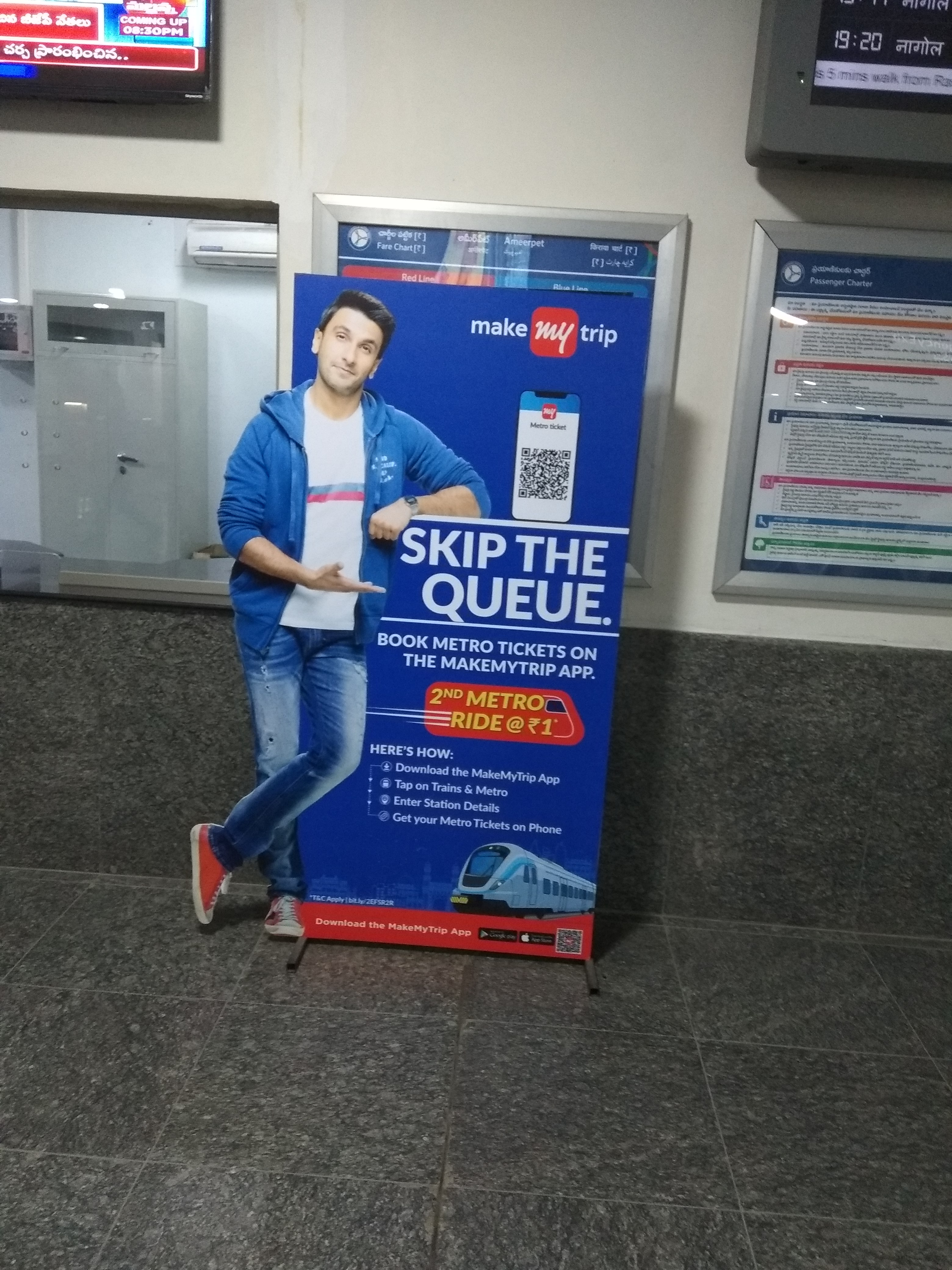
Hyderabad metro ticket online booking through MakeMyTrip and Goibibo.

=== Rolling stock ===
On 12 September 2012, Larsen and Toubro Metro Rail Hyderabad Ltd (LTMRHL) announced that it had awarded tender for supply of rolling stock to Hyundai Rotem. The ₹18 billion (US$190 million) tender is for 57 trains consisting of 171 cars which will be delivered in phases at least nine months before the commencement of each stage. On 2 October 2013, LTMRHL unveiled its train car for Hyderabad Metro. A model coach which is half the size of the actual coach was on public display at Necklace Road on the banks of Hussain Sagar in the heart of Hyderabad. The trains will be 3.2m wide and 4m high. There will be four doors on both sides of each coach.

On 10 April 2014, the first metro train for HMR rolled out of Hyundai Rotem factory at Changwon in South Korea, and reached Hyderabad in May 2014.

On 31 December 2014, Hyderabad Metro Rail successfully conducted a training run in Automatic Train Operation (ATO) mode for the first time between Nagole and Mettuguda.

In February 2022, Hyderabad Metro became India's first metro rail to introduce ozone-based sanitisation of its train coaches.

Hyderabad Metro rakes regenerate power using a regenerative braking system.

=== Ticketing and recharge ===
The L&T Hyderabad project has an automated ticketing system with features such as contactless smart card based ticketing, slim automatic gates, payment by cash and credit/debit card, passenger operated ticket vending machine and provision of common ticketing system. It also has a provision of NFC-based technology to enable usage of mobile phones for fare payments, to avoid long queues. The Hyderabad Metro Rail smart card acts as a virtual wallet that facilitates seamless travel. A smart card can be purchased from a ticketing office at any Hyderabad Metro station or through the TSavaari app. A smart card can be recharged for a minimum of ₹ 50 and a maximum of ₹ 3000. It can be recharged through the TSavaari app, the HMR passenger website, or the Paytm app. There is a 10% discount on all trips paid for via the smart card. In December 2019, Hyderabad Metro started a cashless QR code payment option for e-tickets through MakeMyTrip and Goibibo. In October 2022, Hyderabad Metro became the first metro rail in the country to launch an end-to-end fully digital payment-enabled metro ticket booking through the WhatsApp e-ticketing facility. In November 2024, Hyderabad Metro became the first metro rail in the country to launch Digital Ticketing through RCS e-Ticketing facility. This is made available through Google Messages from their official number (+91 8341146468).

Samsung Data Systems India, a subsidiary of the South Korean firm Samsung, was awarded the automatic fare collection system package for the L&T Metro rail project. The package involves design, manufacture, supply, installation, testing and commissioning of the system. Official ticket prices were announced on 25 November 2017. The base fare is ₹10 for up to 2 km.

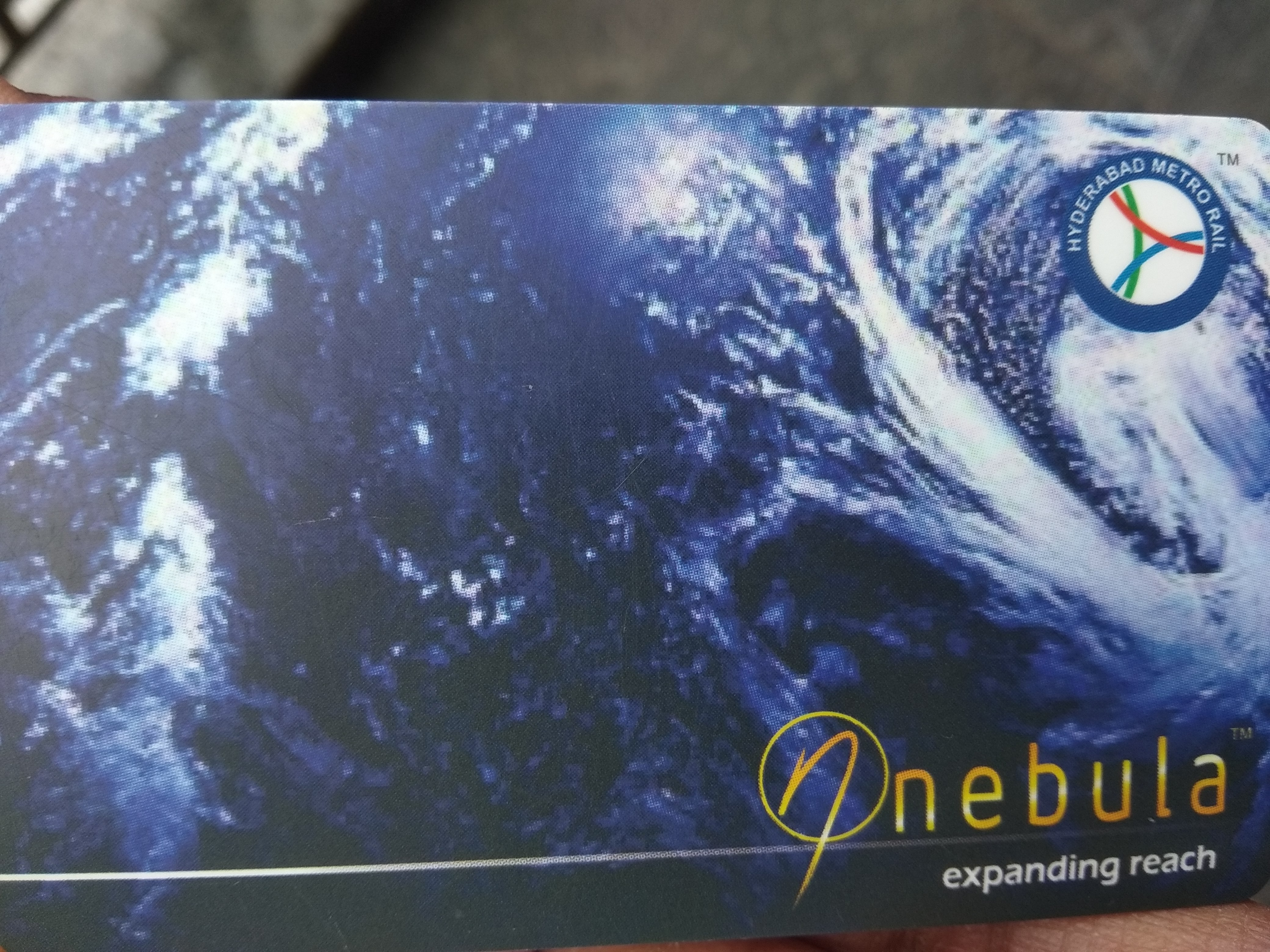
Hyderabad Metro Nebula smart card

Slab	Distance (km)	Metro fare (₹)
1	0 - 2	11
2	2 - 4	17
3	4 - 6	28
4	6 - 9	37
5	9 - 12	47
6	12 - 15	51
7	15 - 18	56
8	18 - 21	61
9	21 - 24	65
10	> 24	69

=== Sanitation and maintenance ===
In 2023, the Hyderabad Metro implemented a system to collect user charges at stations with high passenger traffic to ensure effective maintenance of public washrooms. The management of these facilities was assigned to Sulabh International, a well-known sanitation organization. Under this arrangement, commuters are charged a nominal fee of Rs 2 for using urinals and Rs 5 for accessing toilets.

== Awards and nominations ==
The HMR project was showcased as one of the top 100 strategic global infrastructure projects at the Global Infrastructure Leadership Forum held in New York during February–March 2013.

L&T Metro Rail Hyderabad Limited (LTMRHL) was conferred the SAP ACE Award 2015 in the 'Strategic HR and Talent Management' category.

In 2018 the Rasoolpura, Paradise and Prakash Nagar Metro stations were awarded the Indian Green Building Council's (IGBC) Green MRTS Platinum Award.

Hyderabad Metro was adjudged as the Best Urban Mass Transit Project by the Government of India in November 2018.

In October 2022, three metro stations of Hyderabad Metro- Durgam Cheruvu, Punjagutta and LB Nagar were awarded Indian Green Building Council (IGBC) Green MRTS Certification with the highest platinum rating under elevated stations category. With this, Hyderabad Metro Rail has 23 metro stations certified with the IGBC Platinum rating.

In March 2024, a study done by Indian School of Business team on Hyderabad Metro Rail project execution was published as a case study in Stanford University for the benefit of management practitioners.

== In popular culture ==
- The 2018 Telugu film Devadas, starring Nani and Rashmika Mandanna, was the first film to be shot in Hyderabad Metro.
- Some scenes of the 2021 Telugu films Vakeel Saab, starring Pawan Kalyan and Nivetha Thomas, and Ek Mini Katha, starring Santosh Shoban and Kavya Thapar, were shot in Hyderabad Metro.
- In June 2022, a scene from the upcoming Indian science fiction film Kalki 2898 AD, starring Amitabh Bachchan, was shot at Raidurg Metro Station. Some scenes of the film 18 Pages were also shot in Hyderabad Metro.
- Many scenes of the 2023 Hindi film 8 A.M. Metro and the 2023 Telugu film Kushi were shot in Hyderabad Metro.
- Many scenes from the movie Single were shot in hyderabad metro
- Hyderabad Metro introduced a group of 20 transgender personnel into its security workforce following a period of specialized training, marking a notable milestone for the city’s public transit system.

== See also ==
- Urban rail transit in India
- Transport in Hyderabad
- Hyderabad Multi-Modal Transport System
- Rajiv Gandhi International Airport
- Namma Metro
- List of metro systems
