= LB Nagar metro station =

Metro station in Hyderabad, India

LB Nagar
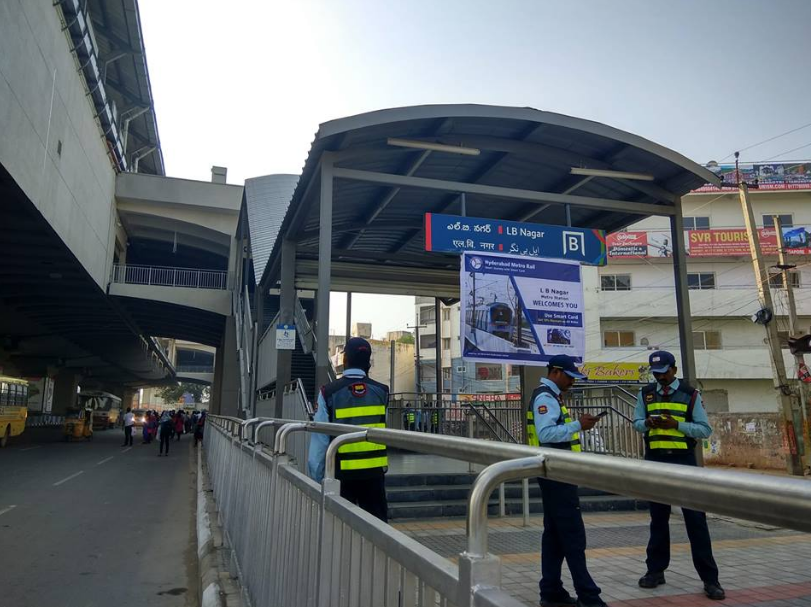

General information
- Location: L. B. Nagar
- Coordinates: 17.348426°N 78.550959°E
- System: Hyderabad Metro station
- Line: Red Line
- Platforms: 2
- Tracks: 2

Construction
- Structure type: Elevated

History
- Opened: 24 September 2018; 8 years ago

Services
Preceding station	Hyderabad Metro	Following station
Victoria Memorial towards Miyapur	Red Line	Terminus
Location

LB Nagar is a metro station located on the Red Line of the Hyderabad Metro. It is part of Corridor I of Hyderabad metro starting from Miyapur and was opened to public on 24 September 2018. Five shuttle bus services from L.B. Nagar Metro Station will carry tourists to Ramoji Film City every day. Passengers can visit all miles app or LB Nagar station for more details. This metro station is recording one of the highest footfalls daily. In September 2023, a new escalator at Arm-B of the LB Nagar metro station was opened.

The catchment areas of LB Nagar Metro station are major residential hubs of Hayathnagar, Vanasthalipuram, and BN Reddy Nagar to Mansoorabad. In October 2022, LB Nagar metro station was awarded Indian Green Building Council (IGBC) Green MRTS Certification with the highest platinum rating under the elevated stations category. In June 2023, Vasavi Group became the sponsor of the LB Nagar metro station, under semi-naming policy of Hyderabad metro to generate non-fare revenues. The largest gated community project in South India — Ananda Nilayam — is located opposite the LB Nagar Metro Station.

== Station layout ==
Street Level
This is the first level where passengers may park their vehicles and view the local area map.

Concourse level
Ticketing office or Ticket Vending Machines (TVMs) is located here. Retail outlets and other facilities like washrooms, ATMs, first aid, etc., will be available in this area.

Platform level
This layer consists of two platforms. Trains takes passengers from this level.

G	Street level	Exit/Entrance
L1	Mezzanine	Fare control, station agent, Metro Card vending machines, crossover
L2	Side platform | Doors will open on the left
L2	Platform 1 Southbound	Towards → Train Terminate Here
L2	Platform 2 Northbound	Towards ← Miyapur next station is Victoria Memorial
L2	Side platform | Doors will open on the left
L2
