= Miyapur metro station =

Metro station in Hyderabad, India

Miyapur
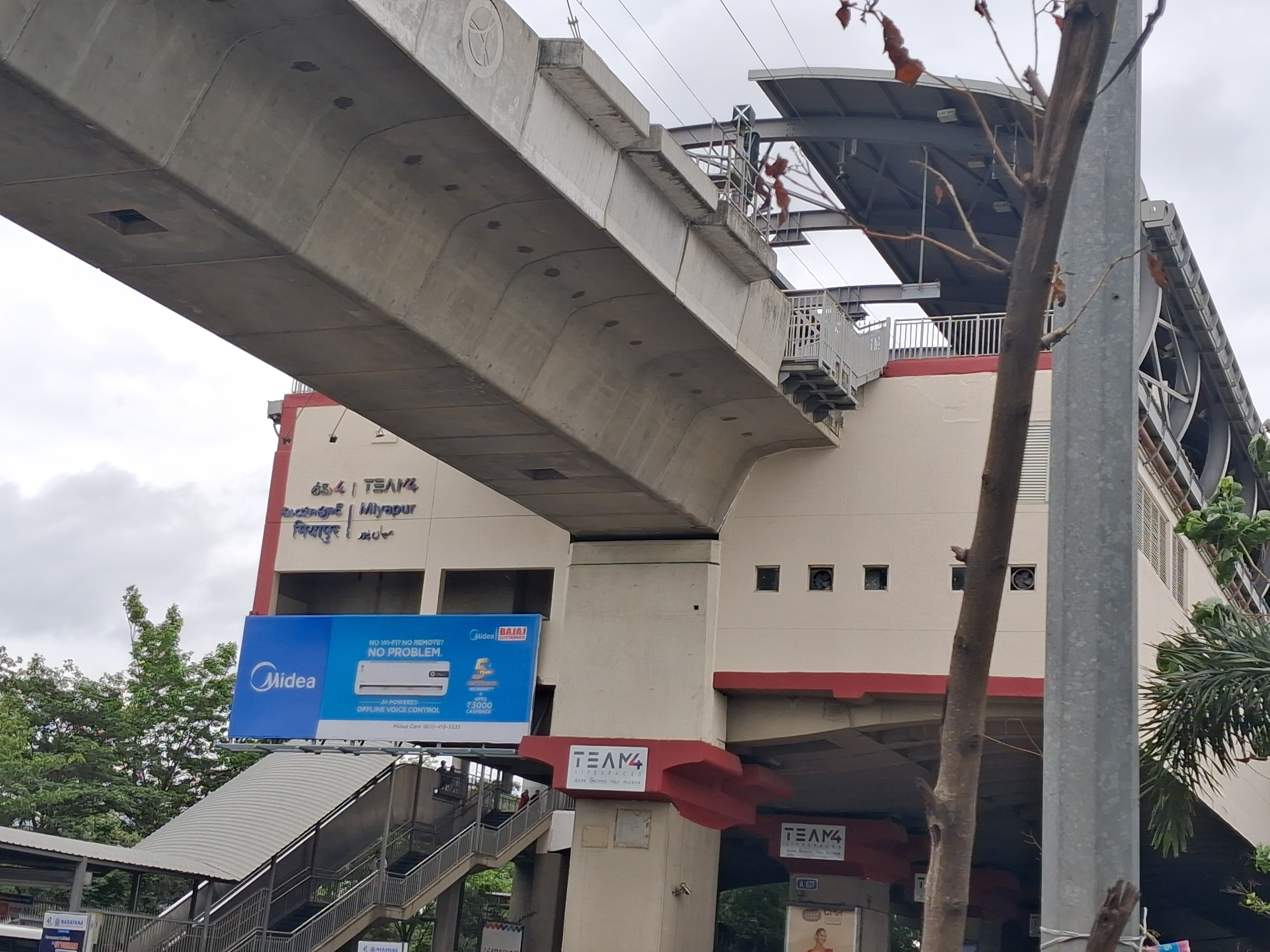
- Team4- Miyapur metro station

General information
- Location: Near Kalvari Temple, Nadigada Tanda, Miyapur, Hyderabad, Telangana 500049.
- Coordinates: 17.4964°N 78.3731°E
- System: Hyderabad Metro station
- Owner: Larsen & Toubro (90%); Government of Telangana (10%)
- Operator: Hyderabad Metro Rail Ltd.
- Line: Red Line
- Platforms: 2 (2 side platform)
- Tracks: 2

Construction
- Structure type: Elevated, Double-track
- Parking: Available
- Cycle facilities: Available
- Accessible: Disabled access

Other information
- Status: Staffed, Operational

History
- Opened: 29 November 2017; 8 years ago

Passengers
- 2018: 17,180 Daily Average
- Rank: 2 out of 40

Services
Preceding station	Hyderabad Metro	Following station
Terminus	Red Line	JNTU College towards LB Nagar
Track layout
Location
- Location within Hyderabad

The Miyapur Metro Station is located on the Red Line of the Hyderabad Metro. The Miyapur Metro Station is terminal point of Corridor I. L&THMRL has set up free wifi access units for commuters at Miyapur metro station, in association with ACT Fibernet, as part of a pilot project.

== History ==
It was opened on 29 November 2017 by Prime Minister Narendra Modi. In 2026, Miyapur Metro Station started a branding initiative, under semi-naming policy of Hyderabad metro to generate non-fare revenues, in which the developer Team4 Life Spaces acquired the corporate naming rights for the metro station.

== Station ==
Miyapur elevated metro station situated on the Red Line of Hyderabad Metro.

=== Facilities ===
The stations have staircases, elevators and escalators from the street level to the platform level which provide easy and comfortable access. Also, operation panels inside the elevators are installed at a level that can be conveniently operated by all passengers, including disabled and elderly citizens.

=== Station layout ===
Street Level
This is the first level where passengers may park their vehicles and view the local area map.

Concourse level
Ticketing office or Ticket Vending Machines (TVMs) is located here. Retail outlets and other facilities like washrooms, ATMs, first aid, etc., will be available in this area.

Platform level
This layer consists of two platforms. Trains takes passengers from this level.

L1; Platforms	Side platform, doors will open on the left
L1; Platforms	Platform 1	Red Line toward LB Nagar (JNTU College) →
L1; Platforms	Platform 2	← Red Line termination platform
L1; Platforms	Side platform, doors will open on the left
M	Mezzanine	Fare control, station agent, Metro Card vending machines, crossover
G	Street level	Exit/Entrance

== Connections ==
=== Bus ===
Telangana State Road Transport Corporation bus routes number 16A/219, 18/219, 19/224, 19K/224, 19M/218, 19M/224, 22/219L, 24S/219, 31X, 113EL, 113K/255L, 113K/L, 113KL, 195, 195D, 218, 218/19M, 218C, 218D, 218D/L, 218L, 218L/V, 219, 219/229, 223JG, 224/205F, 224/226, 225L, 225L/299, 225L/V, 226, 226A, 226L/229 serves the station .

== Gallery ==
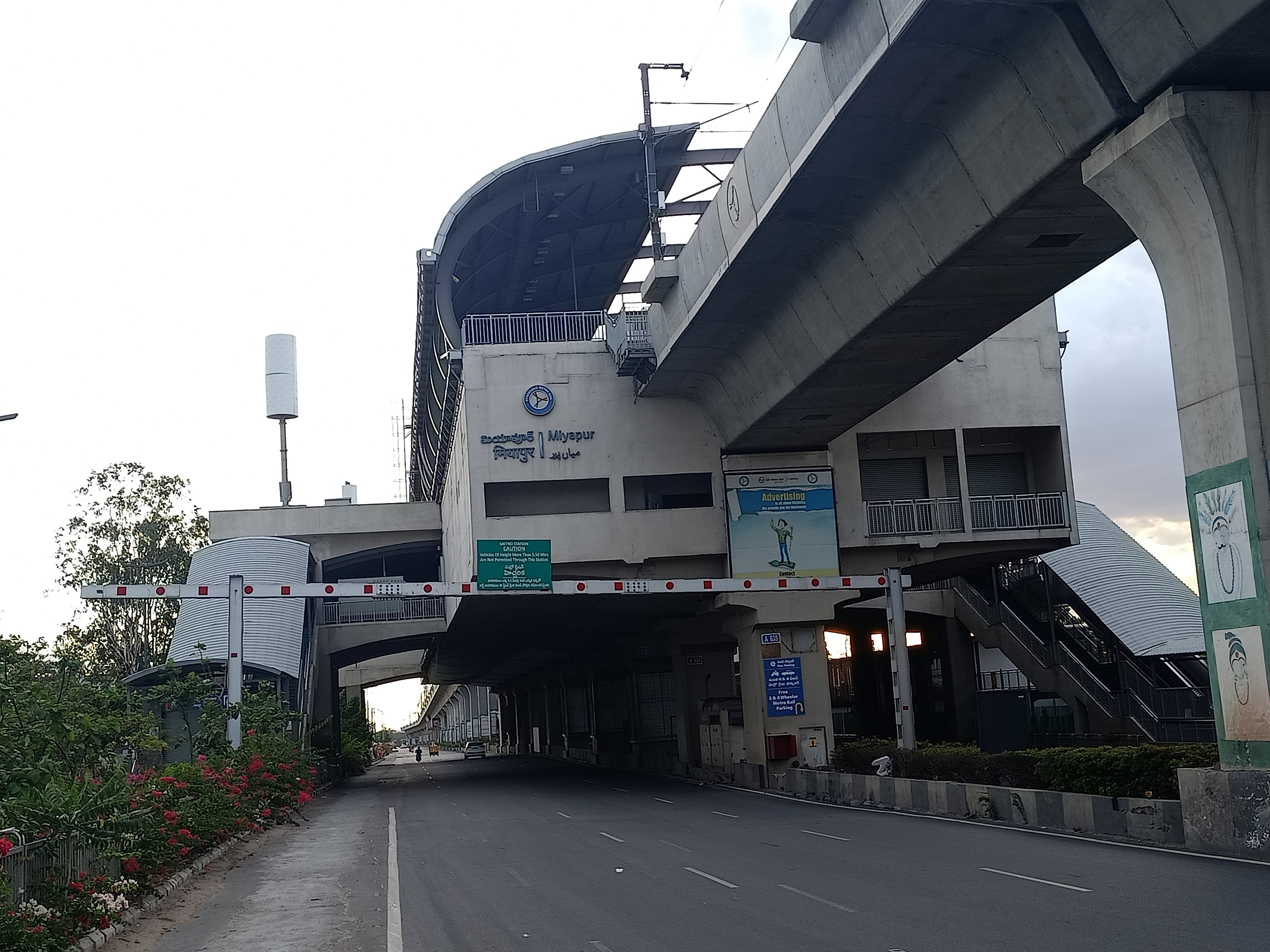
Front view from Miyapur X roads side

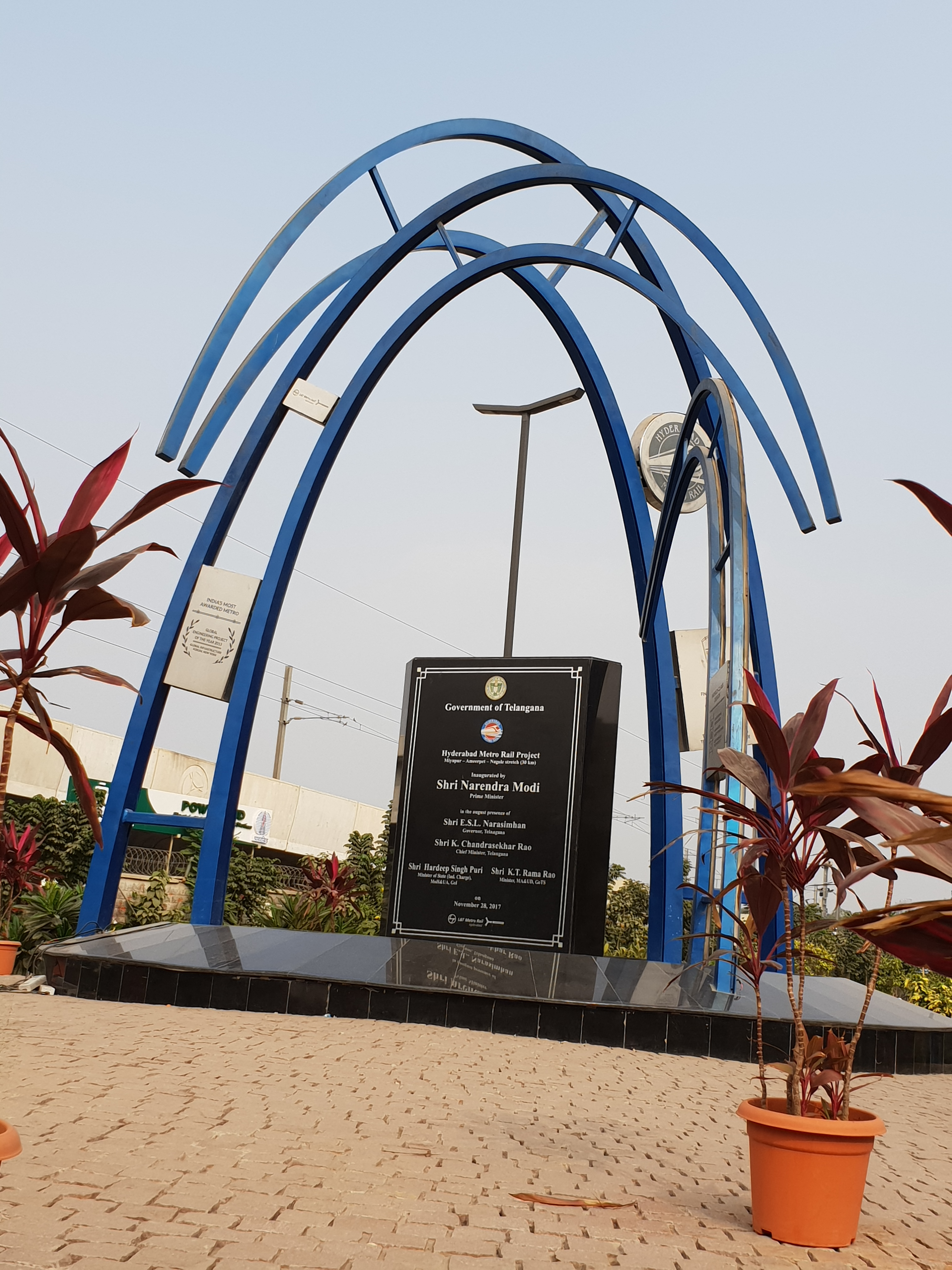
Inauguration plague

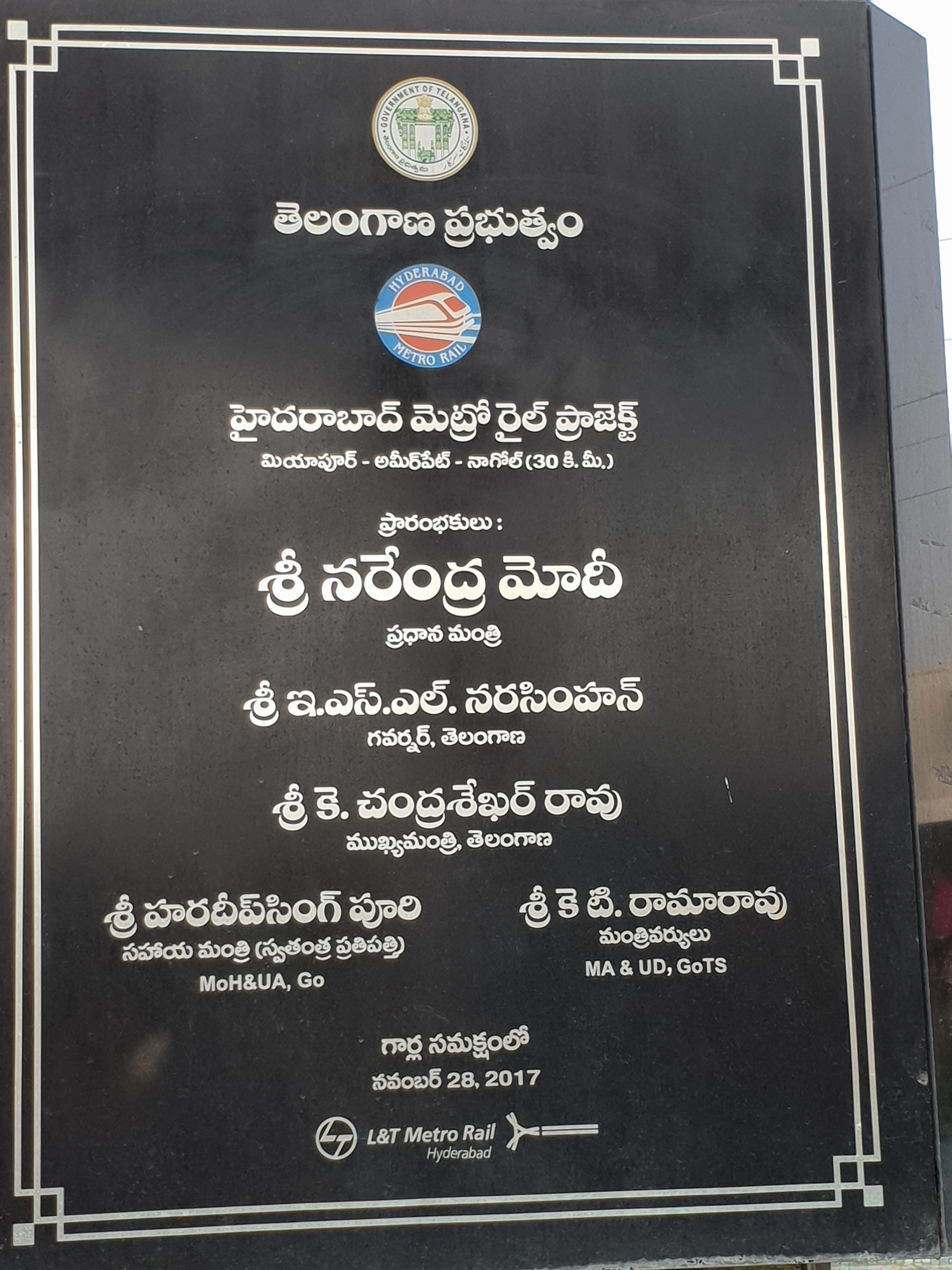
Telugu plaque

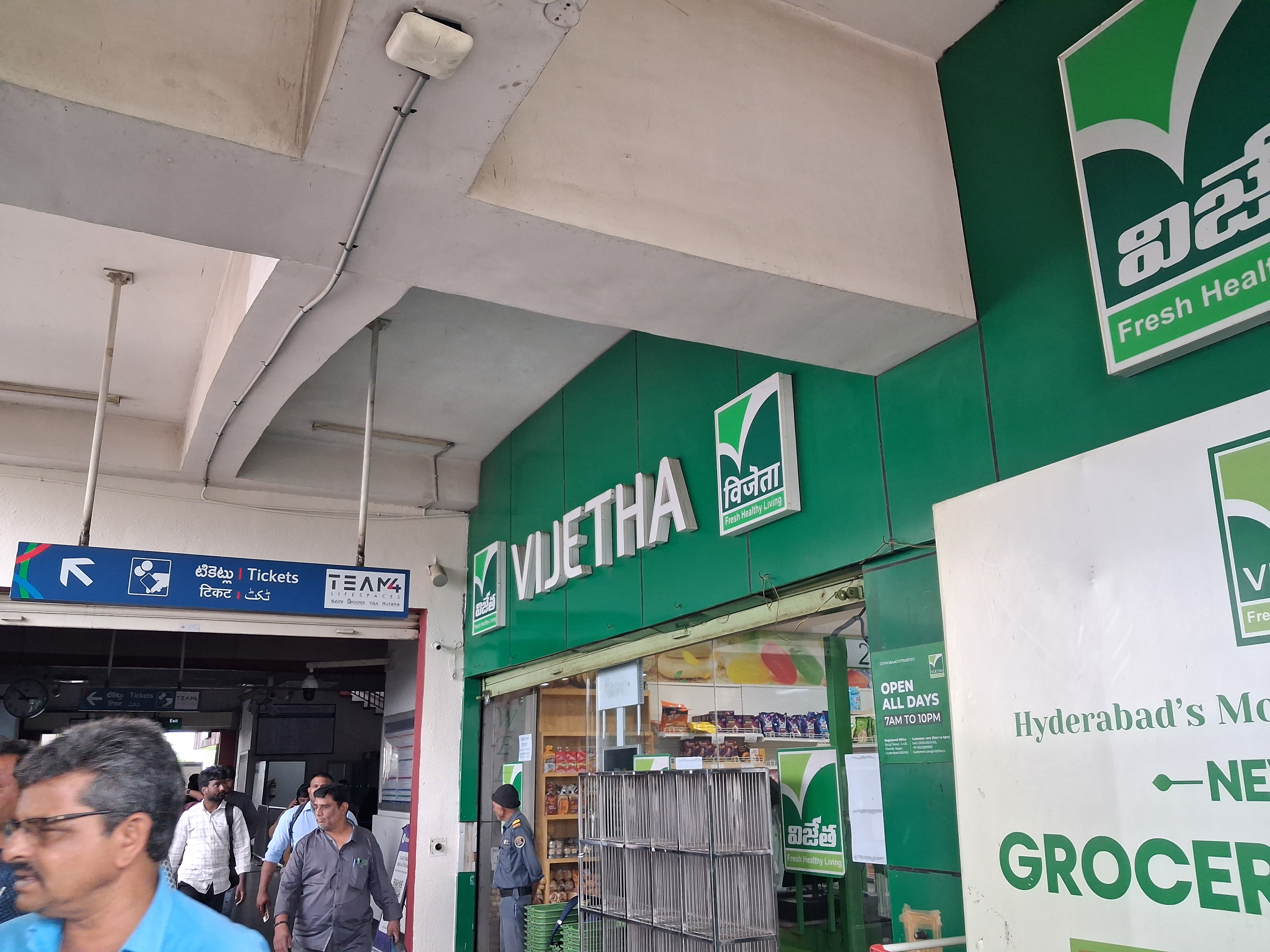
vijetha store in Miyapur metro

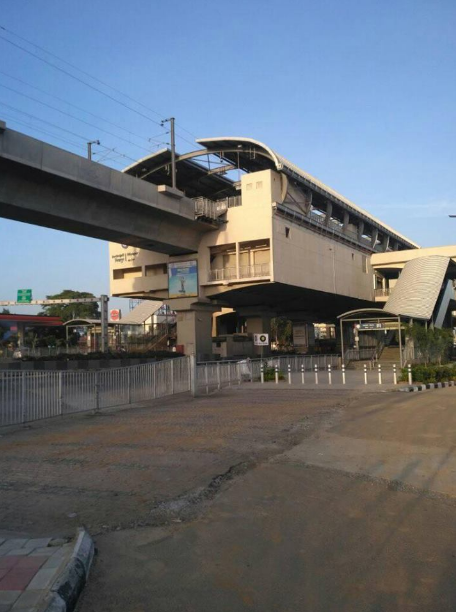
Miyapur metro in 2017

== See also ==
- Hyderabad
- Transport in Hyderabad
- List of rapid transit systems
- List of metro systems
