= Architecture of Telangana =

Architecture of Indian state

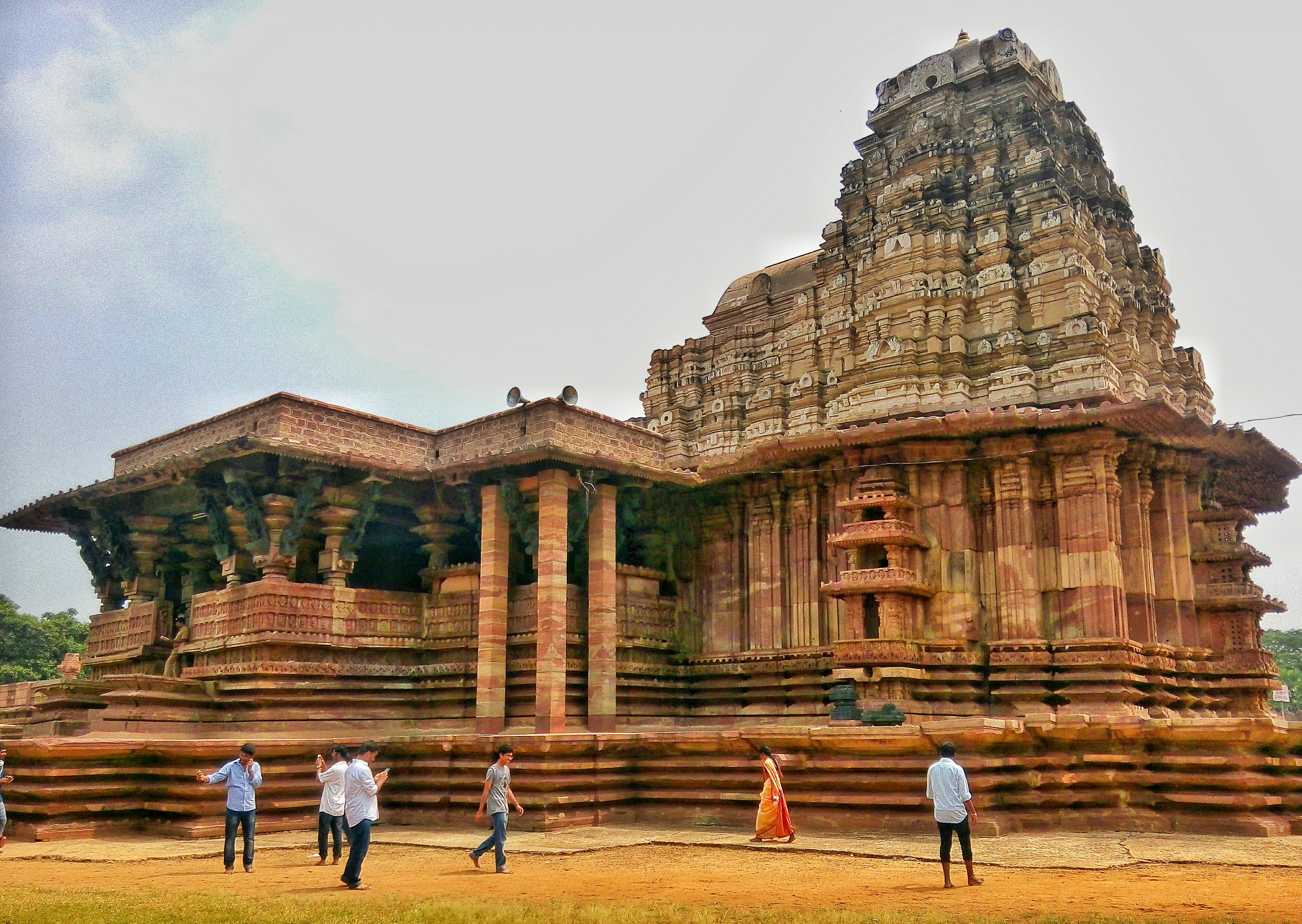
The Ramappa Temple was built by the Kakatiyas, c. 1213

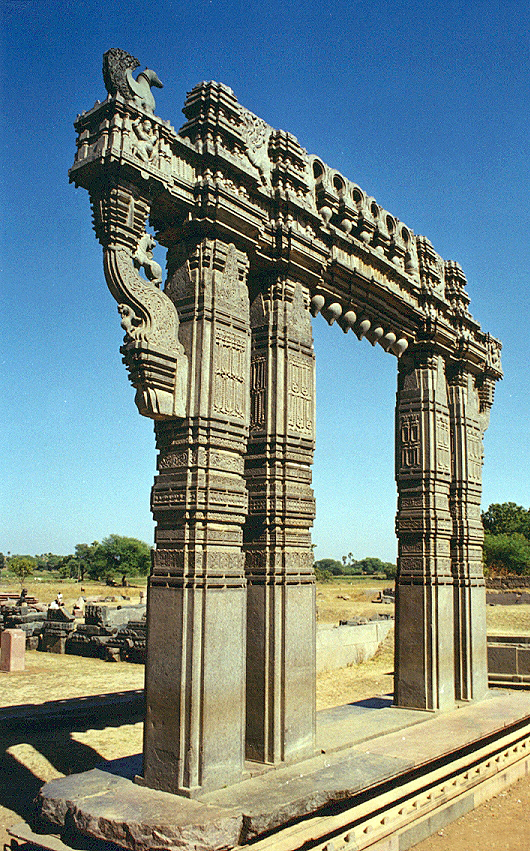
Kakatiya Kala Thoranam

The architecture of Telangana dates back over two thousand years. The Indian state of Telangana is in the Deccan plateau, bordering the coastal plain of Andhra Pradesh. It has produced regional variants of wider styles of Indian architecture, both in Hindu temple architecture and Indo-Islamic architecture.

== Buddhist architecture ==
The Nelakondapalli stupa belongs to the Buddhist period. It is located on the edge of the coastal plain. ASI excavations in recent decades have found remains of a typical monastic complex, and a few works of art. The site seems to have remained active until the 6th century AD.

== Hindu temple architecture ==
=== Chalukya ===
The 7th-century Navabrahma Temples at Alampur were built by the Badami Chalukayas.

=== Kakatiya ===
The Warangal Fort, Ramappa Temple, Kota Gullu and Thousand Pillar Temple are the best examples of Kakatiya architecture.

== Indo-Islamic architecture ==
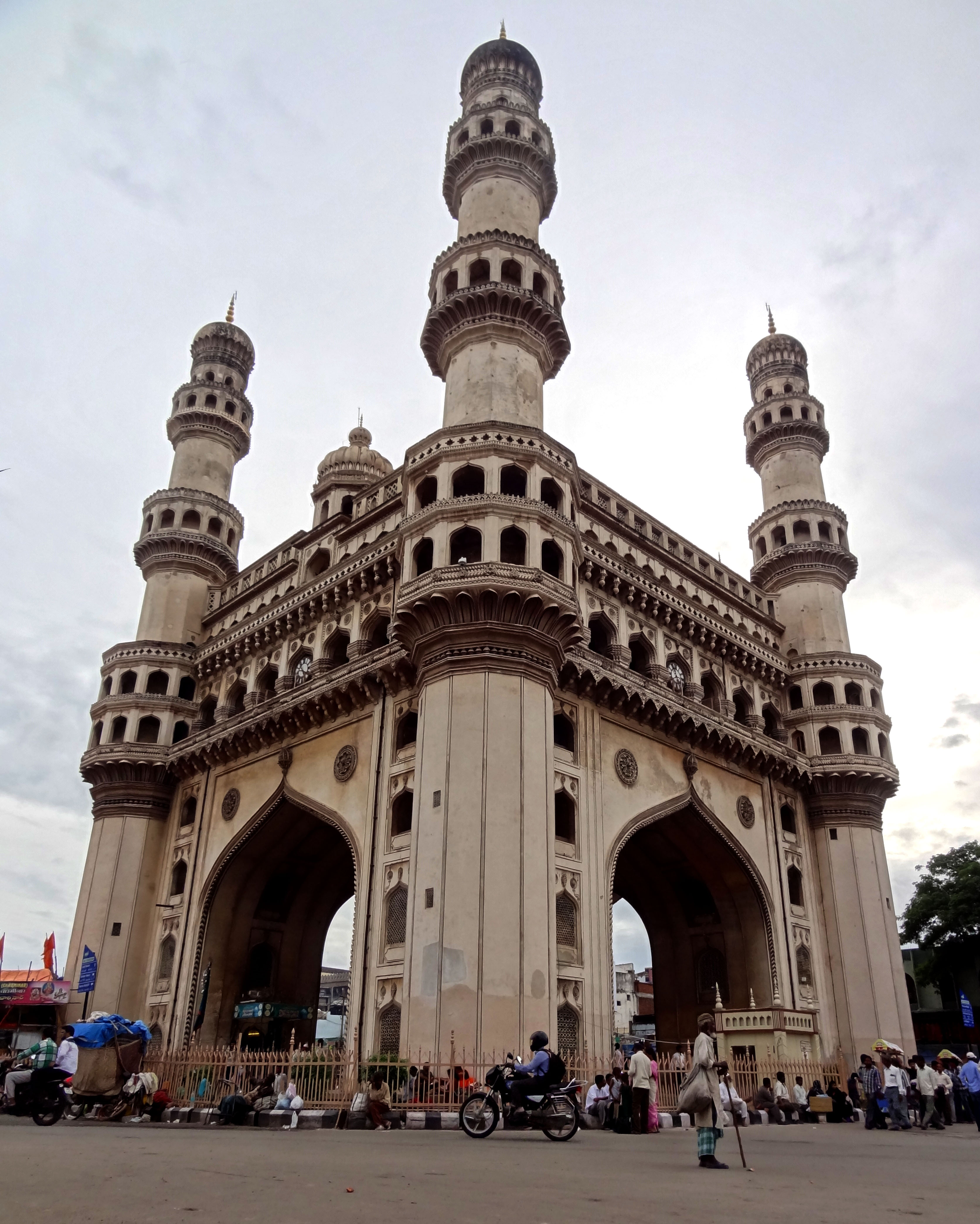
The Charminar in Hyderabad was built by the Golconda Sultanate, 1591

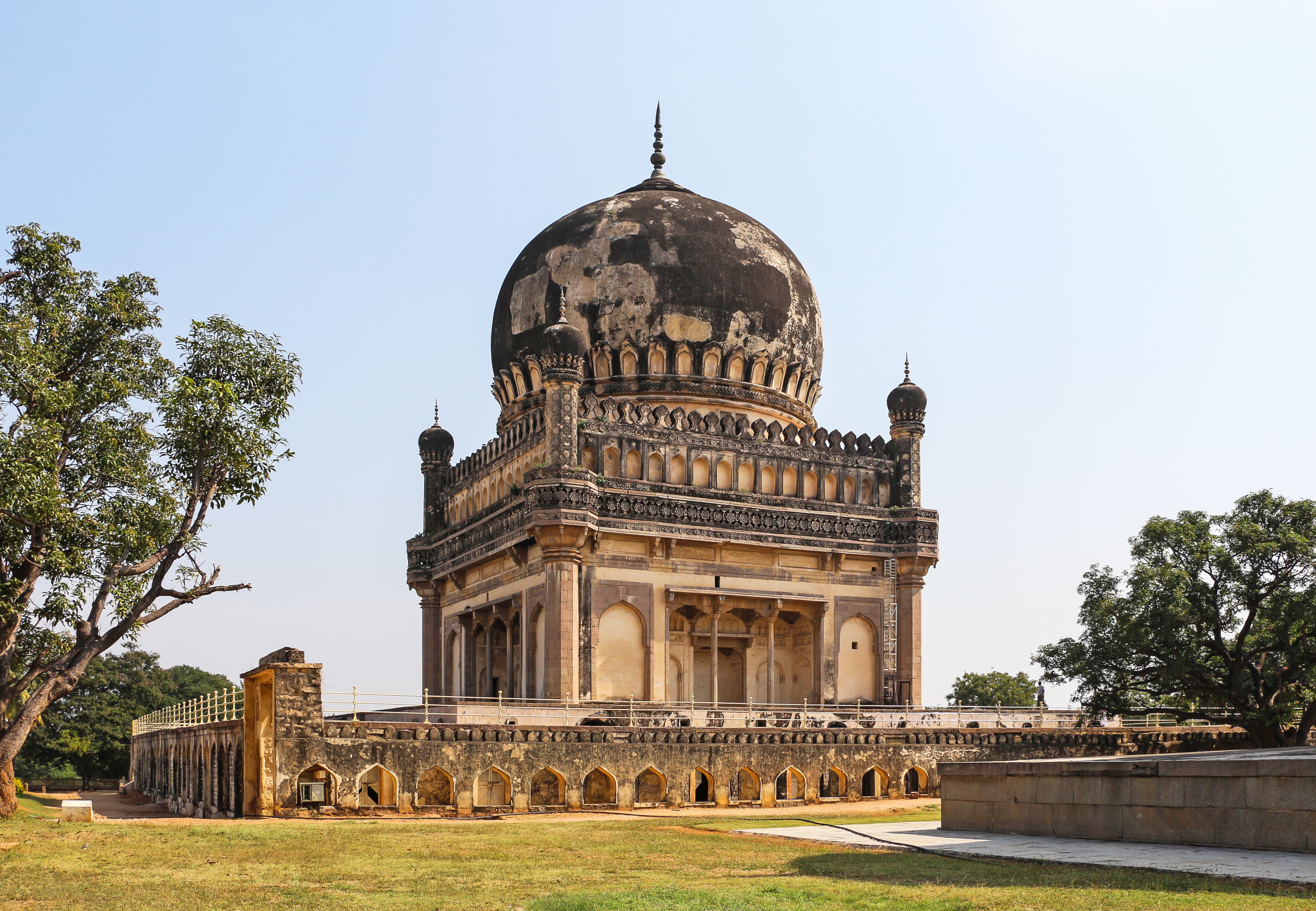
One of the Qutb Shahi tombs.

=== Golconda Sultanate ===
The architecture of the Golconda Sultanate is very similar to that of other Deccan Sultanates. This Indo-Islamic style is unique to the states of Telangana, Andhra Pradesh, Karnataka and Maharashtra. The ruins of the Golconda Fort is the earliest example. They built elaborate tombs and mosques out of mortared stone.

The 16th-century Charminar, a centerpiece of Hyderabad, is a mosque with four minarets at four corners, elaborately decorated with stucco work. It stands at the confluence of four roads. It overlooks the Mecca Masjid, one of the largest mosques in India.

The Qutb Shahi tombs at Hyderabad contain the tombs of the sultans, other royals and important noblemen. Other examples include the Toli Mosque, Khairtabad Mosque and Taramati Baradari.

== Colonial architecture ==
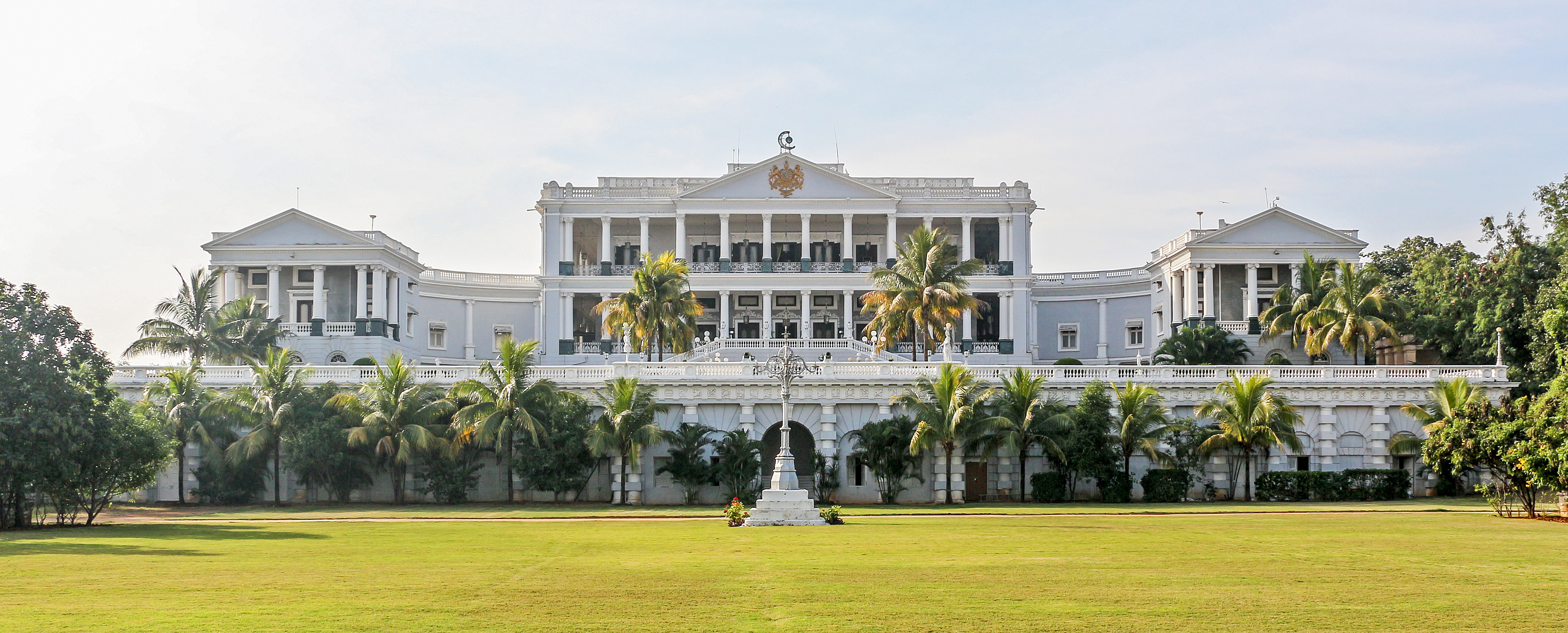
Falaknuma Palace

During the British colonial period, Telangana was ruled by the Nizams of Hyderabad. The seat of the Nizam was Chowmahalla Palace, which showcases a wide variety of Indian and European styles.

=== Neoclassical ===
The British Residency and Falaknuma Palace in Hyderabad built in the neoclassical style is another great example of this period.

=== Art Deco ===
Art deco buildings in Hyderabad include the Monda Market and SBH Building.

=== Indo-Saracenic ===
The High Court, City College, Osmania General Hospital and Kacheguda Railway Station in Hyderabad were designed by British architect Vincent Esch in the Indo-Saracenic style of architecture. The Moazzam Jahi market, although not designed by him, is clearly inspired from Esch's designs.

== Post-Independence ==
Building built in contemporary styles are common in the HITEC City and surrounding neighborhoods of Hyderabad. IIT Hyderabad is also designed in contemporary style by Christopher Benninger.

== Gallery ==
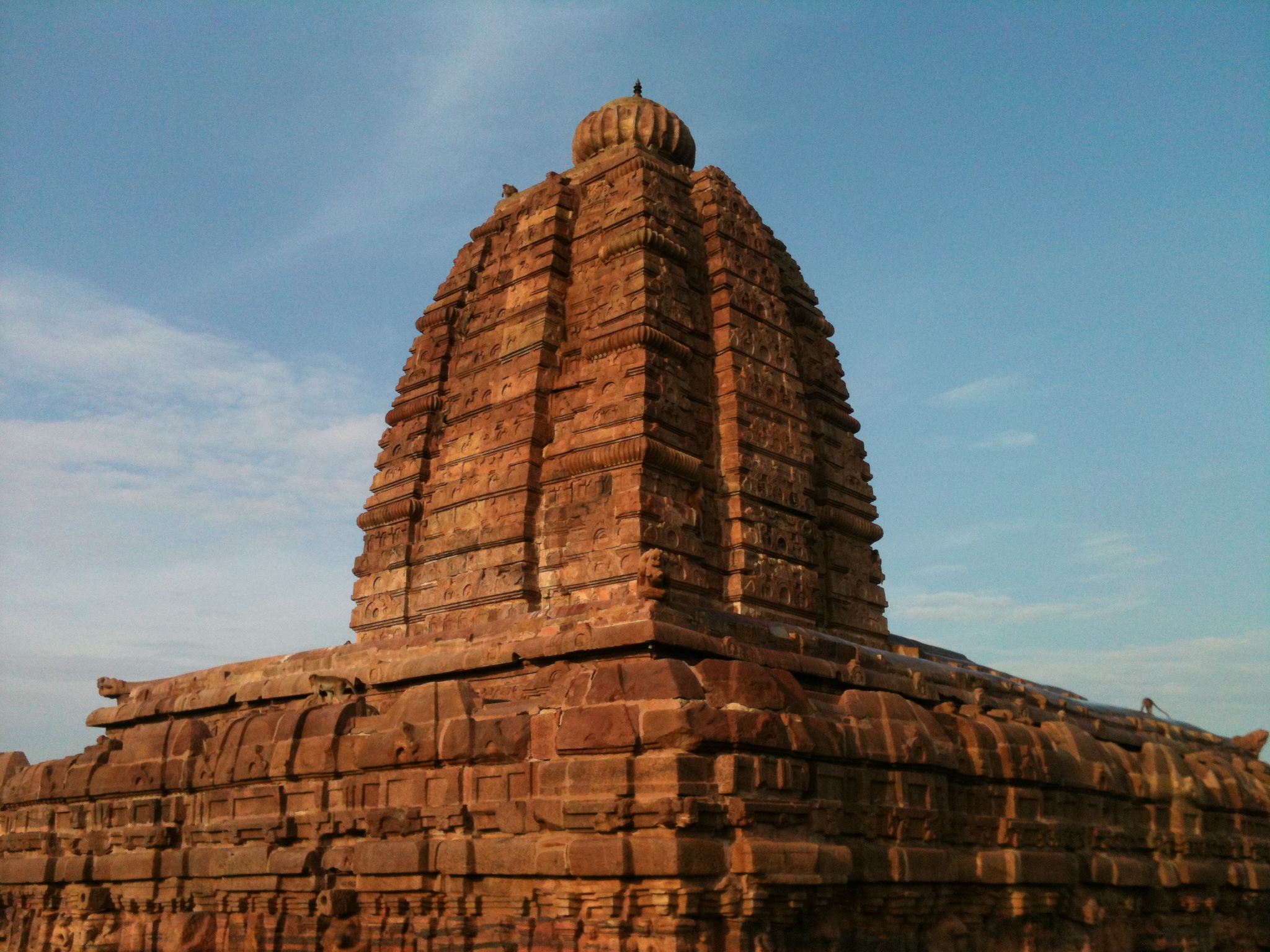
One of the Alampur Navabrahma Temples built by Chalukya Empire between the 7th and 10th centuries.

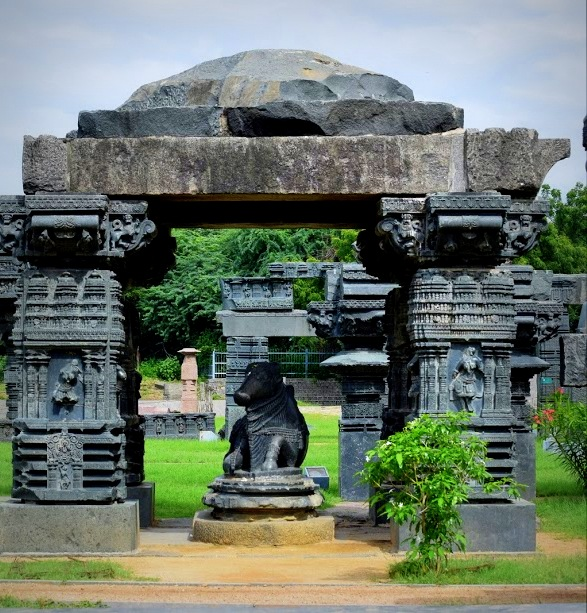
A mandapam at the ruins of the Warangal Fort. The fort was destroyed by the Delhi Sultanate in 1323

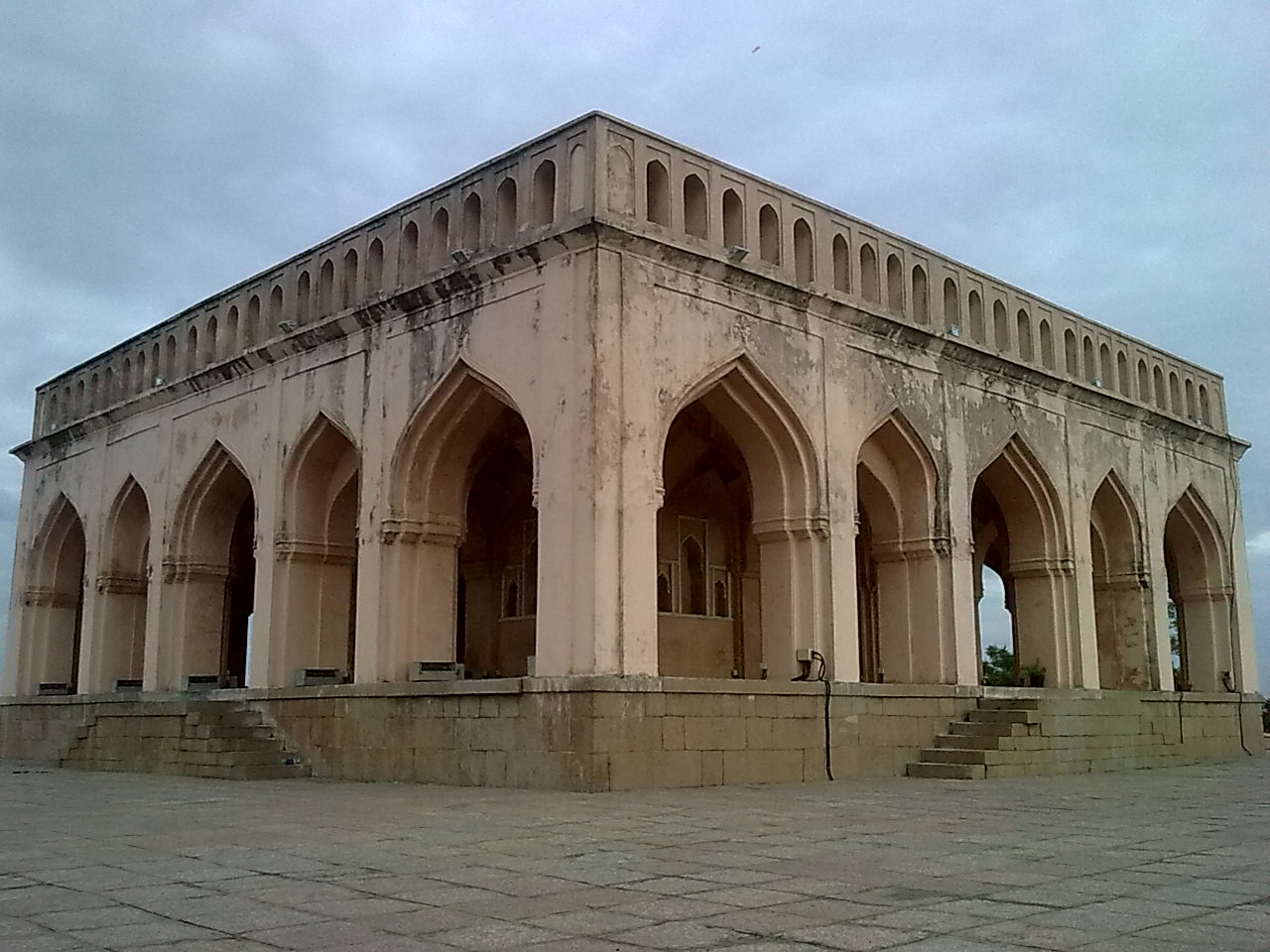
Taramati Baradari, a caravanserai built by the Golconda Sultanate at Hyderabad

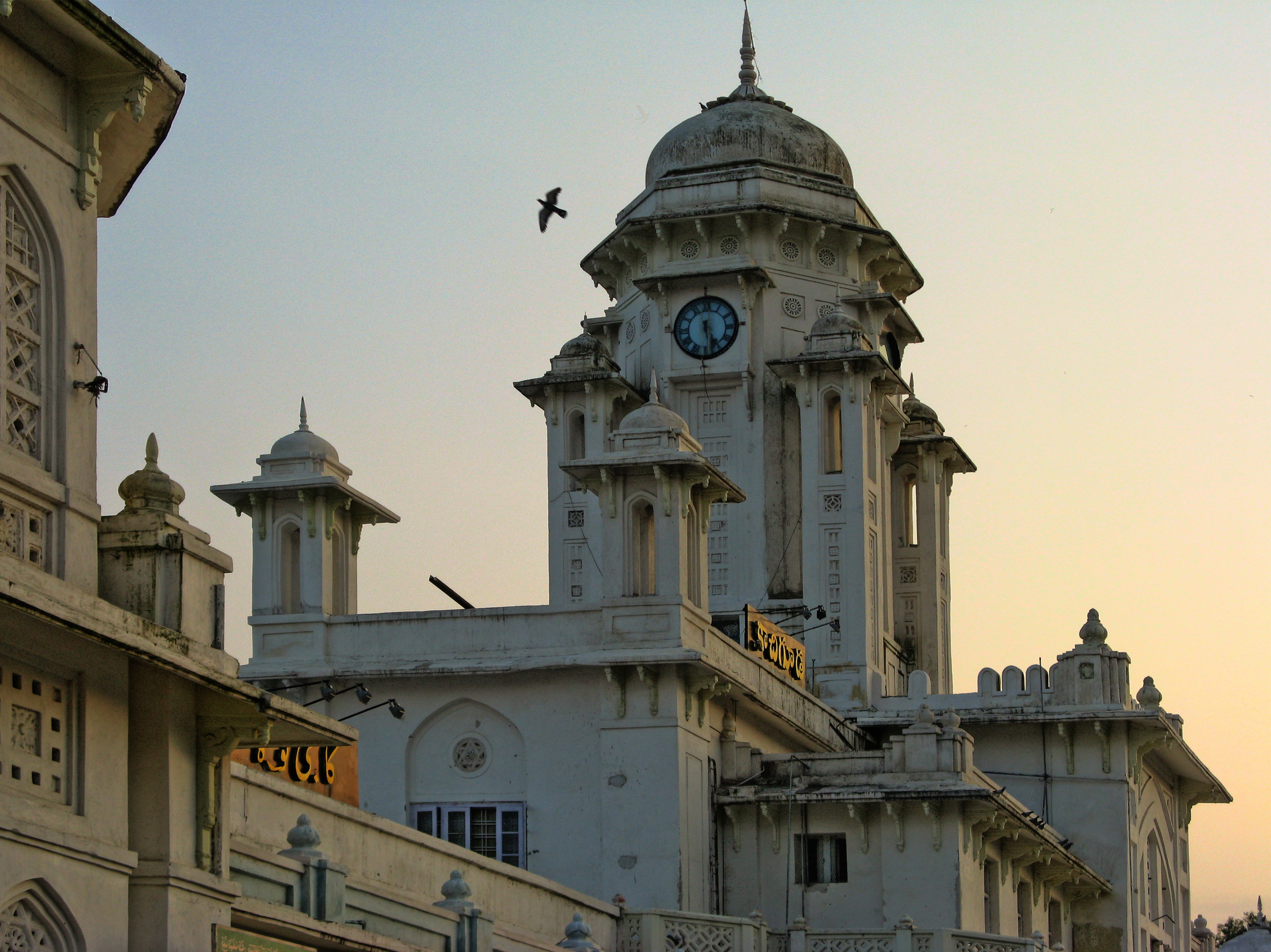
The Kachiguda Railway Station at Hyderabad was designed by Vincent Esch

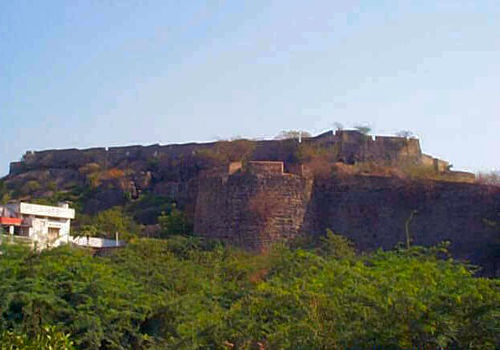
Khammam Khilla

== Bibliography ==
- Bilgrami, Syed Ali Asgar (1927). Landmarks of the Deccan. Government Central Press, Hyderabad.
- Haig, Major T. W. (1907). Historic Landmarks of the Deccan. Pioneer Press, Allahabad.
