= Numaish =

Annual consumer exhibition in Hyderabad

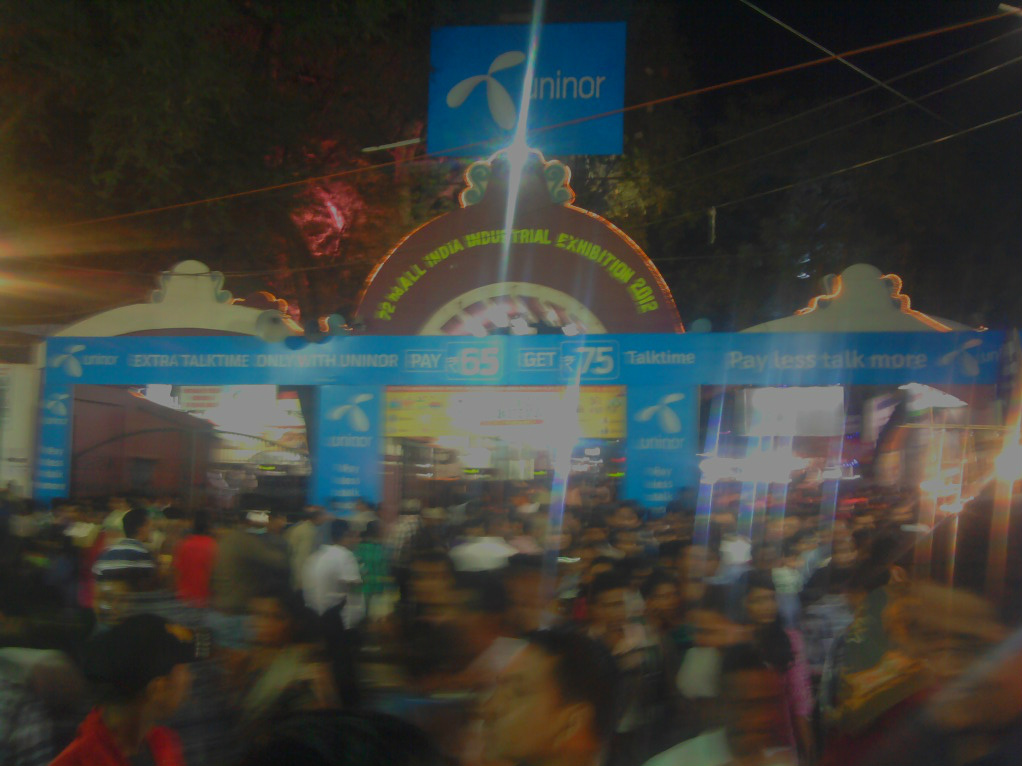
- Ajanta Gate
- Genre: State fair
- Dates: 1 January – 15 February
- Locations: Nampally, Hyderabad, Telangana, India
- Years active: 1938–present
- Organiser: All-India Industrial Exhibition (AIIE) Society

Numaish Masnuāt-e-Mulki (transl. 'Exhibition of the Local Products & Crafts'), or simply Numaish (transl. 'Exhibition'), is an annual consumer exhibition held in Hyderabad, Telangana, India. The exhibition has remained the only event of its kind in the world to be organised at a stretch for a 46-day period at its 9.3-hectare (23-acre) permanent venue in Nampally. It features various joy rides, variety of eateries, food stalls and non-alcoholic drinks, ice cream stalls, and other entertainment options for the visitors.

== History ==
Numaish Masnuāt-e-Mulki was started in 1938 to showcase local products & their crafts. The idea to organise such a fair was reportedly conceptualised after discussions held by the Economic Committee of the Osmania Graduates Association and then supported by Sir Akbar Hydari (then Prime Minister of Hyderabad). The event was also supported by then Nizam Mir Osman Ali Khan. The first fair was held in 1938 at Public Gardens with around 50 stalls and later in 1946 the event was shifted to the Exhibition Grounds, near Nampally Railway Station The event was renamed to All India Industrial Exhibition, and was renamed back to its original name, Numaish in 2009.

It was cancelled in 2021 by the Telangana Government due to COVID-19 pandemic in India, and in 2022 Numaish exhibition was initially suspended in the wake of Omicron variant outbreak. The Exhibition Society had decided to reschedule the nomination from 25th of Feb 2022 as the number of corona cases were declining and the situation was under control. It was held every day from 4 pm to 10:30 pm. and concluded on 8 April 2022.

== Exhibition ==
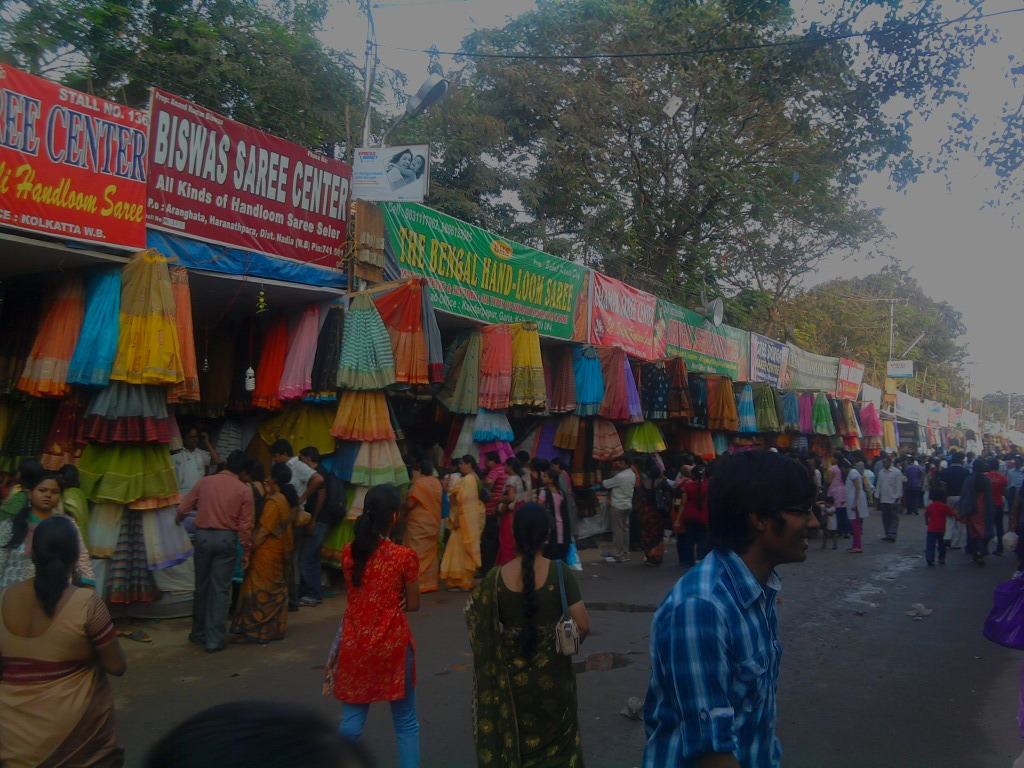
Shops at Numaish

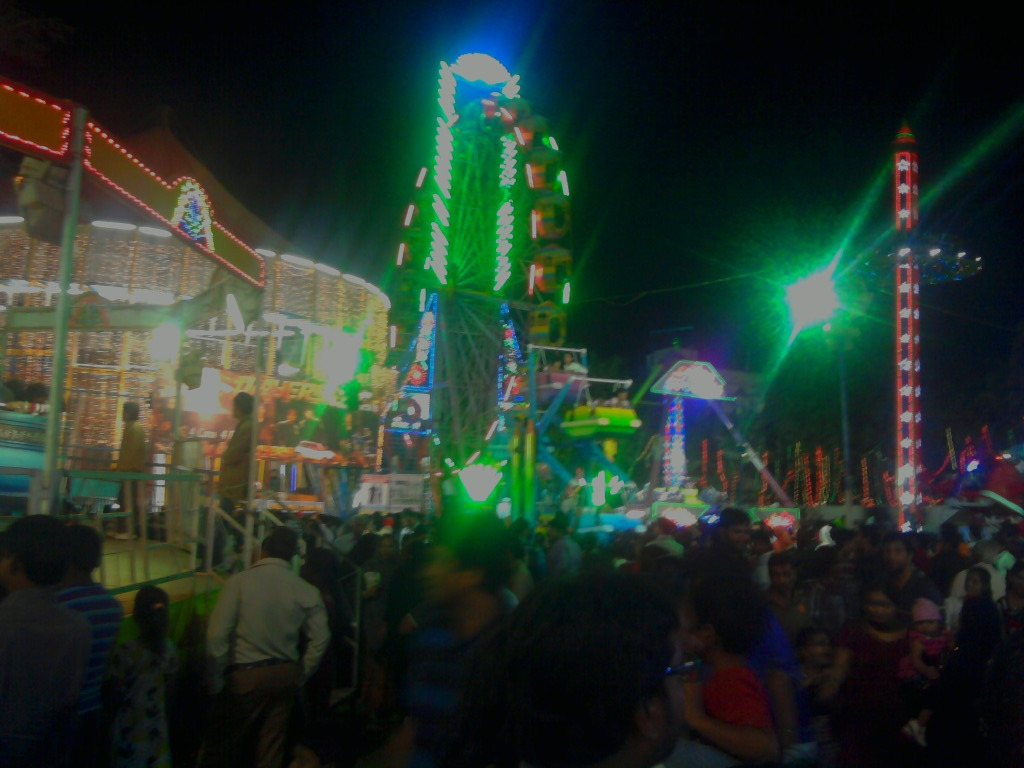
Rides at Numaish

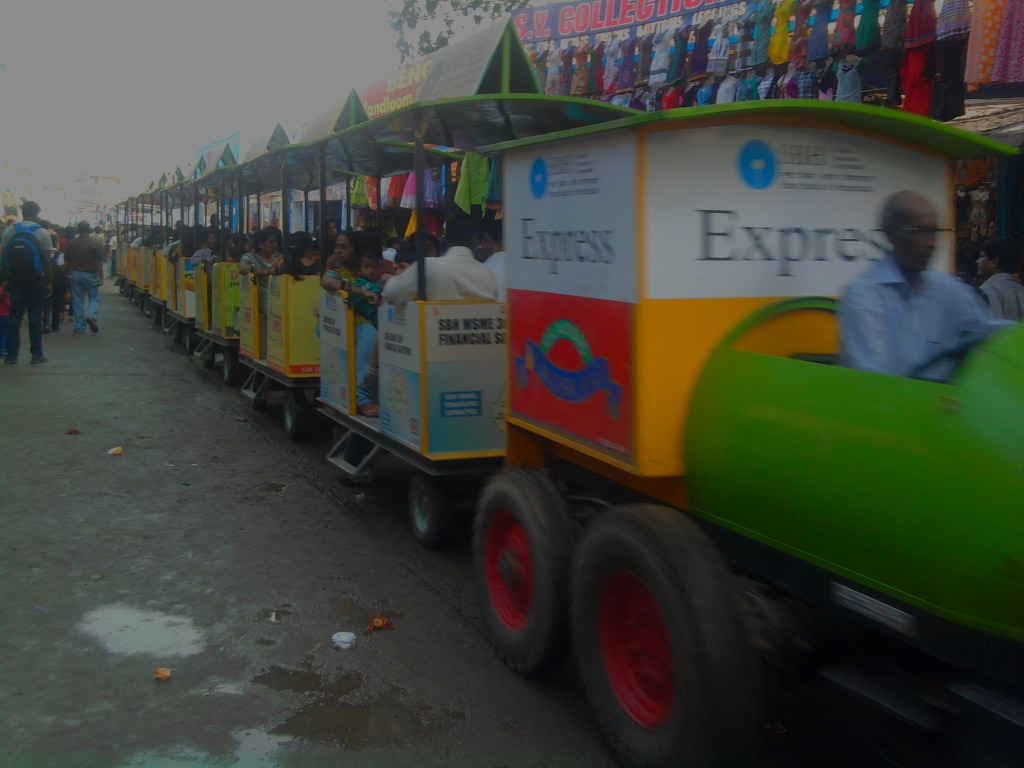
Toy train

The exhibition features nuts and handcrafts of Jammu and Kashmir to handmade garments from Uttar Pradesh, West Bengal and Madhya Pradesh, handicraft items from all over India and electronic goods of the best brands in the country. There are special stalls organised by different ladies groups, convicts and much more. The exhibition also featured carpets of Iran and some stalls from Pakistan till 2011. But due to diplomatic reasons they will not be available from 2012. Hyderabadi haleem is sold by Hyderabadi restaurant Pista House at the exhibition.

There are three entry points: Gate No. 1 (Gandhi Bhavan Gate), Gate No. 2 (Ajanta Gate), Gate No. 3 (Goshamahal Gate). The Ajanta Gate is the main entrance and the biggest.

== Entry and parking ==
For entry to the exhibition, ₹40 is charged per head. As of 2025, the entry ticket is ₹50 per head.

From 2012, car parking is provided with fixed ₹500 as fee for four-wheelers and ₹200 for two-wheelers. Besides, there is a lot of parking space inside the exhibition grounds. Vehicles are allowed entry until 4 pm. Another official parking space has been identified on the premises of Government Junior College, Nampally (opposite Gandhi Bhavan) Still there are incidents of duping people in name of car parking. The miscreants who have leased out the open grounds near the exhibition charge ₹500 for a four-wheeler and ₹200 for a two-wheeler.

== Surveillance ==
75 CCTVs, a three-tier security system has been put in place while door-frame-metal detectors have been installed at the three entry locations. Apart from these, watch and ward are on duty till 9 pm everyday during the exhibition. Live video streaming of the Numaish with the help of two tilt and zoom cameras is posted on the internet. From 2012, Geographical Information System (GIS) has been used to allot the stalls based on the availability of the space in the grounds.

== Revenue ==
In 2011, about 2.1 million people visited the exhibition and the society collected a revenue of ₹130 million (equivalent to ₹290 million or US$3.0 million in 2026).

== Cultural programmes ==
Several cultural programmes are conducted in the Exhibition Club during the 46-day period that include classical and popular musical concerts, magic shows, mushaira (poetry) etc. In recent times Bollywood and Tollywood artists have also performed during the Numaish.

The 75th edition of the Numaish inaugurated on 1 January 2015 saw many special programmes in Telugu and Urdu including performances by Tollywood artists as well as special ghazal programmes and comedy programmes that have been attended in large numbers by visitors. The newly renovated club hall was the venue for a special tribute to Legendary poets of Urdu performed by top ghazal singers of Hyderabad. This was a rare occasion where so many well known ghazal singers got together and performed on the same stage. Some of the poets whose ghazals were presented are Ghalib, Iqbal, Mir Taqi Mir, Faiz Ahmed Faiz, Ibn-E-Insha and more.

Games will be available from 6 pm onwards.

Padma Bhushan awardee S. P. Balasubrahmanyam was felicitated by the Exhibition Society on 8 February 2015 in a programme arranged by the society's club and reception sub-committee. The president of the society, Eatala Rajender, Telangana minister for finance, did the honours along with the other office bearers of the society. S. P. Balasubrahmanyam spoke and praised the services being rendered by the Exhibition Society. He also performed a few of his numbers along with a number of other Telugu film industry singers who came and performed as a tribute to Balu Sir (as he is fondly addressed).

== Transport ==
Numaish Exhibition Grounds can be reached from Gandhi Bhavan metro station and Nampally Metro Station.
