= Gandhi Bhavan metro station =

Metro station in Hyderabad, India

Gandhi Bhavan
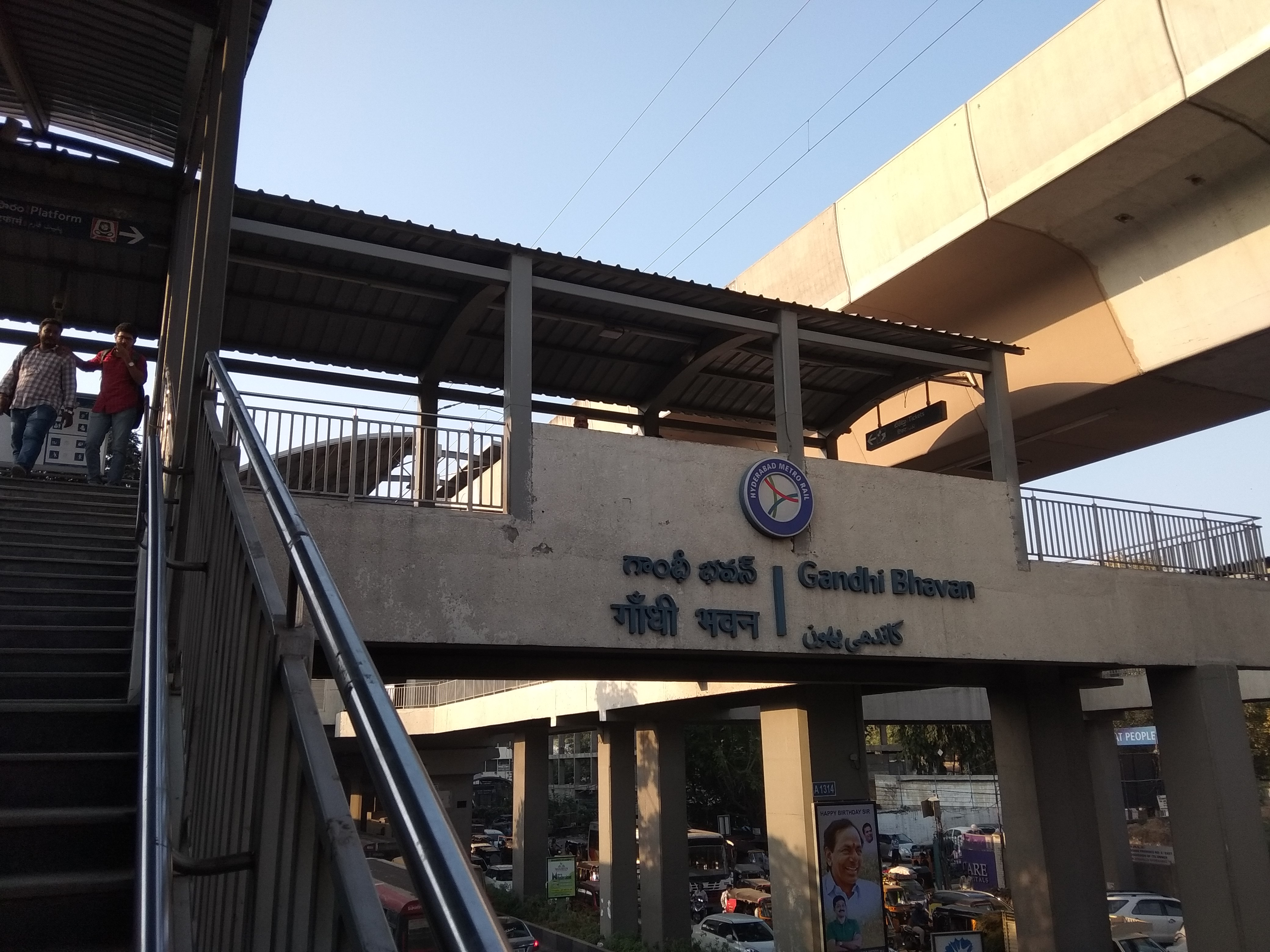

General information
- Location: Gandhi Bhavan, Hyderabad
- Coordinates: 17.348426°N 78.550959°E
- System: Hyderabad Metro station
- Line: Red Line
- Platforms: 2
- Tracks: 2

Construction
- Structure type: Elevated
- Depth: 7.07 m (23.2 ft)
- Platform levels: 2

History
- Opened: 24 September 2018

Services
Preceding station	Hyderabad Metro	Following station
Nampally towards Miyapur	Red Line	Osmania Medical College towards LB Nagar
Location

The Gandhi Bhavan Metro Station is located on the Red Line of the Hyderabad Metro, in the city of Hyderabad, Telangana, India. It is near to Care Hospital, Ram Ki Bandi, Hotel Shadab and Numaish Exhibition Grounds.

== History ==
It was opened on 24 September 2018.

== Station layout ==
Street Level
This is the first level where passengers may park their vehicles and view the local area map.

Concourse level
Ticketing office or Ticket Vending Machines (TVMs) is located here. Retail outlets and other facilities like washrooms, ATMs, first aid, etc., will be available in this area.

Platform level
This layer consists of two platforms. Trains takes passengers from this level.

G	Street level	Exit/Entrance
L1	Mezzanine	Fare control, station agent, Metro Card vending machines, crossover
L2	Side platform | Doors will open on the left
L2	Platform 1 Southbound	Towards → Vasavi LB Nagar next station is Osmania Medical College
L2	Platform 2 Northbound	Towards ← Miyapur next station is Nampally
L2	Side platform | Doors will open on the left
L2
