= Musi River (India) =

River in Telangana, India

Coordinates: 17°22′N 78°28′E

Musi River Muchukunda River
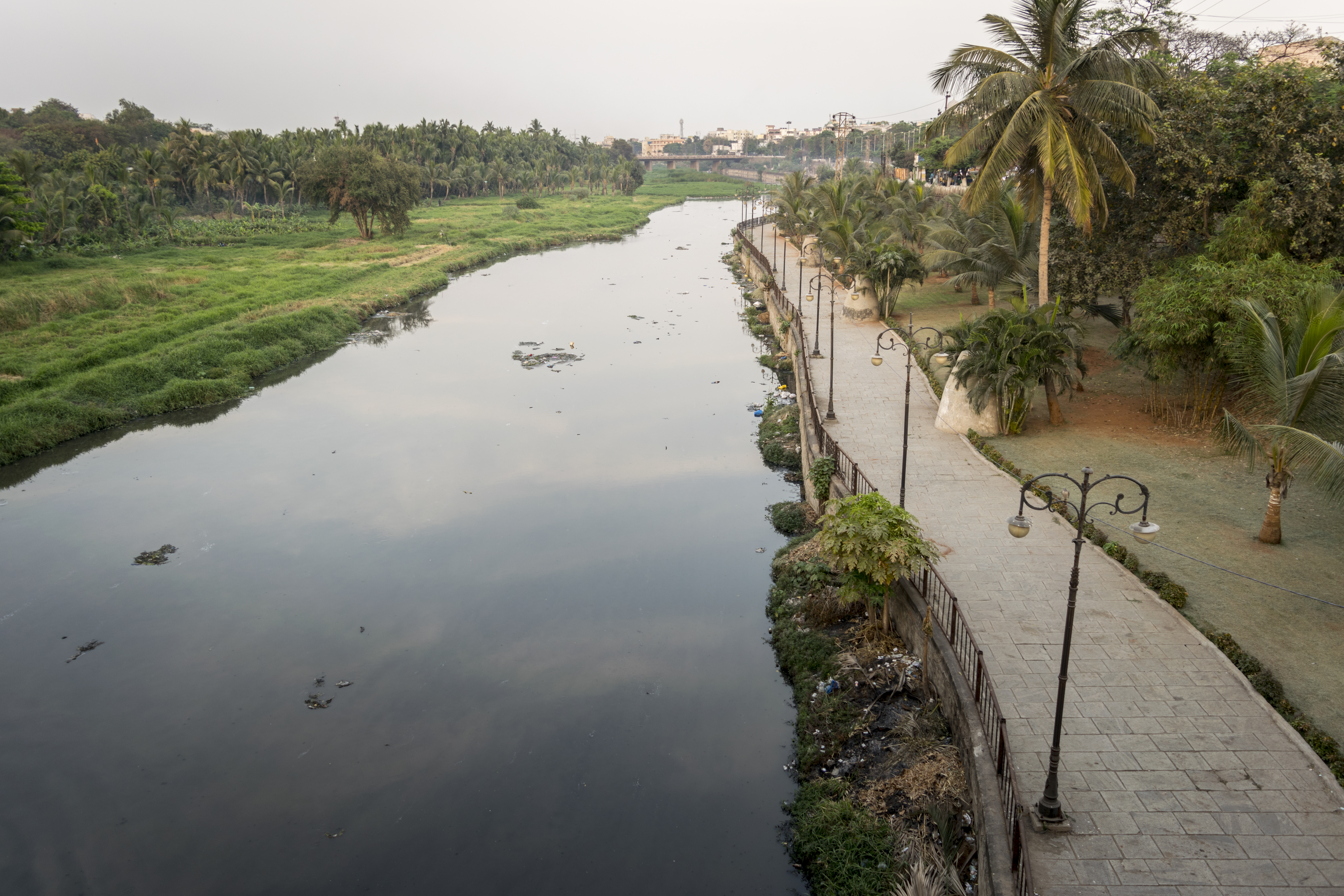
- Musi River in Old City of Hyderabad, Telangana

Location
- State: Telangana
- Origin: Ananthagiri Hills, Vikarabad

Physical characteristics
- Length: 250 km (160 mi)

Basin features
- Bridges: Purana Pul; Naya Pul

The Musi River, also known as Muchukunda or Musunuru river, is a major tributary of the Krishna River in the Deccan Plateau, flowing through Telangana, India. Hyderabad stands on the banks of the Musi River, and the river divides the historic Old City from the newer part of the city. The Musi flows into Himayat Sagar and Osman Sagar, which are artificial lakes that act as reservoirs that once supplied the twin cities of Hyderabad and Secunderabad with drinking water. The Musi originates in the Ananthagiri Hills, near Vikarabad. It generally flows towards the east, turning south at Chittaloor. It flows into the Krishna River at Vadapally near Miryalaguda in Nalgonda district.

== Etymology ==
According to some accounts, the river derived its name from two tributaries — Moosa and Esi which originate in Ananthagiri forest and have supposed to have been merged with each other near Langar Houz. As per others, the river was also once named as Musunuru or Muchukunda. According to the Hindu mythology, Muchukunda was a king who later became a sage.

== Musi River Historic Buildings ==
- Women's College, Koti
- Telangana High Court
- City college
- Osmania General Hospital
- State Central Library

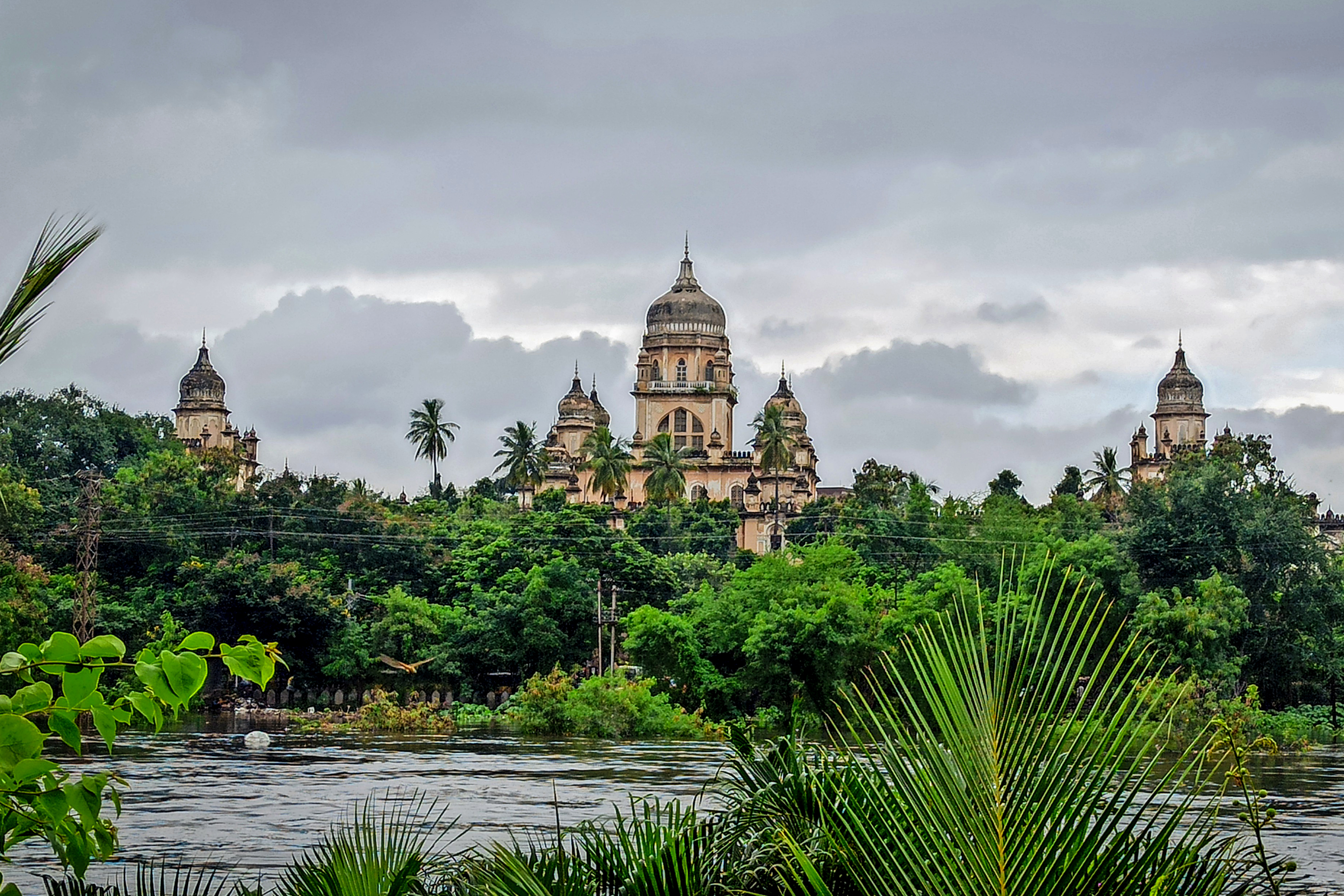
View of Osmania General Hospital on the banks of Musi

City college, Osmania General Hospital, State Central Library, Telangana High Court and Women's College were included in the list of 2025 World Monuments Watch, by the New York-based organisation World Monuments Fund.

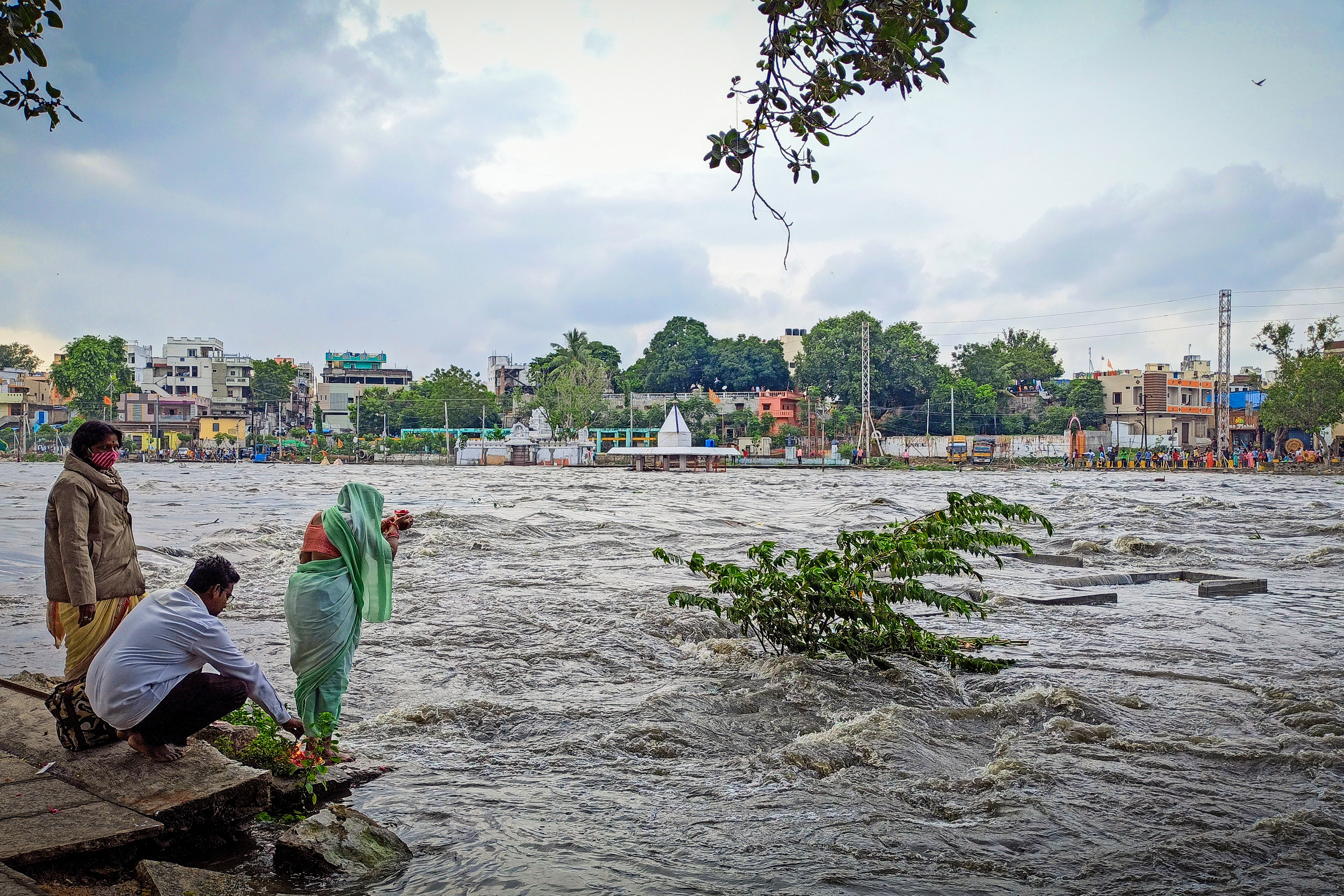
People praying at the banks of Musi in Hyderabad

Mahatma Gandhi Bus Station and Salar Jung Museum are also located on the banks of Musi river

== Floods ==
The Musi river was the cause of frequent flood devastation of Hyderabad city until the early decades of the 20th century. On 28 September 1908, Hyderabad was flooded, which included 17 inches of rain in one day, killing around 15,000 people.

Musi River is a tributary of the Krishna River in the Deccan Plateau

The modern era of the development of the twin cities began soon after these floods in 1908. This necessitated planned, phased development.

Abdallah Ahmed Bin Mahfooz submitted his report on 1 October 1909, with recommendations on preventing a recurrence of floods and improving civic amenities. However, there are conflicting reports that Sir M. Visvesvaraya was engaged by the erstwhile Nizam to help design the drainage system and prevent floods. Nizam VII constituted a City Improve Trust in 1912. He built a flood control system on the river. A dam was built in 1920 across the river, ten miles (16 km) upstream from the city called Osman Sagar. In 1927 another reservoir was built on Esi (a tributary of Musi) and named Himayat Sagar. These lakes prevented the flooding of the River Musi and are major drinking water sources for Hyderabad city.

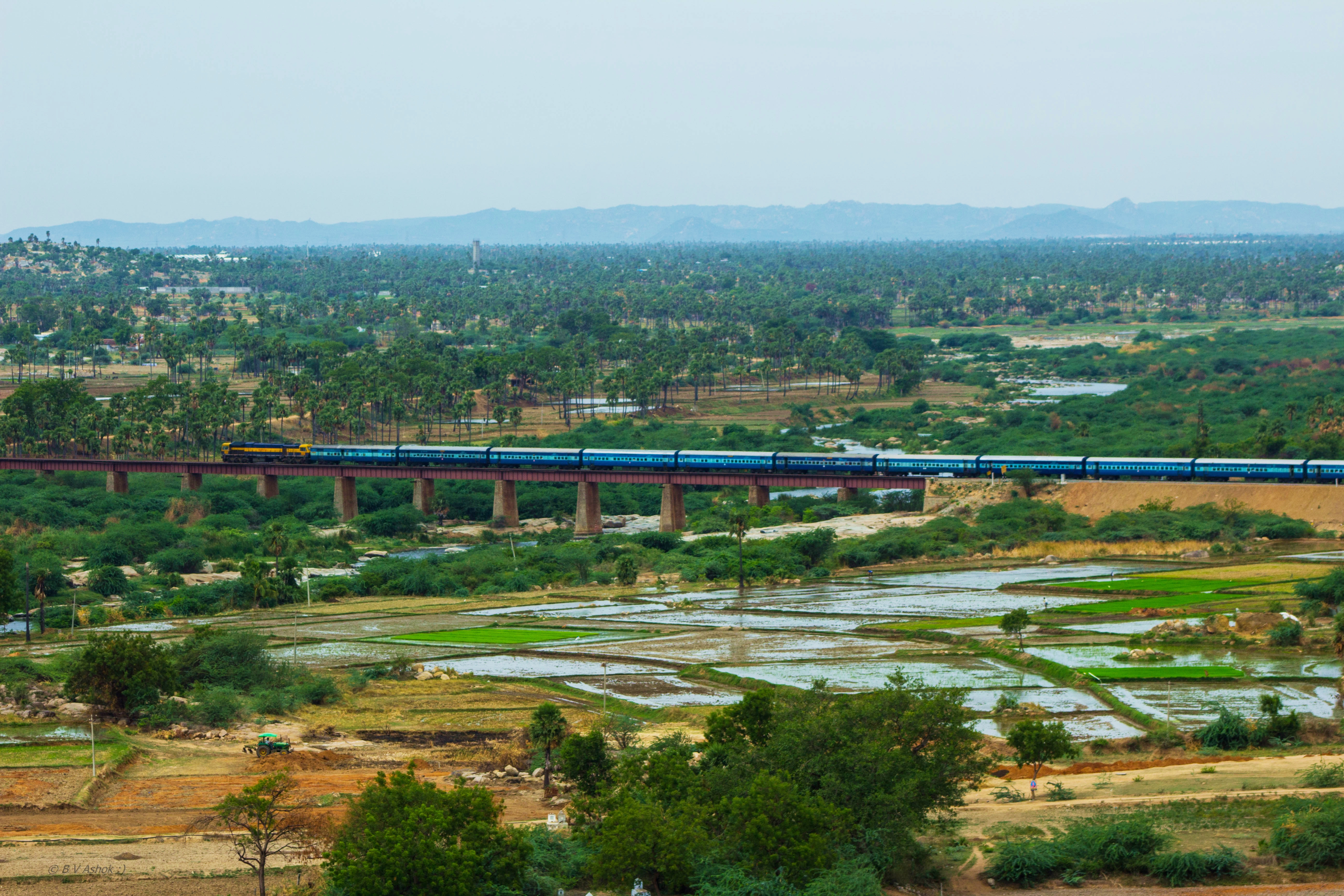
Railway bridge over Musi river at Yadadri Bhuvanagiri

== Pollution ==
In 2022, the Musi river was the 22nd most polluted river in the world.
