= Mohammed Fayazuddin =

Indian architect

Mohammed Fayazuddin FRIBA
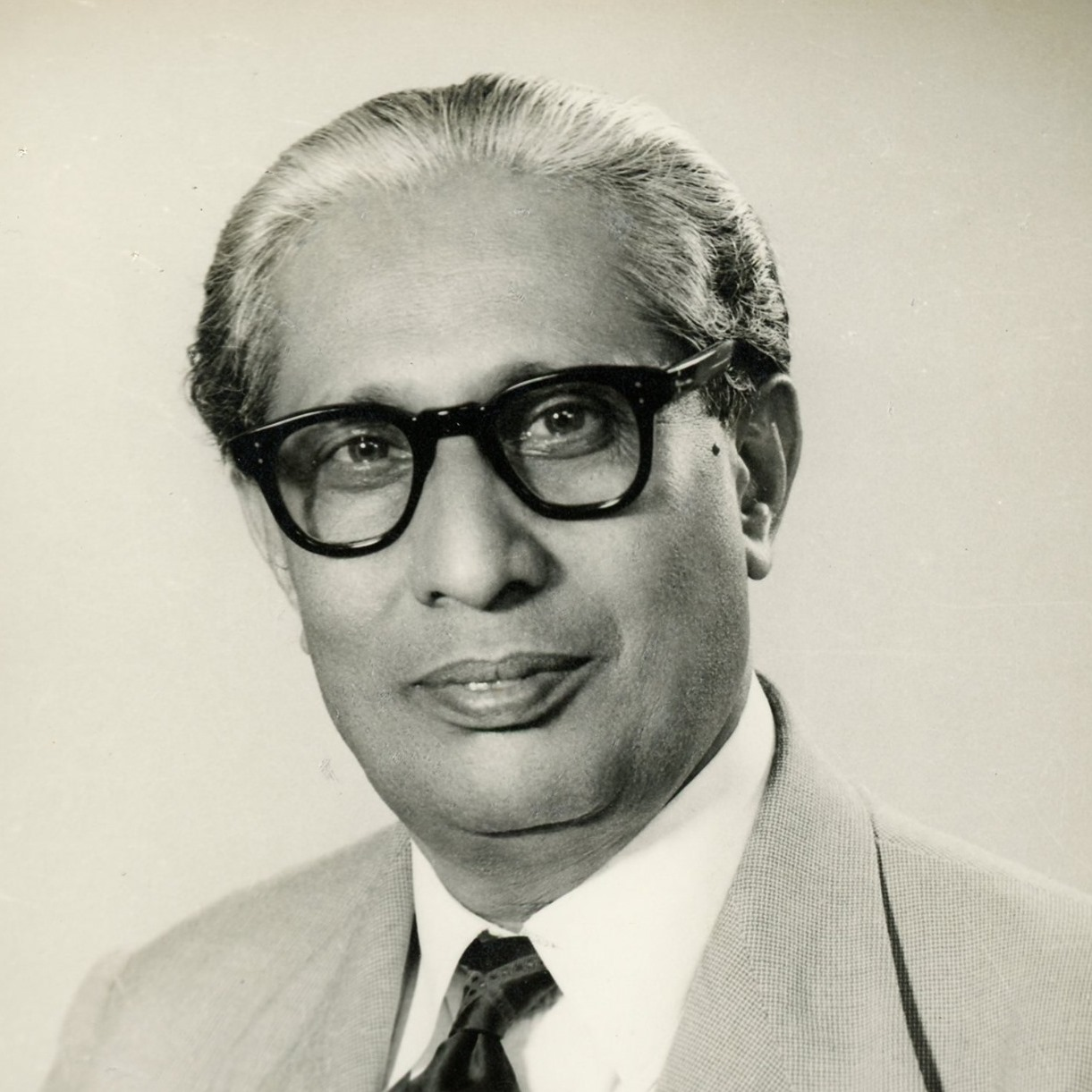
- Born: 22 September 1903
- Died: 1977 (aged 73–74)
- Education: Architectural Association School of Architecture
- Occupation: Architect
- Awards: Padma Shri (1977)

Mohammed Fayazuddin Nizami (22 September 1903 - 1977) was an Indian architect and town planner. He was awarded the Padma Shri in 1977.

Born in Hyderabad, he studied at the Sir J. J. School of Art in Mumbai and Architectural Association School of Architecture, England. He returned to India in 1934 and started working for the government of Hyderabad State. His major projects in Hyderabad include the State Bank of Hyderabad building (1952), Gandhi Bhavan (1956), Ravindra Bharathi (1961), and the Salar Jung Museum building (1968).

== Early life and education ==
Born into one of the noble families of Hyderabad, he was the second son of Nawab Muqayyaruddin. He had three brothers Afzaluddin, Naseeruddin and Yousufuddin. His brothers Afzaluddin and Yousufuddin were architects. After completing his early education at the City College, he studied at the Sir J. J. School of Art and later went on to study at the Architectural Association School of Architecture.

== Career ==
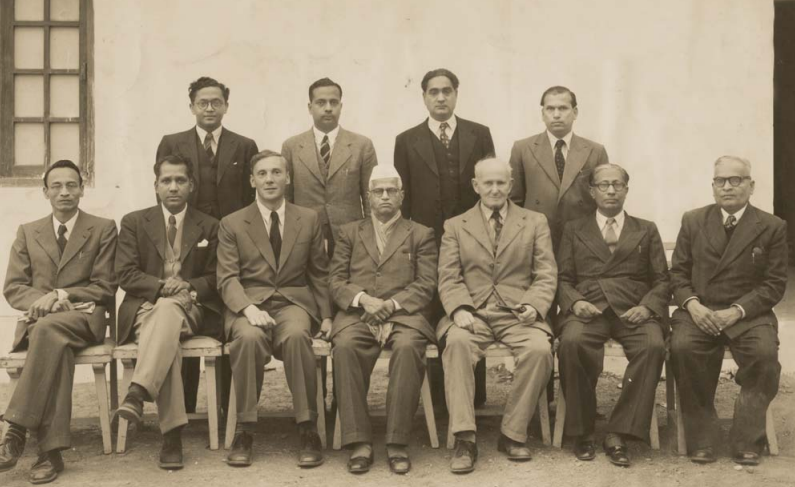
Founding members of the Institute of Town Planners, India. Fayazuddin is seated fourth from left

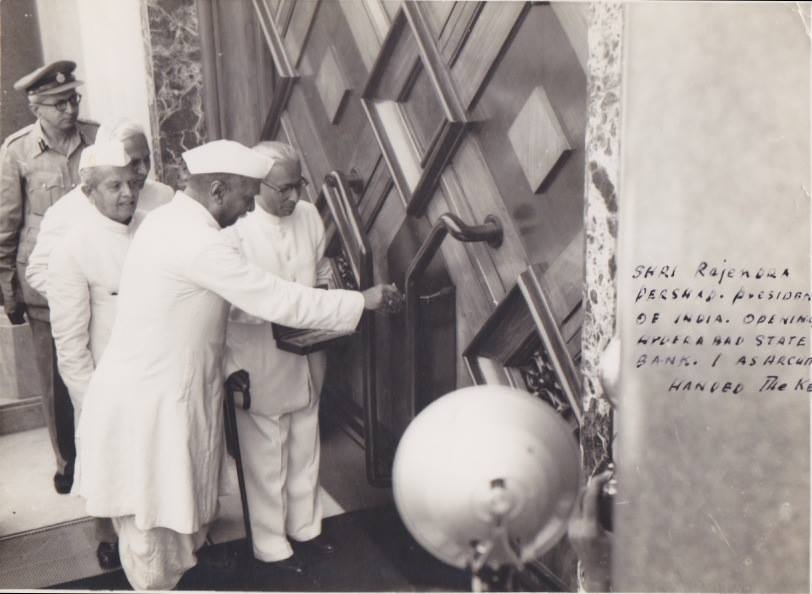
Fayazuddin hands the keys to President of India Rajendra Prasad as he inaugurates the State Bank of Hyderabad building, 1956

In 1934, he returned to Hyderabad and took up a job as a town planner. He designed the master plan for the city of Bahawalpur.

His initial projects include various bungalows and residences, including his own residence Alhambra, Sayyid Naqi Bilgrami mansion, and the residence of Ali Yavar Jung.

He was a founding member of the Institute Of Town Planners, India, and became its first president in 1951. When the directorate of town planning was established, he became the Chief Town Planner, and later Director of Town Planning. He retired from the position in 1963.

His major projects in Hyderabad include the State Bank of Hyderabad building (1952), Gandhi Bhavan (1956), and Ravindra Bharathi (1961). His last major project was the new building of the Salar Jung Museum, completed in 1968.

== List of works ==
Name	Image	Year	Notes	Ref
Alhambra			Residence of the architect himself. Demolished in the 1990s	
Ali Yavar Jung mansion			Residence of Ali Yavar Jung	
Sayyid Naqi Bilgrami mansion				
Sarathi Studios building		1936	Residence of Maharaja Kishen Pershad	
State Bank of Hyderabad building		1952		
Gandhi Bhavan		1956		
Maulana Azad Library		1960		
Ravindra Bharathi		1961		
Salar Jung Museum building		1968		
