= Ravindra Bharathi =

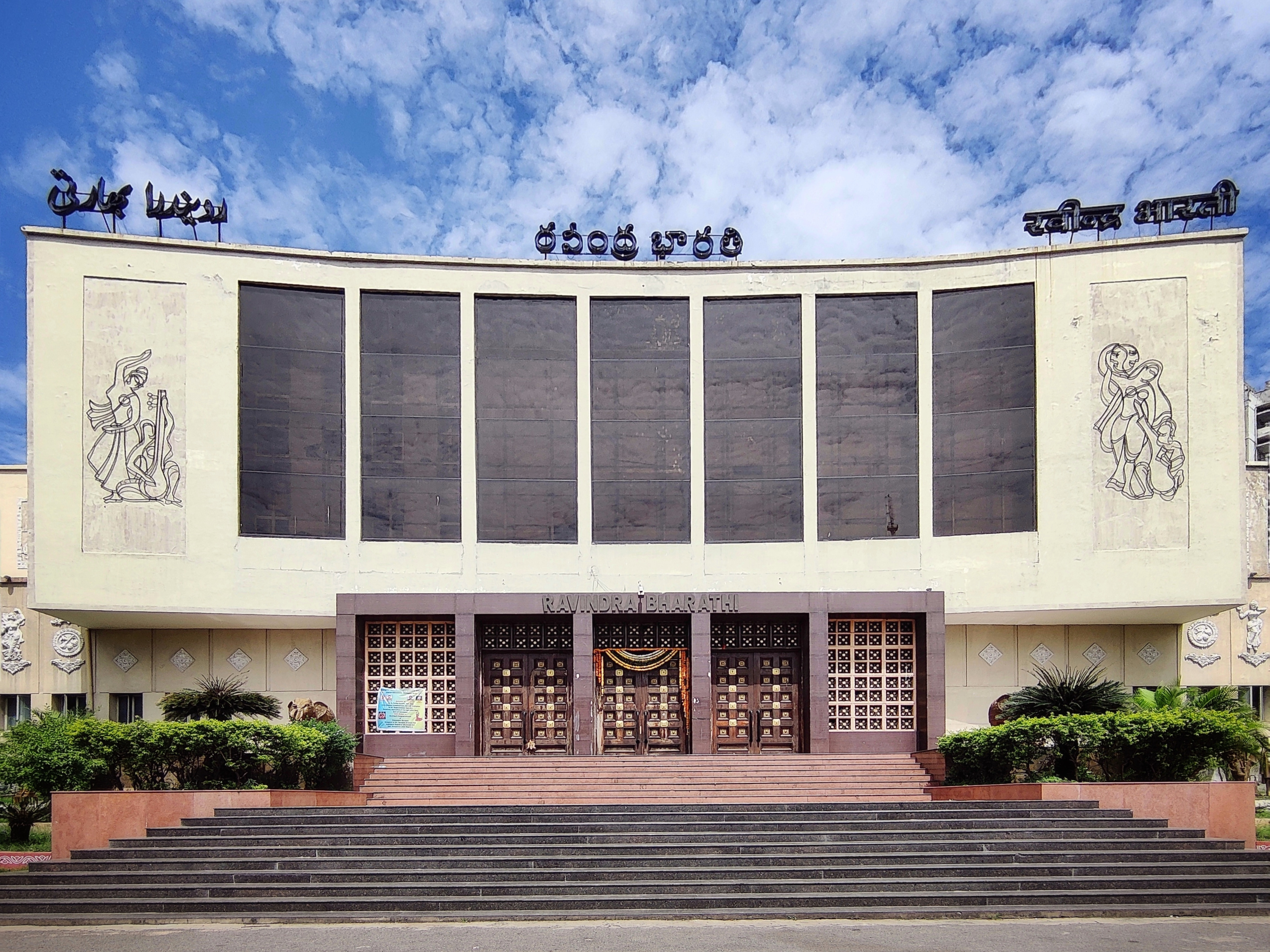
- Interactive map of the Ravindra Bharathi area

General information
- Type: Auditorium
- Architectural style: Ethnic
- Location: Hyderabad, Telangana, India
- Coordinates: 17.4033°N 78.4672°E
- Groundbreaking: 23 March 1960
- Opened: 11 May 1961

Design and construction
- Architect: Mohammed Fayazuddin
- Structural engineer: T.Veernath Rai

Ravindra Bharathi is an auditorium located in Hyderabad, Telangana, India. It was named after Rabindranath Tagore.

== History ==
On 23 March 1960, the then Governor of Uttar Pradesh and a former Chief minister of Andhra State, Bezawada Gopala Reddy laid the foundation stone of the auditorium. The building was designed by Mohammad Fayazuddin, an alumnus of Architectural Association School of Architecture, London. Built during the birth centenary celebrations of Rabindranath Tagore, the auditorium was constructed by the Government of Andhra Pradesh for over a year. On 11 May 1961, former President of India, Sarvepalli Radhakrishnan inaugurated it to serve the cultural needs of the region. The inaugural program was a performance of Tagore's Mukta Dhara (The Waterfall) under the auspices of the Osmania University Dramatic Club as part of the celebrations of Tagore's centenary.

== The auditorium ==
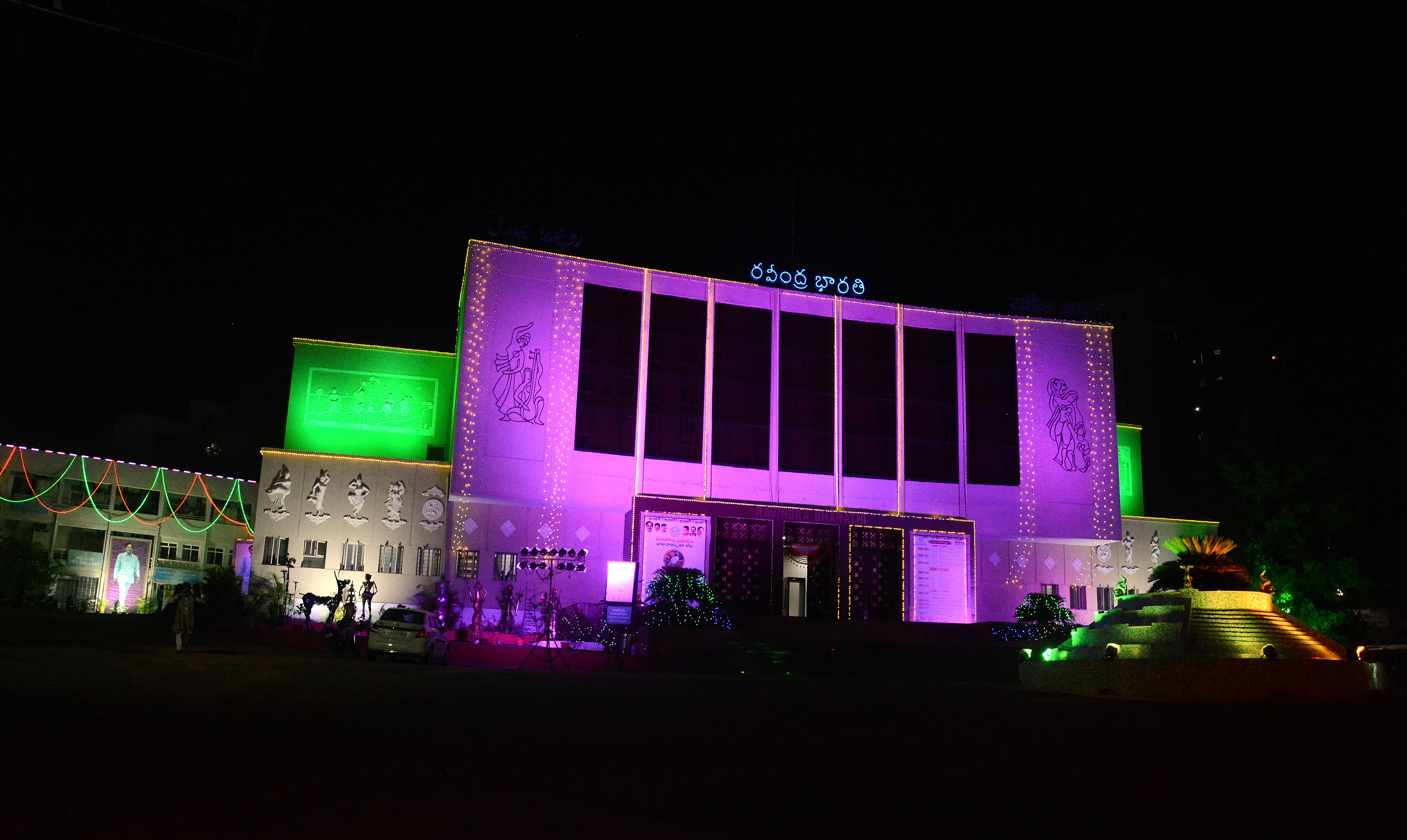
Ravindra Bharathi in Lighting on Telangana State Formation Day, 2018

The auditorium continued to be maintained by the Government of Andhra Pradesh. In 2005, renovation works were taken up after 44 years of its inauguration. As per that, the government spent ₹1.5 crore to improve the interiors, lighting, acoustics, air-conditioning, stage, green room. The seating area was totally refurbished to give state-of-the-art look to the auditorium. In addition, the building exteriors, landscaping, parking areas, food courts and other facilities were also improved. For the renovation, the auditorium was closed for a month.

On 11 May 2010, the golden jubilee celebrations of the auditorium were organised by the Government of Andhra Pradesh. The Department of Culture helped in organising Kuchipudi recitals by Shobha Naidu and her troupe, and a Bengali ballet by the local Bengali society. In addition, the celebrations featured playback singer Kavita Krishnamurthy and violinist L. Subramaniam.

== Facilities ==
The auditorium's facilities can be leased by the general public for cultural programs. In 1981, the Government of Andhra Pradesh instituted a Department of Culture and entrusted it with the administration of this auditorium.

The auditorium has a plinth area of 2,295 square yards (1,919 m^{2}) with a seating capacity of 1,104. The performing stage is 105 feet wide, 48 feet deep and 38 feet high.

In 2009, the state cabinet minister J. Geeta Reddy inaugurated the website of the auditorium. This facility was to make the process of booking easier.

The building consists of three floors—one main hall that can comfortably accommodate 1,000 people at once, and two others with a seating capacity of 150 and 112 people respectively. The centre is completely air-conditioned and Wi-Fi enabled.

== Events ==
A 125-day cultural festival in 2016, which included Burrakatha, Hairkatha, Oggukatha, Surabhi natakam, Girijana nrutyalu etc., created a record in the 58-year history of Ravindra Bharathi. Similarly, in 2018, "Salam-E-Telangana", the 30-day Urdu cultural events, which was the first-of-its-kind in the city.
