= Fish Prasadam =

Organised event in Hyderabad, India

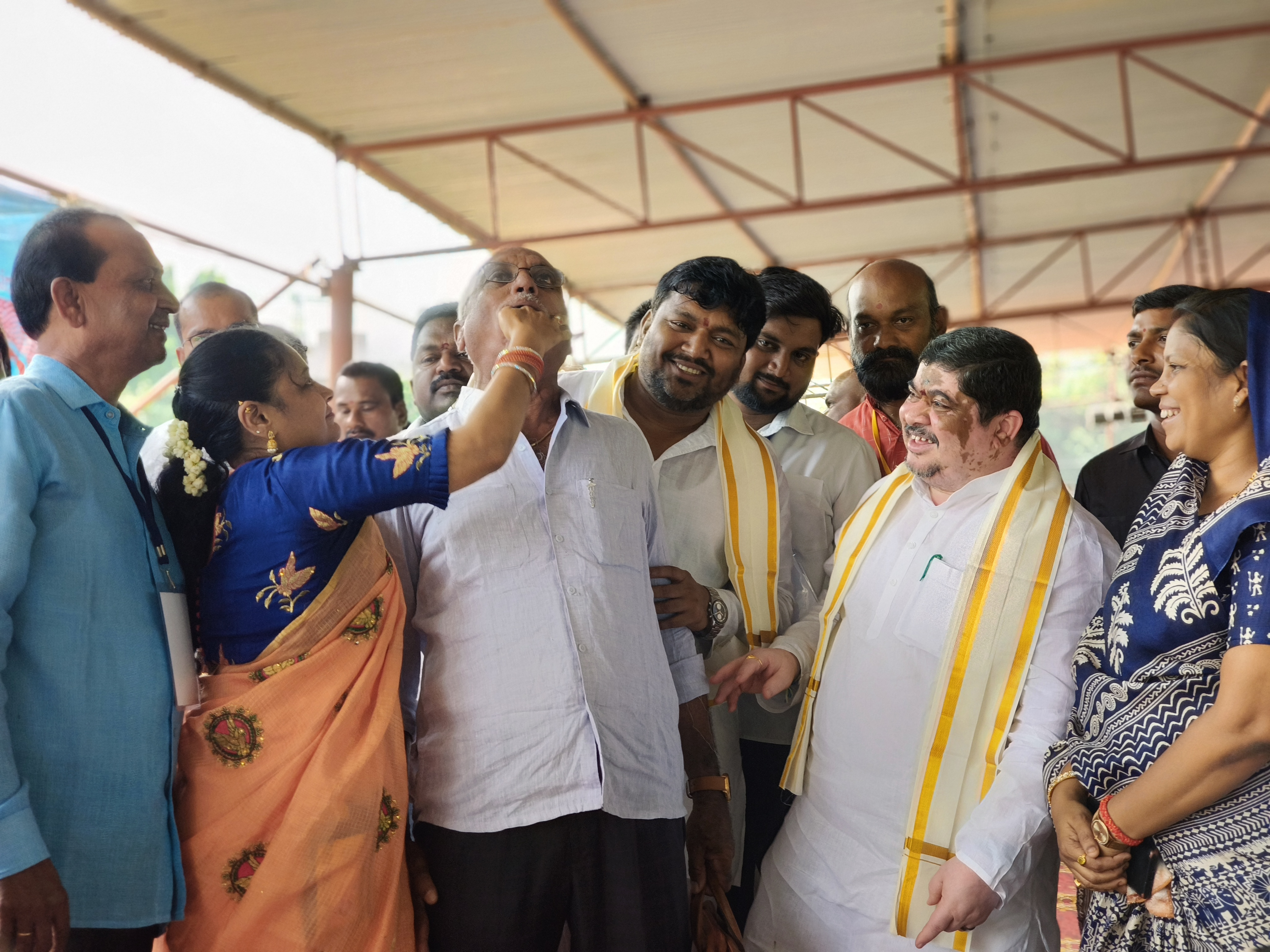
- Locations: Exhibition Grounds, Nampally, Hyderabad, Telangana, India
- Years active: 1845–present
- Organiser: Bathini family

Fish Prasadam is traditional remedy administered by the Bathini family of Hyderabad. Administration of this remedy happens at an event organized by the Bathini family, which has been held every year since 1845 on the auspicious day of Mrigasira Karthi, which marks the onset of the monsoon according to the Hindu calendar. The ritual involves the administration of a live murrel fish stuffed with a secret herbal paste, believed by many to be a traditional remedy for asthma and respiratory ailments.

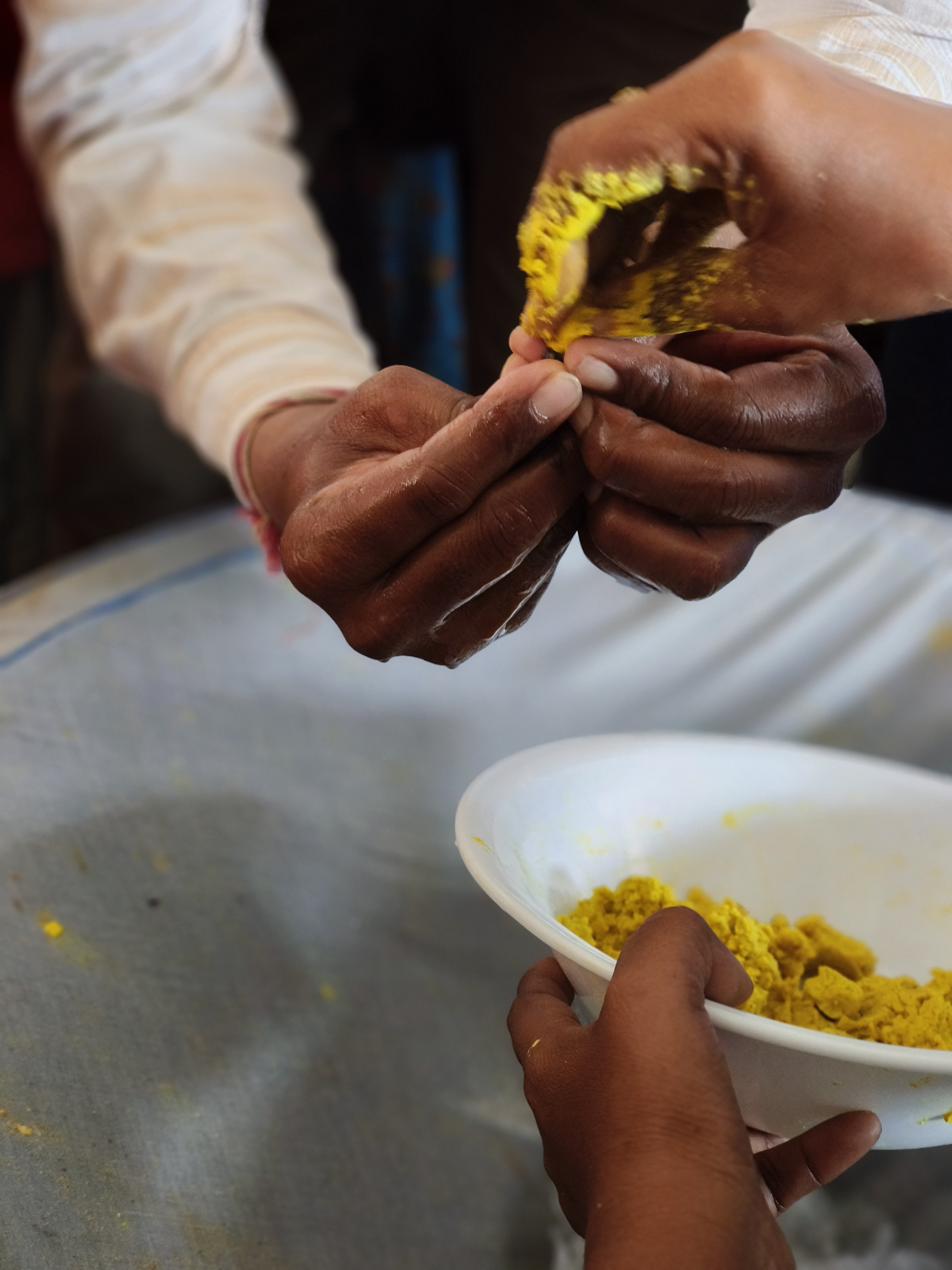
Batthini's Yellow herbal paste medicine

The members of the Bathini family drop a live murrel fish, filled with a yellow herbal paste, into the throats of patients suffering from respiratory illnesses. If the patient is a vegetarian, the medicine is given with Bellam (jaggery) instead of fish. Attendees are advised not to drink water until 30 minutes after the prasadam is consumed. They are also prescribed a particular diet and are asked to take the fish prasadam for three consecutive years.

After taking fish prasadam, one should take the extra quantity of medicine given, make six tablets out of it and dry them in shade. These tablets should be taken thrice over a period of 45 days, one on empty stomach in the morning and the other after dinner.

== History ==
On a stormy Mrigasira Karti night in the year 1845, a wandering soaking-wet holy mendicant from the Himalayas knocked on the door of the Bathini family. He was tired and hungry. The man of the house, Veeranna Goud, a toddy merchant, who always helped people in need, fed him, and gave him dry clothes and shelter for the night.

The next morning, when the sage was leaving the house, he whispered the secret formula of the fish cure for people with respiratory issues to Veeranna Goud. This secret fish recipe has been passed down the ages and currently, Veeranna’s great-grandsons the late Shivaram Goud, the late Somalingam Goud, Vishwanatham Goud, the late Harinath Goud and the late Uma Maheshwar Goud are honouring the legacy and distributing the fish prasadam.

For decades, the Goud family distributed the medicine in Doodh Bowli, Hyderabad but, during Chadrababu Naidu regime, the family was persuaded to do it on the sprawling Exhibition Grounds for proper crowd management.

In 2026 the Fish Prasadam distribution program held from 11 am on June 8 to 11 am on June 9.

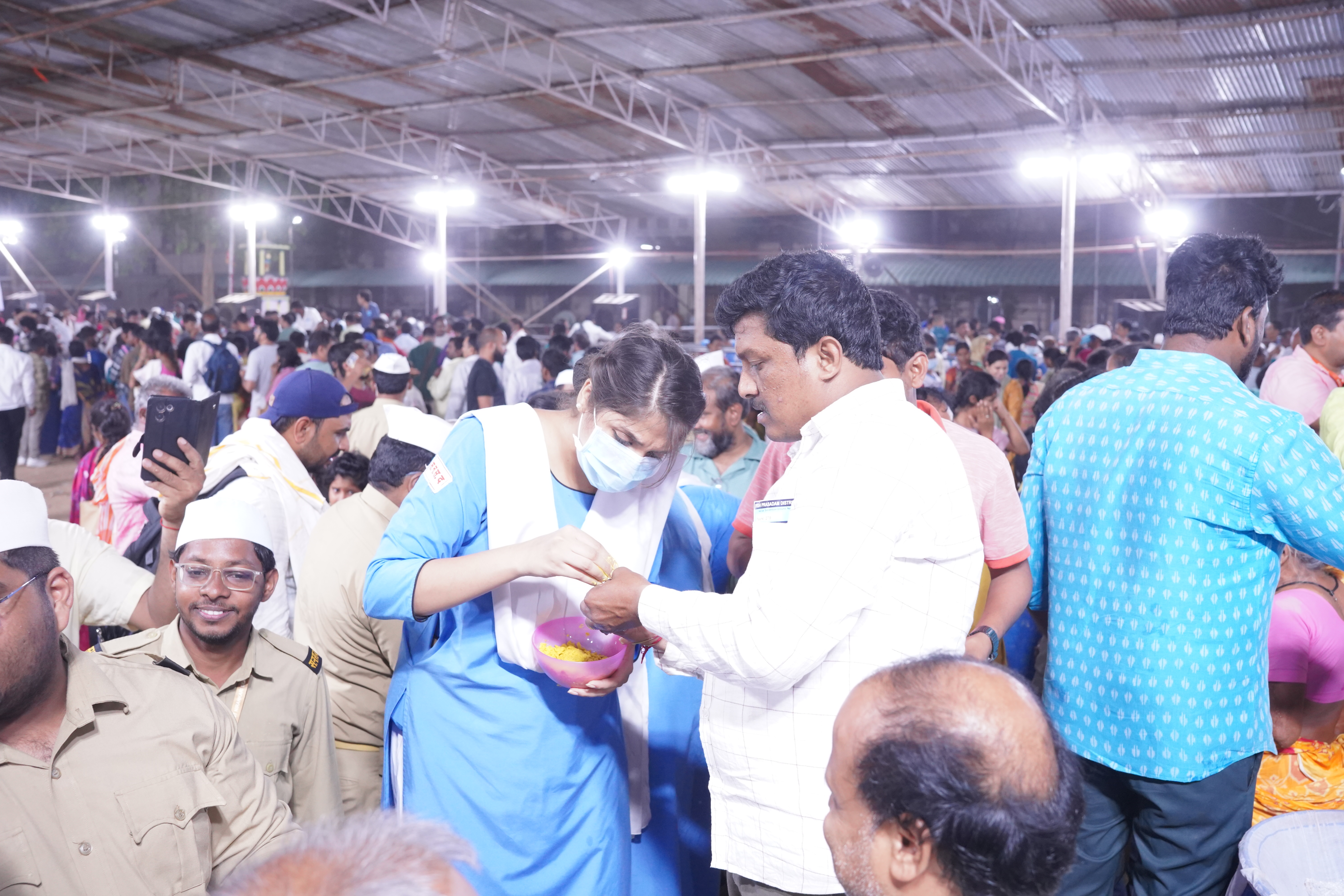
Fish Prasadam distribution 2026

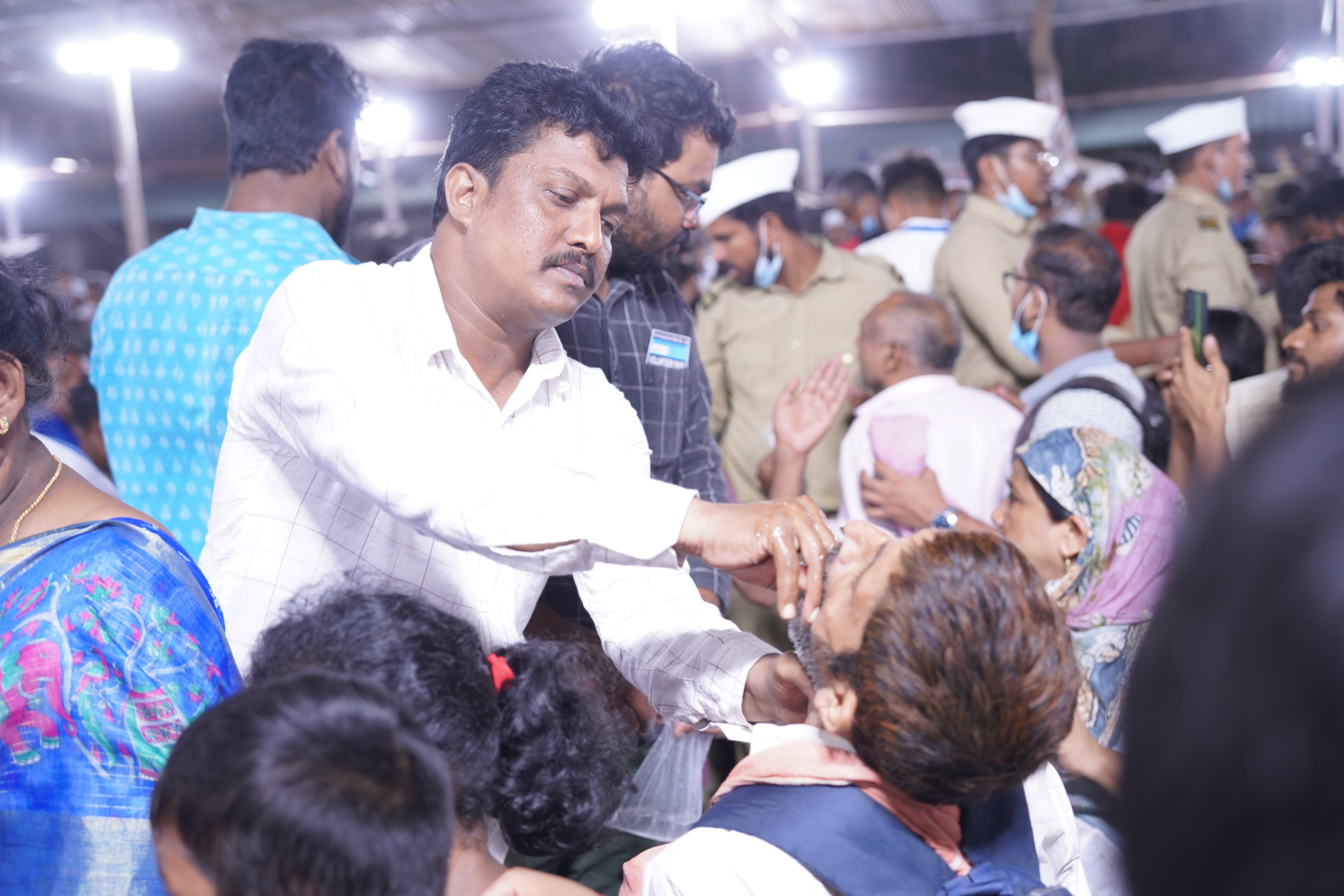
Administering the fish prasadam 2026

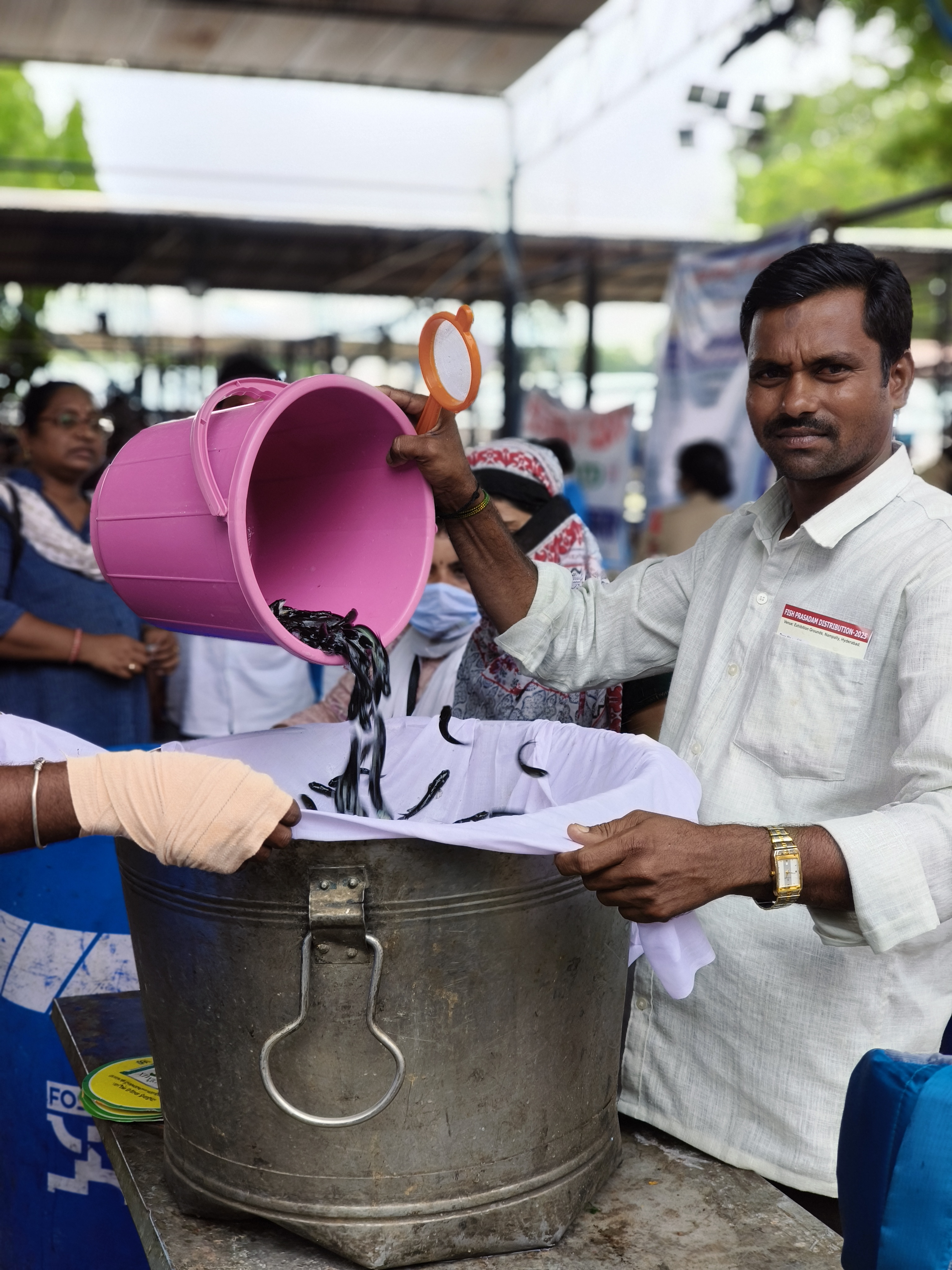
Live murrel fishes at fish prasadam
