= Government City College, Hyderabad =

Educational Institute in Hyderabad, India

Coordinates: 17.3686°N 78.4698°E

The City College of Hyderabad
- Type: Public
- Established: 4 September 1921; 104 years ago
- Founder: Mir Osman Ali Khan
- Affiliations: Osmania University
- Location: Hyderabad, Telangana, India
- Campus: Urban, 6 acres
- Website: https://gdctg.cgg.gov.in/charminar.edu
- Location in Government City College Location in Telangana Location in India
- Accredited with 'A++' Grade by NAAC with CGPA 3.67

Government City College (ప్రభుత్వ సిటీ కళాశాల) Hyderabad is an Under Graduate and Post-Graduate autonomous college located in Hyderabad. The campus is one of the oldest Heritage structures in Hyderabad. Government City College has been re-accredited with 'A++' grade and 3.67 CGPA by National Assessment and Accreditation Council in its IV Cycle. It has been conferred with autonomy by the University Grants Commission, Osmania University and the Telangana State Government since 2004. The college has adopted CBCS since the academic year 2014–15. Its centenary celebrations were observed with cultural programmes on 25, 26 and 27 August 2022.

== History ==
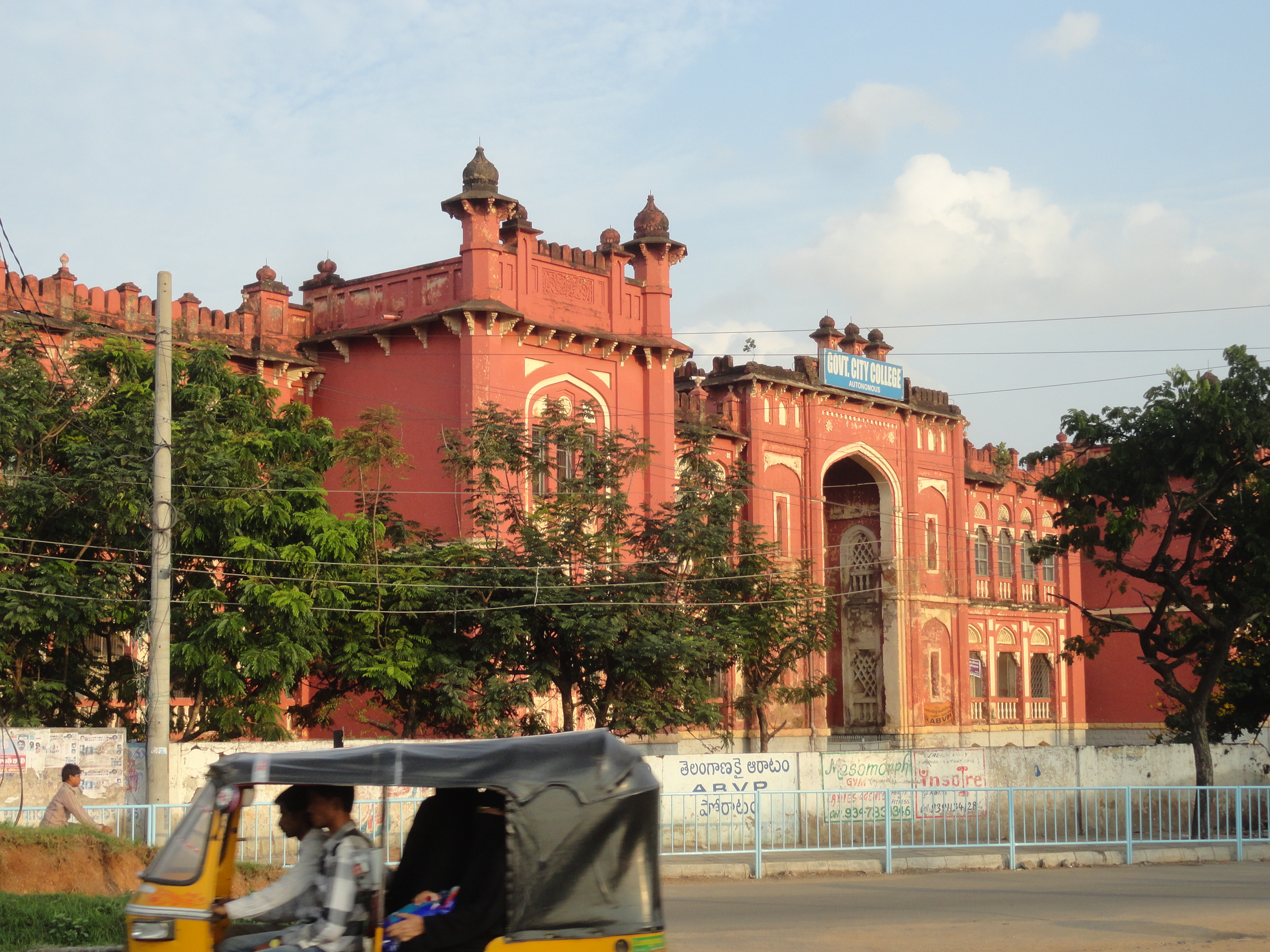
Old Administrative Building

The Nizam Mahbub Ali Khan, Asaf Jah VI of Hyderabad established the first city school in the name "Madarsa Dar-ul-uloom" as early as 1865, later Nizam Osman Ali Khan, Asaf Jah VII, converted it into a City High School. The school moved into the present grand building in 1921. Intermediate sections (F.A.) of Osmania University with 30 students were introduced in 1921 under the supervision of the high school with Urdu as the medium of instruction. In 1929, the school was upgraded to a college, named "City College" and made a constituent college of Osmania University. Its chief engineer was Nawab Khan Bahadur Mirza Akbar Baig.

The building housing the City College was established on 4 September 1921. British Architect Vincent Esch was commissioned by Hyderabad City Improvement Board to design and construct this building. The newly built building was initially used to house a school then known as Dar-ul-Uloom, and later in 1929 was converted into a college.

== Syllabus and changes of name ==
Consequent to the abolition of the Intermediate course (FA) in Osmania University in 1956, the Pre-University Course (PUC) was introduced. The Bachelor of Science courses were introduced in 1962 and the institution was named as "City Science College". City College was taken over by the government from Osmania University in 1965 and was renamed as Government City Science College. In 1967, B.A. and B.Com. courses were added and the college became "Government City College". The college offers more than 50 undergraduate programmes, including B.Sc, B.A., B.Com and BBA.

== Post Graduate Research Centre ==
The college was upgraded as a Research Center with the introduction of Master of Science Programs in Biotechnology, and Mathematics, in 2001 and 2003 respectively with 100% placement record. Physics, and Commerce were introduced in 2015 and 2016 respectively.

== Facilities and activities ==
- Central library which possesses rare books, Central Computing and Internet facilities.
- Cricket/football stadium, NCC and NSS.
- Health centre, grievances redressal cell, career guidance cell.
- B.R. Ambedkar Open University center, auditorium and Seminar Hall.
- State of the art Biotechnology lab, and field visits to Genome Valley.
- It also provides skill training at the TASK(Telangana Academy for Skill and Knowledge) lab.
- Various opportunities to study abroad and IELTS coaching at G-CELL.

== Architecture ==
Government City College was established in 1919 during the rule of the Nizam, Osman Ali Khan, Asaf Jah VII of erstwhile Hyderabad State. The campus is spread over 16 acres and the building is constructed on the banks of Musi River in the Indo-Saracenic style facing the open ground (now Quli Qutub Shah Stadium); the Telangana High Court is adjacent to the college. The college building has been declared a Heritage Monument by the Government of Telangana. It has been a pan-India film shooting hub.

== Notable alumni ==
- Shivraj Patil
- P. Shiv Shankar
- Marri Chenna Reddy
- Arshad Ayub
- M. Prabhakar Reddy
- Paruchuri Gopala Krishna
- J. K. Bharavi
- Muhammad Ali (actor)
- Mohammed Fayazuddin
- Syed Abdul Rahim

== See also ==
Osmania University, Hyderabad
