= Vincent Esch =

British architect (1876–1950)

Vincent Jerome Esch CVO
- Born: 10 July 1876; Blackheath, London, England
- Died: 9 December 1950 (aged 74); Surrey, England
- Occupation: Architect
- Awards: CVO
- Buildings: Victoria Memorial, Kolkata; Osmania General Hospital; Kacheguda railway station; City College Hyderabad; Hyderabad High Court

Vincent Jerome Esch, CVO, FRIBA (20 July 1876 – 9 December 1950) was a British architect who worked in India. He is regarded as a pioneer of the Indo-Saracenic architectural style, which developed during the British rule in the Indian subcontinent.

Born in London, he moved to India in 1898, and was appointed assistant engineer on the Bengal Nagpur Railway before setting himself up as an architect in Calcutta.

In 1914, he was invited to Hyderabad by the Nizam, to design some major public buildings. He designed the Kacheguda railway station, the High Court, the City College, and the Osmania General Hospital in Hyderabad. He was in Hyderabad until 1921, then returned to Calcutta. He later returned to England, and died in 1950.

== Early life and background ==
He was born the son of C.A. Bernard Esch, a merchant banker of Blackheath, London and educated at Mount St Mary's College. He then trained as an architect in London.

== Career ==
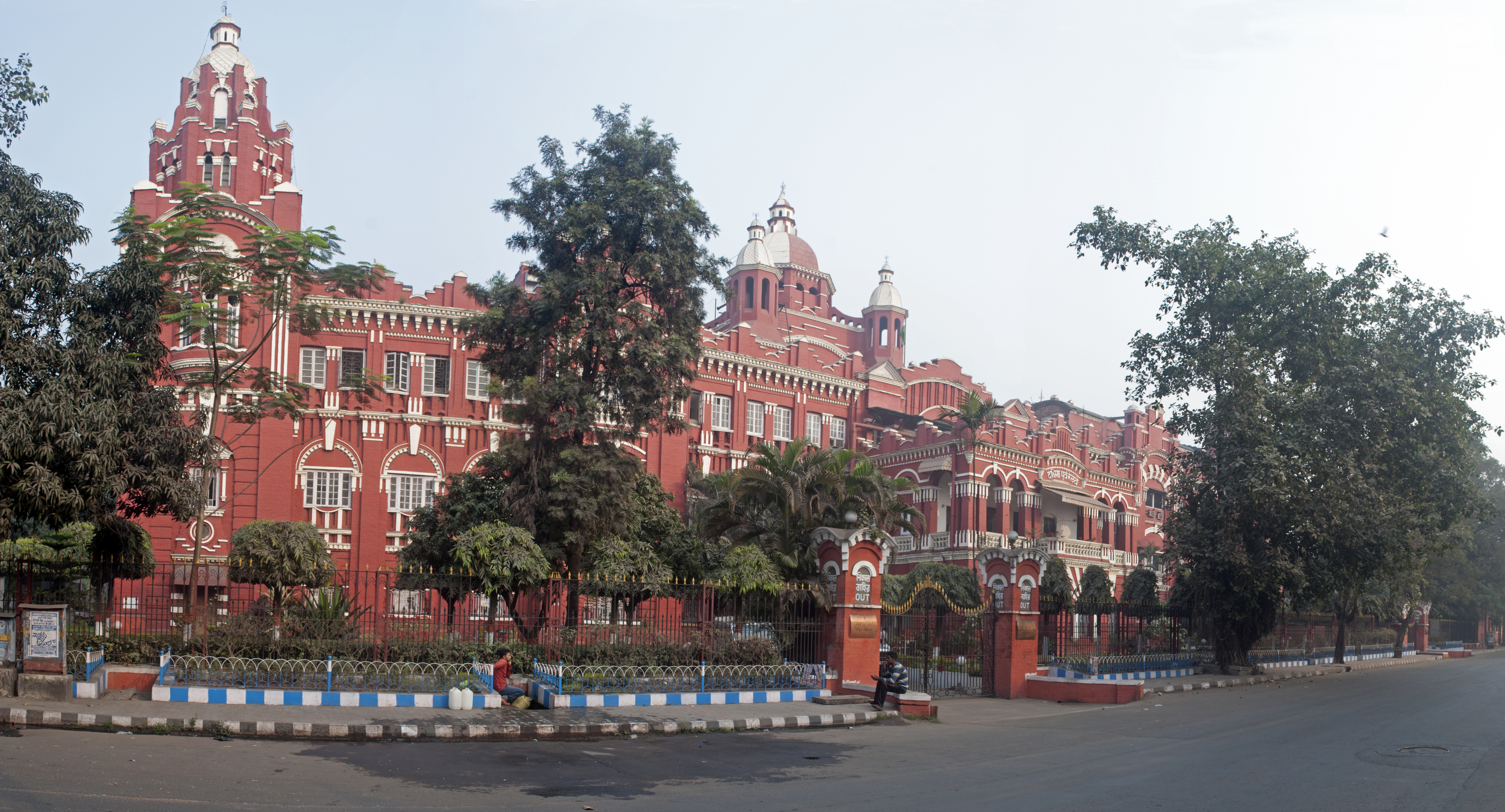
Bengal-Nagpur Railway Headquarters

=== Early career ===
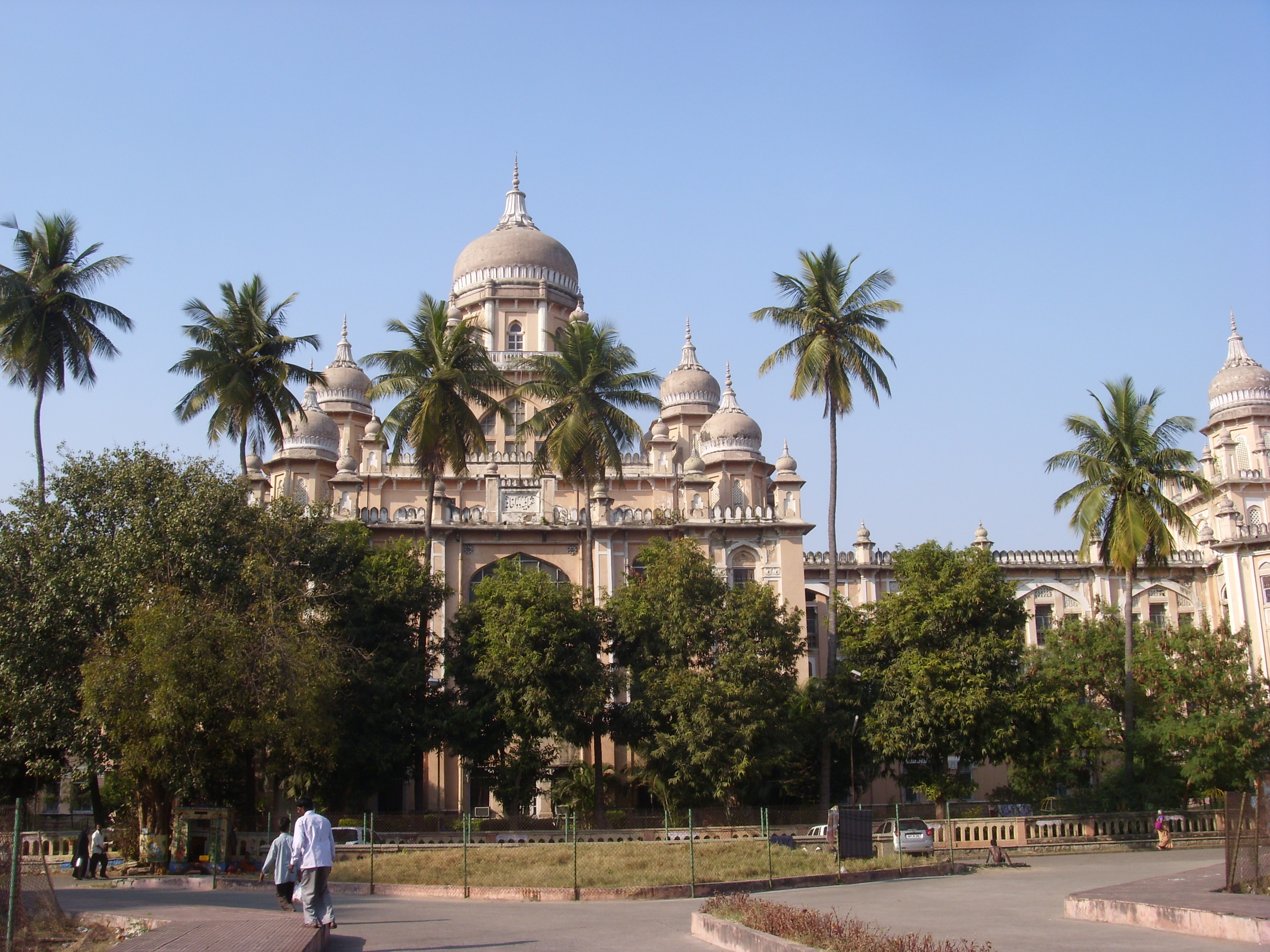
Osmania General Hospital, Hyderabad

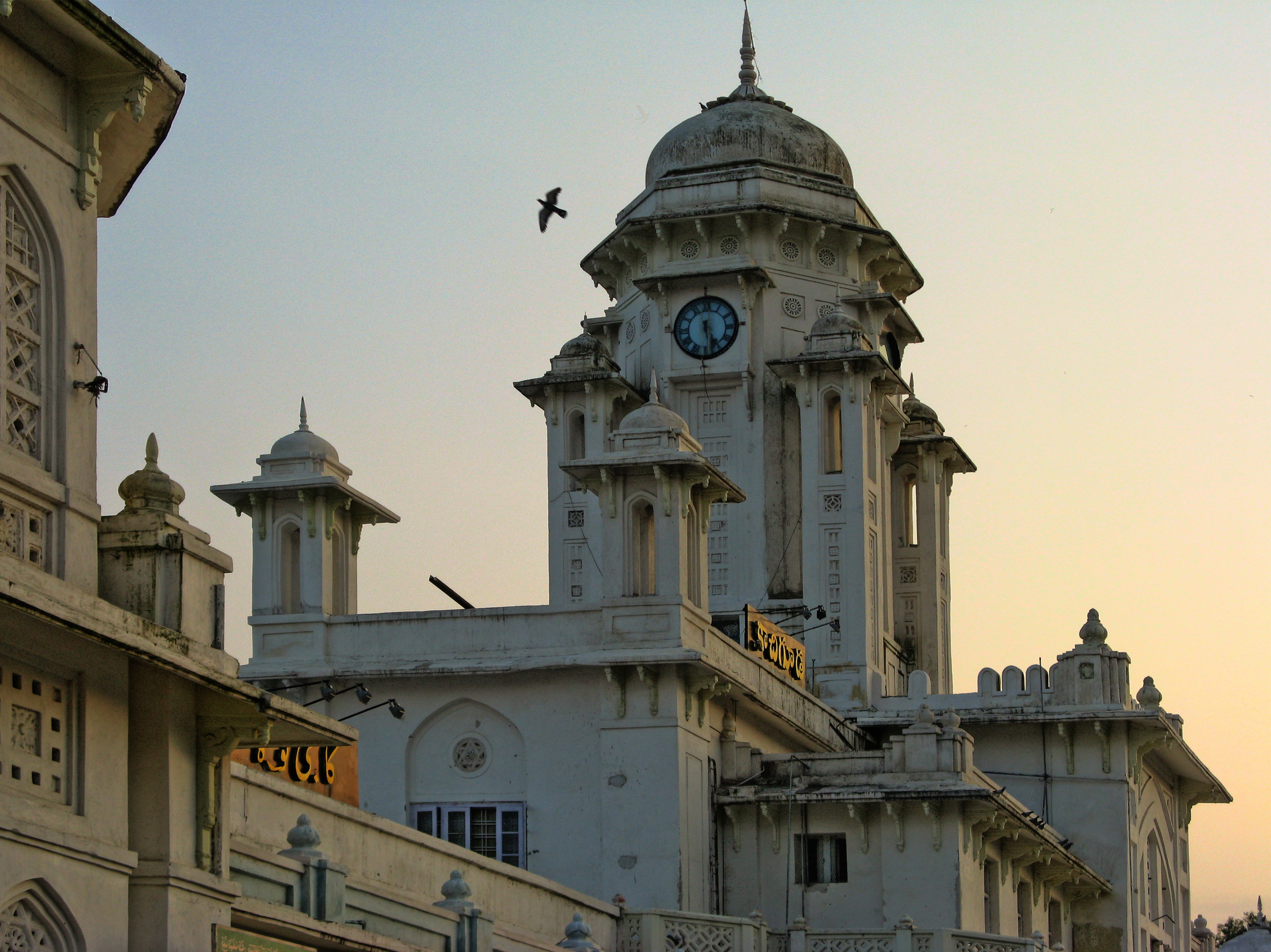
Kacheguda Railway Station

Esch moved to India in 1898 and was appointed assistant engineer on the Bengal Nagpur Railway and also established a private practise in Calcutta (now Kolkata). During this period he designed some of the important building in the city such as the Allahabad Bank, the Temple ChamberVis, the Royal Calcutta Turf Club and Bengal Club. After designing the temporary exhibition building for the Delhi Durbar of 1903, he was employed as an assistant architect to Sir William Emerson, who had been chosen to design the monumental Victoria Memorial Hall in Calcutta. Esch was given the role of Superintending Architect and made major contributions to the design of the building. He had also won a competition to design the Bengal-Nagpur Railway head office building at Garden Reach.

Buildings designed by Esch in Calcutta respected the inherent architectural vocabulary of Calcutta and followed an architectural style of restrained classicism, he preferred the use of iconic order. However, while designing of Bengal-Nagpur Railway head office he included regional architectural elements like bengal roofs and jharokha. Similar concept is applied to Victoria Memorial Kolkata by Esch by introducing small domes (Chhatris) in the four corners and around the central dome. Esch describes this addition in his paper in the following words:

"The style of design is purist classic with a refined suggestion of Indian character in the beautiful carved brackets to maintain cornice, some of the floral decoration and the shape of the smaller dome"

Another important contribution of Esch to widely use concrete in the buildings for structural purposes. In Victoria Memorial he replaced the intended deep foundation with concrete and in Allahabad precast concrete is used for superstructure as well.

=== Career in Hyderabad - Vincent Esch and Indo-Saracenic Movement ===
After the Great Musi Floods of 1908 in Hyderabad a city improvement board was set up for the development and beautification of Hyderabad. By this time Esch was a well established architect in calcutta with prominent works under his name, further he was employed by Nizam Mir Osman Ali Khan in Hyderabad as an architect on the board. Most prominent works of Esch are from Hyderabad and here he took forward the concept of Indo-Saracenic architecture in Hyderabad which was already popular in other cities of the country like Baroda and Allahabad

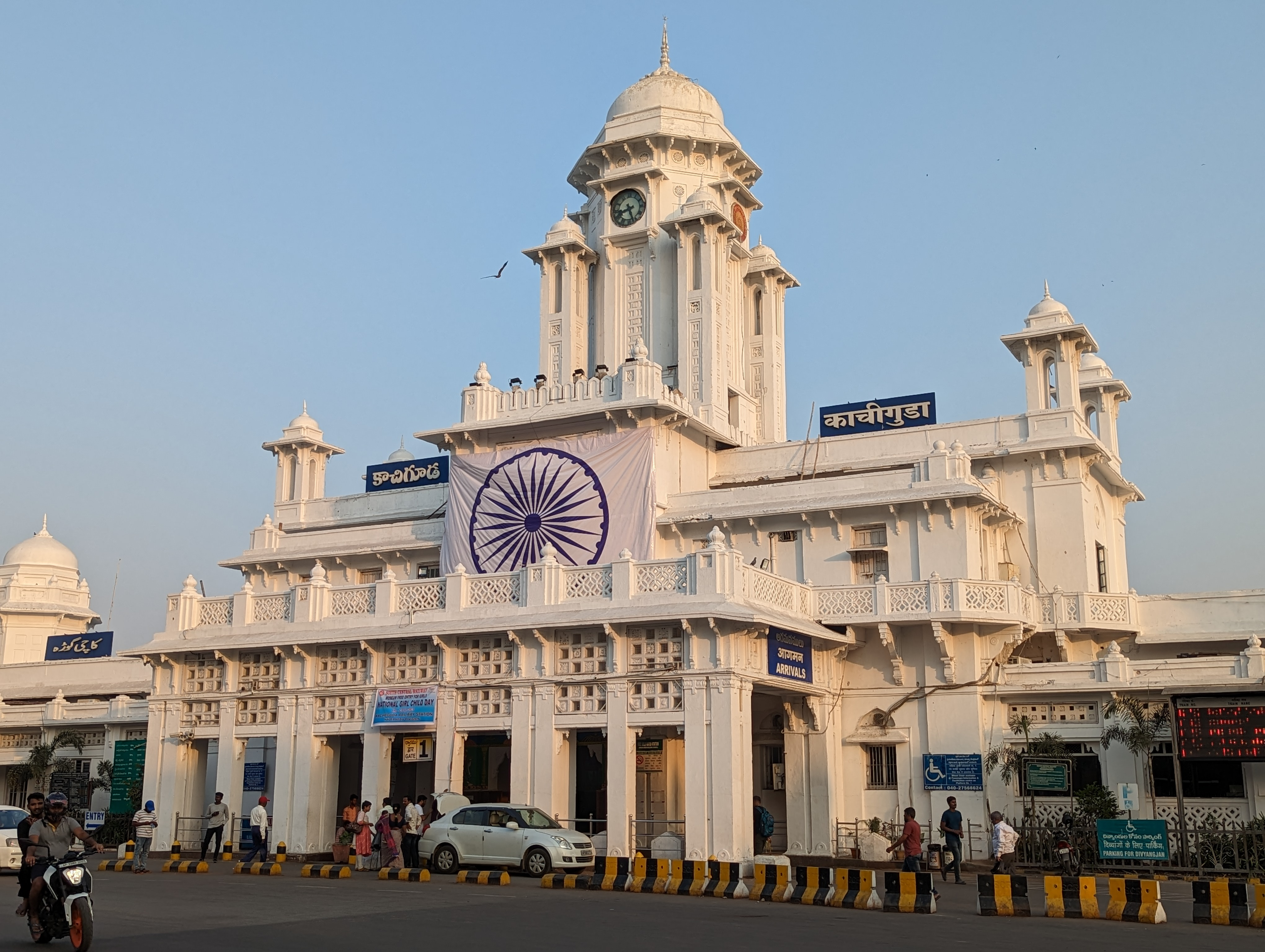
Facade of Kacheguda Railway Station showing chatri chajja (eaves) and jali (lattice screen)

Four prominent works of Esch in Hyderabad are the Kachiguda railway station (1914), the High Court (1916), the City College (1917–20), and the large Osmania General Hospital (1918–21). The latter is now threatened with demolition.

==== Kacheguda Railway Station ====
Kachiguda Railway Station was Esch's first project in Hyderabad. He continued his approach to explore modern technology like concrete and the station is entirely built of concrete. In terms of design unlike Calcutta, Esch uses several Indian architectural element, Chajja (eaves) Jalis (lattice screen) domes with lotus top, finials and brackets, which is very evident in the facade of the building. The amalgamation of modern technology with traditional Indian or Islamic elements is termed as "mogul Saracenic" by Esch and his contemporaries.

=== Later career ===
Esch enjoyed 25 years of success as an architect in Calcutta, where he became a proponent of the Indo-Saracenic style, a fusion of classical and Islamic styles. In 1922 he was made CVO.

== Return to England and death ==
He later returned to England and died in Surrey in late 1950.

== Personal life ==
He had married Olive Edward in 1923 and had one son and one daughter.
