= Nampally metro station =

Metro station in Hyderabad, India

Nampally
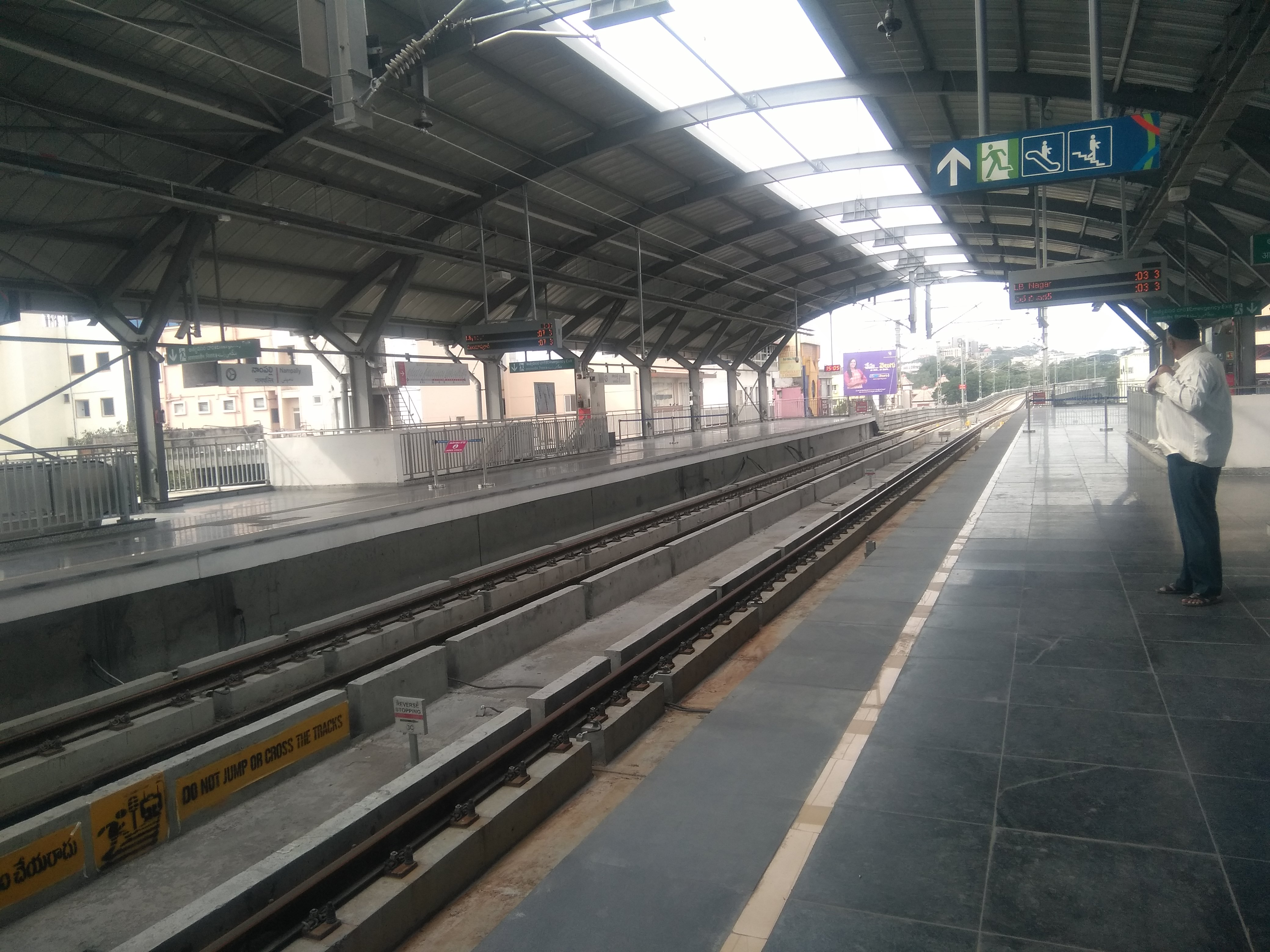

General information
- Location: Nampally, Hyderabad
- Coordinates: 17.4367°N 78.4674°E
- System: Hyderabad Metro station
- Line: Red Line
- Platforms: 2
- Tracks: 2
- Connections: Hyderabad Deccan

Construction
- Structure type: Elevated
- Depth: 7.07 m (23.2 ft)
- Platform levels: 2

History
- Opened: 24 September 2018; 7 years ago

Services
| Preceding station | Hyderabad Metro | Following station |
|---|---|---|
| Assembly towards Miyapur | Red Line | Gandhi Bhavan towards LB Nagar |
Location

The Nampally metro station is located on the Red Line of the Hyderabad Metro, in India. Nampally Metro station will be connected with Nampally railway station 200 mts away with a covered walkway and railing.

== History ==
It was opened on 24 September 2018.

== Facilities ==
Nampally metro station will be connected to Moazzam Jahi Market. A state of-the-art automated multi-level parking complex called ‘Novum’, spread over 15 floors and a total area of 2,000 sq metre is being built near Nampally Metro station.

== Station layout ==
Street Level
This is the first level where passengers may park their vehicles and view the local area map.

Concourse level
Ticketing office or Ticket Vending Machines (TVMs) is located here. Retail outlets and other facilities like washrooms, ATMs, first aid, etc., will be available in this area.

Platform level
This layer consists of two platforms. Trains takes passengers from this level.

| G | Street level | Exit/Entrance |
| L1 | Mezzanine | Fare control, station agent, Metro Card vending machines, crossover |
| L2 | Side platform | Doors will open on the left |
| L2 | Platform 1 Southbound | Towards → Vasavi LB Nagar next station is Gandhi Bhavan |
| L2 | Platform 2 Northbound | Towards ← Miyapur next station is Assembly |
| L2 | Side platform | Doors will open on the left |
| L2 |
