= Gandhi Bhavan, Hyderabad =

Gandhi Bhavan is the headquarters of the Indian National Congress Party in Nampally, Hyderabad, Telangana. It is situated near Exhibition Grounds, Nampally. The place is very commonly used as a landmark in Hyderabad. Mr. Khan Bahadur Abdul Karim Babukhan, father of Mr. Bashiruddin Babukhan & Narala Saikiran Mudiraj, had constructed Gandhi Bhavan some 50 years ago and donated to congress party.

== History ==
On 7 October 1950, Sardar Patel laid the foundation of the Gandhi Bhavan. The building was designed by Mohammed Fayazuddin. It was inaugurated by Rajendra Prasad on 8 July 1956.
