= Osmania General Hospital =

- Government of Telangana
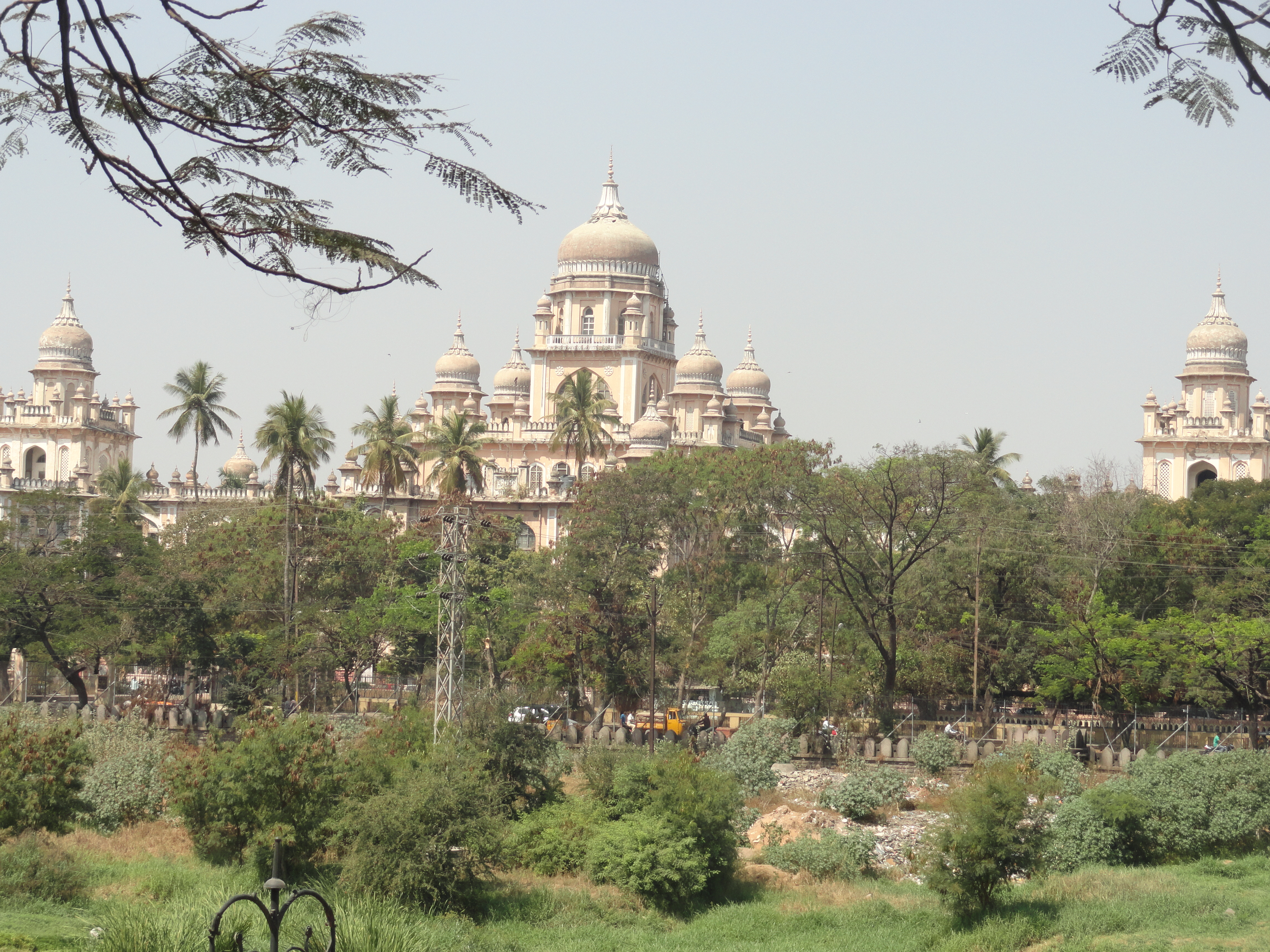

Geography
- Location: Hyderabad, Telangana, India
- Coordinates: 17.372°N 78.474°E

Organisation
- Affiliated university: Kaloji Narayana Rao University of Health Sciences

Services
- Emergency department: Yes
- Beds: 1168

Helipads
- Helipad: No

History
- Opened: 20 April 1910; 116 years ago

Links
- Website: osmaniageneralhospital.org
- Lists: Hospitals in India

Osmania General Hospital (OGH) is one of the oldest hospitals in India located at Afzal Gunj, Hyderabad. It is named after its founder – Mir Osman Ali Khan, the last Nizam of Hyderabad. It is run by the Government of Telangana, and is one of the largest healthcare facilities in the state. It was built at a cost of ₹2,00,00,000.

The hospital building, a heritage structure is in dire need of repair and renovation. The building has been included in 2025 World Monuments Watch compiled by World Monuments Fund

== History ==
The Afzal Gunj Hospital, the predecessor of the Osmania General Hospital, was established in 1866 by Salar Jung I.

The present hospital building was completed in 1919 on orders of the last Nizam of Hyderabad, Mir Osman Ali Khan. It was designed by British architect Vincent Jerome Esch and Nawab Khan Bahadur Mirza Akbar Baig in Indo-Sarcenic style. In 1926, the wards of the Afzal Gunj hospital were transferred to the new building. It was the tallest building in Hyderabad until 1987, when it was surpassed by the Babukhan Estate.

Dr. Yusuf Mirza, the hospital's first resident medical officer (RMO). One of the doctors who started along with the RMO Dr. K Gopal Rao. Names of these doctors are still there at the General Ward entrance.

In 2015, the Chief Minister of Telangana, K. Chandrashekhar Rao announced a plan to demolish the building. Following outrage among heritage activists, he immediately retracted the statement.

Himayat Ali Mirza, the great-grandson of Mir Osman Ali Khan, joined hands to improve the building's condition, with the INTACH (Indian National Trust for Arts and Cultural Heritage). He believes minor renovations could improve the hospital building to restore the Osmania General Hospital.

== Facilities ==
The hospital has more than a thousand beds.

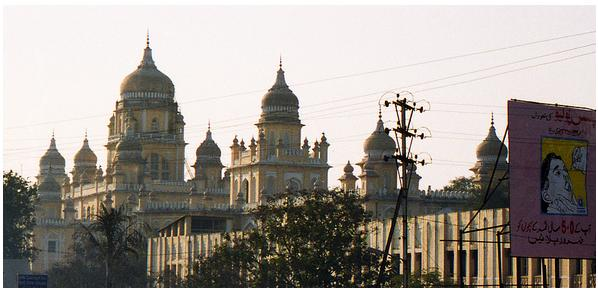
Osmania General Hospital Hyderabad

== New Building ==
The new building of Osmania General Hospital to be located at Goshamahal in 26 acres of land, and foundation stone was laid by Chief Minister A.Revanth Reddy along with Health Minister Damodar Raja Narasimha on 31 January 2025. It will be built on a 32 lakh square feet built up area and will have 2,000 beds.

This new hospital will replace the aging Osmania General Hospital, which has been in operation since 1910 and is struggling with outdated infrastructure. Despite concerns over the relocation of the hospital and its potential impact on local heritage, the government is moving forward with the plan to modernize healthcare facilities in Hyderabad.

However, the proposed relocation of the hospital has faced significant opposition from local residents and heritage activists. Concerns raised include the potential environmental impact of the new facility and the loss of a community space. Additionally, there are fears about the potential loss of the heritage value of the original Osmania General Hospital building. Legal challenges to the relocation have been filed, and the Telangana High Court issued notices regarding the proposed move in 2024.

== See also ==
- Osmania Medical College
- Osmania College, Kurnool
- Hospitals established in Hyderabad State
