= Corridor IV (Hyderabad Metro) =

Proposed Hyderabad metro line

Overview
- Locale: Hyderabad, Telangana, India
- Termini: Nagole; RGIA
- Stations: 24

Service
- Type: Metro
- System: Hyderabad Metro
- Operator: Hyderabad Metro Rail Ltd. (HMRL)
- Depot: TBD

Technical
- Line length: 36.6 km (22.7 mi)
- Character: Elevated & underground

Corridor IV or the Airport Line is a proposed line serving Hyderabad as part of the Hyderabad Metro rail network in the city. The line spans 36.6 km (22.7 mi). It starts at Nagole and ends at the Rajiv Gandhi International Airport, going through crucial areas such as LB Nagar, Owiasi Hospitals, Chandrayangutta, New High Court, and Shamshabad. There are 24 stations, 23 of which are proposed to be elevated, with the airport station being the only underground station. Its current proposal includes connections with Blue Line at Nagole, Red Line at LB Nagar and Green Line at Chandrayangutta. As of October 2026, there is no Union government’s nod on the DPR.

== History ==
After the opening of Phase I one of the major complaints was the crucial areas of Nagole and LB Nagar not being connected, despite Nagole and LB Nagar being the terminus points for the Blue and the Red line respectively. The state government looked at the options of extending the metro from Nagole to LB Nagar, but this proposal was soon rejected by the central government, citing low ridership expectation. This was soon criticized by the state government, which alleged favouritism over metro project approvals, causing tensions between the two.

During the same time, there were rising calls for metro connectivity to the airport. For this reason on 26 March 2018, a special purpose vehicle company, Hyderabad Airport Metro Limited (HAML), was established by the Government of Telangana to develop the Hyderabad Airport Metro Express. Later the government released tenders for the construction of the line and aimed to began construction in 2024. However, following the change of the government due to the 2023 Telangana Legislative Assembly election, Revanth Reddy put the line on hold and ordered a redesign of the line. He later announced the airport express line was being put on hold and introduced the metro Phase II where a new airport line was designed which started from Nagole instead of Raidurg. The line would connect the highly requested Nagole LB Nagar route and extend towards Old city and finally the airport.

== Finances ==
Unlike Phase I, which followed a private-public-partnership between Larsen&Turbo and the government of Telangana, the government of Telangana decided to pursue a joint venture with the Indian Central Government for Phase II of Hyderabad Metro. Out of the required money which will be contributed by the government, the state government and central government will each contribute 50%. The remainder of the money will be borrowed from various banks at a low interest rate. The total cost of Phase II is estimated to be Rs 24,237 crore.

== Stations ==
=== Interchanges ===
Passenger interchange facilities, connecting to other metro and railway lines, will be provided at the following stations:

- Nagole (connects to the Blue Line, which runs between Miyapur and LB Nagar)
- LB Nagar (connects to the Red Line, which runs between Raidurg and Nagole)
- Chandrayangutta (connects to the Green Line, which runs between JBS Parade Ground and Falaknuma)

=== List of stations ===
Corridor IV
| # | Station name | | Opened | Connections | Alignment |
| # | English | Telugu | Opened | Connections | Alignment |
|---|---|---|---|---|---|
| 1 | Nagole | నాగోల్ | Proposed | Blue Line | Elevated |
| 2 | Alkapuri Junction | అల్కాపురి జంక్షన్ | Proposed | None | Elevated |
| 3 | Kamineni Hospitals | కామినేని హాస్పిటల్స్ | Proposed | None | Elevated |
| 4 | Nagole X Road | నాగోల్ ఎక్స్ రోడ్ | Proposed | None | Elevated |
| 5 | LB Nagar | ఎల్ బి నగర్ | Proposed | Red Line | Elevated |
| 6 | Bairamalguda | బైరామల్గూడ | Proposed | None | Elevated |
| 7 | Maitri Nagar | మైత్రి నగర్ | Proposed | None | Elevated |
| 8 | Karmanghat | కరిమేన్‌ఘాట్ | Proposed | None | Elevated |
| 9 | Champapet Road | చంపాపేట్ రోడ్ | Proposed | None | Elevated |
| 10 | Owaisi Hospitals | ఒవైసి హాస్పిటల్స్ | Proposed | None | Elevated |
| 11 | DRDO | డి ఆర్ డి ఓ | Proposed | None | Elevated |
| 12 | Balapur Road | బాలాపూర్ రోడ్ | Proposed | None | Elevated |
| 13 | Chandrayangutta | చాంద్రాయణగుట్ట | Proposed | Green Line | Elevated |
| 14 | Bandlaguda Road | బండ్లగూడ రోడ్ | Proposed | None | Elevated |
| 15 | Mailardevpally | మైలార్‌దేవ్‌పల్లి | Proposed | None | Elevated |
| 16 | Katedan | కాటేదాన్ | Proposed | None | Elevated |
| 17 | Aramghar | ఆరామ్ఘర్ | Proposed | None | Elevated |
| 18 | New High Court | కొత్త హైకోర్టు | Proposed | None | Elevated |
| 19 | Gaganpahad | గగన్‌పహాడ్ | Proposed | None | Elevated |
| 20 | Satamrai | సతామ్రాయి | Proposed | None | Elevated |
| 21 | Siddanthi | సిద్దంతి | Proposed | None | Elevated |
| 22 | Shamshabad | శంషాబాద్ | Proposed | None | Elevated |
| 23 | Cargo | కార్గో | Proposed | None | Elevated |
| 24 | RGIA | ఆర్ జి ఐ ఎ | Proposed | None | Underground |
