= Habsiguda metro station =

Metro station in Hyderabad, India

Habsiguda
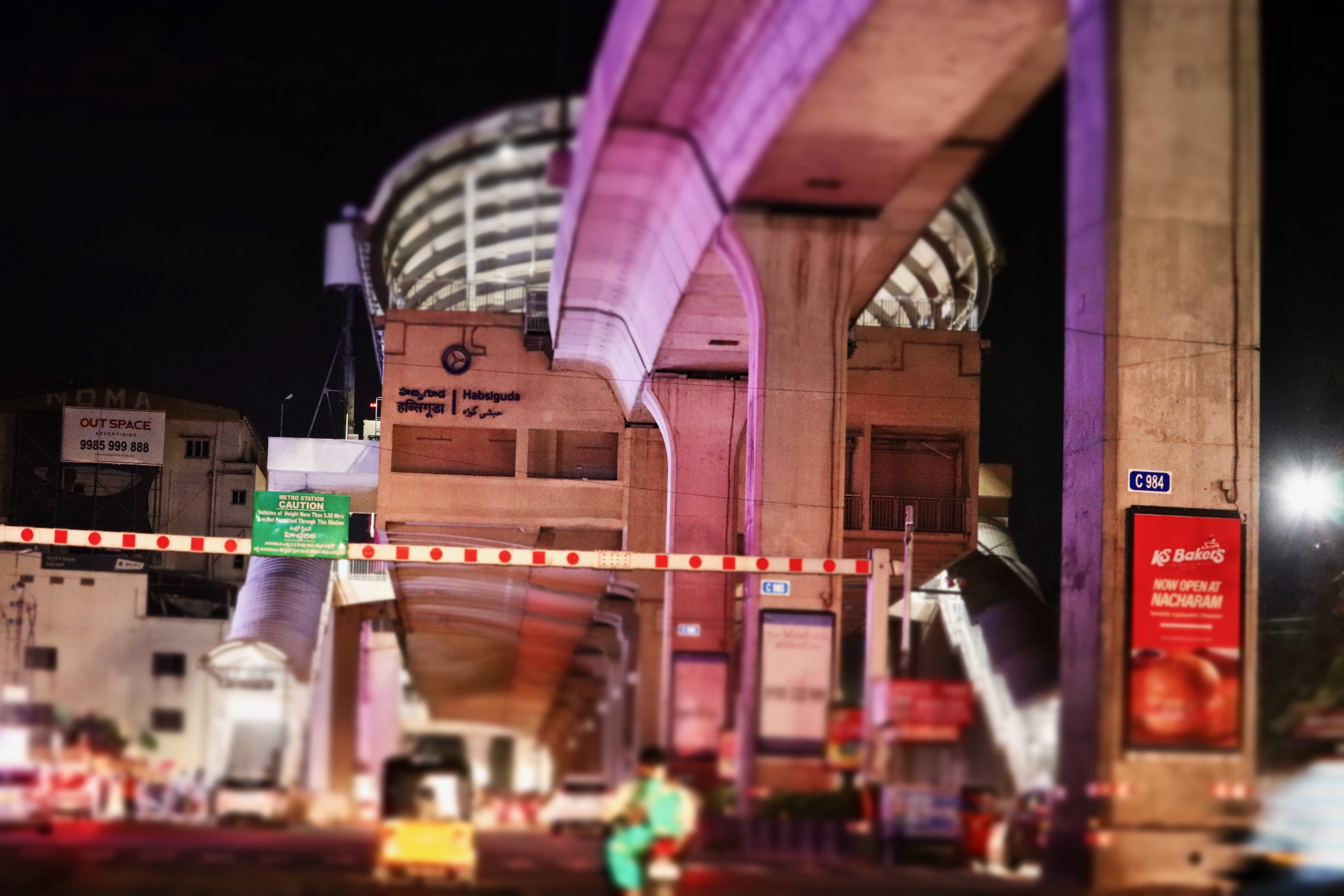

General information
- Coordinates: 17.4337°N 78.5016°E
- System: Hyderabad Metro station
- Line: Blue Line
- Tracks: 4

Construction
- Structure type: Elevated
- Depth: 7.07 m (23.2 ft)
- Platform levels: 2

History
- Opened: 28 November 2017

Services
Preceding station	Hyderabad Metro	Following station
Tarnaka towards Raidurg	Blue Line	NGRI towards Nagole
Location

The Habsiguda Metro Station is located on the Blue Line of the Hyderabad Metro, in India. It is part of Corridor III of the Hyderabad Metro starting from Nagole and towards HITECh city and was opened to the public on 28 November 2017.
