= Secunderabad metro station =

Secunderabad metro station may refer to:

- Secunderabad East metro station, on the Hyderabad Metro Blue Line
- Secunderabad West metro station, on the Hyderabad Metro Green Line
