= Tarnaka metro station =

Metro station in Hyderabad, India

General information
- Location: Tarnaka, Hyderabad, India
- Coordinates: 17.4279°N 78.5360°E
- System: Hyderabad Metro station
- Line: Blue Line
- Tracks: 4

Construction
- Structure type: Elevated
- Platform levels: 2

History
- Opened: 28 November 2017

Services
Preceding station	Hyderabad Metro	Following station
Mettuguda towards Raidurg	Blue Line	Habsiguda towards Nagole
Location

The Tarnaka metro station is located on the Blue Line of the Hyderabad Metro India. There are taxi and bike rental services are available. There are free metro feeder services from Tarnaka metro station to ECIL.
