= Mettuguda metro station =

Metro station in Hyderabad, India

Mettuguda
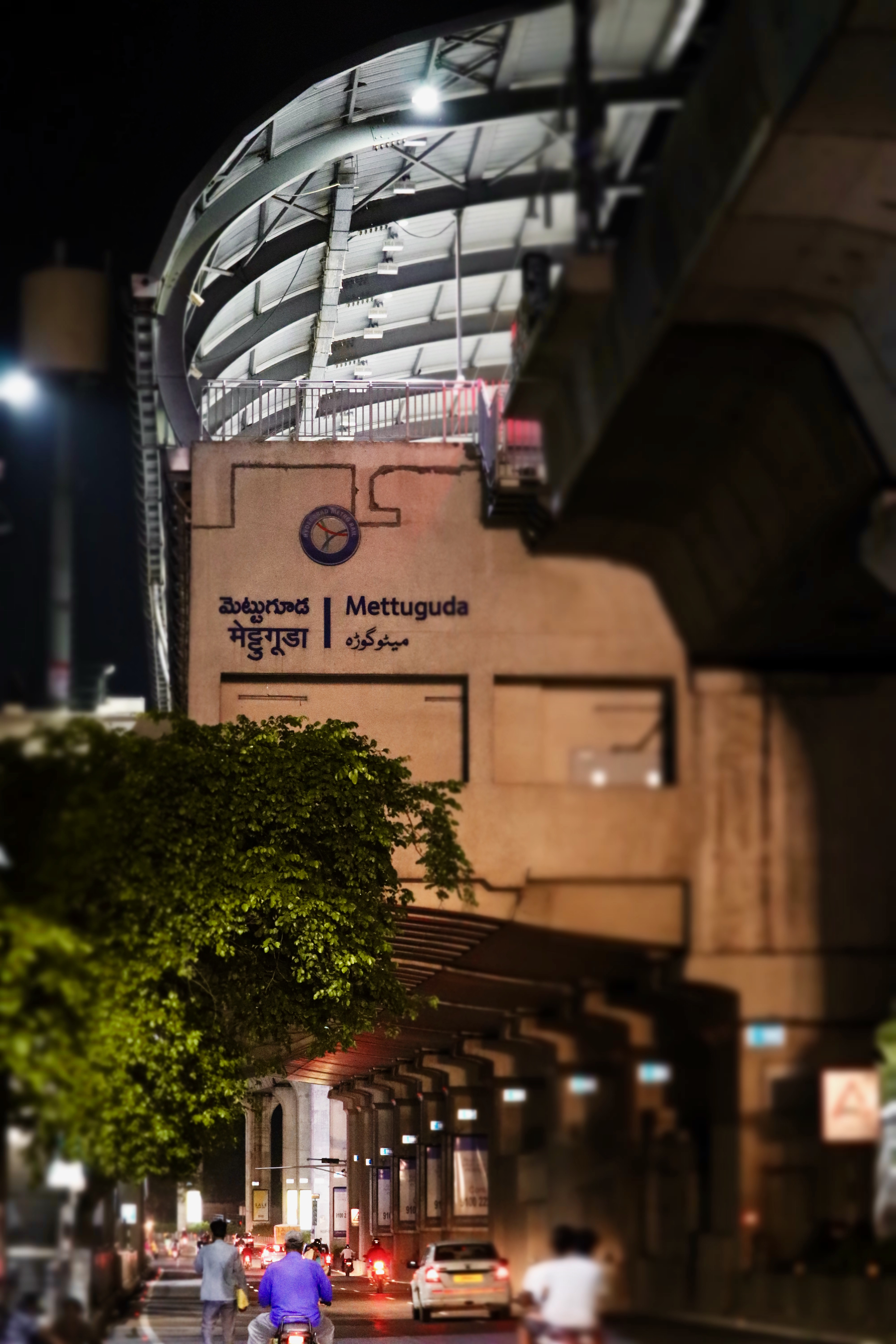

General information
- Location: Near St.Anthony Shrine, Krishna Deva Raya Rd, Lallaguda Railway Colony, Lalaguda, Mettuguda, Secunderabad, Telangana 500017
- Coordinates: 17.4355°N 78.5196°E
- System: Hyderabad Metro station
- Line: Blue Line
- Platforms: 2
- Tracks: 4

Construction
- Structure type: Elevated
- Platform levels: 2
- Parking: Yes
- Cycle facilities: NO

History
- Opened: 28 November 2017

Services
Preceding station	Hyderabad Metro	Following station
Secunderabad East towards Raidurg	Blue Line	Tarnaka towards Nagole
Location

Mettuguda Metro Station is located on the Blue Line of the Hyderabad Metro in India, in the state of Telangana. It is part of Corridor III of the Hyderabad Metro starting from Nagole and towards Hi-Tech city and was opened to the public on 28 November 2017.

== History ==
Nagole-Mettuguda stretch was initially proposed to open in March 2015 but was later put off. The station received the safety certification from the Commissioner for Metro Rail Safety (CMRS) in 2016.

== The station ==
=== Structure ===
Metuguda elevated metro station situated on the Blue Line of Hyderabad Metro.

=== Station layout ===
Street Level
This is the first level where passengers may park their vehicles and view the local area map.

Concourse level
Ticketing office or Ticket Vending Machines (TVMs) is located here. Retail outlets and other facilities like washrooms, ATMs, first aid, etc., will be available in this area.

Platform level
This layer consists of two platforms. Trains takes passengers from this level.

G	Street Level	Exit/Entrance
L1	Mezzanine	Fare control, station agent, Metro Card vending machines, crossover
L2	Side platform No- 1, doors will open on the left
L2	Westbound	Towards →Raidurg→ →
L2	Eastbound	→Towards ← Nagole← ←
L2	Side platform No- 2, doors will open on the left
L2
