= Secunderabad station =

Secunderabad station may refer to:

- Secunderabad East metro station, a metro station on the Hyderabad Metro Blue Line
- Secunderabad Junction railway station, an Indian Railways station in Hyderabad
- Secunderabad West metro station, a metro station on the Hyderabad Metro Green Line
