= Parade Ground metro station =

Metro station in Hyderabad, India

Parade Ground
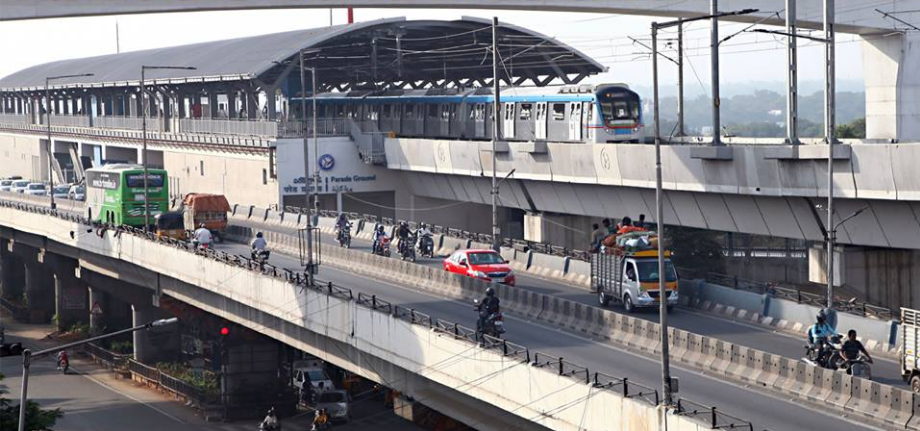

General information
- Coordinates: 17.436793°N 78.443906°E
- System: Hyderabad Metro station
- Line: Blue Line Green Line
- Connections: Jubilee Bus Station

Construction
- Structure type: Elevated

History
- Opened: 28 November 2017; 8 years ago

Services
Preceding station	Hyderabad Metro	Following station
Paradise towards Raidurg	Blue Line	Secunderabad East towards Nagole
Location

The Parade Ground Metro Station is located on the Blue Line of the Hyderabad Metro in India. It is part of Corridor I of the Hyderabad Metro starting from Miyapur and was opened to the public on 28 November 2017. This metro station act as an inter-change between two routes, one from Faluknuma to Jubilee Bus Stand, and the other from Hitec City to Nagole.

== History ==
It was opened on 28 November 2017
