= Stadium metro station =

Metro station in Hyderabad, India

Stadium
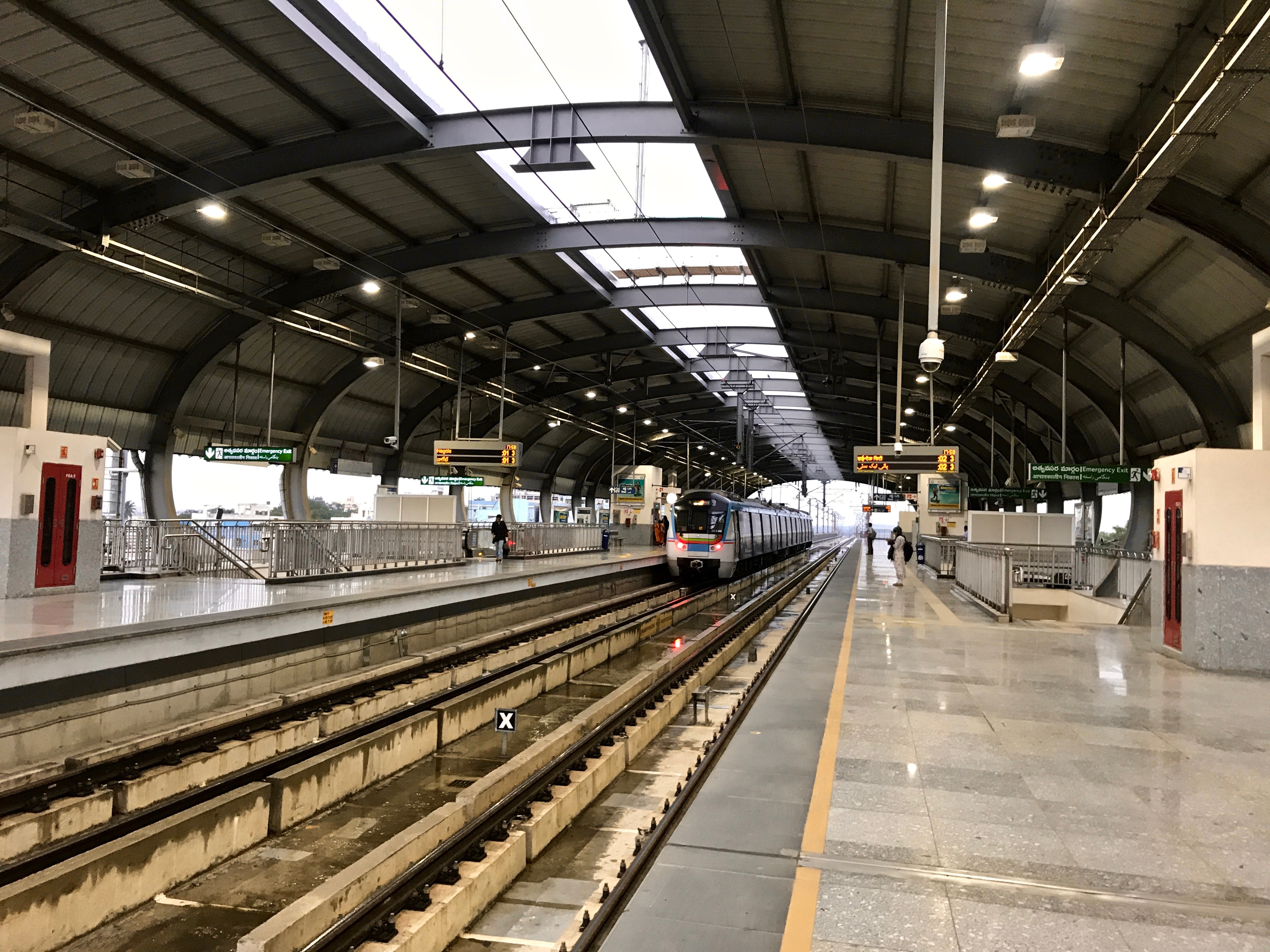

General information
- Location: 18-54/11, Inner Ring Rd, Prasanth Nagar Uppal, Hyderabad, Telangana 500039
- Coordinates: 17.407336°N 78.554261°E
- System: Hyderabad Metro station
- Line: Blue Line
- Tracks: 2

Construction
- Structure type: Elevated
- Platform levels: 2
- Parking: Paid

History
- Opened: 29 November 2017; 8 years ago

Services
Preceding station	Hyderabad Metro	Following station
NGRI towards Raidurg	Blue Line	Uppal towards Nagole
Location

Stadium metro station is located on the Blue Line of the Hyderabad Metro, in India. It is near to Rajiv Gandhi International Cricket Stadium

== History ==
It was opened on 29 November 2017.

== The station ==
=== Structure ===
Stadium elevated metro station situated on the Blue Line of Hyderabad Metro.

== Facilities ==
Stadium Metro Station offers a range of commuter-friendly amenities designed for accessibility and convenience. The station is equipped with elevators and escalators, ensuring smooth movement between different levels, particularly for the elderly and persons with disabilities. It also includes accessible infrastructure, such as ramps and designated entry points for disabled individuals.

Passenger facilities include clean restrooms, ATM services, first aid support, and a selection of retail outlets within the station premises. These features contribute to a comfortable transit experience.

The station has a dedicated parking area for both two-wheelers and four-wheelers, available from 6:00 AM to 10:30 PM.

Due to its proximity to the Rajiv Gandhi International Cricket Stadium, the station sees increased footfall during major sporting events. Special arrangements are often made to manage crowd flow between the station and the stadium, although there is no permanent skywalk in place.

For safety, the station is monitored via CCTV surveillance, and features both ticket vending machines (TVMs) and a manual ticketing office.

== Station layout ==
Street Level
This is the first level where passengers may park their vehicles and view the local area map.

Concourse level
Ticketing office or Ticket Vending Machines (TVMs) is located here. Retail outlets and other facilities like washrooms, ATMs, first aid, etc., will be available in this area.

Platform level
This layer consists of two platforms. Trains takes passengers from this level.

G	Street level	Exit/Entrance
L1	Mezzanine	Fare control, station agent, Metro Card vending machines, crossover
L2	Side platform No- 1, doors will open on the left
L2	Southbound	Towards →Raidurg→ →
L2	Northbound	→Towards ← Nagole← ←
L2	Side platform No- 2, doors will open on the left
L2

== Entry/exit ==
Uppal station Entry/exits
Gate No-A	Gate No-B	Gate No-C	Gate No-D

== See also ==
- Hyderabad
- Transport in Hyderabad
- List of rapid transit systems
- List of metro systems
