= Hyderabad Airport Metro Express =

Approved Metro Line in India

Hyderabad Airport Express Metro

Overview
- Other name: Corridor IV
- Status: Stopped
- Owner: Hyderabad Metro
- Locale: Hyderabad, India
- Termini: Raidurg; RGIA Terminal
- Stations: 10
- Website: HAML

Service
- Type: Airport Express Train
- System: Rapid Transit
- Operator: Hyderabad Airport Metro Limited (HAML)

History
- Planned opening: on hold

Technical
- Line length: 31 km (19 mi)
- Character: Underground, and Elevated
- Track gauge: 1,435 mm (4 ft 8 1/2 in) standard gauge
- Electrification: 25 kV 50 Hz AC overhead catenary

The Hyderabad Airport Express Metro or Corridor IV was a planned Hyderabad Metro line from Raidurg metro station to Rajiv Gandhi International Airport. The total length of the line is 31 km (19 mi). Hyderabad Airport Express Metro is fully funded by Government of Telangana through the engineering, procurement and construction (EPC) mode. As of December 2023, Union Government is yet to provide in principle approval for this project. On 13 December 2023, the Hyderabad Airport Metro Express was put on hold pending a realignment as directed by the Chief Minister of Telangana.

== History ==
On 26 March 2018, a special purpose vehicle company, Hyderabad Airport Metro Limited (HAML), was established by the Government of Telangana to develop the Hyderabad Airport Metro Express. HMRL Managing Director N.V.S. Reddy (Venkatsatyanarayan Reddy Nallamilli) is also Managing Director of HAML, which is jointly promoted by HMRL, Hyderabad Metropolitan Development Authority (HMDA) and Telangana State Industrial Infrastructure Corporation (TSIIC). In August 2019, TRS Working President, Minister for Municipal Administration & Urban Development, Industries and IT&C K. T. Rama Rao said that the work on Hyderabad Metro Airport Express from Raheja Mindspace to Shamshabad RGI Airport will start soon. The alignment to Shamshabad RGI Airport from the Raidurg metro station will be through the new Khajaguda Link Road (Beside CARE Hospitals). In March 2021, the Government of Telangana allocated ₹ 1,000 crore for Hyderabad Metro Rail Ltd in the 2021-2022 state budget. In September 2021, GMR Group, the company operating the Rajiv Gandhi International Airport (RGIA) in Hyderabad said that it will invest ₹ 519.52 crore towards metro connectivity at the airport.

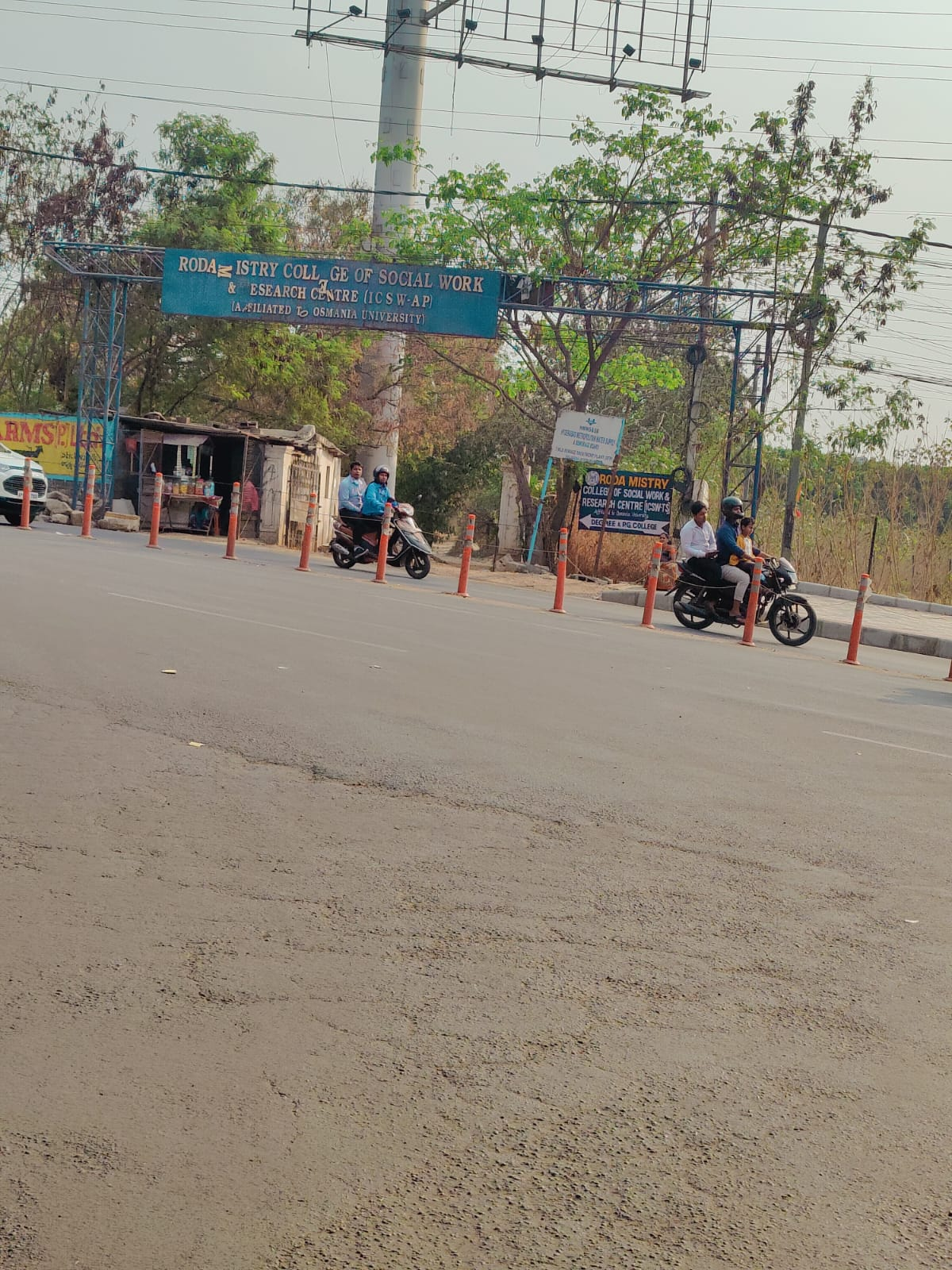
Roda mistry college gachibowli

In March 2022, Government of Telangana allocated ₹2,377.35 crore (US$250 million) to the Hyderabad Metro Rail (HMR) in the 2022-2023 state budget. The Government of Telangana announced funds worth ₹ 1,500 crore for the Hyderabad Metro Rail for land acquisition, preparation of detailed project reports and other developmental work, ₹ 377.35 crore for Airport Metro connectivity and ₹ 500 crore for Metro connectivity to the old city (for initiating Corridor II- Green Line works from MGBS to Falaknuma; 5.5 km (3.4 mi)). The 31 km (19 mi) Airport Express Metro Corridor is proposed to have 29.3 km (18.2 mi) elevated and a 1.7 km (1.1 mi) underground section to connect to the airport terminal. The airport route will have 9 elevated stations and one underground station. The metro viaduct will cross the junction near IKEA store at about 21 metres (69 ft) high. From Raidurg Metro terminal station, it will pass over Bio-diversity Junction, through Roda Mistry college lane, Khajaguda Junction, touching Outer Ring Road at Nanakramguda junction and traverse along ORR to Shamshabad Airport through the existing dedicated Metro Rail Right-of-Way.

In February 2023, Government of Telangana allocated ₹500 crore (US$52 million) to the Hyderabad Airport Metro Express in the 2023-2024 state budget. On 18 February 2023, HMRL Managing Director N.V.S. Reddy informed that Nanakramguda junction metro station will be designed as portal structure with three pillars and the station is required to be close to the junction. Nanakramguda junction metro station will be about 2.5 km (1.6 mi) from Wipro circle. In June 2023, Managing director of HAML, NVS Reddy informed that order for 11 metro trains with three coaches each will be placed by the end of 2023.

=== Foundation laying ceremony ===
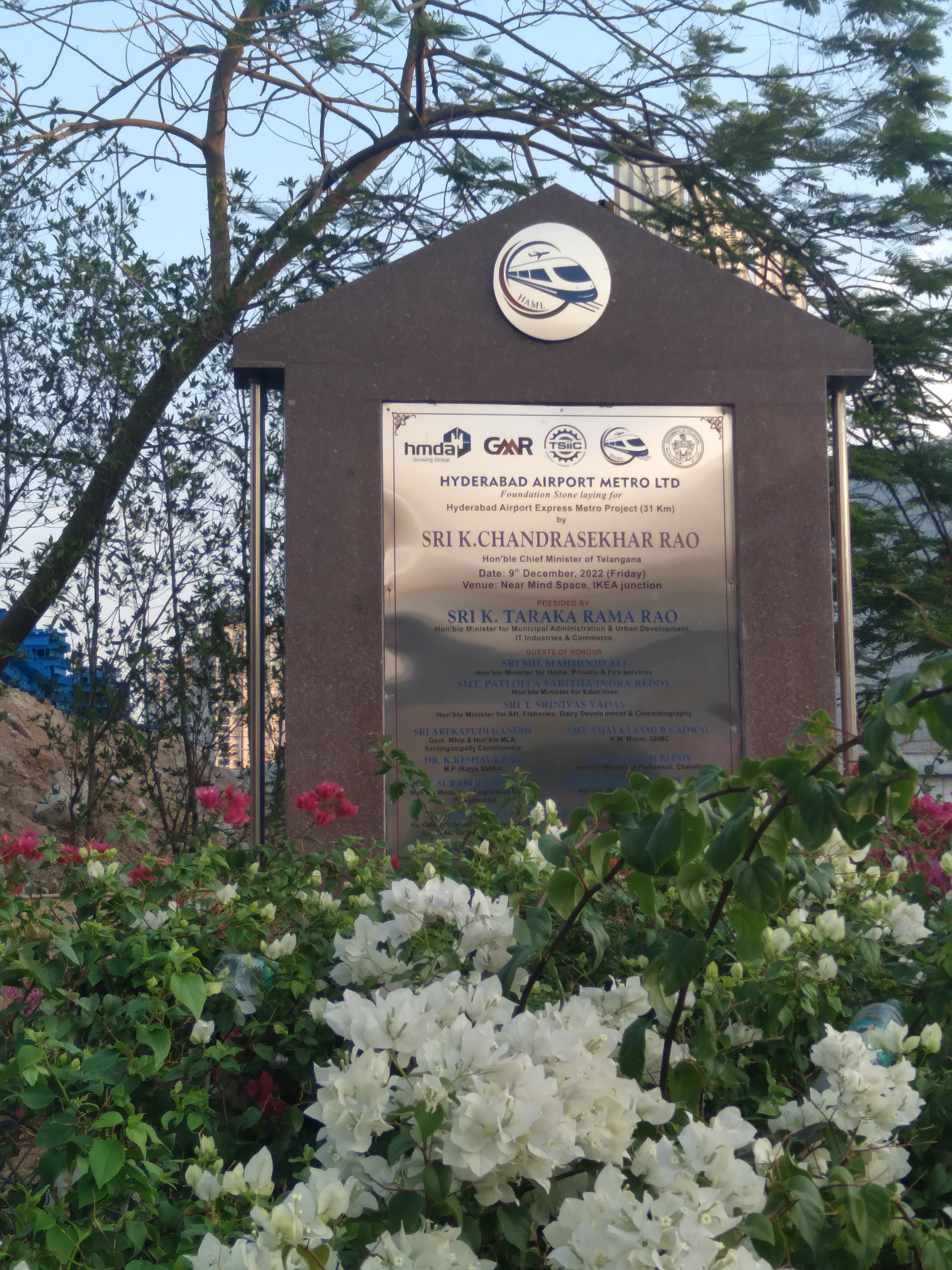
Hyderabad Airport Express Metro foundation Stone

Chief Minister of Telangana K. Chandrashekar Rao laid the foundation stone for Hyderabad Airport Express Metro at Mindspace Junction on 9 December 2022. It will be built at an approximate cost of ₹6,250 crore (US$650 million). Hyderabad Airport Express Metro is a Telangana State Government funded project and will be completed by beginning of 2026. The existing corridor three (Blue line) from Raidurg Station to the new Airport Metro Raidurg Station will be extended by about 900 meters (2,953 ft), thus it would be an integrated four-level station, somewhat similar to JBS Station of metro corridor-2 (Green line) and Ameerpet interchange station. The extended blue line terminal station and the Airport Metro station is planned as a combined interchange station one over the other. The combined interchange station design is due to space constraints in front of L&T and Aurobindo buildings after IKEA junction. The first two levels will accommodate Airport Metro station and the top two levels will accommodate the extended blue line (Corridor 3) terminal station.

=== Pre-construction survey work for alignment finalization ===
In December 2022, Hyderabad Airport Metro Ltd (HAML) engaged two survey teams to gather ground data for alignment finalization and determining the station locations. In January 2023, K. T. Rama Rao sought Central Government’s in-principle approval for Hyderabad airport express metro project. To expedite grounding of Hyderabad airport metro works, this pre-construction activity was taken up simultaneously. The survey work is done by using both the satellite based Differential GPS and the Electronic Total station. Till 14 January 2023, the survey of 21 km (13 mi) from Raidurg metro station to Fort Grand underpass near Shamshabad was completed and remaining 10 km (6.2 mi) will be completed by January 2023 end. Thereafter, peg marking of the airport metro alignment will start. On 31 January 2023, HMRL Managing Director N.V.S. Reddy informed that Metro pillars will be located in the central median of the widened service road from Nanakramguda junction to TSPA (APPA) junction. On 28 February 2023, HMRL Managing Director N.V.S. Reddy informed that survey for the airport Metro corridor is completed and peg marking of its alignment on the ground has begun. Aluminium boards with a retro-reflective sheet for visibility at night are also being embedded in the central median. On 27 March 2023, HMRL Managing Director N.V.S. Reddy informed that alignment has been fixed and peg marking for the Airport Metro project is completed. Soil testing has commenced, through in-situ tests and laboratory tests of borehole soil samples up to a depth of about 40 feet (12 m) from road surface, before finalising the exact locations for the pillars. Soil testing would be done by engineering wing in 100 locations for erecting pillars, over a period of two months.

On 26 April 2023, HAML Managing Director, NVS Reddy inspected the Shamshabad airport metro stretch of Airport Metro alignment of about 1.3 km (0.81 mi) on Rajendranagar hillock. On 30 April 2023, Hyderabad Airport Metro Limited (HAML) Managing Director N.V.S. Reddy and others inspected Delhi Airport Metro Express by travelling on it, examining the check-in facility on the city side at New Delhi station. On 15 May 2023, HAML Managing Director N.V.S. Reddy informed that provision has also been kept for construction of four additional stations in future.

=== Selection of General Consultant ===
On 3 December 2022, Hyderabad Airport Metro Limited (HAML) invited Expression of Interest (EoI cum RfQ) for selection of General Consultant (GC) for the Design and Build (DB) of Airport Express. Technical experts and field engineers with sound domain knowledge and experience will be in the GC, to work in tandem with the techno-managerial team of HAML. The last date for Submission of EOI is December 13, 2022, and the last date for bid submission is January 20, 2023. Pre Application Conference for this was held in Hyderabad on 6 December 2022, Marigold Hotel, Green Lands, Begumpet. About 23 reputed national and international engineering consultancy firms participated in the meeting. By 21 December 2022, 5 consortiums applied for the Request for qualifications (RfQ) for the General Consultants (GC) for the Hyderabad Airport Metro project.

#	Pre-qualified Bidders for RfQ for the General Consultants (GC)
1	SYSTRA(France) + RITES + DB Engineering & Consulting(Germany)
2	Ayesa Ingenieria y Arquitectura (Spain) + Nippon Koei(Japan) + Aarvee Associates
3	Technica y Proyectos (Spain) + PINI Group(Switzerland)
4	AECOM India + Egis Rail (France) + Egis India
5	Consulting Engineers Group + Korea National Railway(South Korea)

On 28 December 2022, after evaluation of their applications, Hyderabad Airport Metro Limited (HAML) declared that all the five consortia had qualified to participate in the next stage bid documents i.e., the Request for proposal (RfP) and they will have to submit their bids by January 20, 2023. On 20 April 2023, SYSTRA(France) + RITES + DB Engineering & Consulting(Germany) was selected as the General Consultants (GC) for the Airport Metro project, based on the recommendations of a technical committee. SYSTRA-led consortium got the highest technical score for its credentials and gave the lowest financial quote of ₹98.54 crore (US$10 million) to provide engineering consultancy services. The immediate task of the General Consultant was to prepare engineering, procurement and construction (EPC) tender documents for selecting the contractor for the Airport Metro Project. The SYSTRA-led consortium would deploy 18 experts of different railway engineering disciplines and about 70 senior and field engineering personnel during the construction of Airport Metro Project.

=== Selection of Consultant for marking right of way (RoW) ===
In December 2022, Hyderabad Airport Metro Limited (HAML) invited bids for clearing vegetation and marking right-of-way (RoW) from Mindspace Junction to RGIA Airport. Consultants would be asked to finish the project within three months. The successful bidder would not be allowed to chop trees.

#	Starting Section for marking RoW	Terminal section	Sanctioned Amount (in ₹)
1	MindSpace junction	My Home Avatar, Narsingi	95 lakh
2	Rajapushpa Provincia Apartment, Narsingi,	TSPA	80 lakh
3	Rajiv Gruhakalpa	Bengaluru highway	75 lakh
4	Chevella road	Musi river, Rajendranagar	90 lakh
5	ORR exit, Rajendranagar	Shivam Road	86 lakh
6	Shamshabad junction	RGIA, Hyderabad	98 lakh

=== Invitation to tender for construction contracts ===
On 15 May 2023, Hyderabad Airport Metro Limited invited open tender for design and construction work of Airport Metro Line. The estimated contract value is ₹5,688 crore (US$590 million) and contract period is 3 years. The last date for submission of bids is 5 July 2023. The selected EPC Contractor must start the ground works of Hyderabad Airport Metro Express by September 2023. On 14 June 2023, a pre-bid meeting with prospective construction firms was held at the Hyderabad Metro Rail (HMR) office, where 13 companies like L&T, Alstom, Siemens, Tata Projects IRCON, RVNL, BEML, Pandrol Rahee Technologies, etc. participated, who were informed that soil testing was underway. The original submission date was extended by 1 week and the bids are slated to opened on 12 July 2023. After the bids were opened on 13 July 2023, L&T & NCC Ltd (formerly Nagarjuna Construction Company) emerged as the two competing bidders for the Hyderabad Airport Metro project. The two construction firms have submitted security deposit of 29 crore rupees each in bank guarantees. L&T emerged as the lowest bidder, after the bids were opened on 14 August 2023.

On 13 December 2023, the project was put on hold pending a realignment as directed by the Chief Minister of Telangana. The reason cited was that scope for development was limited due to GO-111 restrictions.

== Finances ==
Hyderabad Metropolitan Development Authority (HMDA) and GMR Group contributed ₹625 crore (US$65 million) each, or 10 per cent of the project's cost.

== Stations ==
Hyderabad Airport Express Metro
#	Station Name		Opened	Connections	Alignment
#	English	Telugu	Opened	Connections	Alignment
1	Raidurg	రాయదుర్గ్	Yet to start construction	Airport Shuttle; Blue Line	Elevated
2	Biodiversity Junction	జీవవైవిధ్య జంక్షన్	Yet to start construction	None	Elevated
3	Nanakramguda Junction	నానక్రంగూడ జంక్షన్	Yet to start construction	None	Elevated
4	Puppalaguda	పుప్పల్‌గూడా	Yet to start construction	None	Elevated
5	Narsingi	నార్సింగి	Yet to start construction	None	Elevated
6	TS Police Academy/Manchirevula	టి ఎస్ పోలీస్ అకాడమీ/మంచిరేవుల	Yet to start construction	None	Elevated
7	Rajendranagar/Satamrai	రాజేంద్రనగర్ / సతామ్రాయి	Yet to start construction	None	Elevated
8	Shamshabad	శంషాబాద్	Yet to start construction	None	Elevated
9	Airport Cargo	ఎయిర్పోర్ట్ కార్గో	Yet to start construction	None	Elevated
10	RGIA Terminal	ఆర్ జి ఐ ఎ టెర్మినల్	Yet to start construction	None	Underground

== Depot ==
On 10 August 2023, GMR Airport was asked to hand over 48 acres of land for taking up construction of depot.

== Benefits beyond airport connectivity ==
Air passengers will be able to check-in and part with their baggage at Raidurg metro station itself and reach the Boarding gates directly at Rajiv Gandhi International Airport. Multi-location check-in facility at the metro station will be crucial public transport link for southern Hyderabad and suburban areas. The Hyderabad airport Express metro will provide a crucial link for the GMR Aerocity Hyderabad at Adibatla and proposed Hyderabad Pharma City. The travelling time from Mindspace junction to Hyderabad airport will be 26 minutes. There will be a provision of half-height platform screen doors (PSD) for improved passenger safety. There will be bolster-less bogies and Automated fare collection (AFC) gates at each station. In order to keep passengers informed about the flights, there will be a Flight information display system (FIDS) and information desk at all Hyderabad airport metro stations. The Hyderabad Airport Express Metro's airport station will be underneath the passenger terminal and will transport passengers to the gates through lifts, escalators and stairs.

The Airport Metro connects several residential areas along its route like Rajendranagar, Budwel, Narsingi, Kismatpur, TS Police Academy, Shamshabad etc. This area houses around 5 Lakh people. Airport Metro project is planned as an opportunity to facilitate development of city outskirts for providing affordable housing for lower income groups and better accommodation for middle class at lower costs. The project is designed not only for Airport passengers but also for reverse commute of those who stay in extended parts of the city to reach their work places in city within about 20 minutes. Vacant Government land parcels would be identified near stations to provide good parking facilities. Multi-armed Skywalks with landings on all sides of junctions will be provided for easy access and to make Airport Metro a preferred commute option. Airport Metro is being dovetailed to facilitate and cater to this unprecedented growth of Hyderabad.

== Second airport connectivity from Falaknuma ==
There is a proposal to give a second connectivity to Rajiv Gandhi International Airport, Shamshabad from Falaknuma in Old City. In January 2024, revised airport metro line will have Chandrayangutta as inter-change metro station. The remaining 5.5-km MGBS-Falaknuma route will be extended by another 1.5 km to Chandrayangutta. The newly planned Airport line is Nagole - LB Nagar - Chandrayangutta - Mailardevpally - Satamrai - Shamshabad Airport.

== See also ==
- Transport in Hyderabad
- Hyderabad Multi-Modal Transport System
- Airport Express (MTR)
- Namma Metro ORR-Airport Metro Line
- Delhi Airport Metro Express
- Mumbai Airport Express Line
