= Uppal metro station =

Metro station in Hyderabad, India

Uppal

General information
- Location: Inner Ring Rd, Survey Colony, Industrial Development Area, Uppal, Hyderabad, Telangana 500039
- Coordinates: 17.3987948°N 78.5538439°E
- System: Hyderabad Metro station
- Line: Blue Line
- Tracks: 2

Construction
- Structure type: Elevated
- Platform levels: 2

History
- Opened: 29 November 2017; 8 years ago

Services
Preceding station	Hyderabad Metro	Following station
Stadium towards Raidurg	Blue Line	Nagole Terminus
Location
- Location within Hyderabad Location within Telangana Location within India

Uppal metro station is located on the Blue Line of the Hyderabad Metro India. It is near to Kendriya Vidyalaya, Uppal X Roads, Uppal Police station, Karachi Bakery, Rajlakshmi Theatre, Uppal Bus stop.

== History ==
It was opened on 29 November 2017.

== The station ==
=== Structure ===
Uppal elevated metro station situated on the Blue Line of Hyderabad Metro.

=== Station layout ===
Street Level
This is the first level where passengers may park their vehicles and view the local area map.

Concourse level
Ticketing office or Ticket Vending Machines (TVMs) is located here. Retail outlets and other facilities like washrooms, ATMs, first aid, etc., will be available in this area.

Platform level
This layer consists of two platforms. Trains takes passengers from this level.

G	Street level	Exit/Entrance
L1	Mezzanine	Fare control, station agent, Metro Card vending machines, crossover
L2	Side platform No- 1, doors will open on the left
L2	Southbound	Towards →Raidurg→ →
L2	Northbound	→Towards ← Nagole← ←
L2	Side platform No- 2, doors will open on the left
L2

== Entry/exit ==
Uppal station Entry/exits
Gate No-A	Gate No-B	Gate No-C	Gate No-D

== See also ==
- Hyderabad
- Transport in Hyderabad
- List of rapid transit systems
- List of metro systems
