= Mettuguda =

Coordinates: 18°43′N 83°49′E

- Neighbourhood
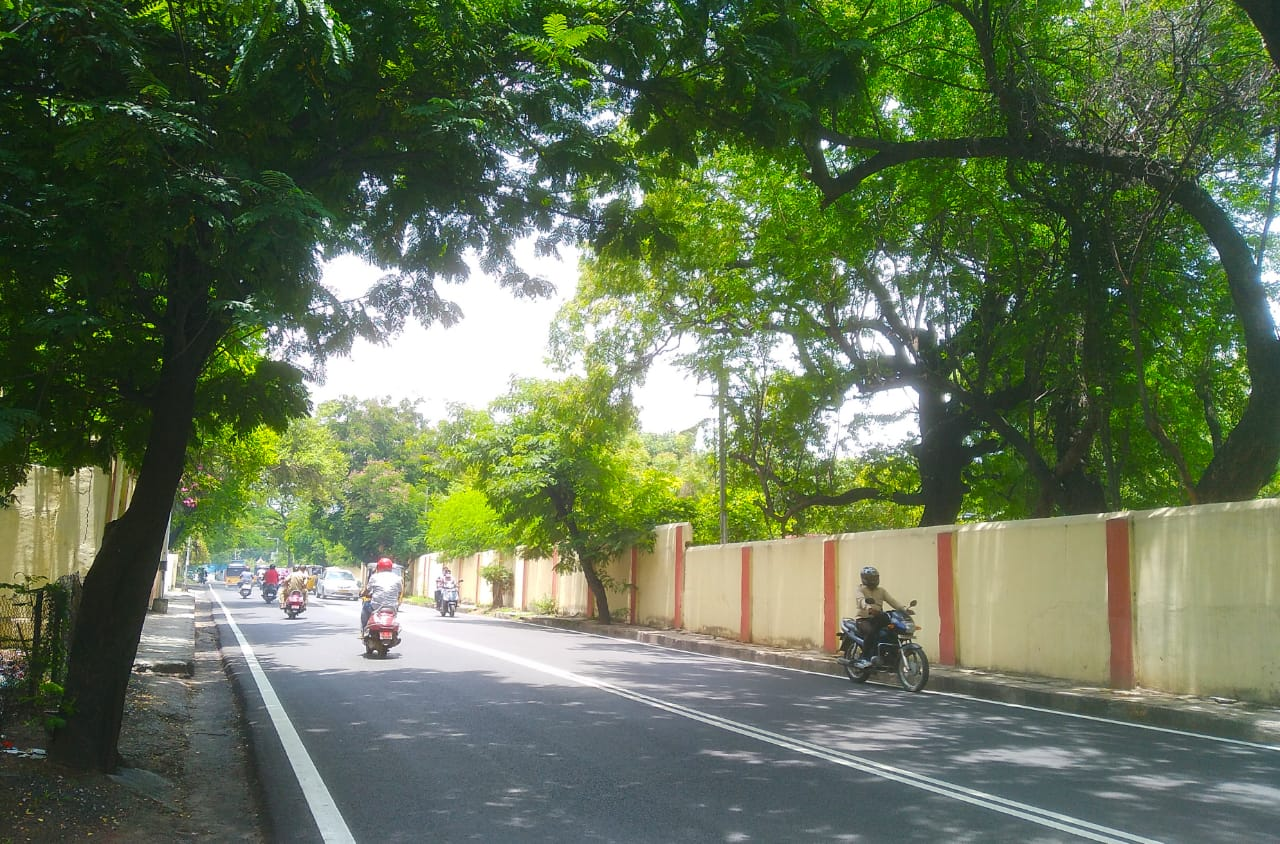
- Main street in Mettuguda

- Location in Telangana, India Mettuguda (India)
- Country: India
- State: Telangana
- District: Hyderabad
- City: Secunderabad

Government
  - Body: GHMC

Languages
  - Official: Telugu
- Time zone: UTC+5:30 (IST)
- PIN: 500017
- Vehicle registration: TS
- Lok Sabha constituency: Secunderabad
- Vidhan Sabha constituency: Secunderabad
- Planning agency: GHMC
- Website: telangana.gov.in

Mettuguda is a neighbourhood in Secunderabad city in the Indian state of Telangana.

Mettuguda is divided into three regions: Mettuguda, Alugadda Bbavi and New Mettuguda. These are divided by Mettuguda Y Junction. Hindu temples there include Temple Ayyappa and Uma Mesheshwara Temple. St. Anthony's shrine and CSI St. Mark's Church are also located there.

Railway hospital in Mettuguda is very famous. There is also a graveyard from British times. Railway Hospital, Rail kalyan, Railway officers Club, Railway Recruitment Board, Railway Quarters and Officers Bungalow are also located in Mettuguda.

In February 2021, Greater Hyderabad Municipal Corporation has provided 15 stalls for roadside vendors.

== Transport ==
The inner ring road and Warangal Highway pass through Mettuguda. Nearby neighbourhoods are Malkajgiri, Tarnaka, Secunderabad and Sitaphalmandi.

Mettuguda metro station is close by making commutation very convenient.
