= List of Hyderabad Metro stations =

List of metro stations in Hyderabad India

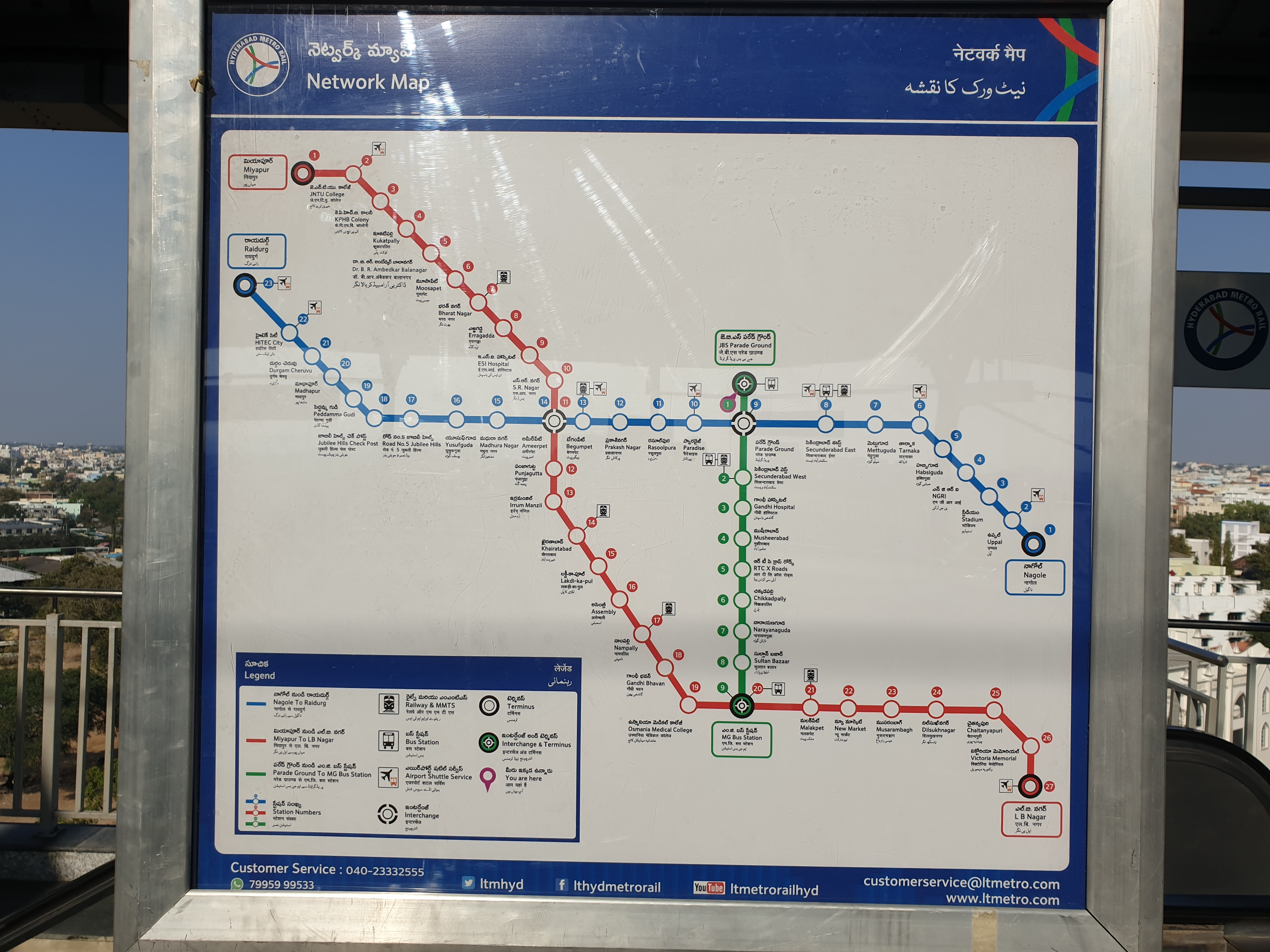
Hyderabad Metro network map

This is the list of stations of the Hyderabad Metro, a rapid transit system serving the city of Hyderabad in Telangana, India. As of February 2020, there are 57 metro stations in the network, which were completed and operational as a part of Phase I, making it the third longest operational metro network in India after Delhi Metro and Namma Metro of Bengaluru.

Prime Minister Narendra Modi inaugurated the Hyderabad Metro on 29 November 2017 by opening a 30 km stretch from Miyapur to Nagole, making it the longest stretch commissioned in the first phase among all metros in India. It has since been expanded to around 69 km (43 mi) of route length. The system is operated by the Hyderabad Metro Rail Limited (HMRL). Stations display signboards in Telugu, English, Hindi and Urdu. All stations of Hyderabad Metro Rail are equipped with a tactile pathway from street level to the platform level, along with elevator buttons equipped with Braille, for providing barrier-less navigation for visually impaired commuters.

Each line of the Hyderabad Metro is identified by a specific colour. The system uses rolling stock of standard gauge and has elevated lines. The Metro is open from about 06:30 to 22:30 hours, with trains operating at a frequency of 3.5 to 6.5 minutes with SelTrac communications-based train control (CBTC) and integrated telecommunication and supervision systems that allow an unattended train operation. As of February 2020, Hyderabad Metro had an average daily ridership of around 475,000. The Red Line connects Miyapur to the north and LB Nagar to the south, while the Blue Line connects HITEC City to the west and Nagole to the east.

== Stations ==
†	Terminal station
*	Transfer station
†*	Terminal and transfer station to other lines
††	Transfer station to Indian Railways / ISBT / Airport Shuttle
**	Transfer station to other lines and Indian Railways / ISBT / Airport Shuttle
#*	Terminal and transfer station to Indian Railways / ISBT / Airport Shuttle
†¤	Terminal, transfer station to other lines and Indian Railways / ISBT / Airport Shuttle

Station name			Line	Opened	Layout	Notes	Ref.
English	Telugu	Urdu	Line	Opened	Layout	Notes	Ref.
Ameerpet *	అమీర్‌పేట	امیرپیٹ	Blue Line; Red Line	29 November 2017	Elevated	Interchange of trains between Blue Line and Red Line	
Assembly	అసెంబ్లీ	اسمبلی	Red Line	24 September 2018	Elevated		
Begumpet ††	బేగంపేట	بیگم پیٹ	Blue Line	29 November 2017	Elevated	Transfer station for Begumpet railway station; Transfer station for Airport Shuttle	
Bharat Nagar ††	భరత్ నగర్	بھارت نگر	Red Line	29 November 2017	Elevated	Transfer station for Bharat Nagar railway station	
Chaitanyapuri	చైతన్యపురి	چیتنیا پوری	Red Line	24 September 2018	Elevated		
Chikkadpally	చిక్కడపల్లి	چکڈ پلی	Green Line	7 February 2020	Elevated		
Dilsukhnagar	దిల్ సుఖ్ నగర్	دلسکھ نگر	Red Line	24 September 2018	Elevated		
Dr. B. R. Ambedkar Balanagar	డా.బి.ఆర్.అంబేద్కర్ బాలానగర్	ڈاکٹر بی آر امبیڈکر بالا نگر	Red Line	29 November 2017	Elevated		
Durgam Cheruvu	దుర్గం చెరువు	درگم چیروو	Blue Line	20 March 2019	Elevated		
Erragadda	ఎర్రగడ్డ	ایراگڈا	Red Line	29 November 2017	Elevated		
ESI Hospital	ఇ.ఎస్.ఐ హాస్పిటల్	ای ایس آئی ہسپتال	Red Line	29 November 2017	Elevated		
Gandhi Bhavan	గాంధీ భవన్	گاندھی بھون	Red Line	24 September 2018	Elevated		
Gandhi Hospital	గాంధీ హాస్పిటల్	گاندھی ہسپتال	Green Line	7 February 2020	Elevated		
Habsiguda	హబ్సిగూడ	حبسی گوڈا	Blue Line	29 November 2017	Elevated		
HITEC City ††	హైటెక్ సిటీ	ہائیٹیک سٹی	Blue Line	20 March 2019	Elevated	Transfer station for Airport Shuttle	
Irrum Manzil	ఇరమ్ మంజిల్	ارم منزل	Red Line	24 September 2018	Elevated		
JBS Parade Ground †¤	జె బి ఎస్ పరేడ్ గ్రౌండ్	جے بی ایس پریڈ گراؤنڈ	Green Line; Blue Line	7 February 2020; 20 March 2019	Elevated	Terminal station for Green Line; Transfer station for Jubilee Bus Station; Interchange of trains between Blue Line and Green Line	
JNTU College ††	జె ఎన్ టి యు కాలేజీ	جے این ٹی یو کالج	Red Line	29 November 2017	Elevated	Transfer station for Airport Shuttle	
Jubilee Hills Check Post	జూబ్లీహిల్స్ చెక్ పోస్ట్	جوبلی ہلز چیک پوسٹ	Blue Line	18 May 2019	Elevated		
Khairatabad ††	ఖైరతాబాద్	خیریت آباد	Red Line	24 September 2018	Elevated	Transfer station for Khairatabad railway station	
KPHB Colony	కె పి హెచ్ బి కాలనీ	کے پی ایچ بی کالونی	Red Line	29 November 2017	Elevated		
Kukatpally	కూకట్‌పల్లి	کوکٹ پلی	Red Line	29 November 2017	Elevated		
LB Nagar #*	ఎల్ బి నగర్	ایل بی نگر	Red Line	24 September 2018	Elevated	Terminal station for Red Line; Transfer station for Airport Shuttle	
Lakdi-ka-pul	లక్డీ-కా-పుల్	لکڈی کا پل	Red Line	24 September 2018	Elevated	Transfer station for Lakdi-ka-pul railway station	
Madhapur	మాదాపూర్	مادھا پور	Blue Line	13 April 2019	Elevated		
Malakpet ††	మలక్ పేట	ملاکپیٹ	Red Line	24 September 2018	Elevated	Transfer station for Malakpet railway station	
Mettuguda	మెట్టుగూడ	میٹگوڈا	Blue Line	29 November 2017	Elevated		
MG Bus Station †¤	ఎం జి బస్ స్టేషన్	ایم جی بس اسٹیشن	Red Line; Green Line	24 September 2018; 7 February 2020	Elevated	Terminal station for Green Line; Transfer station for Mahatma Gandhi Bus Station; Interchange of trains between Red Line and Green Line	
Miyapur †	మియాపూర్	میا پور	Red Line	29 November 2017	Elevated	Terminal station for Red Line	
Moosapet	మూసాపేట్	مساپیٹ	Red Line	29 November 2017	Elevated		
Musarambagh	ముసారాంబాగ్	مسارم باغ	Red Line	24 September 2018	Elevated		
Musheerabad	ముషీరాబాద్	مشیرآباد	Green Line	7 February 2020	Elevated		
Nagole †	నాగోల్	ناگولے	Blue Line	29 November 2017	Elevated	Terminal station for Blue Line	
Nampally ††	నాంపల్లి	نامپلی ۔	Red Line	24 September 2018	Elevated	Transfer station for Hyderabad Deccan railway station	
Narayanaguda	నారాయణగూడ	نارائن گوڈا	Green Line	7 February 2020	Elevated		
New Market	కొత్త మార్కెట్	نیو مارکیٹ	Red Line	24 September 2018	Elevated		
NGRI	ఎన్ జి ఆర్ ఐ	این جی آر آئی	Blue Line	29 November 2017	Elevated		
Osmania Medical College	ఉస్మానియా మెడికల్ కాలేజీ	عثمانیہ میڈیکل کالج	Red Line	24 September 2018	Elevated		
Parade Ground *	పరేడ్ గ్రౌండ్	پریڈ گراؤنڈ	Blue Line	29 November 2017	Elevated	Interchange of trains between Blue Line and Green Line	
Paradise ††	ప్యారడైజ్	پیراڈس	Blue Line	29 November 2017	Elevated	Transfer station for Airport Shuttle	
Peddamma Gudi	పెద్దమ్మ గుడి	پدما گوڈی	Blue Line	30 March 2019	Elevated		
Prakash Nagar	ప్రకాష్ నగర్	پرکاش نگر	Blue Line	29 November 2017	Elevated		
Punjagutta	పంజాగుట్ట	پنجگٹہ	Red Line	24 September 2018	Elevated		
Raidurg #*	రాయదుర్గ్	رائدرگ	Blue Line	29 November 2019	Elevated	Terminal station for Blue Line; Transfer station for Airport Shuttle	
Rasoolpura	రసూల్‌పురా	رسول پورہ	Blue Line	29 November 2017	Elevated		
Road No 5 Jubilee Hills	రోడ్ నెం.5 జూబ్లీ హిల్స్	روڈ نمبر ۵ جوبلی ہلز	Blue Line	20 March 2019	Elevated		
R.T.C. X Roads	ఆర్ టి సి క్రాస్ రోడ్స్	آر ٹی سی ایکس روڈز	Green Line	7 February 2020	Elevated		
S.R. Nagar	ఎస్ ఆర్ నగర్	ایس آر نگر	Red Line	29 November 2017	Elevated		
Secunderabad East ††	సికింద్రాబాద్ తూర్పు	سکندرآباد ایسٹ	Blue Line	29 November 2017	Elevated	Transfer station for Rathifile Bus Station; Transfer station for Secunderabad railway station	
Secunderabad West ††	సికింద్రాబాద్ వెస్ట్	سکندرآباد ویسٹ	Green Line	7 February 2020	Elevated	Transfer station for Secunderabad railway station	
Stadium	స్టేడియం	اپل اسٹیڈیم	Blue Line	29 November 2017	Elevated		
Sultan Bazaar	సుల్తాన్ బజార్	سلطان بازار	Green Line	7 February 2020	Elevated		
Tarnaka ††	తార్నాక	ترناکا	Blue Line	29 November 2017	Elevated	Transfer station for Airport Shuttle	
Madhura Nagar	మధుర నగర్	مدھورا نگر	Blue Line	20 March 2019	Elevated		
Uppal ††	ఉప్పల్	اپل	Blue Line	29 November 2017	Elevated	Transfer station for Airport Shuttle	
Victoria Memorial	విక్టోరియా మెమోరియల్	وکٹوریہ میموریل	Red Line	24 September 2018	Elevated		
Yusufguda	యూసుఫ్‌గూడ	یوسف گوڈا	Blue Line	20 March 2019	Elevated		

== Lines ==
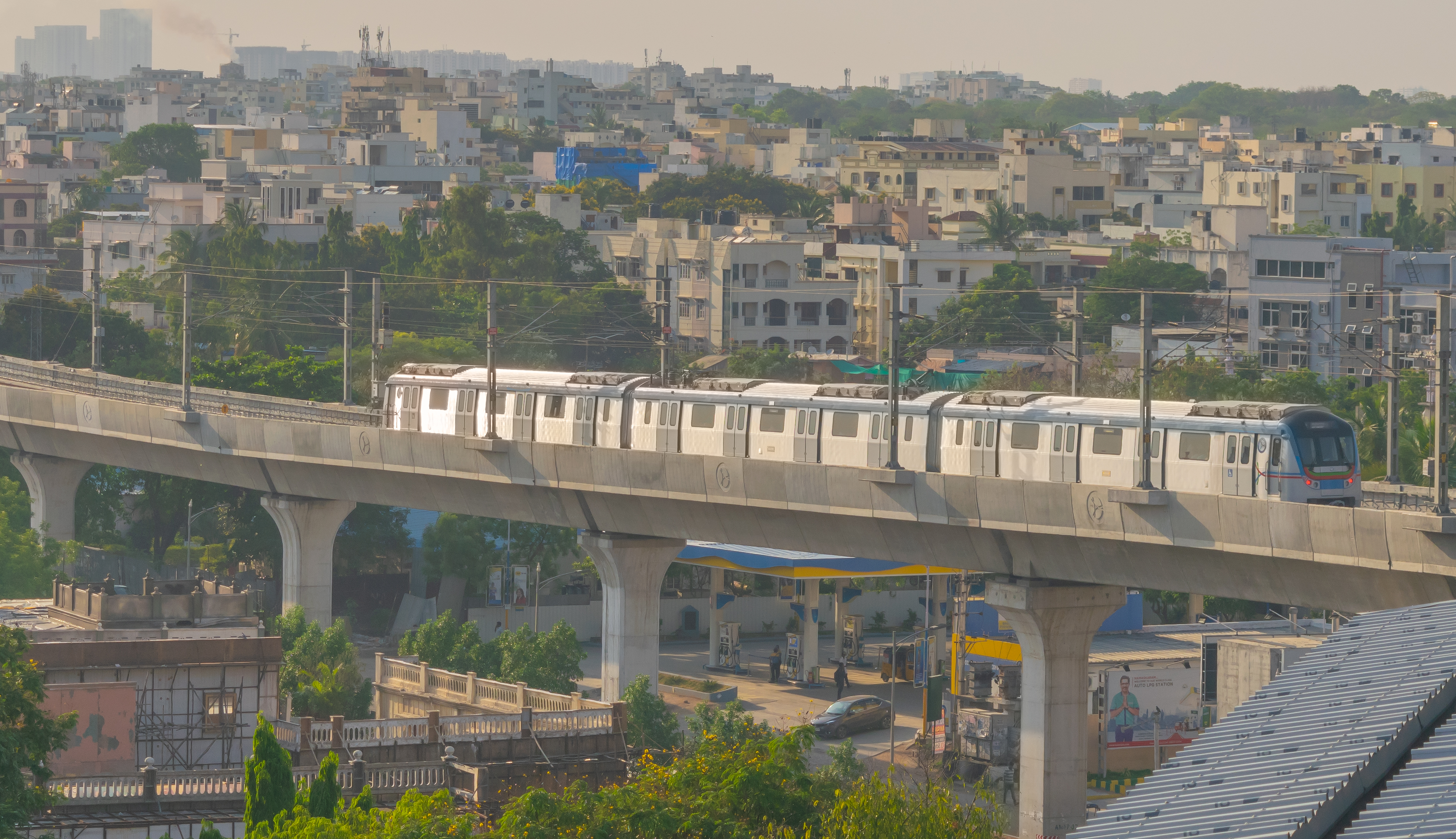
Blue Line of Hyderabad Metro

Since the first version of the plans, the three corridors mostly remained the same, but minor changes were introduced. These include the lack of stop at Lalaguda, or a stop at Lakdikapul instead of Secretariat. Also, the lines have been marked with several different combinations of color. Ameerpet- LB Nagar metro stretch opened on 24 September 2018. HiTec City to Raidurg, 1.5-kilometre (0.93 mi) stretch on Corridor Three - Nagole to Raidurg, was opened on 29 November 2019, as it involves construction of 49 pillars and the Raidurg terminal station.

=== Red Line: Miyapur–L.B. Nagar ===
Route length – 29.21 km (18.15 mi)
Number of stations (all elevated) – 27
Link to other corridors

- At Ameerpet – connecting corridors 1 and 3
- At Mahatma Gandhi Bus Station – connecting corridors 1 and 2

#	Station name	Opened	Connections	Alignment
1	Miyapur	29 November 2017	None	Elevated
2	J.N.T.U College	29 November 2017	None	Elevated
3	K.P.H.B. Colony	29 November 2017	None	Elevated
4	Kukatpally	29 November 2017	None	Elevated
5	Balanagar	29 November 2017	None	Elevated
6	Moosapet	29 November 2017	None	Elevated
7	Bharat Nagar	29 November 2017	None	Elevated
8	Erragadda	29 November 2017	None	Elevated
9	ESI Hospital	29 November 2017	None	Elevated
10	S.R Nagar	29 November 2017	None	Elevated
11	Ameerpet	29 November 2017	Blue Line	Elevated
12	Punjagutta	24 September 2018	None	Elevated
13	Irrum Manzil	24 September 2018	None	Elevated
14	Khairatabad	24 September 2018	None	Elevated
15	Lakdi-ka-pul	24 September 2018	None	Elevated
16	Assembly	24 September 2018	None	Elevated
17	Nampally	24 September 2018	None	Elevated
18	Gandhi Bhavan	24 September 2018	None	Elevated
19	Osmania Medical College	24 September 2018	None	Elevated
20	M.G. Bus Station	24 September 2018	Green Line	Elevated
21	Malakpet	24 September 2018	None	Elevated
22	New Market	24 September 2018	None	Elevated
23	Musarambagh	24 September 2018	None	Elevated
24	Dilsukhnagar	24 September 2018	None	Elevated
25	Chaitanyapuri	24 September 2018	None	Elevated
26	Victoria Memorial	24 September 2018	None	Elevated
27	L.B. Nagar	24 September 2018	Purple Line	Elevated

=== Green Line: JBS–MGBS ===
Route length – 11 km (6.8 mi)
Number of stations (all elevated) – 10
Link to other corridors

- At Mahatma Gandhi Bus Station – connecting corridors 2 and 1

#	Station name	Opened	Connections	Alignment
1	JBS Parade Ground	7 February 2020	None	Elevated
2	Parade Ground	7 February 2020	Blue Line	Elevated
3	Secunderabad West	7 February 2020	None	Elevated
4	Gandhi Hospital	7 February 2020	None	Elevated
5	Musheerabad	7 February 2020	None	Elevated
6	R.T.C. Cross Roads	7 February 2020	None	Elevated
7	Chikkadpally	7 February 2020	None	Elevated
8	Narayanguda	7 February 2020	None	Elevated
9	Sultan Bazaar	7 February 2020	None	Elevated
10	M.G. Bus Station	7 February 2020	Red Line	Elevated

=== Blue Line: Raidurg-Nagole ===
Route length – 27 km (17 mi)
Number of stations (all elevated) – 23
Link to other corridors

- At Ameerpet – connecting corridors 3 and 1
- At Parade Ground – connecting corridors 3 and 2

#	Station name	Opened	Connections	Alignment
1	Raidurg	29 November 2019	None	Elevated
2	HITEC City	20 March 2019	None	Elevated
3	Durgam Cheruvu	20 March 2019	None	Elevated
4	Madhapur	13 April 2019	None	Elevated
5	Peddamma Gudi	30 March 2019	None	Elevated
6	Jubilee Hills Check Post	18 May 2019	None	Elevated
7	Jubilee Hills Road No. 5	20 March 2019	None	Elevated
8	Yousufguda	20 March 2019	None	Elevated
9	Madhura Nagar	20 March 2019	None	Elevated
10	Ameerpet	29 November 2017	Red Line	Elevated
11	Begumpet	29 November 2017	None	Elevated
12	Prakash Nagar	29 November 2017	None	Elevated
13	Rasoolpura	29 November 2017	None	Elevated
14	Paradise	29 November 2017	None	Elevated
15	Parade Ground	29 November 2017	Green Line	Elevated
16	Secunderabad East	29 November 2017	None	Elevated
17	Mettuguda	29 November 2017	None	Elevated
18	Tarnaka	29 November 2017	None	Elevated
19	Habsiguda	29 November 2017	None	Elevated
20	NGRI	29 November 2017	None	Elevated
21	Stadium	29 November 2017	None	Elevated
22	Uppal	29 November 2017	None	Elevated
23	Nagole	29 November 2017	Purple Line	Elevated

== Phase 2 Metro stations and lines ==
=== Corridor IV: Nagole- RGIA ===
Also known as the Purple Line to Rajiv Gandhi International Airport

==== Interchanges ====
Passenger interchange facilities, connecting to other metro and railway lines, are provided at the following stations:

- Nagole (connects to the Blue Line, which runs between Raidurg and Nagole)
- LB Nagar (connects to the Red Line, which runs between Miyapur and LB Nagar)
- Chandrayangutta (connects to the Green Line, which runs between JBS Parade Ground and Falaknuma)

Route length – 36.6 km (22.7 mi)
Number of stations (all elevated) – 24

#	Station name	Opening	Connections	Alignment
1	Nagole (Airport)	29 November 2017	Blue Line	Elevated
2	Alkapuri Junction	2030	None	Elevated
3	Kamineni Hospitals	2030	None	Elevated
4	Nagole X Road	2030	None	Elevated
5	L.B. Nagar (Airport)	24 September 2018	Red Line	Elevated
6	Bairamalguda	2030	None	Elevated
7	Maitri Nagar	2030	None	Elevated
8	Karmanghat	2030	None	Elevated
9	Champapet Road	2030	None	Elevated
10	Owaisi Hospitals	2030	None	Elevated
11	DRDO Kanchanbagh	2030	None	Elevated
12	Balapur Road	2030	None	Elevated
13	Chandrayangutta	2030	Green Line	Elevated
14	Bandlaguda Road	2030	None	Elevated
15	Mailardevpally	2030	None	Elevated
16	Kattedan	2030	None	Elevated
17	Aramghar	2030	None	Elevated
18	New High Court	2030	None	Elevated
19	Gaganpahad	2030	None	Elevated
20	Satamrai	2030	None	Elevated
21	Siddanthi	2030	None	Elevated
22	Shamshabad	2030	None	Elevated
23	Cargo	2030	None	Elevated
24	RGIA	2030	None	Underground

=== Blue Line Extension: Raidurg-Kokapet Neopolis ===
Route length – 11.6 km (7.2 mi)
Number of stations (all elevated) – 11

==== Intercharges ====
- At Raidurg - connecting corridors 1

#	Station name	Opening	Connections	Alignment
1	Raidurg	29 November 2019	Blue Line	Elevated
2	Biodiversity Junction	2030	None	Elevated
3	Khajaguda	2030	None	Elevated
4	Nanakramguda	2030	None	Elevated
5	Golf Course	2030	None	Elevated
6	Wipro Circle	2030	None	Elevated
7	Puppalaguda	Future Station	None	Elevated
8	ORR Junction	2030	None	Elevated
9	Khanapur	2030	None	Elevated
10	Movie Towers	2030	None	Elevated
11	Kokapet Neopolis	2030	None	Elevated

=== Red Line Extension: Miyapur-Patancheruvu ===
==== Intercharges ====
- At Miyapur - connecting corridors 3

Route length – 13.4 km (8.3 mi)
Number of stations (all elevated) – 11

#	Station name	Opening	Connections	Alignment
1	Miyapur	24 September 2018	Red Line	Elevated
2	Miyapur X Roads	2028	None	Elevated
3	Alwyn X Roads	2028	None	Elevated
4	Madinaguda	2028	None	Elevated
5	Chandanagar	2028	None	Elevated
6	BHEL	2028	None	Elevated
7	Jyothinagar	2028	None	Elevated
8	Beeramguda	2028	None	Elevated
9	RC Puram	2028	None	Elevated
10	ICRISAT	2028	None	Elevated
11	Patancheruvu	2028	None	Elevated

=== Red Line Extension: LB Nagar-Hayathnagar Khalsa ===
Route length – 7.1 km (4.4 mi)
Number of stations (all elevated) – 7

==== Intercharges ====
- At LB Nagar – connecting corridors 3 and 4

#	Station name	Opening	Connections	Alignment
1	L.B. Nagar	24 September 2018	Red Line Purple Line	Elevated
2	Chintalakuntha	2030	None	Elevated
3	Vanasthalipuram	2030	None	Elevated
4	Auto Nagar	2030	None	Elevated
5	Lecturers' Colony	2030	None	Elevated
6	RTC Colony	2030	None	Elevated
7	Hayathnagar Khalsa	2030	None	Elevated

=== Green Line Extension: MGBS-Chandrayangutta ===
Earlier in 2010, All India Majlis-e-Ittehadul Muslimeen suggested an alternate route for the metro in the old city through Purana pul, Muslimjung, Bahadurpura, Zoo Park, Tadbun junction, Kalapathar, Misrigunj and Shamsheergunj to Falaknuma. However, this 7.4 kilometres (4.6 mi) route was not accepted. The eastern parts of the old city have access to the metro via the Malakpet metro station. A 5.5 kilometres (3.4 mi)-long green line in the old city will pass through Dar-ul-Shifa, Salar Jung Museum, Charminar, Shah-Ali-Banda, Shamsheer Gunj, and Jungametta, and end at Falaknuma. In June 2022, Hyderabad Metro Rail started a fresh survey of the Old City route from MGBS for underground utilities. The survey is through the Lidar, Global Positioning System and inertial measurement unit and the plan is to build the elevated line alongside Musi river and center of the road. In July 2023, Telangana Chief minister K. Chandrashekar Rao instructed the municipal administration and L&T chairman to take forward the metro project in the old city. On 16 July 2023, Hyderabad Metro MD NVS Reddy stated that preparatory works for taking up Metro Rail works in the old city had started and land acquisition notices for 1,100 affected properties would be issued in about a month. All the five metro stations in the old city were to have 120-feet wide roads under the viaduct. On 27 August 2023, Hyderabad Metro Rail Limited started a drone survey of the proposed rail alignment in the old city.

Route length – 7.5 km (4.7 mi)
Number of stations (all elevated) – 8

==== Intercharges ====
- At MGBS- connecting corridors 2 and 3
- At Chandrayangutta – connecting corridors 4

#	Station name	Opening	Connections	Alignment
1	M.G. Bus Station	8 February 2020	Green Line	Elevated
2	Salarjung Museum	Yet to start construction	None	Elevated
3	Charminar	Yet to start construction	None	Elevated
4	Shah-Ali-Banda	Yet to start construction	None	Elevated
5	Shamsheergunj	Yet to start construction	None	Elevated
6	Aliabad	Yet to start construction	None	Elevated
7	Falaknuma	Yet to start construction	None	Elevated
8	Chandrayangutta	2030	Purple Line	Elevated

== Statistics ==
Total number of metro stations	57
Number of interchange stations	3
Number of elevated stations	57
Number of underground stations	0
Number of stations at-grade	0
Number of Phase 2 stations	54
Number of Phase 2 elevated stations	53
Number of Phase 2 underground stations	1

== See also ==
- List of Ahmedabad Metro stations
- List of Chennai Metro stations
- List of Coimbatore Metro stations
- List of Delhi Metro stations
- List of Jaipur Metro stations
- List of Kochi Metro stations
- List of Kolkata Metro stations
- List of Lucknow Metro stations
- List of Madurai Metro stations
- List of Mumbai Metro stations
- List of Noida Metro stations
- List of Nagpur Metro stations
- List of Namma Metro stations
- List of Navi Mumbai Metro Stations
- List of Pune Metro stations
- List of Surat Metro stations
