= Blue Line (Hyderabad Metro) =

Line of Hyderabad's metro

Overview
- Owner: Larsen & Toubro (90%); Government of Telangana (10%)
- Locale: Hyderabad, Telangana, India
- Termini: Raidurg; Nagole
- Stations: 23

Service
- Type: Metro
- System: Hyderabad Metro
- Operator: Hyderabad Metro Rail Ltd. (HMRL)
- Depot: Uppal
- Rolling stock: Hyundai Rotem

History
- Opened: 29 November 2017; 8 years ago
- Last extension: 2019

Technical
- Line length: 27 km (17 mi)
- Character: Elevated
- Track gauge: 1,435 mm (4 ft 8 1/2 in) standard gauge
- Electrification: 25 kV, AC Overhead catenary
- Operating speed: 80 km/h (50 mph)

The Blue Line is a part of the Hyderabad Metro system in Telangana, India. The line is 27 km long and spans 23 stations from Nagole to Raidurg. It was funded by a public–private partnership (PPP), with the state government holding a minority equity stake. A special purpose vehicle company, L&T Metro Rail Hyderabad Ltd (L&TMRHL), was established by the construction company Larsen & Toubro (L&T) to develop the Hyderabad Metro rail project.

The groundbreaking (Bhoomi Puja) for the project was conducted on 26 April 2012, and construction began with pillar erection on the same day. A 16.8-kilometre (10.4-mile) stretch of the Blue Line from Nagole to Ameerpet, with 14 stations, was inaugurated on 28 November 2017 by Prime Minister Narendra Modi, and opened to the public the next day The 10 km section between Ameerpet and HITEC City, with 8 stations, was opened on 20 March 2019. Three stations on the section were opened later. Peddamma Gudi, Madhapur, and Jubilee Hills Check Post were opened on 30 March, 13 April and 18 May 2019 respectively.

The final 1.5 km section from HITEC City to Raidurg was opened on 29 November 2019. Authorities decided not to construct the proposed Cyber Gateway station which would have been located between HITEC City to Raidurg stations because they felt that there was "too short a distance" between Cyber Gateway and the Raidurg terminus. As a result, the Blue Line has 23 stations instead of the originally proposed 24.

In phase 2, Hyderabad Airport will connected by metro from Raidurg metro station and the Blue Line is proposed to be extended by 5 km from Nagole to LB Nagar. Blue Line will further be extended by 800 metres for multi-level Raidurg station, from where Hyderabad Airport Metro Express will commence. The alignment to Shamshabad RGI Airport from the Raidurg metro station will be through Khajaguda - Nanakramguda Road. The 31 km-long Hyderabad Airport Express Metro link will cost around ₹6,250 crore (US$650 million).

== Construction ==
Blue Line sections were opened as indicated below.

Blue Line
Stage	Extension date	Terminal Stations		Length	Stations
1	29 November 2017	Ameerpet	Nagole	16.8 km	14
3/1	20 March 2019	HITEC City	Ameerpet	10 km	8
3/2	29 November 2019	Raidurg	HITEC City	1.5 km	1
Total		Raidurg	Nagole	27 km (17 mi)	23

== Stations ==
There are 23 operational stations on the Blue Line along with 10 proposed stations. All stations are elevated.

=== Interchanges ===
Passenger interchange facilities, connecting to other railway lines, will be provided at the following stations:

- Ameerpet (Connects to the Red Line, which runs from Miyapur to LB Nagar)
- Parade Ground (Connects to the Green Line, which runs from JBS Parade Ground to M.G. Bus Station and to the Jubilee Bus Station)
- Secunderabad East (Connects to the Secunderabad railway station)
- Begumpet (Connects to the Begumpet railway station)
- Nagole (Connects to the proposed Corridor IV, which runs from Nagole to RGIA)

Blue Line
#	Station Name		Opened	Connections	Alignment
#	English	Telugu	Opened	Connections	Alignment
1	Kokapet Neopolis	కోకాపేట్ నియోపోలిస్	Proposed	None	Elevated
2	Movie Towers	సినిమా టవర్స్	Proposed	None	Elevated
3	Khanapur	ఖానాపూర్	Proposed	None	Elevated
4	ORR Junction	ఓ ఆర్ ఆర్ జంక్షన్	Proposed	None	Elevated
5	Puppalguda	పుప్పల్‌గూడ	Proposed	None	Elevated
6	Wipro Circle	విప్రో సర్కిల్	Proposed	None	Elevated
7	Golf Course	గోల్ఫ్ కోర్స్	Proposed	None	Elevated
8	Nanakramguda	నానక్రంగూడ	Proposed	None	Elevated
9	Khajaguda	ఖాజాగూడ	Proposed	None	Elevated
10	Biodiversity Junction	జీవవైవిధ్య జంక్షన్	Proposed	None	Elevated
11	Raidurg	రాయదుర్గ్	29 November 2019	Airport Shuttle	Elevated
12	HITEC City	హైటెక్ సిటీ	20 March 2019	Airport Shuttle	Elevated
13	Durgam Cheruvu	దుర్గం చెరువు	20 March 2019	None	Elevated
14	Madhapur	మాదాపూర్	13 April 2019	None	Elevated
15	Peddamma Gudi	పెద్దమ్మ గుడి	30 March 2019	None	Elevated
16	Jubilee Hills Check Post	జూబ్లీహిల్స్ చెక్ పోస్ట్	18 May 2019	None	Elevated
17	Road No 5 Jubilee Hills	రోడ్ నెం.5 జూబ్లీ హిల్స్	20 March 2019	None	Elevated
18	Yusufguda	యూసుఫ్‌గూడ	20 March 2019	None	Elevated
19	Taruni Madhura Nagar	మధుర నగర్	20 March 2019	None	Elevated
20	Ameerpet	అమీర్‌పేట	29 November 2017	Red Line	Elevated
21	Begumpet	బేగంపేట	29 November 2017	Begumpet; Airport Shuttle	Elevated
22	Prakash Nagar	ప్రకాష్ నగర్	29 November 2017	None	Elevated
23	Rasoolpura	రసూల్‌పురా	29 November 2017	None	Elevated
24	Paradise	ప్యారడైజ్	29 November 2017	Airport Shuttle	Elevated
25	Parade Ground	పరేడ్ గ్రౌండ్	29 November 2017	Jubilee Bus Station; Green Line	Elevated
26	Secunderabad East	సికింద్రాబాద్ తూర్పు	29 November 2017	Secunderabad Junction; Airport Shuttle	Elevated
27	Mettuguda	మెట్టుగూడ	29 November 2017	None	Elevated
28	Tarnaka	తార్నాక	29 November 2017	Airport Shuttle	Elevated
29	Habsiguda	హబ్సిగూడ	29 November 2017	None	Elevated
30	NGRI	ఎన్ జి ఆర్ ఐ	29 November 2017	None	Elevated
31	Stadium	స్టేడియం	29 November 2017	None	Elevated
32	Uppal	ఉప్పల్	29 November 2017	Airport Shuttle	Elevated
33	Nagole	నాగోల్	29 November 2017	Purple Line (Proposed)	Elevated

== See also ==
- Transport in Hyderabad
- List of Hyderabad Metro stations
- Yellow Line (Delhi Metro)
