= Secunderabad East metro station =

Metro station in Hyderabad, India

Secunderabad East
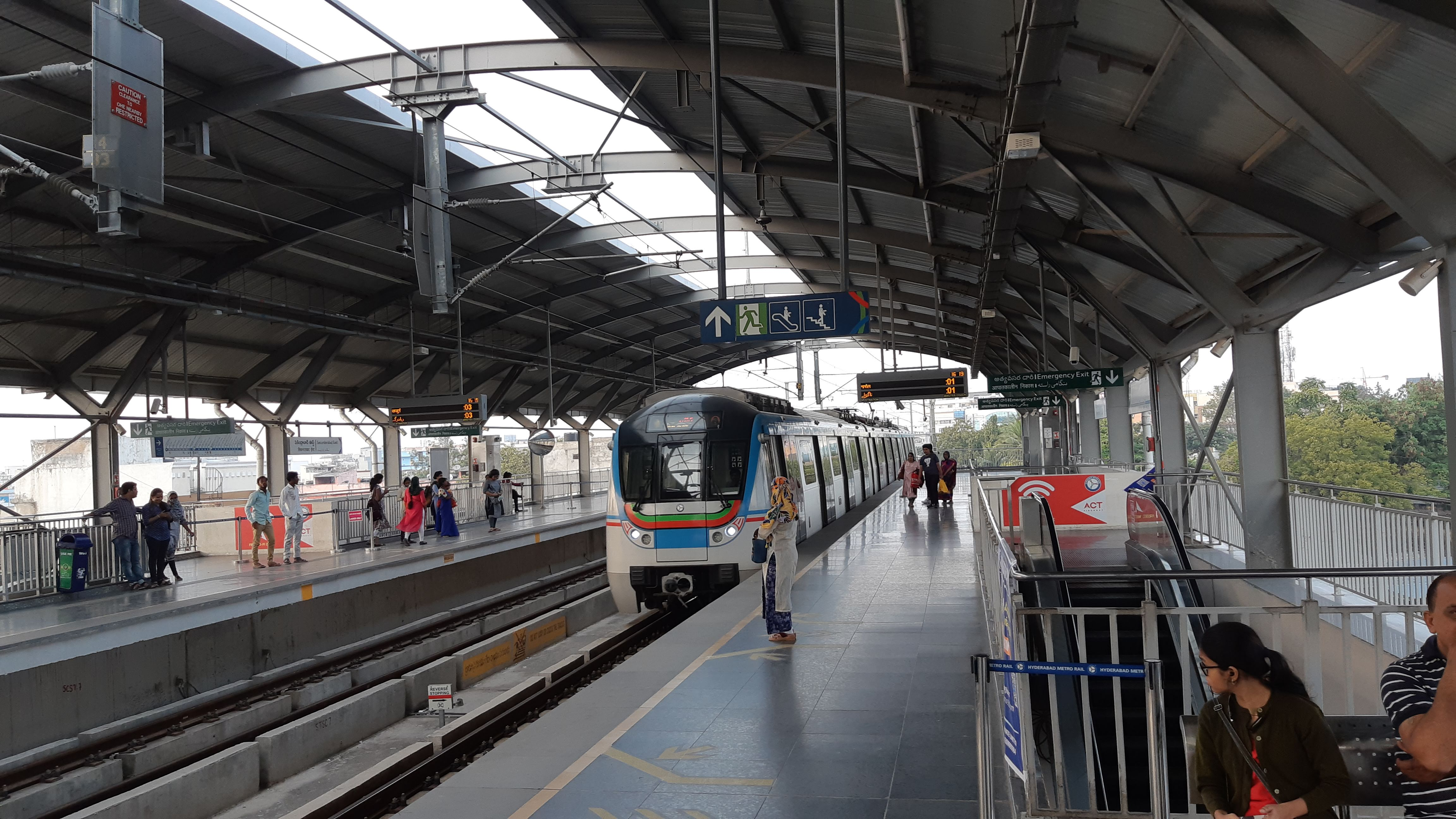

General information
- Location: Secunderabad Junction railway station, Secunderabad
- Coordinates: 17°26′01″N 78°30′06″E
- System: Hyderabad Metro station
- Owner: Hyderabad Metro
- Line: Blue Line
- Platforms: 2
- Tracks: 2
- Connections: Secunderabad Junction

Construction
- Structure type: Elevated
- Platform levels: 1
- Parking: Available

History
- Opened: 28 November 2017; 8 years ago

Services
Preceding station	Hyderabad Metro	Following station
Parade Ground towards Raidurg	Blue Line	Mettuguda towards Nagole
Location
- Location within Hyderabad

The Secunderabad East metro station is located on the Blue Line of the Hyderabad Metro, in India. It is part of Corridor I of the Hyderabad Metro starting from Raidurg to Nagole.

== History ==
It was opened to the public on 28 November 2017.

== Facilities ==
Secunderabad East metro station is near to Secunderabad Junction railway station. There are free metro feeder services from Secunderabad East metro station to Secunderabad railway station. There is a foot overbridge between Secunderabad East Metro Station and TSRTC Rathifile Bus Station (Secunderabad). Secunderabad Railway Station is near to the bridge. A skywalk is under construction to connect Secunderabad railway station with Metro station. A specific gate number 5 on platform 1 of Secunderabad Junction railway station has been designated to direct people to the closest route to the metro station.
