= Tarnaka =

- Neighborhood
- Location in Hyderabad Tarnaka (India)
- Coordinates: 17.4279°N 78.5360°E
- Country: India
- State: Telangana
- District: Hyderabad District
- City: Hyderabad

Government
  - Body: GHMC

Languages
  - Official: Telugu
- Time zone: UTC+5:30 (IST)
- PIN: 500017
- Vehicle registration: TS 10
- Lok Sabha constituency: Secunderabad
- Vidhan Sabha constituency: Secunderabad
- Planning agency: GHMC
- Website: telangana.gov.in

Tarnaka is a major residential and industrial locality in Hyderabad, Telangana, India. Tarnaka literally translates as "wired checkpost". In the local language (Hyderabadi) Tar means wire/cable and naka means check post. Tarnaka used to have a vineyard during the Nizams period. An area called Kimtee colony got its name from the vineyards called Keemthi Gardens.

The former chief minister of Andhra Pradesh Chenna Reddy was a resident of Tarnaka. St. Ann's school was a landmark few decades back; it was a white building, hence the area was also called "White House". Osmania university is located in this area.

== History ==
The area was predominantly inhabited by Tamil mudaliar community before Independence. The land records clearly showed huge jagirdar from the community.As time passed they moved out and the Mudaliars, who were camp followers of the British, made immense contributions for the growth of education and health care. This explained the growth of the Secunderabad Club from a public room, as stated by Narendra Luther, who is an authority in Hyderabad history. This area had big vineyards and every nook and corner was checkered with large trees.

Until the IT boom hit Hyderabad, this place was one of the most serene ones to reside, with large bungalows and villas. The huge mango, gulmohar, Ashoka and tamarind trees spread over the roads provided huge shadows and an extremely pleasant feel in hot summer. Tarnaka was a well planned and organised place which old timers would swear. At turn of the new millennium — with IT revolution hitting hard with large influx of population and settlers — the area swelled with many more apartments and commercial buildings giving a complete new look. The tree canopy was so dense that people never needed to bother about shade in summer. Even today the area does have its trees and vegetation which may not be as dense but still has the glimpses of past. South Lallaguda is a nearby area, which together with the area around Mettuguda used to be known as Little England, due to cluster of an Anglo Indian community that primarily consisted of employees at the Secunderabad Railway carriage workshop.

== Transport ==
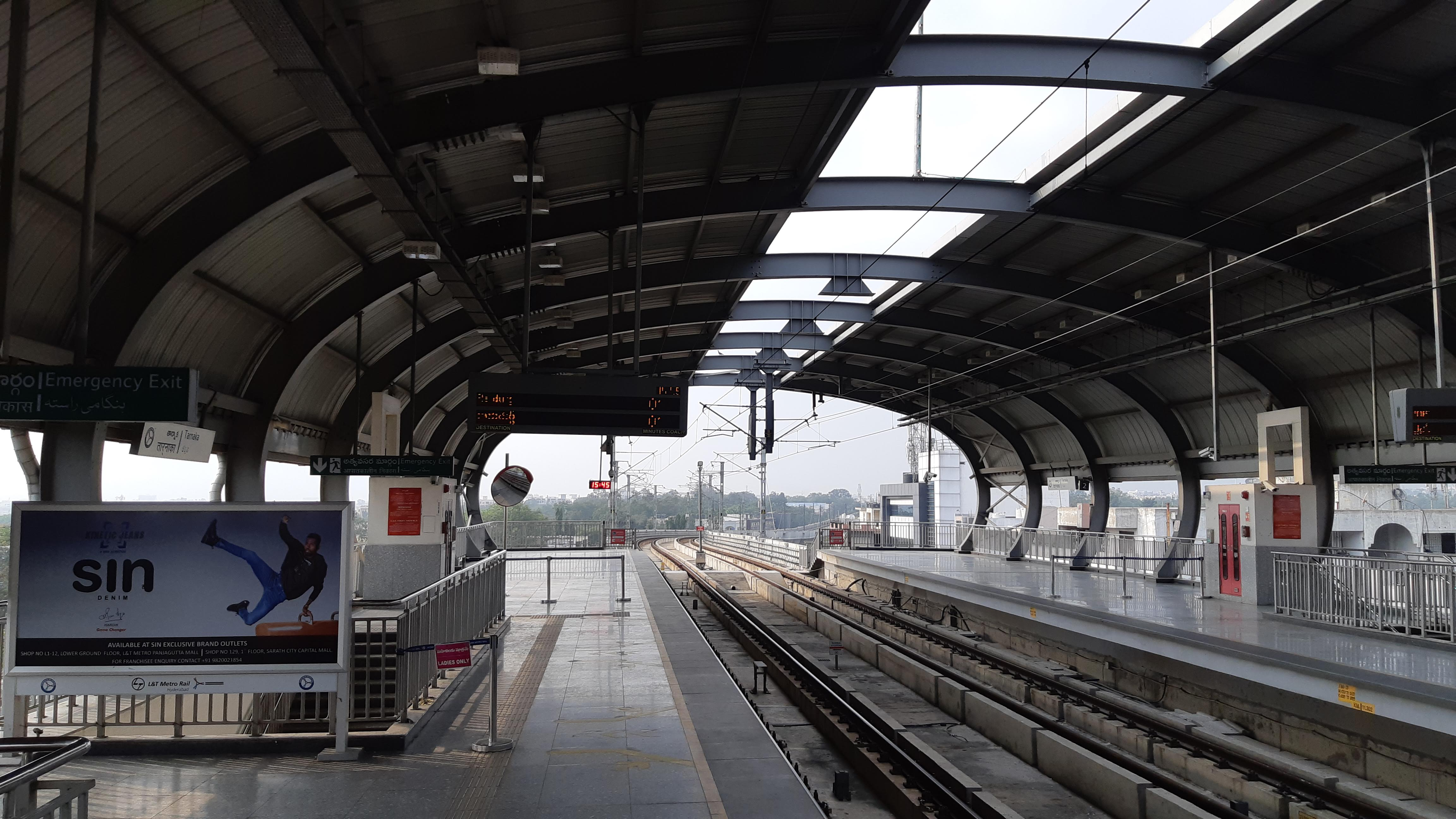
Tarnaka Metro Station

Tarnaka is well connected by TSRTC and the Hyderabad Metro.

== Commercial area ==
The shopping area has big shopping malls like Reliance Smart and corner grocery stores. Tarnaka has shops which cater to all possible needs. There is a cinema theater called Aradhana 70 mm, which is visited by Osmania University students and residents.

== Institutions ==
- National Institute of Nutrition
- Indian Institute of Chemical Technology
- Centre for Cellular & Molecular Biology
- National Mineral Development Corporation, R & D Centre
- Indian Statistical Institute
- Central Food & Technological Research Institute
- Osmania University
- The English and Foreign Languages University
- Centre for Cellular and Molecular Biology
- National Geographycal Research Institute
- Hyderabad Metropolitan Development Authority
- Andhra Pradesh State Archives and Research Institute
- Narsee Monjee Institute of Management Studies
