= Green Line (Hyderabad Metro) =

Line of Hyderabad's metro

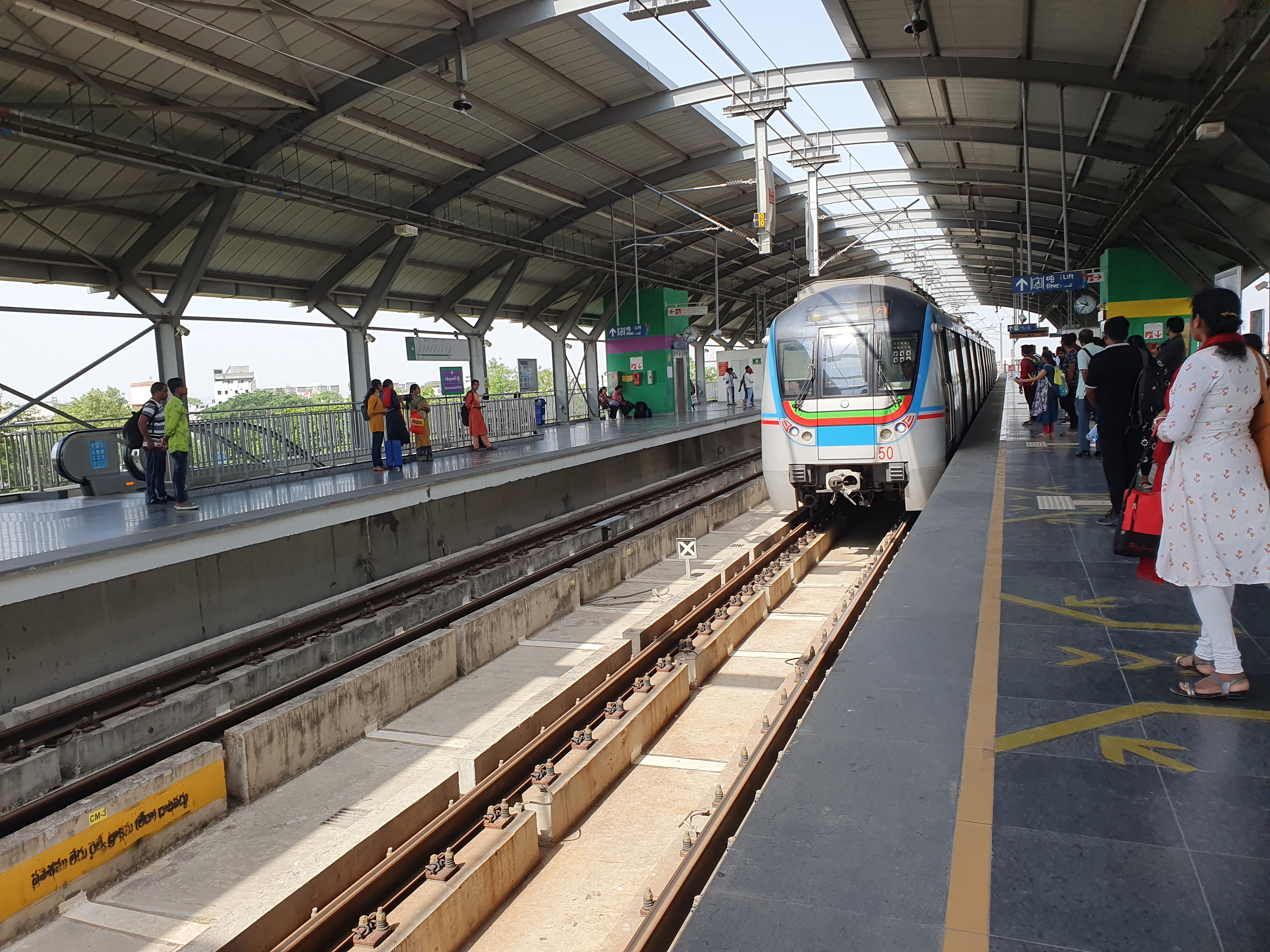
- Metro train arriving at Secunderabad West metro station

Overview
- Other name: Corridor – II
- Status: Operational
- Locale: Hyderabad
- Termini: JBS Parade Ground; Falaknuma
- Connecting lines: Blue Line; Red Line; Purple Line
- Stations: 15 (9 opened, 6 yet to open)

Service
- Type: Rapid transit
- System: Hyderabad Metro
- Operator: Hyderabad Metro Rail Ltd. (HMRL)
- Depot: Falaknuma
- Rolling stock: Hyundai Rotem

History
- Opened: 8 February 2020; 6 years ago

Technical
- Line length: 16.6 km (10.3 mi)
- Num of tracks: Double-track
- Character: Elevated
- Track gauge: 1,435 mm (4 ft 8 1/2 in) standard gauge
- Electrification: 25 kV 50 Hz AC Overhead catenary
- Operating speed: 80 km/h (50 mph)
- Signalling: CBTC
Route map
Hyderabad Metro Green Line highlighted in green

The Green Line is a part of the Hyderabad Metro system in Telangana, India. The line is 16.6 km long and spans 15 stations from JBS Parade Ground to Falaknuma. It was funded by a public–private partnership (PPP), with the state government holding a minority equity stake. A special purpose vehicle company, L&T Metro Rail Hyderabad Ltd (L&TMRHL), was established by the construction company Larsen & Toubro (L&T) to develop the Hyderabad Metro rail project.

An 11-kilometre (6.8-mile) stretch of the Green Line from JBS Parade Ground to MG Bus Station, with 9 stations, was inaugurated on 7 February 2020 by Telangana Chief Minister K. Chandrasekhar Rao, and opened to the public the next day. A 5.6 km southward extension from MG Bus Station to Falaknuma is yet to be completed in the Old City.

== Construction ==
Green Line sections were opened as indicated below.

Green Line
| Stage | Extension date | Terminal Stations | | Length | Stations |
|---|---|---|---|---|---|
| 1 | 8 February 2020 | Parade Ground | MG Bus Station | 11 km (6.8 mi) | 9 |
| 2 | Yet to start construction | MG Bus Station | Falaknuma | 5.6 km (3.5 mi) | 6 |
| Total | | Parade Ground | Falaknuma | 16.6 km (10.3 mi) | 15 |

== Stations ==
Green Line
| # | Station Name | | | Opened | Connections | Alignment |
| # | English | Telugu | Urdu | Opened | Connections | Alignment |
|---|---|---|---|---|---|---|
| 1 | Parade Ground | జేబీస్ పెరేడ్ గ్రౌండ్ | جے بی ایس پریڈ گراؤنڈ | 8 February 2020 | Blue Line; Jubilee Bus Station | Elevated |
| 2 | Secunderabad West | సికింద్రాబాద్ వెస్ట్ | سکندرآباد ویسٹ | 8 February 2020 | Secunderabad | Elevated |
| 3 | Gandhi Hospital | గాంధీ హాస్పిటల్ | گاندھی ہسپتال | 8 February 2020 | None | Elevated |
| 4 | Musheerabad | ముషీరాబాద్ | مشیرآباد | 8 February 2020 | None | Elevated |
| 5 | R.T.C. Cross Roads | ఆర్.టి.సి క్రాస్ రోడ్ | آر ٹی سی کراس روڈز | 8 February 2020 | None | Elevated |
| 6 | Chikkadpally | చిక్కడపల్లి | چکداپلی | 8 February 2020 | None | Elevated |
| 7 | Narayanguda | నారాయణగూడ | نارائن گوڈا | 8 February 2020 | None | Elevated |
| 8 | Sultan Bazaar | సుల్తాన్ బజార్ | سلطان بازار | 8 February 2020 | None | Elevated |
| 9 | M.G. Bus Station | ఎం.జి బస్ స్టేషన్ | ایم جی بس اسٹیشن | 8 February 2020 | Red Line; Mahatma Gandhi Bus Station | Elevated |
| 10 | Salarjung Museum | సాలార్జంగ్ మ్యూజియం | سالارجنگ میوزیم | Proposed | None | Elevated |
| 11 | Charminar | చార్మినార్ | چارمینار | Proposed | None | Elevated |
| 12 | Shah-Ali-Banda | షా-అలీ-బందా | شاہ علی بندہ | Proposed | None | Elevated |
| 13 | Aliabad | అలియాబాద్ | علی آباد | Proposed | None | Elevated |
| 14 | Falaknuma | ఫలక్‌నుమా | فلک نما | Proposed | None | Elevated |
| 15 | Chandrayangutta | చాంద్రాయణగుట్ట | چندرائن گٹہ | Proposed | Purple Line (Proposed) | Elevated |
