= Secunderabad West metro station =

Secunderabad West
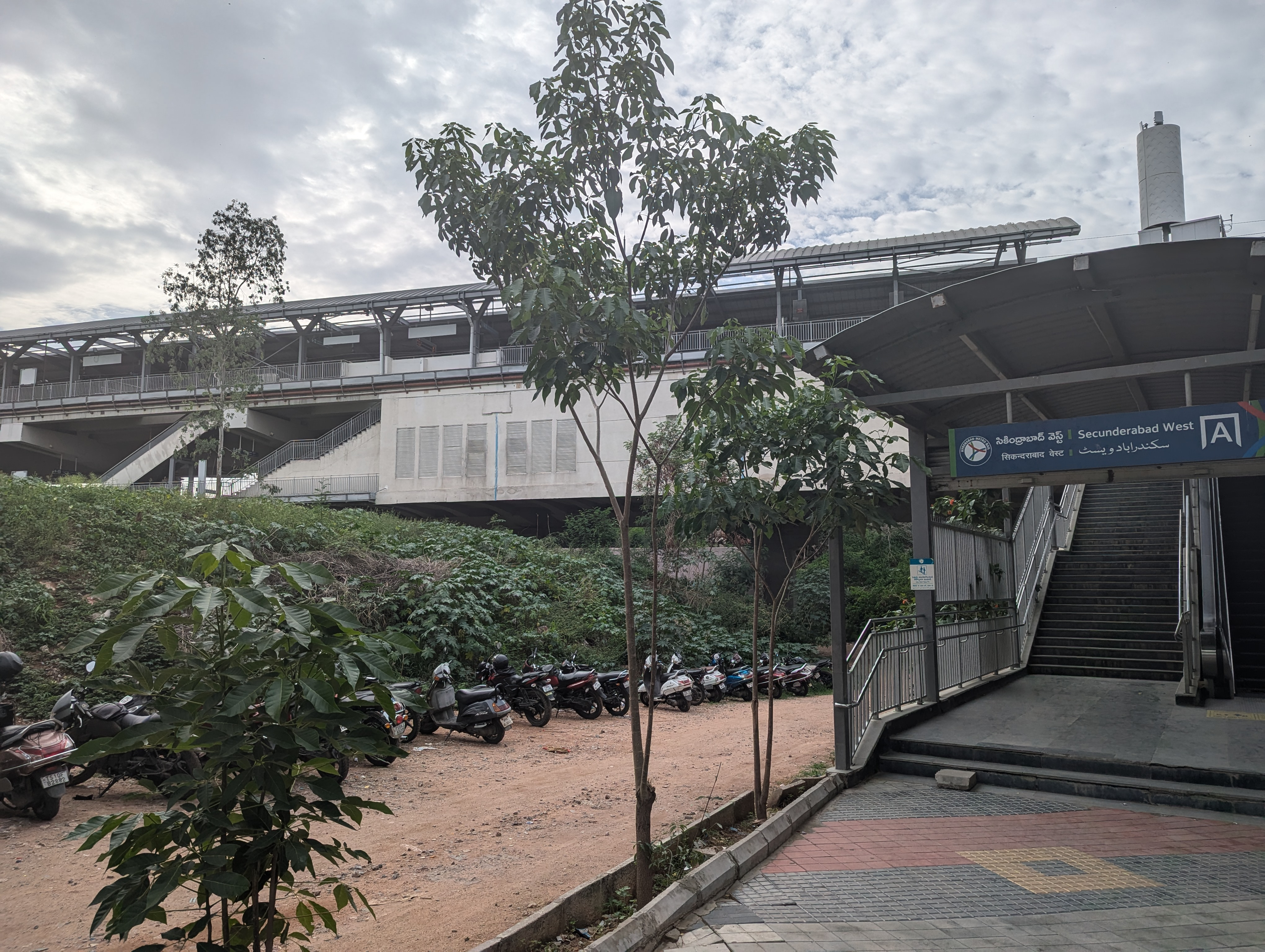
- Entrance A of Secunderabad West Metro Station, Hyderabad

General information
- Location: Railway Officer Colony, Botiguda, Takara Basthi, Secunderabad, Telangana 500003; India
- Coordinates: 17°26′02″N 78°29′55″E
- System: Hyderabad Metro station
- Operator: Hyderabad Metro
- Line: Green Line
- Platforms: Side platform Platform-1 → JBS Parade Ground; Platform-2 → MG Bus Station
- Tracks: 2
- Connections: Secunderabad Junction

Construction
- Structure type: Elevated
- Platform levels: 1
- Accessible: Yes

History
- Opened: 8 February 2020; 6 years ago

Services
Preceding station	Hyderabad Metro	Following station
JBS Parade Ground Terminus	Green Line	Gandhi Hospital towards MG Bus Station
Location
- Location within Hyderabad

Secunderabad West is an elevated metro station in the Green Line of Hyderabad Metro in Hyderabad, India. It was opened to the public on 08 February 2020.

== Station structure ==
=== Station layout ===
G	Street level	Exit/Entrance
L1	Mezzanine	Fare control, station agent, Metro Card vending machines, crossover
L2	Side platform | Doors will open on the left
L2	Platform 1 Eastbound	Towards ← JBS Parade Ground; Next station: JBS Parade Ground
L2	Platform 2 Westbound	Towards → MG Bus Station; Next station: Gandhi Hospital
L2	Side platform | Doors will open on the left
L2

== See also ==
- Hyderabad
- List of Hyderabad metro stations
- Transport in Hyderabad
- List of metro systems
- List of rapid transit systems in India
