= Raidurg metro station =

Metro station in Hyderabad, India

Synchrony @ Raidurg
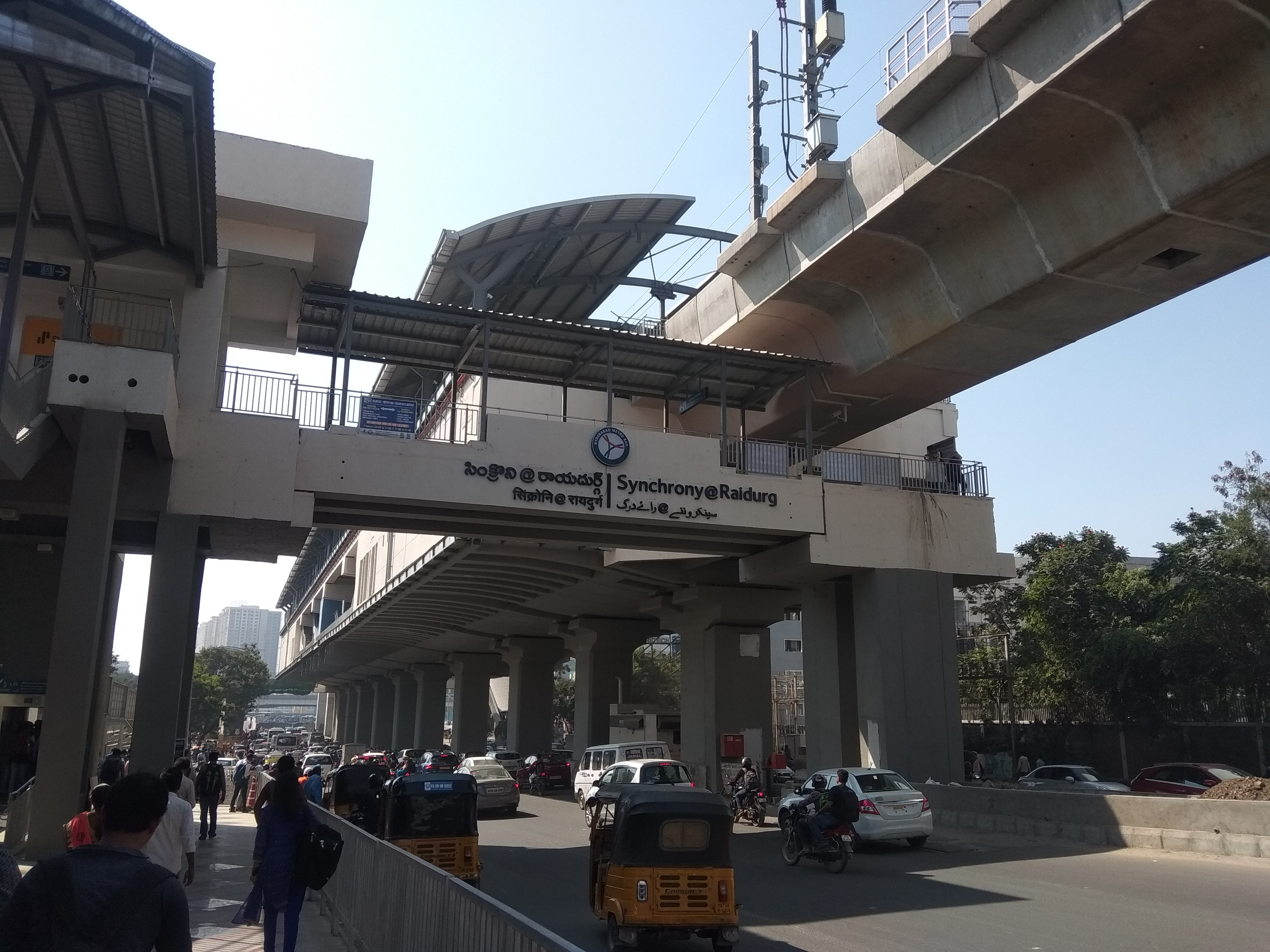
- Raidurg metro station from TCS deccan park side

General information
- Location: Raheja Mindspace Junction, opposite Lemon Tree Hotel, Raidurg
- Coordinates: 17.4422°N 78.3773°E
- System: Hyderabad Metro station
- Lines: Blue Line; Airport Express Line (under-construction)
- Tracks: 2

Construction
- Structure type: Elevated
- Depth: 7.07 m (23.2 ft)
- Platform levels: 2
- Parking: Yes

History
- Opened: 29 November 2019; 6 years ago

Services
Preceding station	Hyderabad Metro	Following station
Terminus	Blue Line	HITEC City towards Nagole
Location
- Location within Hyderabad

Raidurg (also known as Synchrony @ Raidurg) is a metro station located on the Blue Line of the Hyderabad Metro India. The station was opened on 29 November 2019, two years after first commercial operation of Hyderabad metro started. It is located near Raheja Mindspace Junction. Raidurg metro station is the busiest metro station in Hyderabad with daily footfalls of around 60,000 commuters. In February 2020, Synchrony Financial became the sponsor of the Raidurg metro station, under semi-naming policy of Hyderabad metro to generate non-fare revenues.

Raidurg station is terminal point of Blue Line. Blue Line will further be extended by 800 metres for multi-level Raidurg station, from where Phase 2 Airport Express will commence. This station was proposed in 2012. Initially, the metro rail was supposed to terminate at Shilparamam but as it was found to be a lake bed, the line was extended by a kilometre to Raidurg where a 15-acre site was earmarked. Raidurg station is opposite Lemon Tree Hotel and TCS Deccan Park. The fourth arm for entry and exit from Raidurg metro station (Arm B on Lemon Tree hotel side) was made operational on 4 April 2023. Mindspace underpass was constructed as part of Strategic road development plan (SRDP), near Raidurg metro station. In April 2022, 1 km long skywalk was inaugurated that connects Raidurg metro station to strategic locations in and around the Raheja Mindspace campus. In September 2022, Ratnadeep Supermarket was opened in Raidurg metro station. In January 2023, Telangana State Road Transport Corporation launched WiFi-enabled air-conditioned mini buses, branded as ‘Cyber Liner’, for IT employees in three corridors between Raidurg metro station and GAR IT Hub at Kokapet, Waverock and Wipro. The catchment areas of Raidurg metro station are IT hub beyond Knowledge city, and Financial District, DLF, Gachibowli, Kokapet, Biodiversity, etc.

L&T Metro Rail Hyderabad Limited is planning to build Hyderabad's biggest mall (of about one million square feet) near Raidurg metro station. In September 2022, as part of Transit-oriented development, L&T Hyderabad Metro Rail entered into a pact to sublease its prime 15-acre (0.061 km^{2}) land parcel at Raidurg Knowledge City opposite IKEA to Brookfield Group at ₹1,020 crore (US$110 million) for a 50-year lease period. In November 2022, L&T opened a new, 100,000 sq. ft. state-of-the art digital experience centre for LTIMindtree in the L&T Metro Building (L&T Next Avenue B1) opposite IKEA. In August 2023, as part of its debt restructuring, L&T Hyderabad Metro Rail received approval from Government of Telangana for leasing 15-acre (0.061 km^{2}) of land parcel at Raidurg to Rafferty Developments, a joint venture between Brookfield Corporation and K Raheja Corp, for 50 years for a consideration of over ₹1,200 crore (US$120 million).

The existing corridor three (Blue line) from Raidurg Station to the new Airport Metro Raidurg Station will be extended by about 900 meters, thus it would be an integrated four-level station, somewhat similar to JBS Station of metro corridor-2 (Green line) and Ameerpet interchange station. The extended blue line terminal station and the Airport Metro station is planned as a combined interchange station one over the other. The combined interchange station design is due to space constraints in front of L&T and Aurobindo buildings after IKEA junction. The first two levels will accommodate Airport Metro station and the top two levels will accommodate the extended blue line (Corridor 3) terminal station.

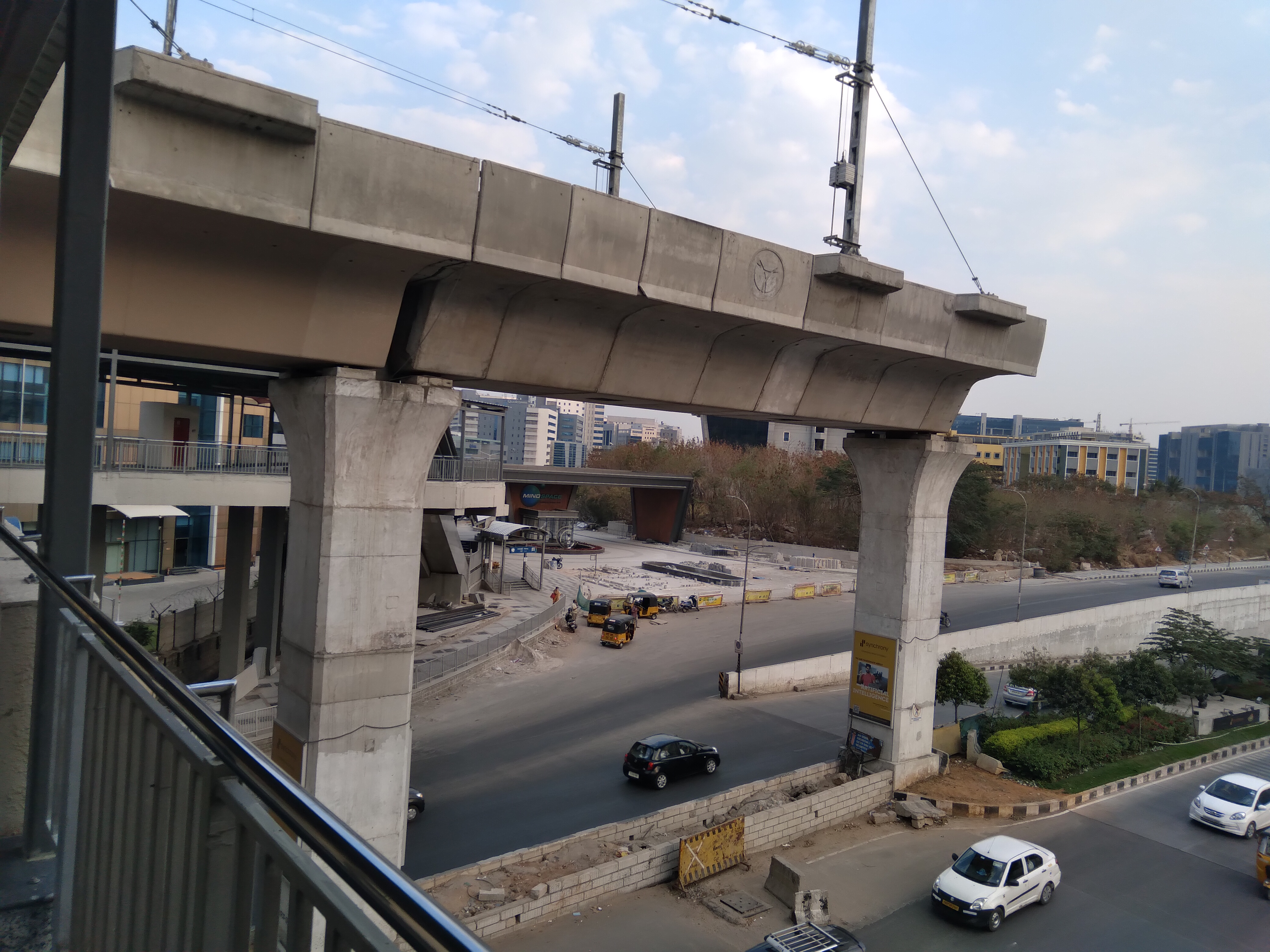
Skywalk from Raidurg metro station to Raheja Mindspace campus

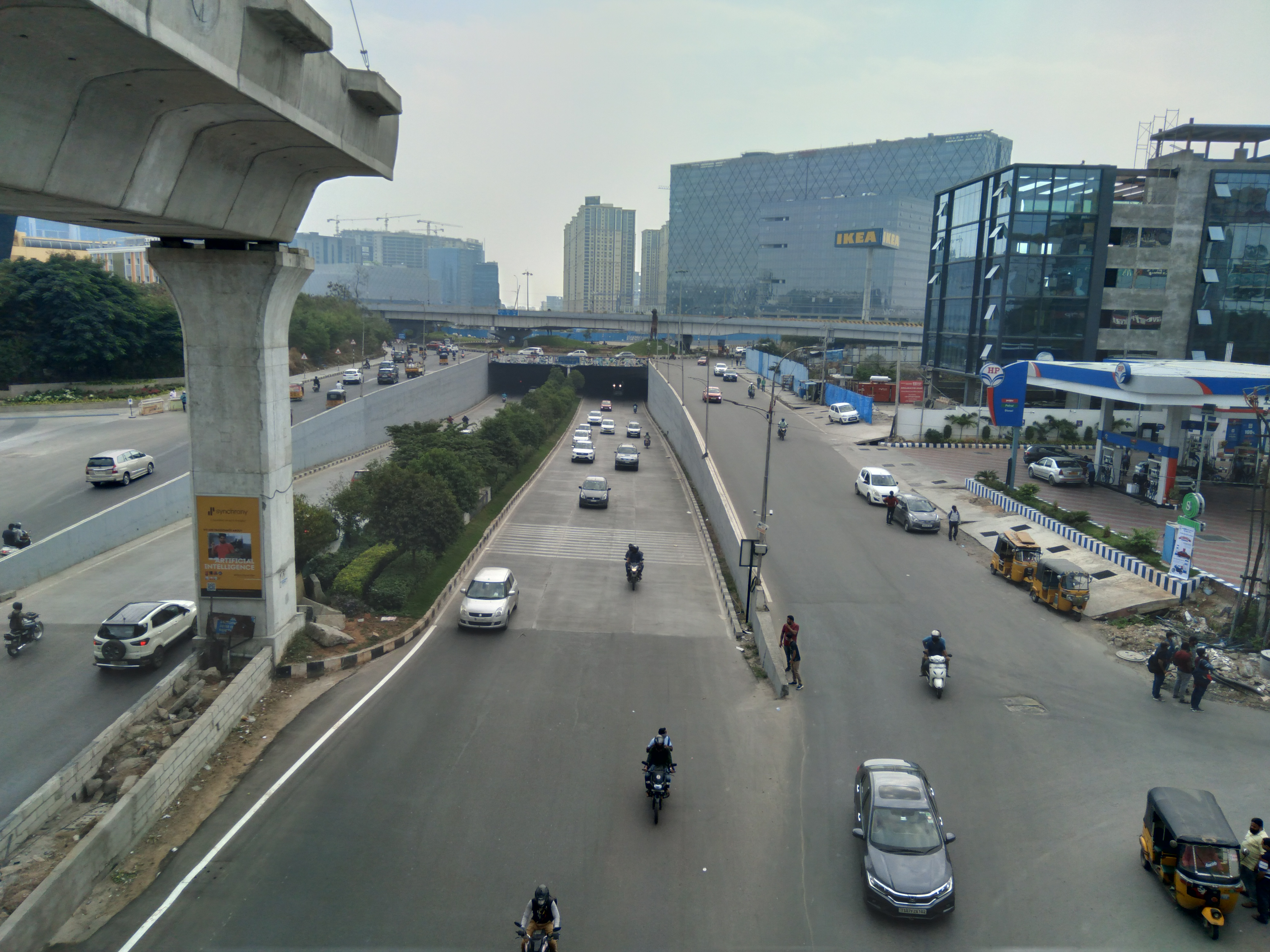
Mindspace underpass near Raidurg metro station

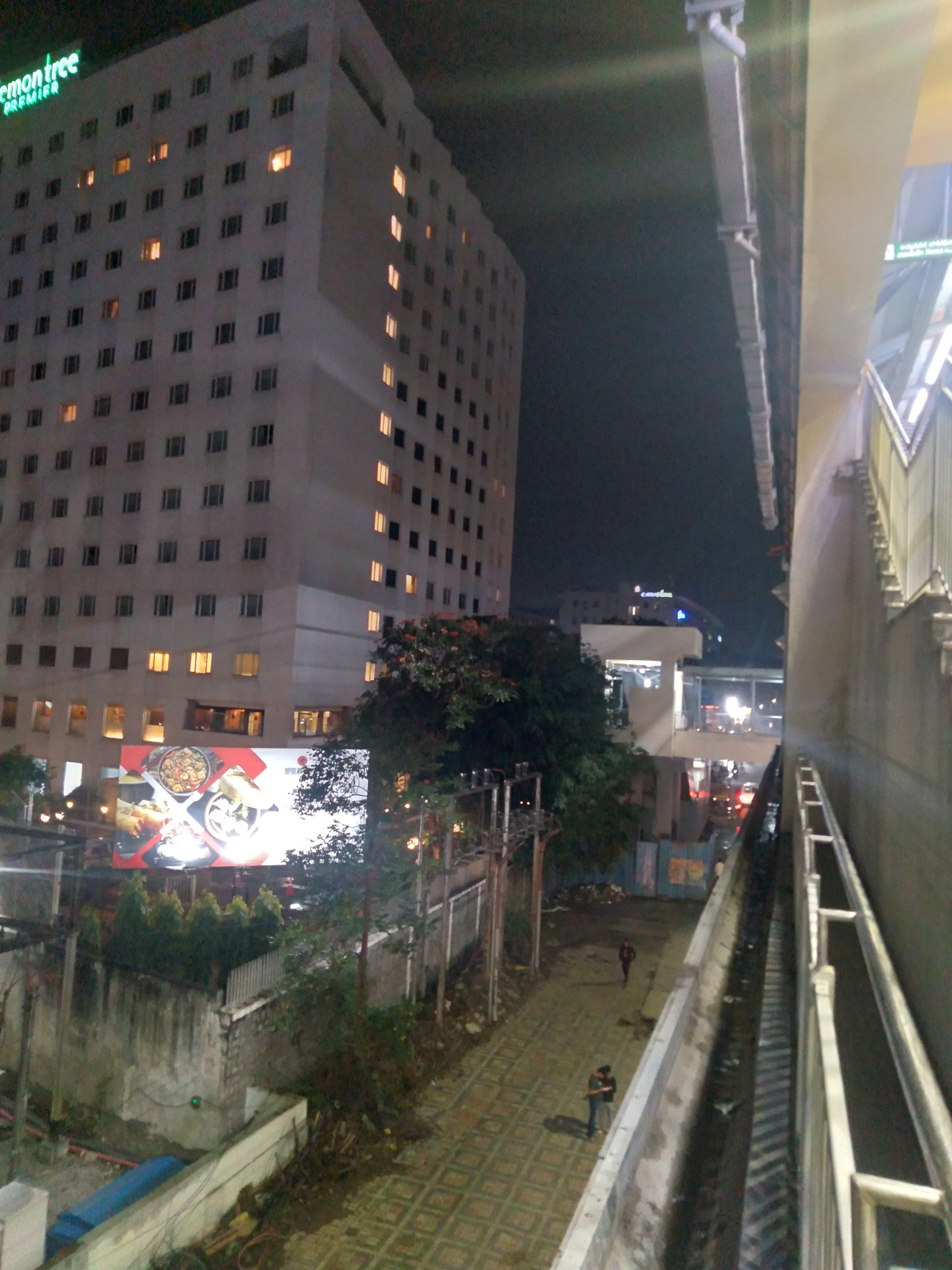
Fourth arm for entry and exit from Raidurg metro station

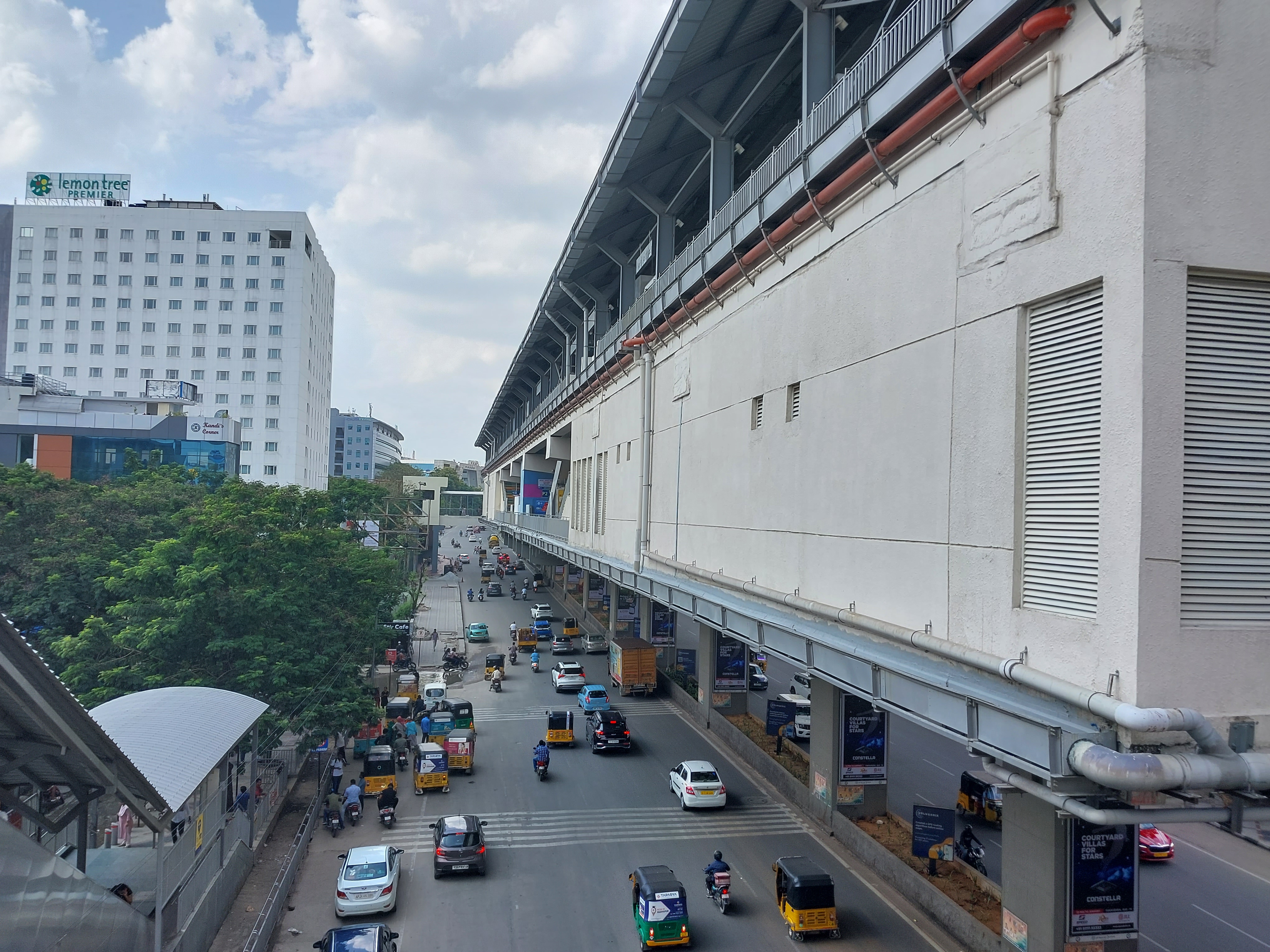

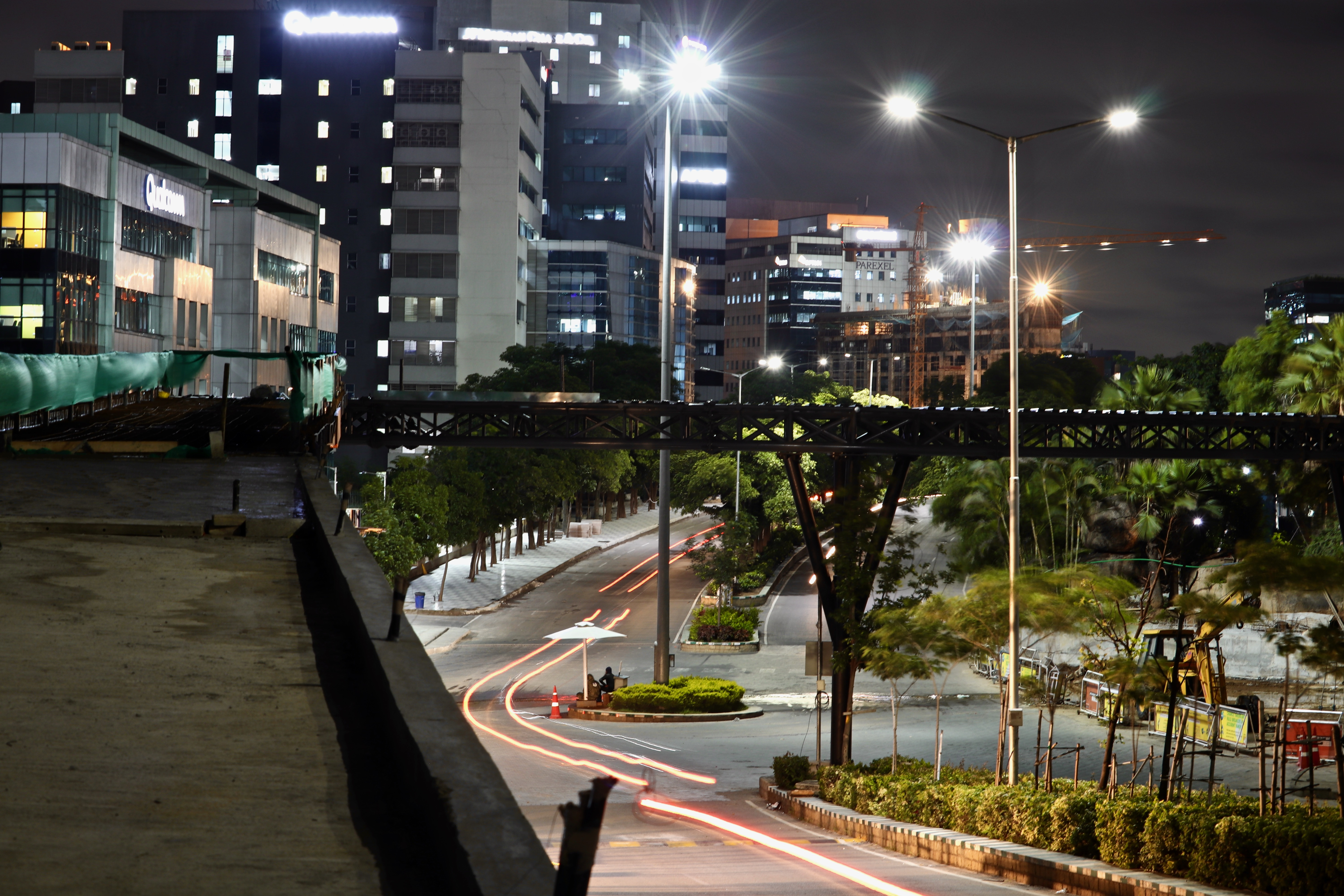
Mindspace skywalk from Raidurg metro station

== In popular culture ==
- Some scenes of 2021 Telugu film- Ek Mini Katha starring Santosh Shoban and Kavya Thapar were shot at Raidurg metro station.
- In June 2022, a scene from upcoming Indian science fiction film Kalki 2898 AD starring Amitabh Bachchan was shot at Raidurg metro station.

== See also ==
- New Delhi metro station
- Delhi Aerocity metro station
