= Nagole metro station =

Metro station in Hyderabad, India

Nagole

General information
- Location: Inner Ring Rd, Opp. Uppal Rto Office, Uppal Main Road Hyderabad, Telangana 500039.
- Coordinates: 17.3908477°N 78.5587195°E
- System: Hyderabad Metro station
- Line: Blue Line
- Tracks: 2

Construction
- Structure type: Elevated
- Depth: 7.07 m (23.2 ft)
- Platform levels: 2

History
- Opened: 29 November 2017; 8 years ago

Services
| Preceding station | Hyderabad Metro | Following station |
|---|---|---|
| Uppal towards Raidurg | Blue Line | Terminus |
Location
- Location within Hyderabad Location within Telangana Location within India

Nagole metro station is located on the Blue Line of the Hyderabad Metro in India, in the state of Telangana. It is near to HMR Uppal Depot, Metro Cash and Carry, RTA, HDFC bank ATM, ICICI Bank ATM and JayaChandra Gardens. Five shuttle bus services from Nagole Metro Station will carry tourists to Ramoji Film City every day. Passengers can visit all miles app or Nagole station for more details.

== History ==
It was opened on 29 November 2017.

== The station ==
=== Structure ===
Nagole elevated metro station is situated on the Blue Line of Hyderabad Metro.

=== Station layout ===
Street Level
This is the first level where passengers may park their vehicles and view the local area map.

Concourse level
Ticketing office or Ticket Vending Machines (TVMs) is located here. Retail outlets and other facilities like washrooms, ATMs, first aid, etc., will be available in this area.

Platform level
This layer consists of two platforms. Trains takes passengers from this level.

| G | Street level | Exit/Entrance |
| L1 | Mezzanine | Fare control, station agent, Metro Card vending machines, crossover |
| L2 | Side platform No- 1, doors will open on the left |
| L2 | Southbound | Towards →Raidurg→ → |
| L2 | Northbound | →Towards ← stop← ← |
| L2 | Side platform No- 2, doors will open on the left |
| L2 |

== Entry/exit ==
Nagole station Entry/exits
| Gate No-A | Gate No-B | Gate No-C | Gate No-D |

== See also ==
- Hyderabad
- Transport in Hyderabad
- List of rapid transit systems
- List of metro systems
