= 2020 Greater Hyderabad Municipal Corporation election =

Indian municipal election

- 1 December 2020

All 150 elected seats in the Greater Hyderabad Municipal Corporation 76 seats needed for a majority
- Turnout: 46.6% (▲0.89)
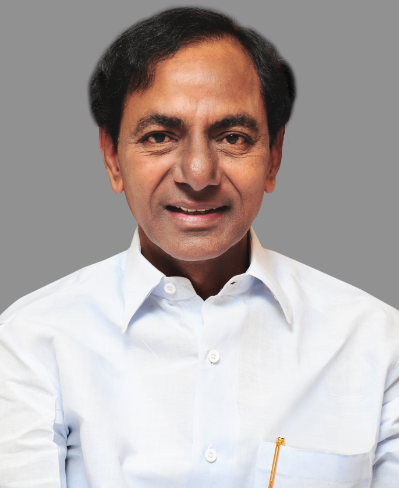

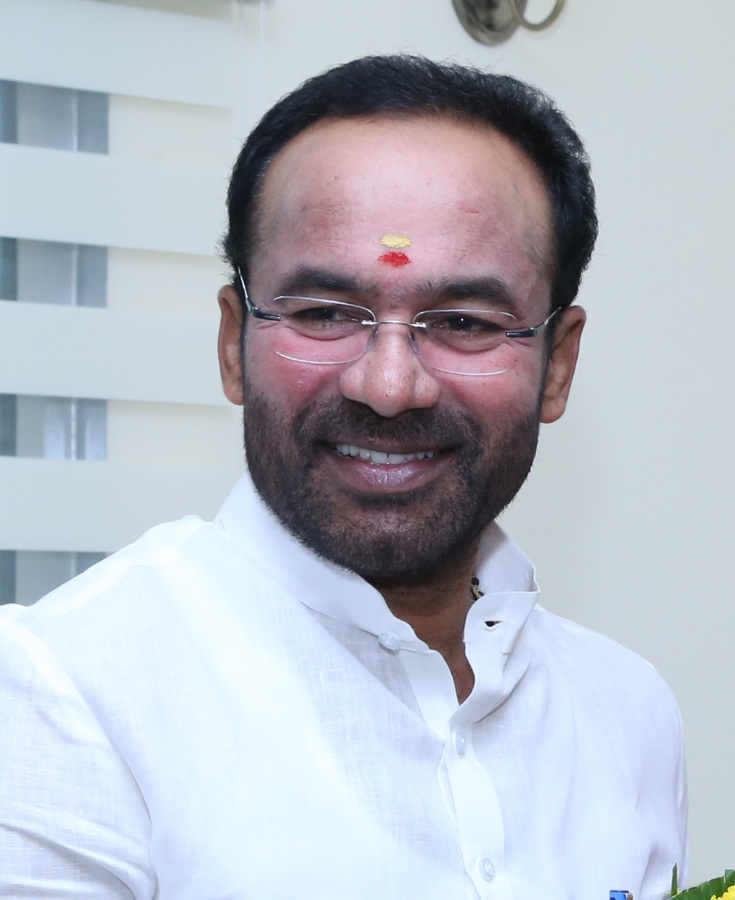

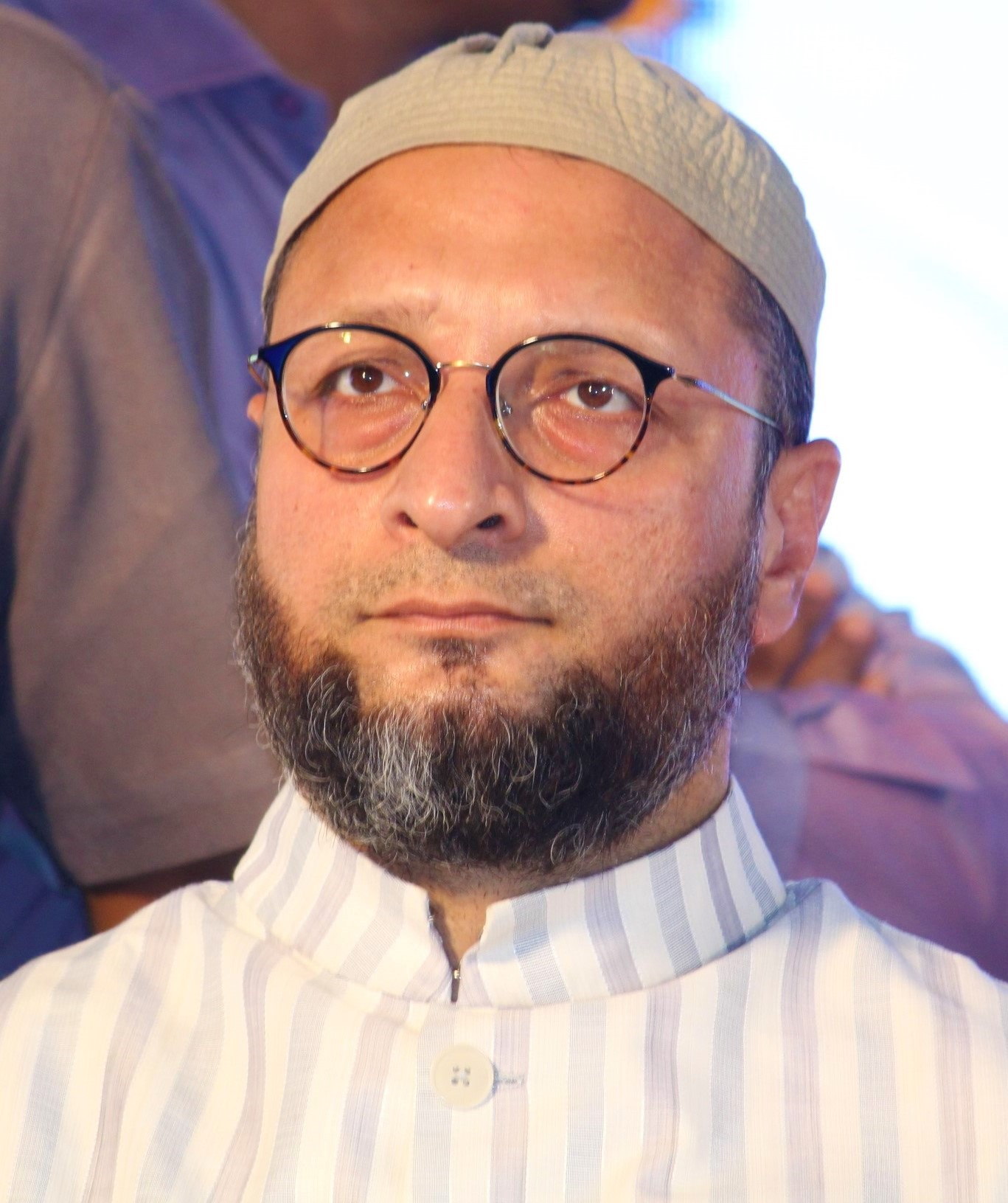

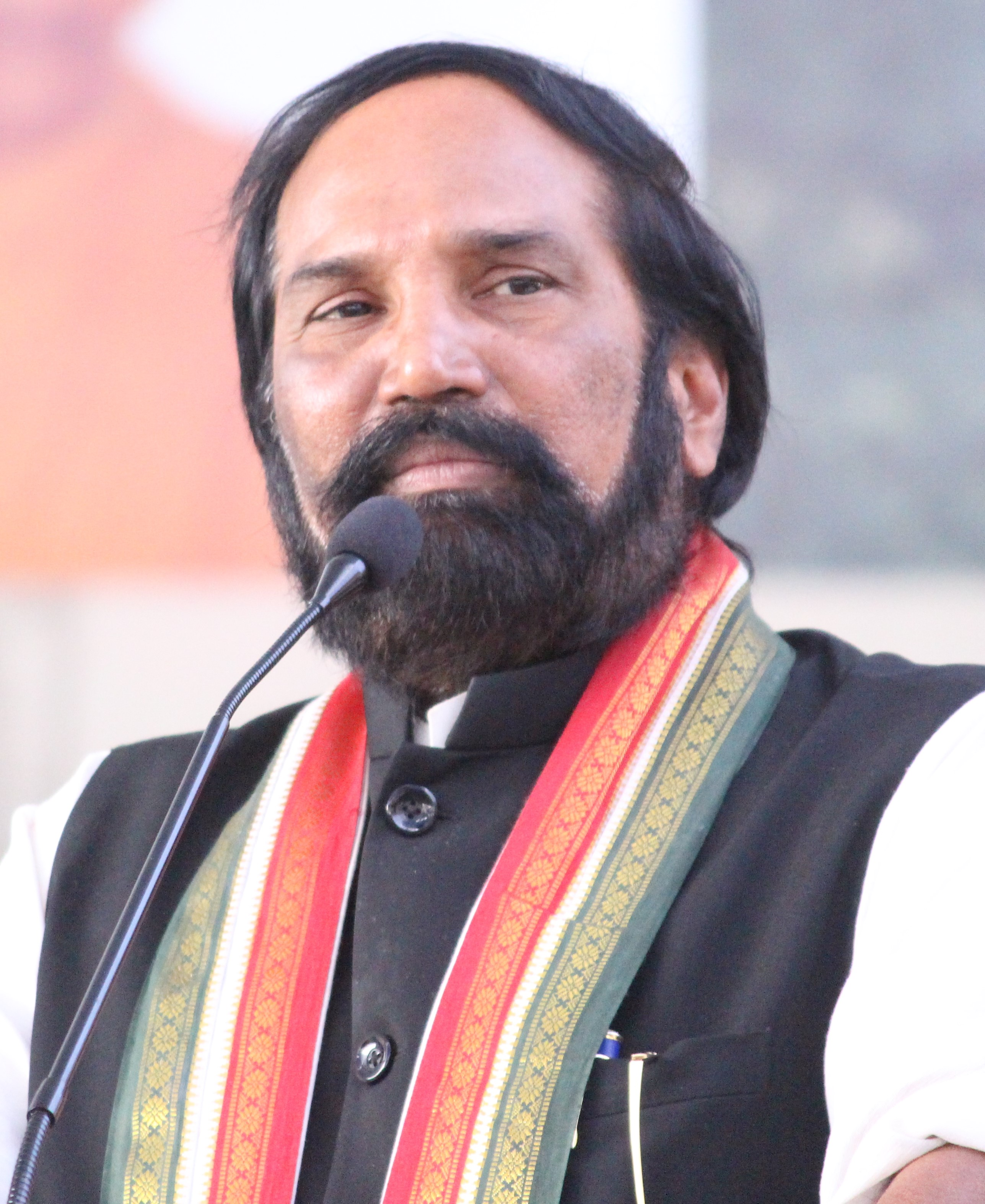

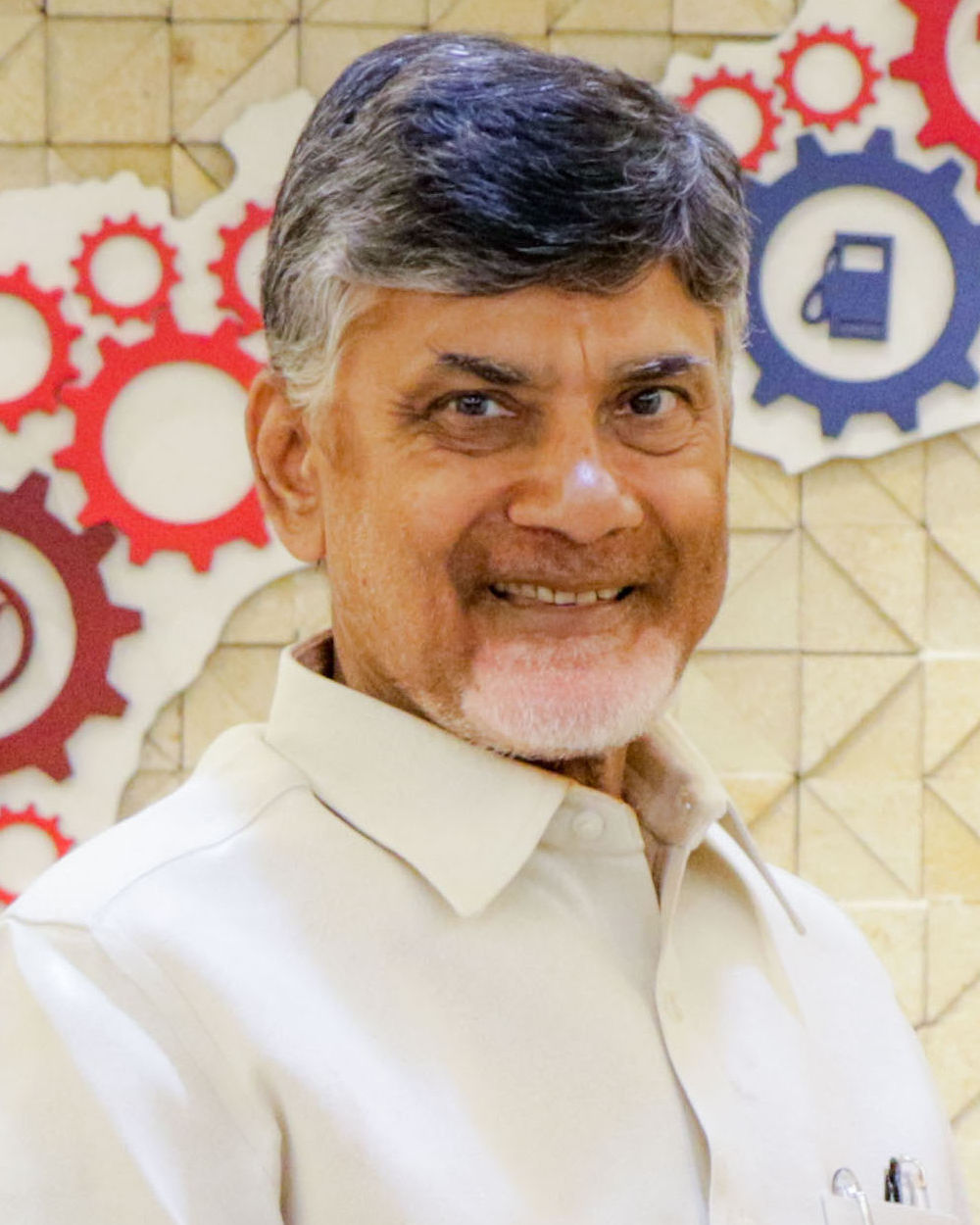
	First party	Second party	Third party
Leader	Kalvakuntla Chandrashekar Rao	G. Kishan Reddy	Asaduddin Owaisi
Party	TRS	BJP	AIMIM
Last election	99	4	44
Seats won	56	48	44
Seat change	▼43	▲44	Steady
Popular vote	1,204,167	1,195,711	630,866
Percentage	35.81%	35.56%	18.76%
Swing	▼8.04%	▲25.22%	▲2.91%
	Fourth party	Fifth party
Leader	N. Uttam Kumar Reddy	N. Chandrababu Naidu
Party	INC	TDP
Last election	2	1
Seats won	2	0
Seat change	Steady	▼1
Popular vote	224,528	55,986
Percentage	6.68%	1.67%
Swing	▼3.79%	▼11.44%
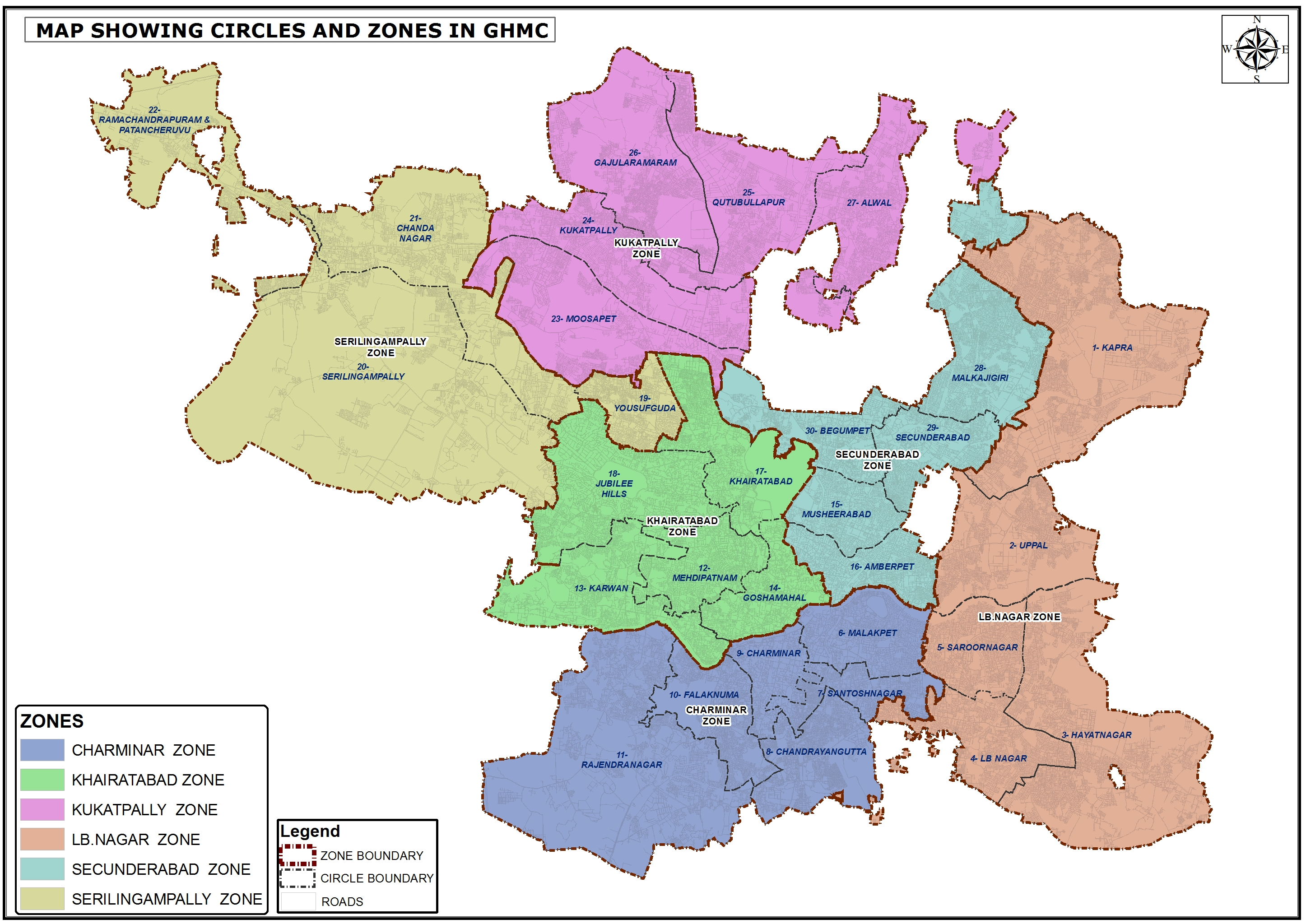

Mayor before election
Bonthu Rammohan
Telangana Rashtra Samiti
Elected Mayor
Gadwal Vijayalakshmi
Telangana Rashtra Samiti

The 2020 Greater Hyderabad Municipal Corporation election was conducted on 1 December 2020 to elect members to all 150 wards of the municipal corporation. The BJP made significant inroads into the GHMC winning 48 seats, much at the loss of the TRS which lost its majority. After the results were declared, the TRS formed the government with outside support from the AIMIM.

== Election schedule ==
Event	Date
Date for Nominations	18 November 2020
Last Date for filing Nominations	20 November 2020
Date for scrutiny of nominations	21 November 2020
Last date for withdrawal of candidatures	22 November 2020
Date of poll	1 December 2020
Date of counting	4 December 2020
Date before which the election shall be completed	6 December 2020

== Polls ==
=== Exit polls ===
Date	Polling Agency						Remarks
Date	Polling Agency	TRS	BJP+	INC+	AIMIM	Others	Remarks
2 December 2022	Patriotic Voter	65	42	1	42	0	Hung
3 December 2022	Jan Ki Baat	74	31	0	40	5	Hung

== Results By Ward ==
The results were announced on 5 December 2020, The Telangana Rashtra Samithi has won 56 wards while Bharatiya Janata Party and All India Majlis-e-Ittehadul Muslimeen have won 48 and 44 wards respectively. The winners are as follows.

Results
Ward		Winner			Runner Up			Margin
#	Name	Candidate	Party	Votes	Candidate	Party	Votes	Margin
1	Kapra	S Swarna Raj	TRS	8762	A Vinod Kumar	BJP	6684	2078
2	A. S. Rao Nagar	Singireddy Shirisha Reddy	INC	9043	Chandrika Meduri	BJP	4647	4396
3	Cherlapally	Bonthu Sridevi	TRS	11635	Surender Goud Kasula	BJP	8905	2730
4	Meerpet HB Colony	J. Prabhu Dass	TRS	11266	Bangi Jaya Lakshmi	BJP	7327	3939
5	Mallapur	Devendar Reddy Pannala	TRS	9157	Rangu Mallikarjun Goud	BJP	6465	2692
6	Nacharam	Shanthi Saizen Shekar	TRS	9549	Ampala Anitha	BJP	7495	2054
7	Chilukanagar	Bannala Geeta Praveen	TRS	10205	Gone Shailaja	BJP	9597	608
8	Habsiguda	Chethana Kakkireni	BJP	10803	Bethi Swapna Reddy	TRS	9356	1447
9	Ramanthapur	Bandaru Srivani	BJP	10033	Gandham Jyosthna	TRS	9378	655
10	Uppal	M Rajitha	INC	14504	Aratikayala Shalini	TRS	8570	5934
11	Nagole	CH Aruna	BJP	14560	Cheruku Sangeetha	TRS	11314	3246
12	Mansoorabad	Koppula Narsimha Reddy	BJP	13318	Koppula Vittal Reddy	TRS	7900	5418
13	Hayaathnagar	K.Navajeevan Reddy	BJP	14916	S.Tirumala Reddy	TRS	7777	7139
14	BN Reddy Nagar	Moddu Lachi Reddy	BJP	11438	Muddgouni Laxmi Prasanna	TRS	11406	32
15	Vanasthalipuram	Venkateshwar Reddy Ragula	BJP	9214	Jitta Rajashekar Reddy	TRS	8512	702
16	Hastinapuram	Banoth Sujatha	BJP	8036	Ramavath Padma	TRS	7757	279
17	Champapet	Vanga Madhusudhan Reddy	BJP	15164	Sama Ramana Reddy	TRS	6156	9008
18	Lingojiguda	Akula Ramesh Goud	BJP	10340	M Srinivasa Rao	TRS	7529	2811
19	Saroornagar	Akula Srivani	BJP	12085	Anitha Reddy Parupally	TRS	8767	3318
20	Ramakrishnapuram	Radha Veerannagari	BJP	13036	Vijaya Bharathi Murukuntla	TRS	9106	3930
21	Kothapet	Pavan Kumar Naikoti	BJP	11371	G.V.Sagar Reddy	TRS	6588	4783
22	Chaitanyapuri	Ranga Venkat Narsimha Rao	BJP	10500	Ginnaram Vittal Reddy	TRS	5041	5459
23	Gaddiannaram	Baddam Prem Maheswar Reddy	BJP	10712	Bhavani Praveen Kumar	TRS	6110	4602
24	Saidabad	Kothakapu Aruna	BJP	10621	Swarna Latha Singireddy	TRS	9710	911
25	Moosrambagh	B Bhagya Lakshmi	BJP	10353	Teegala Sunaritha	TRS	8234	2119
26	Old Malakpet	Juweria Fatima	AIMIM	12200	Kanakaboina Renuka	BJP	3957	8243
27	Akberbagh	Syed Minhajuddin	AIMIM	8908	Basupalli Naveen Reddy	BJP	5181	3727
28	Azampura	Ayesha Jahan Naseem	AIMIM	9868	Asma Khatoon	MBT	6010	3858
29	Chavni	Mohammaed Abdul Salam Shahid	AIMIM	14714	Md Khaja Ali Siddiqui	IND	2936	11778
30	Dabeerpura	Alamdar Hussain Khan	AIMIM	13499	Mirza Akhil Afandi	BJP	2575	10924
31	Rain Bazar	Mohammed Wasayuddin	AIMIM	12388	Mohammed Abdul Jaweed	TRS	2833	9555
32	Pathergatti	Syed Sohail Quadri	AIMIM	20717	Syed Abdul Qadeer	TRS	1808	18909
33	Moghalpura	Nasreen Sultana	AIMIM	11754	C Manjula	BJP	5782	5972
34	Talabkatta	Sameena Begum	AIMIM	18922	S Narjis Banu	TRS	1467	17455
35	Gowlipura	A Bhagya Laxmi	BJP	15469	Boddu Saritha	TRS	4610	10859
36	Lalithabagh	MD Ali Sharif	AIMIM	12110	M Chandrasekhar	BJP	3878	8232
37	Kurmaguda	Mahapara	AIMIM	13152	P Shantha	BJP	7028	6124
38	IS Sadan	J Sweetha	BJP	10924	Sama Swapna	TRS	8522	2402
39	Santoshnagar	Mohammed Muzaffar Hussain	AIMIM	17368	C.Srinivas	TRS	1524	15844
40	Riyasath Nagar	Mirza Mustafa Baig	AIMIM	17368	Kolla Mahender	BJP	1202	16166
41	Kanchanbagh	Reshma Fatima	AIMIM	17709	Vasantha Akula	TRS	1267	16442
42	Barkas	Shabana Begum	AIMIM	13558	Chenniahgari Saritha	TRS	1891	11667
43	Chandrayangutta	Abdul Wahab	AIMIM	19152	J. Naveen Kumar	BJP	2419	16733
44	Uppuguda	Fahad Bin Abdul Samed Bin Abdat	AIMIM	13408	Thadem Srinivas Rao	BJP	5402	8006
45	Jangammet	Mohammed Abdur Rahman	AIMIM	10629	Kowdi Mahender	BJP	9046	1583
46	Falaknuma	K.Thara Bai	AIMIM	19434	Nenawath Bikku Naik	TRS	2150	17284
47	Nawab Saheb Kunta	Shireen Khatoon	AIMIM	17543	Sameena Beguma	TRS	1923	15620
48	Shali Banda	Mohd Mustafa Ali	AIMIM	15820	Y Naresh	BJP	5626	10194
49	Ghansi Bazar	Parveen Sultana	AIMIM	14377	Renu Soni	BJP	8909	5468
50	Begum Bazaar	G Shakar Yadav	BJP	16186	Pooja Vyas	TRS	7134	9052
51	Goshamahal	Lal Singh	BJP	12499	G Mukesh Singh	TRS	5130	7369
52	Puranapool	S Raj Mohan	AIMIM	10779	K Surender	BJP	5874	4905
53	Doodbowli	MD Saleem	AIMIM	12230	Akuthota Niranjan Kumar	BJP	4034	8196
54	Jahanuma	Mohammed Abdul Muqtader	AIMIM	18624	Palle Veeramani	TRS	1757	16867
55	Ramanastpura	MD Khader	AIMIM	15781	MD Inkeshaf	TRS	1668	14113
56	Kishanbagh	Khawaja Mubasheeruddin	AIMIM	14834	Mohammed Shakeel Ahmed	TRS	3252	11582
57	Suleman Nagar	Abida Sultana	AIMIM	16723	Saritha Airva	TRS	3751	12972
58	Shastripuram	Mohammed Mubeen	AIMIM	13676	Banda Rajesh Yadav	TRS	3057	10619
59	Mylardevpally	Thokala Srinivas Reddy	BJP	18076	T Premdas Goud	TRS	16128	4948
60	Rajendra Nagar	Podavu Archana	BJP	10844	Korani Srilatha	TRS	8438	2406
61	Attapur	Sangeeta Mondra	BJP	13479	Cheruku Madhavi	TRS	11395	2084
62	Ziaguda	Darshan Bohini	BJP	12711	A Krishna	TRS	6820	5891
63	Manghalhat	Merampally Shashikala	BJP	11756	Paramesawari Singh	TRS	10947	809
64	Dattathreyanagar	Mohmmad Zaker Baquery	AIMIM	12314	N Dharmender Singh	BJP	1940	10374
65	Karwan	Mandagiri Swamy	AIMIM	10546	Katla Ashok	BJP	9427	1119
66	Lunger House	Amina Begum	AIMIM	11182	C.Sugandha Pushpa	BJP	7564	3618
67	Golkonda	Sameena Yasmeen	AIMIM	20819	Asfiya Khan	TRS	3569	17250
68	Tolichowki	Ayesha Humera	AIMIM	18089	Naga Jyothi Abbanapuri	TRS	1572	16517
69	Nanalnagar	Mohammed Naseeruddin	AIMIM	21818	Shaik Azhar	TRS	2954	18864
70	Mehdipatnam	Mohammed Majid Hussain	AIMIM	21818	D Gopala Krishna	BJP	1936	19882
71	Gudimalkapur	Devara Karunakar	BJP	12359	Bangari Prakash	TRS	8693	3666
72	Asif Nagar	Ghousia Sultana	AIMIM	12309	Chennabatni Lavanya	BJP	6215	6094
73	Vijayanagar Colony	Batha Jabeen	AIMIM	11071	Darga Ashwini	BJP	4964	6107
74	Ahmed Nagar	Rafath Sultana	AIMIM	14536	Mamatha S	TRS	3164	11372
75	Red Hills	Saddia Mazher	AIMIM	10460	Seema	BJP	3920	6540
76	Mallepally	Yasmeen Begum	AIMIM	12386	Kolluru Ushasree	BJP	9301	3085
77	Jambagh	Rakesh Jaiswal	BJP	8547	Jadala Ravindra	AIMIM	8365	182
78	Gunfoundry	B. Surekha	BJP	11696	Mamtha Manga	TRS	8819	2877
79	Himayathnagar	G.N.V.K. Mahalakshmi	BJP	12134	J. Hemalatha Yadav	TRS	9158	2976
80	Kachiguda	K Uma Rani	BJP	13579	B Sirisha	TRS	5590	7989
81	Nallakunta	Amrutha Yakara	BJP	12779	Gariganti Sridevi	TRS	9523	3256
82	Golnaka	Lavanya Dusari	TRS	13381	Kattula Saritha	BJP	10665	2716
83	Amberpet	E Vijay Kumar Goud	TRS	14800	A Yeshwanth	BJP	10617	4183
84	Bagh Amberpet	B Padma Venkat Reddy	BJP	12836	Kuchalakanti Padmavathi	TRS	9037	3799
85	Adikmet	C Sunitha Prakash Goud	BJP	7830	B Hemalatha	TRS	7603	227
86	Musheerabad	M Supriya	BJP	12551	Edla Bhagyalakshmi	TRS	9811	2740
87	Ramnagar	K Ravi Kumar	BJP	9819	V Srinivas Reddy	TRS	9291	528
88	Bholakpur	Ghouse Uddin Mohd	AIMIM	9048	Bingi Naveen Kumar	TRS	6437	2611
89	Gandhinagar	Aenugula Pavani	BJP	9731	Muta Padma Naresh	TRS	7155	2576
90	Kavadiguda	Rachana Sri Godchala	BJP	11562	Lasya Nanditha G	TRS	10085	1477
91	Khairtabad	P Vijaya Reddy	TRS	12577	S Veena Madhuri	BJP	10037	2540
92	Venkateshwara Colony	Manne Kavitha Reddy	TRS	12966	B Uma	BJP	5814	7152
93	Banjara Hills	Vijaya Laxmi R Gadwal	TRS	10227	Baddam Mahipal Reddy	BJP	9446	781
94	Shaikhpet	Mohammed Rashed Faraz Uddin	AIMIM	13412	Cherka Mahesh	BJP	9045	4367
95	Jubilee Hills	Venkatesh Derangula	BJP	10406	Kaja Suryanarayana	TRS	9627	779
96	Yousufguda	Bandari Raj Kumar	TRS	9835	K Ganaga Raju	BJP	7513	2322
97	Somajiguda	Vanam Sangeetha	TRS	11516	G Vijaya Durga Gunti	BJP	7679	3837
98	Ameerpet	Ketineni Sarala	BJP	8947	N Seshu Kumari	TRS	7646	1301
99	Vengal Rao Nagar	G. Dedeepya	TRS	9211	Kilari Manohar	BJP	8065	1146
100	Sanathnagar	Kolanu Laxmi	TRS	11665	K Annapurna	BJP	9236	2429
101	Erragadda	Shaheen Begum	AIMIM	8971	K Pallavi	TRS	7737	1234
102	Rahmath Nagar	C.N. Reddy	TRS	14972	Kolan Venkatesh	BJP	5276	9696
103	Borabanda	MD Baba Fasiuddin	TRS	14326	Mandhuvada Srinivas Goud	BJP	5162	9164
104	Kondapur	Shaik Hameed	TRS	14758	M Raghunath	BJP	10772	3986
105	Gachibowli	V.Gangadhar Reddy	BJP	10602	K.Sai Baba	TRS	9467	1135
106	Serilingampally	Ragam Nagender Yadav	TRS	12911	K.Yellesh	BJP	11468	1443
107	Madhapur	V. Jagadeeshwar Goud	TRS	13672	Gangala Radhakrishna Yadav	BJP	6767	6905
108	Miyapur	Uppalapati Sreekanth	TRS	9735	K Raghavender Rao	BJP	7534	2201
109	Hafeezpet	V Pujitha	TRS	15039	Boini Anusha Yadav	BJP	9850	5189
110	Chanda Nagar	R Manjula	TRS	11975	Kasireddy Sindhu Reddy	BJP	8704	3271
111	Bharathi Nagar	V Sindhu	TRS	11563	Godhavari Chinnamile	BJP	6905	4658
112	Ramachandrapuram	Burugadda Pushpa	TRS	11540	Nallagandla Narsing Goud	BJP	5781	5759
113	Patancheru	Mettu Kumar Yadav	TRS	15523	Ashish Goud Thouti	BJP	9440	6083
114	KPHB Colony	Mandadi Srinivasa Rao	TRS	12498	Sarivigari Preetham Kumar Reddy	BJP	10093	2405
115	Balaji Nagar	P Sirisha	TRS	12701	A Charumathi Devi	BJP	9880	2821
116	Allapur	Sabiha Begum	TRS	18648	Puligolla Srilakshmi	BJP	8338	10310
117	Moosapet	K Mahendar	BJP	10068	Thumu Sravan Kumar	TRS	9530	538
118	Fathe Nagar	Satish Babu Pandala	TRS	11626	M Krishna Goud	BJP	9131	2495
119	Old Bowenpally	M Narsimha Yadav	TRS	16031	Yengula Thirupathi	BJP	8560	7471
120	Bala Nagar	Avula Ravindar Reddy	TRS	10945	Yasa Narsi Reddy	BJP	7214	3731
121	Kukatpally	Jupally Satyanarayana Rao	TRS	10679	Pavan Kumar Naineni	BJP	9930	749
122	V V nagar Colony	Madhavaram Roja Devi	TRS	11658	U Vidhya Kalpana	BJP	7539	4119
123	Hyder Nagar	Narne Srinivasa Rao	TRS	9260	Velaga Srinivas	BJP	7227	2033
124	Allwyn Colony	Dodla Venkatesh Goud	TRS	11079	Surabhi Ravinder Rao	BJP	9835	1244
125	Gajula Ramaram	Ravula Seshagiri	TRS	13267	Kuna Srinivas Goud	INC	12830	437
126	Jagadgirigutta	Kolukula Jagan	TRS	10382	Mahesh Yadav Jella	BJP	9904	478
127	Rangareddy Nagar	B Vijay Shekhar	TRS	13516	Nandanam Divakar	BJP	5555	7961
128	Chintal	Rashida Begum	TRS	8477	Kotte Radhika	BJP	6554	1923
129	Suraram	Manthri Sathya Narayana	TRS	11115	Bakka Shanker Reddy	BJP	7624	3491
130	Subhash Nagar	Hemalatha Gudimetla	TRS	19545	Somannagari Malathi	BJP	8826	10719
131	Quthbullapur	Kuna Gourish Parijatha	TRS	12220	Gaddam Swathika Reddy	BJP	10187	2033
132	Jeedimetla	Cherukupally Tara Chandra Reddy	BJP	14004	K Padma	TRS	9198	4806
133	Macha Bollaram	E.S.Raj Jitendernath	TRS	12089	Sarvey Naresh	BJP	12055	34
134	Alwal	Chintala Vijay Shanti	TRS	10998	Kandhikanti Veena	BJP	8941	2057
135	Venkatapuram	Sabitha Kishore	TRS	7580	Gaddi Shivabhishek	BJP	6415	1165
136	Neredmet	Kothapally Meena Reddy	TRS	10330	V Prasanna Naidu	BJP	9662	668
137	Vinayak Nagar	Cyanam Rajyalakshmi	BJP	9972	Baddam Puspalatha	TRS	9685	287
138	Moula Ali	Gunnala Sunitha	BJP	10491	Mumtaz Fathima	TRS	10240	251
139	East Anandbagh	Y Prem Kumar	TRS	10163	Nagaraj Bakka	BJP	7567	2596
140	Malkajgiri	Sravan Vurapalli	BJP	8366	N Jagadishwar Goud	TRS	8188	178
141	Gotham Nagar	Mekala Suneetha	TRS	10304	S Santoshi	BJP	8004	2300
142	Addagutta	Lingani Prasnna Lakshmi	TRS	13532	Kadari Ashwini	BJP	6669	6863
143	Tarnaka	Mothe Sri Latha	TRS	14069	Banda Jaya Sudha Reddy	BJP	11565	2504
144	Mettuguda	R Sunitha	TRS	7592	U Sharada Mallesh	BJP	7008	584
145	Sitaphalmandi	Samala Hema	TRS	14035	K Deepthi	BJP	12834	1201
146	Boudha Nagar	Kandi Shailaja	TRS	9997	Keerthi Mekala	BJP	9185	812
147	Bansilalpet	Kurma Hemalatha	TRS	13930	Ghandhamala Spandana	BJP	13094	836
148	Ramgopalpet	Cheera Suchitra	BJP	8453	A Aruna	TRS	8143	310
149	Begumpet	T Maheshwari	TRS	11407	R Rajalakshmi	BJP	10053	1354
150	Monda Market	Kontham Deepika	BJP	12015	Akula Rupha	TRS	8068	3947
