= Aghapura =

- Suburb
- Location in Telangana, India
- Coordinates: 17.3882°N 78.4645°E
- Country: India
- State: Telangana
- District: Hyderabad District

Government
  - Body: GHMC

Languages
  - Official: Deccani Urdu, Telugu
- Time zone: UTC+5:30 (IST)
- PIN: 500457 (GPO)
- Lok Sabha constituency: Secunderabad
- Planning agency: GHMC

Aghapura is a neighbourhood in Hyderabad, India. Located between the major suburbs of Hyderabad, Nampally and Mehdipatnam. The area is famous for Aghapura Charkhandil - four lamps which used to exist which would be lit at night. A designated person would light the lamps every day during the evening. Hence this particular spot is still referred to its old name and is a landmark. Aghapura is named after Agha Muhammad Dawood Abul Ulai, a disciple of Sufi saint Shah Mohammed Hassan Abul Ulai. The shrine, also known as Aghapura Dargah, was awarded during world Heritage day.

== Transport ==
Aghapura is connected by buses run by TSRTC.

The closest MMTS train station is at Nampally is about 1 km away.

== Business ==
Aghapura is the center of attention during the Urs (celebration) of the Aghapura Dargah. This locality is also in highlight for a political reason as the All India Majlis-e-Ittehadul Muslimeen (AIMIM) party's headquarters located at Darussalam.

== Neighbourhoods ==
- Bazar Ghat
- Dhool Pet
- Gosha Mahal
- JiyaGuda
- Karwan
- Asifnagar
- Mangalhat
- Mehdipatnam
- Masab Tank
- Murad Nagar
- Nampally
- Seetaram Bagh
- Shantinagar
