= Nampally Assembly constituency =

Constituency of the Telangana legislative assembly in India

Coordinates: 17.38°N 78.47°E

Nampally
- Constituency No. 63 for the Telangana Legislative Assembly
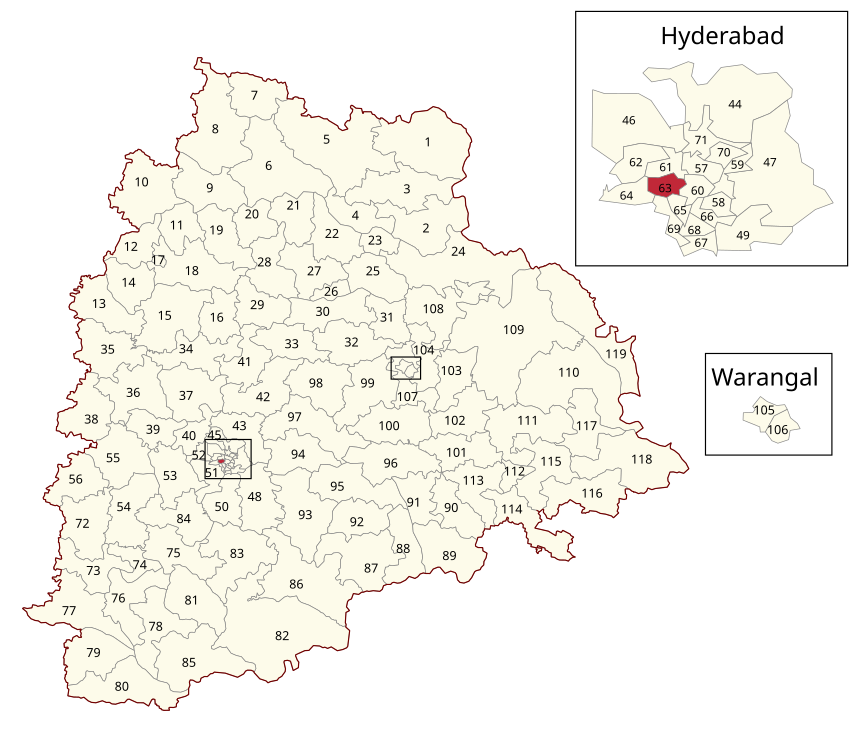
- Location of Nampally Assembly constituency within Telangana

Constituency details
- Country: India
- Region: South India
- State: Telangana
- District: Hyderabad
- Lok Sabha constituency: Secunderabad
- Established: 2008 (as Nampally)
- Total electors: 3,09,362
- Reservation: None

Member of Legislative Assembly
- 3rd Telangana Legislative Assembly
- Incumbent Majid Hussain
- Party: AIMIM
- Elected year: 2023 (3 years ago)
- Preceded by: Jaffer Hussain Meraj

Nampally Assembly constituency is a constituency of Telangana Legislative Assembly, India. It is one of the 26 constituencies of CURE limits, a strategic zone created by Government of Telangana. It is part of Secunderabad Lok Sabha constituency.

Majid Hussain of All India Majlis-e-Ittehadul Muslimeen is representing the constituency after the 2023 Telangana elections which he subsequently won by narrowly defeating Congress candidate Mohammed Feroz Khan and replaced incumbent Jaffer Hussain who instead became MLA of Yakhutpura constituency.

== Extent of the constituency ==
Nampally was carved out of Asifnagar Assembly constituency before the 2009 elections as per Delimitation Act of 2002. The constituency presently comprises the following neighbourhoods:

Neighbourhood
Nampally
Masab Tank
Asif Nagar
Mehdipatnam
Saifabad
Mallepally
Chintal Basti (part)
Gudimalkapur (part)

== Members of Legislative Assembly Shalibanda ==
Duration	Member	Political party
Hyderabad State
1952-57	Massoma Begum	Indian National Congress

== Members of Legislative Assembly Nampally ==
Year	Member	Political party
Andhra Pradesh
2009	Mohd. Virasat Rasool Khan	All India Majlis-e-Ittehadul Muslimeen
Telangana
2014	Jaffer Hussain Meraj	All India Majlis-e-Ittehadul Muslimeen
2018	Jaffer Hussain Meraj	All India Majlis-e-Ittehadul Muslimeen
2023	Majid Hussain	All India Majlis-e-Ittehadul Muslimeen

== Election results ==
=== 2023 ===
2023 Telangana Legislative Assembly election: Nampally
Party	Candidate	Votes	%	±%
AIMIM	Mohammad Majid Hussain	62,185	40.96	▼1.3
INC	Mohammad Feroz Khan	60,148	39.61	▲4.6
TRS	Anand Kumar Goud	15,420	10.15	▼2.1
BJP	Rahul Chandra	11,216	7.38	▼1.4
NOTA	None of the Above	544	0.3	▼0.2
Majority		2,037	1.35	
Turnout		1,51,815		
AIMIM hold		Swing		

=== 2018 ===
2018 Telangana Legislative Assembly election: Nampally
Party	Candidate	Votes	%	±%
AIMIM	Jaffer Hussain	57,940	41.99	▼5.3
INC	Mohammad Feroz Khan	48,265	34.98	▲28.6
TRS	Ch.Anand Kumar Goud	17,015	12.33	▲7.7
BJP	Devara Karunakar kuruma	11,622	8.42	▲8.5
NOTA	None of the Above	793	0.57	
Majority		9,675		
Turnout		1,37,972	45.46	
AIMIM hold		Swing		

=== Telangana Legislative Assembly election, 2014 ===
Telangana Assembly Elections, 2014: Nampally (Assembly constituency)
Party	Candidate	Votes	%	±%
AIMIM	Jaffer Hussain	63,652	47.5	
TDP	Mohammad Feroz Khan	46,356	34.6	
INC	E. Vinod Kumar Mudiraj	8,818	6.6	
TRS	K. Hanmantha Rao	6,327	4.7	▲4.7
Majority		17,296		
Turnout				
AIMIM hold		Swing	▲2.97	

=== Andhra Pradesh Legislative Assembly election, 2009 ===
Andhra Pradesh Assembly Elections, 2009: Nampally (Assembly constituency)
Party	Candidate	Votes	%	±%
AIMIM	Mohd. Virasat Rasool Khan	34,439	31.07%	
PRP	Mohammad Feroz Khan	27,640	24.94%	
INC	E. Vinod Kumar Mudiraj	22,520	20.32%	
Majority		6,799		
AIMIM hold		Swing	{{{swing}}}	

== See also ==
- Nampally
- List of constituencies of Telangana Legislative Assembly
