= Asif Nagar =

- Mandal
- Location in Telangana, India Asif Nagar (Telangana) Asif Nagar (India)
- Coordinates: 17.3894°N 78.4527°E
- Country: India
- State: Telangana
- District: Hyderabad District

Government
  - Body: GHMC

Languages
  - Official: Deccani Urdu, Telugu
- Time zone: UTC+5:30 (IST)
- PIN: 500028 (Humayun Nagar PO)
- Lok Sabha constituency: Hyderabad
- Vidhan Sabha constituency: Nampally
- Planning agency: GHMC

Asif Nagar is a major neighbourhood in the western part of Hyderabad, India. It is located north of the Musi River near Mehdipatnam. It is a mandal in the Hyderabad District and one of the oldest neighbourhoods that have existed for a long while.

This used to be a legislative assembly seat part of the Lok Sabha but was delimited and now it comes under the Nampally seat. ACP Office for West Zone for Hyderabad Police is situated here.

== Etymology ==
The name "Asaf" is derived from the Asaf Jahi Dynasty the Nizam of Hyderabad. Nagar is the Urdu, Hindi and Dakahini word for town or colony.

== Legislature ==
In the Lok Sabha: Asif Nagar belongs to the Hyderabad. In the Telangana Legislative Assembly: Asif Nagar belongs to the Nampally constituency represented by Mohammed Majid Hussain of the AIMIM party.

In the GHMC Ghousia Sultana of AIMIM is the corporator

Asif Nagar used to be a legislative assembly seat represented in the Lok Sabha; the lower house of the Indian parliament. but was delimited under the provisions of Delimitation Act, 2002 by the Delimitation Commission of India based on the 2001 census.

== Commercial Areas ==
=== Furniture ===
Asif Nagar is famous for wood work and carving handiwork. The furniture prepared here is exported to across the globe. All types of Furniture will be there

=== Food ===
Asif Nagar is known for its Naan bread. Famous naan shops like Madina Naan Centre have existed for more than half a century.

=== Schools ===
The schools of this locality include:

- H.V.B.H.S
- Happy Scholar School (Nursery)
- Ravindra Bharathi school
- Gowtam Model School
- Narayana College IT Academy
- Sri Chaintanya Jr College
- G. Pulla Reddy College
- Azra Public School

Himalaya Book World also has a branch here (opposite to Azra Public School)

=== Entertainment ===
This area is mostly residential but Talkies like Amba Theatre and Milan Cinema Hall are present for families to enjoy their free time.

== Places of Worship ==
=== Qutub Shahi Masjid (Choti Masjid) ===
Located at Arab Lane, Murad Nagar it is also called Choti Masjid. It holds the annual Eid prayer.

== Transportation ==
The closest MMTS station is 2 km away, at Nampally. Imliban Bus Stand and Jubilee Bus Stand are 4 and 9 km away respectively. The Secunderabad Railway Station is at a distance of 8 km, while the Rajiv Gandhi International Airport is 25 km away. Bring close to the center of Hyderabad, it is easy to travel around the city quickly from here.

== Neighbourhoods ==
- Aghapura
- Bazar Ghat
- Dhool Pet
- Gosha Mahal
- Gudi Malkapur
- Humayun Nagar
- Jhirra
- JiyaGuda
- Karwan
- Mallepally
- Mangalhat
- Mehdipatnam
- Masab Tank
- Murad Nagar
- Nampally
- Seetaram Bagh
- Shantinagar
- Tallagadda
- Vijaya Nagar Colony
