= Mallepally =

- Suburb
- Location in Telangana, India Mallepally (Telangana) Mallepally (India)
- Coordinates: 17.3893°N 78.4589°E
- Country: India
- State: Telangana
- District: Hyderabad District

Government
  - Body: GHMC

Languages
  - Official: Deccani Urdu, Telugu
- Time zone: UTC+5:30 (IST)
- PIN: 500001 (Mallepally PO)
- Lok Sabha constituency: Secunderabad
- Planning agency: GHMC

Mallepally is located near Asifnagar in Hyderabad, India. It is a locality in Hyderabad District and one of the old suburbs that have existed for a long while now. It is one of the oldest localities to exist in the history of Hyderabad during the time of Nizams.

The major colonies are Vijayanagar Colony, Aghapura Colony, Bazargaat Colony and Sitarambagh. Major landmarks are Badi Masjid popularly known as Tabligi Jamat Mosque (Nizam's era), Glory Cinema Talkies (1935; earlier known as Zia and Sham Talkies), SBH Branch (1973) and Housing Board Colony (1956).

== History ==
Mallepally was built by the fifth Asafjahi ruler – Afzal Ud Daula - next to the Afzal Sagar tank which was one of the largest tanks. Afzal Sagar tank, which was built by Afzal Ud Daula, has since disappeared and a residential colony known as Afzal Nagar has come up in its place. Many people from Mallepally emigrated from India to the western countries and the gulf. People who returned from the gulf countries brought back their cuisine with them and started hotel businesses serving Shawarma, Mandi and a lot of Arabian dishes in the area. Hence Mallepally became one of the major food hubs in Hyderabad. In the early 19th century, Malay people used to stay at this place and that's how the area got its name.

In the early 20th century, Hyderabad faced much flooding by the Musi River and subsequently led to a plague which reduced the population. Nizam Osman Ali Khan Asaf Jah VII, who had just come to occupy the throne, conferred with his ministers and city planners to come up with comprehensive plans to improve sanitation and hygiene of the city.

== Transport ==
Mallepally is connected by buses run by TSRTC.

The closest MMTS train station is at Nampally is about 2 km away.

== Business ==
Many residents from Mallepally worked in the Persian Gulf area and returned with their earnings. This phenomenon has brought a variety of cultures to the neighborhood. Many food centers around the market serving Arabian delicacies. This place is mostly known for its shawarma centers.

== Entertainment ==
This area is residential but it does has Priya cinema hall for families to enjoy their free time.

== Notable people ==
- Riaz Ahmed
- Shabana Azmi
- Fani Badayuni
- Jeelani Bano
- Abdul Basith
- Shaukat Kaifi

== Neighbourhoods ==
- Aghapura
- Asif Nagar
- Dhoolpet
- Goshamahal
- Karwan
- Masab Tank
- Mehdipatnam
- Muradnagar
- Nampally
