= Mohammad Majid Hussain =

Mayor of Hyderabad (2012 -2015)

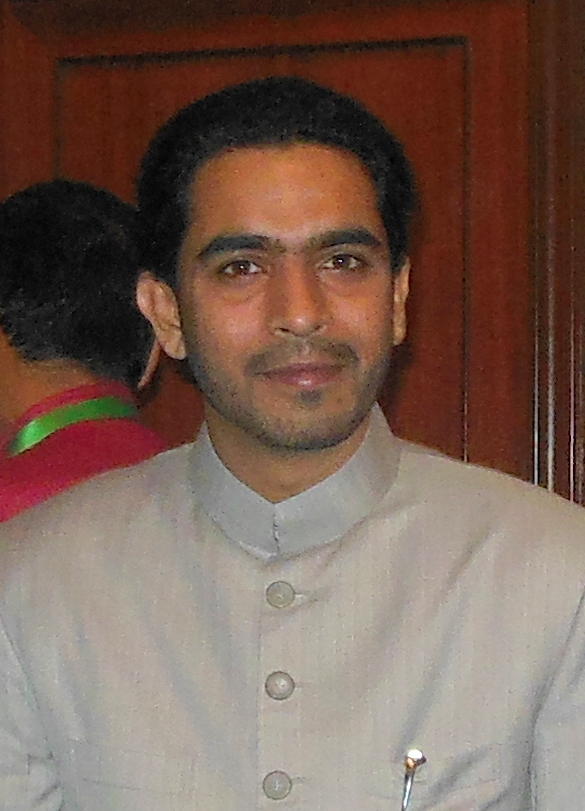
- Hussain in 2012

Member of Legislative Assembly, Telangana
- Incumbent
- Assumed office 3 December 2023
- Preceded by: Jaffer Hussain
- Constituency: Nampally

2nd Mayor of Hyderabad
- In office 4 January 2012 – 7 May 2014
- Deputy: G. Rajkumar
- Preceded by: Banda Karthika Reddy
- Succeeded by: Bonthu Ram Mohan
- Constituency: Ahmed Nagar

Personal details
- Born: 9 April 1980 (age 46) Hyderabad, Telangana, India
- Party: All India Majlis-e-Ittehadul Muslimeen
- Education: Osmania University

Mohammad Majid Hussain (born 9 April 1980) is an Indian politician who is currently the Member of the Telangana Legislative Assembly representing the Nampally Assembly constituency and corporator of Mehdipatnam ward of the Greater Hyderabad Municipal Corporation.

He was the former Mayor of Hyderabad and belongs to the All India Majlis-e-Ittehadul-Muslimeen party.

== Early life and family ==
Majid Hussain's schooling was at St Theresa's School, Humayun Nagar and intermediate at Sultan Uloom College, Banjara Hills. He graduated from Anwar Uloom College, Mallepally in Bachelor of Computer Applications.

Hussain initially worked as an Executive with HSBC in the migration and credit card division. After working for 5 years, he left his job and plunged into active politics.
Both Majid's father and mother are retired gazetted officers. His father, MH Maqsood is a retired physical director and was Chairman of the AP selection committee of handball, while his mother Qaisar Jahan, headmistress of the Government Girls High School, First Lancer. Majid's brother Mohammed Shakir Hussain, who is a software professional, stays in the US.

== Political career ==
Majid Hussain was hand-picked by the AIMIM President Asaduddin Owaisi and became the Corporator of Ahmednagar division in the 2009 GHMC Municipal elections.

On 4 January 2012, Majid's candidature as GHMC Mayor was proposed by AIMIM's Doodhbowli corporator MA Ghaffar and was supported by the former mayor Banda Karthika Reddy. In a span of 15 minutes, the election process was completed and 31-year-old Hussain was declared the new mayor of GHMC. After a gap of 12 years MIM had succeeded in installing its own mayor in the city with Hussain being the youngest mayor the city had.

On 7 March 2014 citing instructions from his party, Hussain had submitted his resignation. This move was presented as honouring the agreement with Congress on seat-sharing but it was widely speculated that Hussain was being readied to contest from one of the Assembly constituencies in the city. Amid high drama, and apparently driven by political equations emerging ahead of the Assembly elections, the resignation of Mayor Majid Hussain was rejected by the GHMC's General Council.

Majid Hussain won as the Corporator of Mehdipatnam division in the 2016 GHMC Municipal elections. During the 2018 Telangana Assembly elections, Majid Hussain was made the Election in-charge of Nampally constituency in which AIMIM won the seat.

In 2020 Bihar General Elections, Majid Hussain was again made the election in-charge where AIMIM won 5 seats.

Hussain was again elected as the Corporator of Mehdipatnam in the 2020 GHMC Municipal Elections.

Hussain was declared as the AIMIM candidate from the Nampally constituency in the 2023 Telangana Legislative Assembly election which he subsequently won by narrowly defeating Congress candidate Mohammed Feroz Khan and replaced incumbent Jaffer Hussain who instead became MLA of Yakhutpura constituency.

== Controversies ==
Clash with Congress Leader Feroz Khan (October 2024):

In October 2024, a violent altercation occurred between supporters of Majid Hussain and Congress leader Feroz Khan in the Humayun Nagar area of Nampally. The confrontation escalated over a dispute regarding the construction of a cement-concrete road. Both parties engaged in stone-pelting and physical altercations, resulting in injuries to several individuals. The incident drew significant media attention and raised concerns about political tensions in the region.
