= Padmanabha Nagar Colony =

Human settlement in Hyderabad, India

- neighborhood
- Location in Hyderabad, India
- Coordinates: 17.391561°N 78.427901°E
- Country: India
- State: Telangana
- District: Hyderabad District
- City: Hyderabad

Government
  - Body: GHMC

Languages
  - Official: Telugu Urdu
- Vehicle registration: TG-13
- Lok Sabha constituency: Hyderabad
- Planning agency: GHMC

Padmanabha Nagar Colony is a residential neighborhood located in Rethibowli near Khader Bagh in Mehdipatnam, Hyderabad, India. The colony is located beside the PVNR Expressway and Laxminagar Colony. The colony is famous for Sai Baba, Ganapathy, Shiva, Durga & Hanuman temples (all in one complex) which attracts a lot of devotees from the neighbouring area. This is located near PVNR pillar no. 54.
