= Riaz Ahmed (volleyball) =

Indian volleyball player (1939–2023)

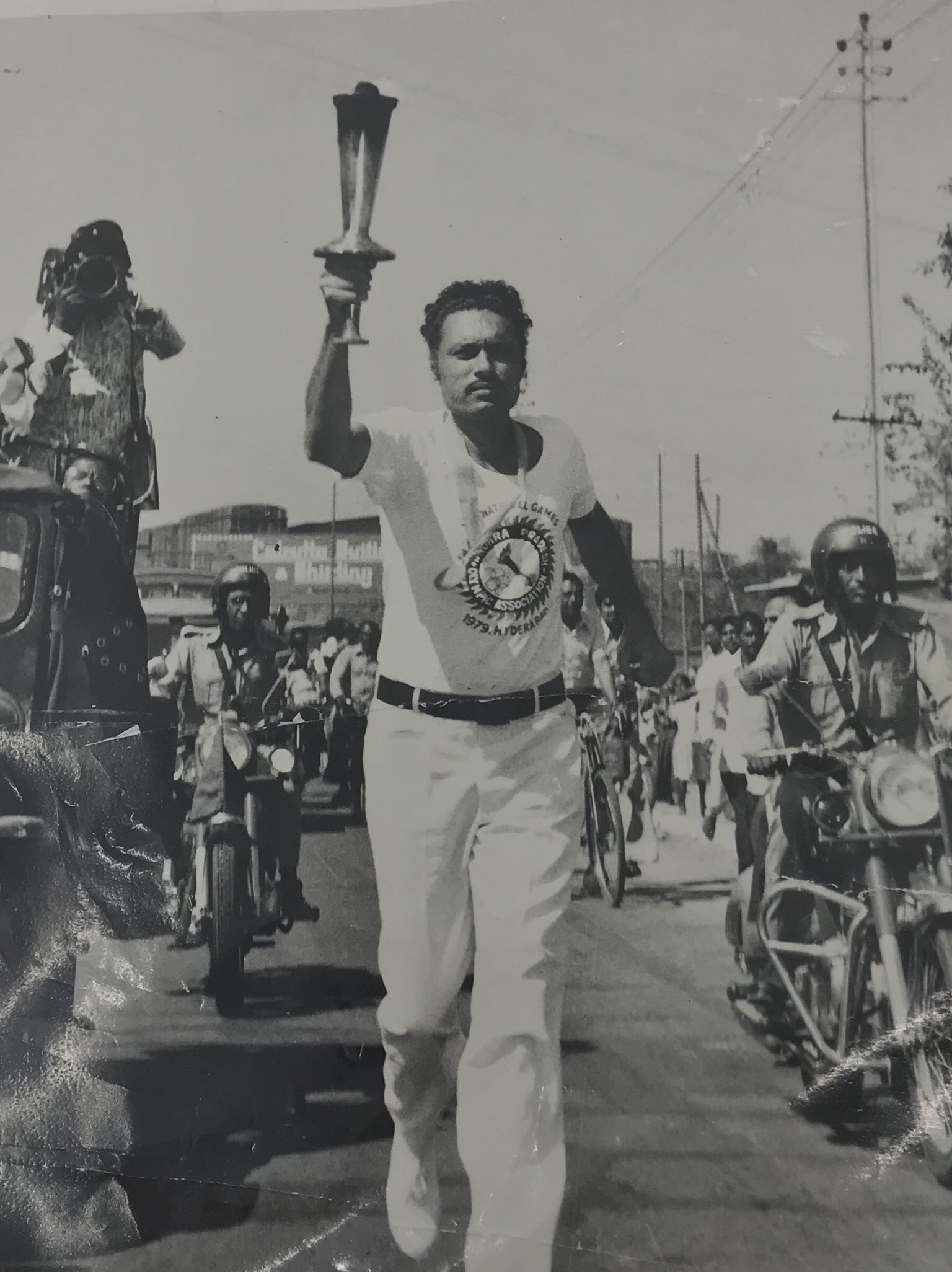
- Ahmed running in a ceremony in the Hyderabad Sports Tournament 1979

Personal information
- Full name: Syed Riaz Ahmed Rizvi
- Nickname: "Riaz Dada"
- Nationality: Indian
- Born: 7 April 1939; Mallepally, Hyderabad State, British Raj
- Died: 18 September 2023 (aged 84); Richmond, Virginia, U.S.
- Hometown: Hyderabad, India
- Height: 1.90 m (6 ft 3 in)
- Weight: 81 kg (179 lb)

Volleyball information
- Position: Setter/All Rounder

National team
1961–1973	India

Riaz Ahmed (7 April 1939 – 18 September 2023) was an Indian volleyball player. He represented the India national team as a senior player at the 1966 Asian Games.

== Biography ==
Ahmed was born in Mallepally, a suburb of Hyderabad. He was the eldest son of Syed Mohammed Rizvi and Afsar Jahan. He was encouraged to play volleyball by his soccer coach in high school, because he noticed how Ahmed was a one of a kind athlete. In 1958, Ahmed became a member of the Andhra Pradesh Police Academy volleyball team. In 1960, he joined the India men's national volleyball team camp with Tilakam Gopal and Balwant Singh as well as many other Police cadets. Ahmed represented the National Team several times from 1961 to 1973.

Ahmed played for India's national volleyball team in the Asian Games in Bangkok (1966), where India took the 4th Seat. He was one of the Indian team's most Senior players that influenced great players such as Jimmy George and Abdul Basith who played in the Asian Games in Tehran (1974), Bangkok (1978) and in Seoul (1986) where India won the bronze medal. He was captain of the Indian team that played at Saudi Arabia in 1985, and led the Indian team to victory in India Gold Cup International Volleyball Tournament at Hyderabad in 1986.

Ahmed died in Richmond, Virginia on 18 September 2023, at the age of 84.

== Competitions ==
Ahmed competed in the following international competitions:

- Represented the Indian volleyball team in the Inter-National Matches.
- 1961 – Represented India in the test match against the visiting Japanese team held at Calcutta.
- 1964 – Was a member of the Indian volleyball team which participated in the Olympics? at Delhi in which all the Asian countries participated and won the bronze medal.
- 1965 – Was a captain of the Indian volleyball team which played five test matches against the visiting USSR team. The tests were played at Delhi, Bhilai, Rowa, Calcutta, and Cuttack.
- 1965 – The Indian team also played two unofficial matches against the Russian team at Balaghat and Allahabad. Ahmed was a captain of the team in these matches.
- 1966 – Was a Captain of the Indian volleyball team which participated in the Asian Games at Bangkok.
- 1967 – Was a Captain of the Indian team against the visiting Ceylonese volleyball team. The test matches were held at Calcutta and Dalmianagar.
- 1970 – Member of the Indian team which played five test matches against the visiting Paris University team. (The Paris University team contained six players who represented the French volleyball team) The tests were played at Hyderabad, Trivandrum, Jamshedpur, Udaipur, and Bombay. Ahmed was one of the captains of the Indian team at Hyderabad.

In the Inter-Civil Services All India Tournaments, Ahmed alongside Tilakam Gopal represented the Andhra Pradesh Civil Service volleyball team.

Year	Place of tournament	Rank
1967	Nagapur	Winners
1968	Madras	Winners
1969	Jaipur	Runners-up
1970	Ahemabad	Winners

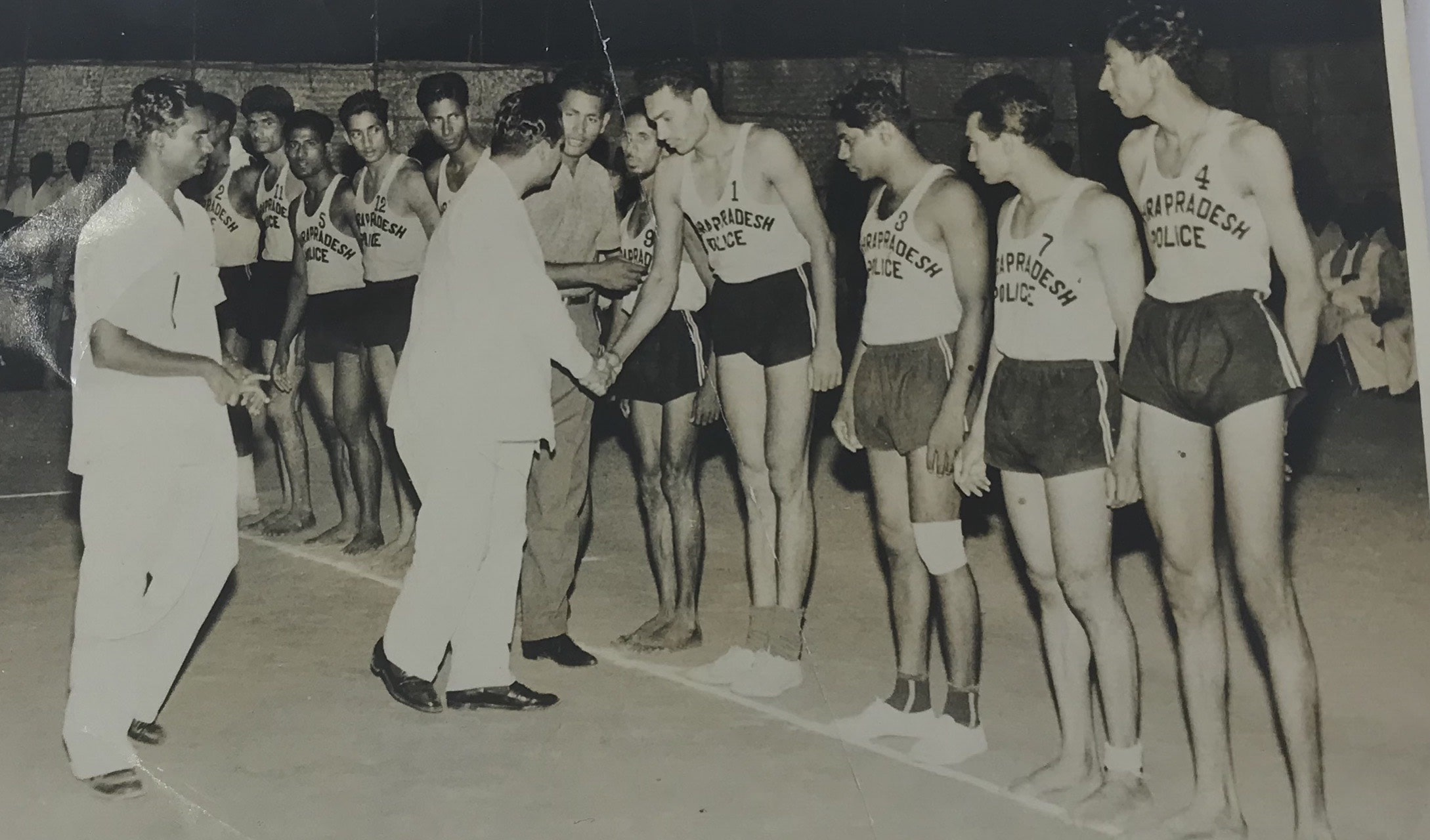
Riaz Ahmed (seen shaking hands) with an official.

At the All India Inter Departmental Nationals, he represented the Andhra Pradesh Police Team:

Year	Rank
1967	Winners
1968	Winners
1969	Winners *
1970	Winners *

- (Riaz And Gopal were Co-Captains of these teams)

At the All India Inter-Police Meets, he represented the Andhra Pradesh Police Team and helped the team to the following results:

Year	Rank
1960	Winners
1961	Winners
1962	Runners-up
1963	Winners
1964	Runners-up
1965	Runners-up
1965	Runners-up
1966	Runners-up
1967	Runners-up
1968	Runners-up
1969	Runners-up
1970	Third place

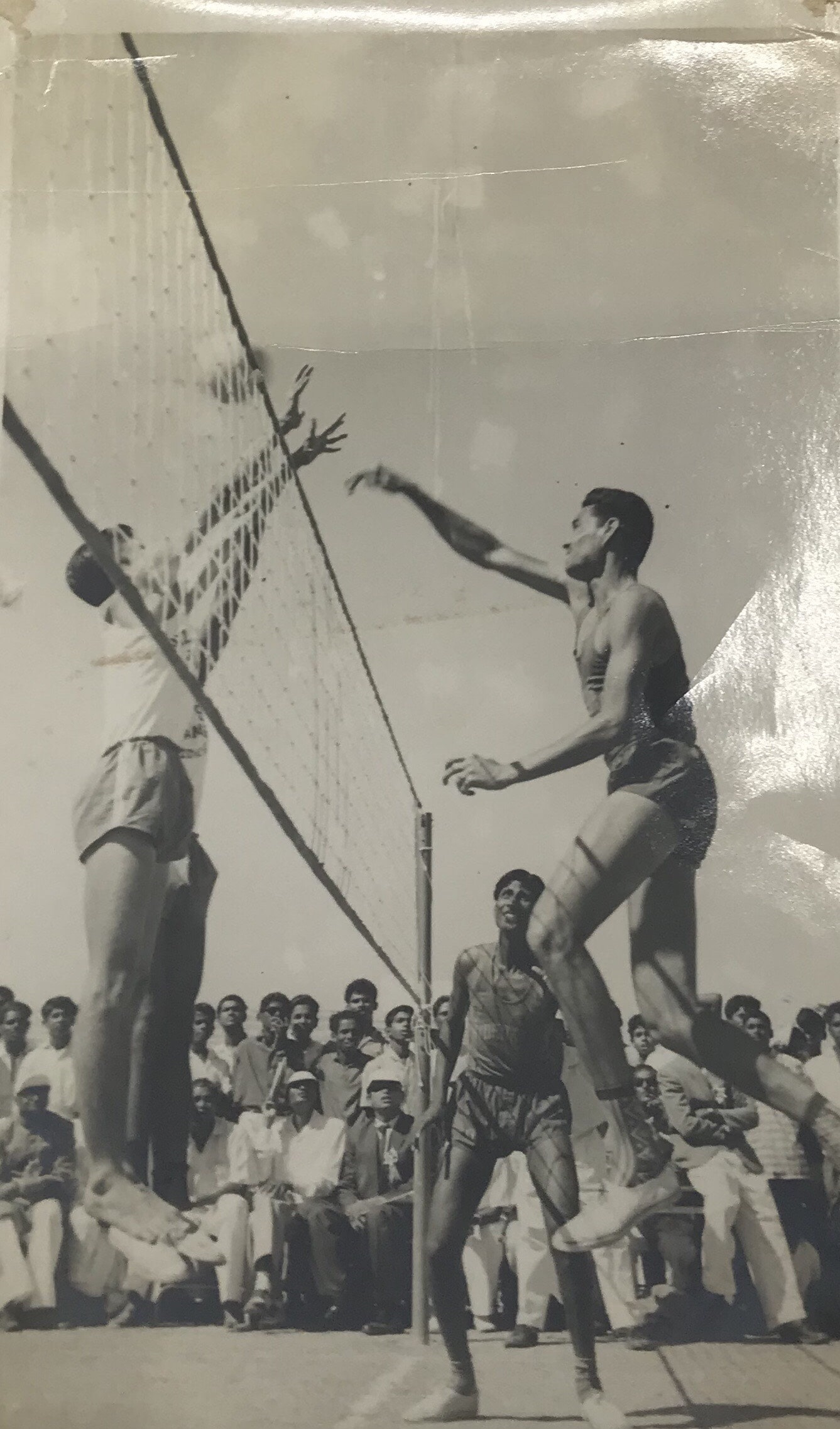
