= Nanalnagar =

- Neighbourhood
- Location in Telangana, India Nanalnagar (Telangana) Nanalnagar (India)
- Coordinates: 17.394611°N 78.427167°E
- Country: India
- State: Telangana
- District: Hyderabad
- Metro: Hyderabad

Government
  - Body: GHMC

Population
  - Total: 150,000

Languages
  - Official: Telugu and Urdu
- Time zone: UTC+5:30 (IST)
- PIN: 500 028
- Vehicle registration: TS-13
- Lok Sabha constituency: Hyderabad
- Vidhan Sabha constituency: Karwan
- Planning agency: GHMC

Congress Hand Signal

Nanalnagar is a ward under the Greater Hyderabad Municipal Corporation in the city of Hyderabad, Telangana in India, it is bounded by Banjara Hills and Ahmed Nagar wards to the north, Shaikpet and Tolichowki to the east, Langar Houz and Gudimalkapur to the south and Mehdipatnam and Vijaynagar Colony to the west.

The commercial area is on the Nanalnagar Road (from Congress Hand Statue to the tri-junction that leads towards Langar Houz and Gudimalkapur).
