= Laxminagar Colony, Mehdipatnam =

Laxminagar Colony
- Neighbourhood
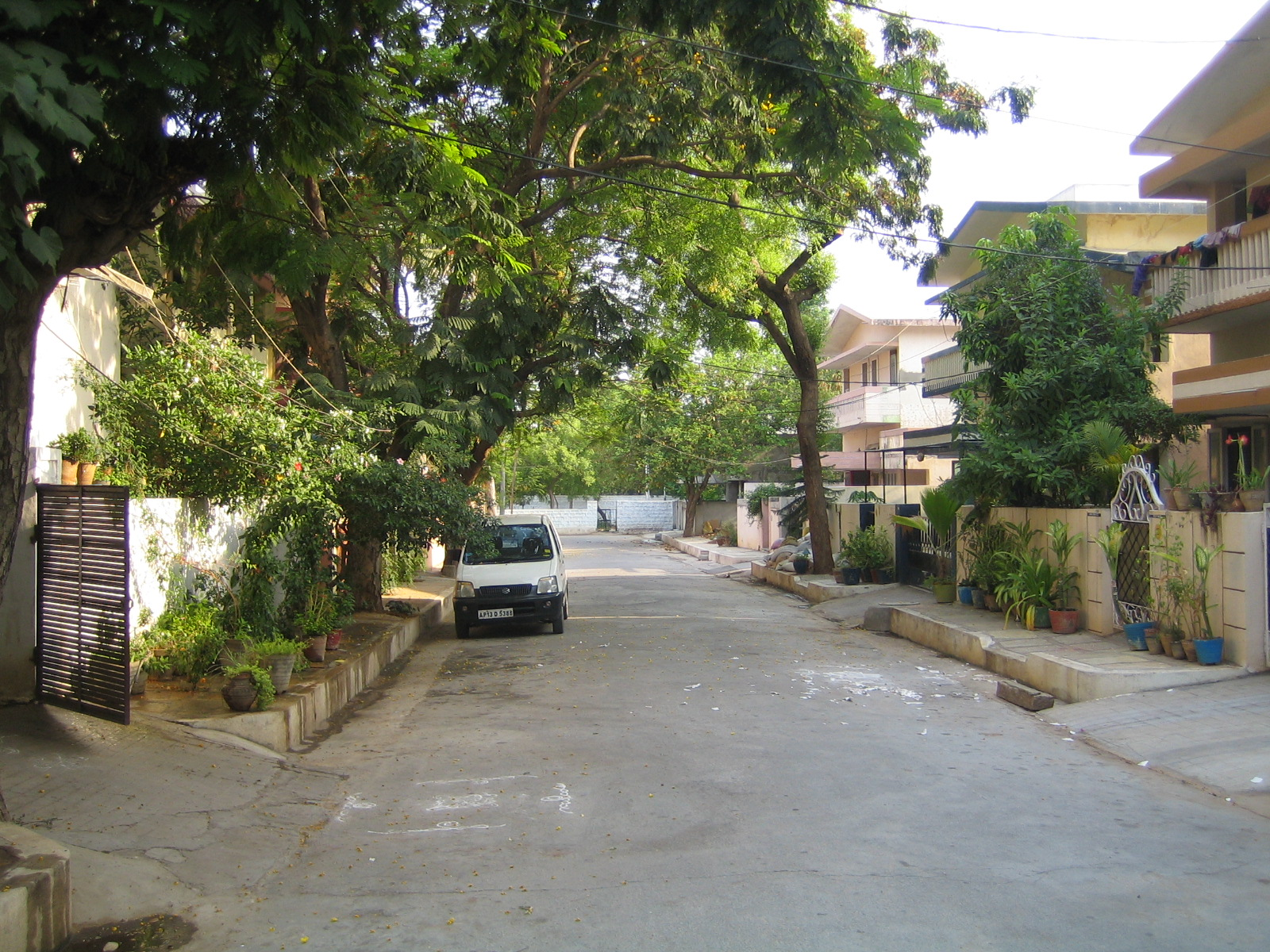

- Location in Telangana, India Laxminagar Colony (Telangana) Laxminagar Colony (India)
- Coordinates: 17.387081°N 78.428843°E
- Country: India
- State: Telangana
- District: Hyderabad
- Metro: Hyderabad

Government
  - Body: GHMC

Languages
  - Official: Telugu
- Time zone: UTC+5:30 (IST)
- PIN: 500 028
- Vehicle registration: TG
- Lok Sabha constituency: Hyderabad
- Vidhan Sabha constituency: Karwan
- Planning agency: GHMC
- Website: telangana.gov.in

Laxminagar Colony is a gated community in Hyderabad, India. It is near the Gudimalkapur crossroads, near Mehdipatnam, on the Ring Road that leads to Bangalore from Hyderabad.

This colony consists of 30–40 independent bungalow/houses. Bordering this colony on its Western side is a large Indian Army establishment.

== Commercial area ==
Shopping options are ample as it is close to Mehdipatnam and Gudimalkapur. One road leads to Nanalnagar where there is a More Supermarket apart from a host of kirana and other shops.

This road continues to Gudimalkapaur on the other side. Gudimalkapur is the site of the Gudimalkapur Wholesale Vegetable Market and Heritage Fresh.

== Transport ==
Since this colony is close to Mehdipatnam it is well connected by TSRTC buses.
