= Chintal Basti =

Locality in Hyderabad, India

Chintal Basti is name of the locality in the city of Hyderabad, capital city of Telangana adjacent to Masab Tank, A.C. Guards, Prem Nagar.

Vijay Marie Hospital is located in Veer Nagar, Chintal Basti. Ambedkar hall
