= Jaffer Hussain =

Indian politician

Jaffar Hussain Meraj

Member of Telangana Legislative Assembly (Yakutpura Assembly Constituency)
- In office 2014 - Present
- Preceded by: Mohammed Mumtaz khan
- Constituency: 2014-2023 - Nampally; 2023-Incumbent - Yakutpura

Deputy Mayor Of Greater Hyderabad Municipal Corporation
- In office 2009 - 2012

Personal details
- Born: 26 January 1960 (age 66) Hyderabad
- Party: All India Majlis-e-Ittehadul Muslimeen
- Parent: Late Ahmed Hussain (father)

Jaffar Hussain Meraj (born 26 January 1960) is an Indian politician from Telangana. He is a leader of All India Majlis-e-Ittehadul Muslimeen (AIMIM) and a three time MLA. He won from Yakutpura constituency in the 2023 Telangana Legislative Assembly elections.

== Early life and education ==
Hussain was born in Hyderabad, in the erstwhile united Andhra Pradesh. His father, Ahmed Hussain, was a former legislator from Seetarambagh.

In 1967, Hussain's sons Minhaj Hussain and Maqsood Hussain completed their MBA and took charge of the Hussain family business. Maqsood Hussain died in 2018 after a prolonged illness.

== Career ==
Jaffer Hussain was elected to the Greater Hyderabad Municipal Corporation for the first time in 2009 municipal elections from Tolichowki. He was then elected as Deputy Mayor of GHMC from 2009 to 2012.

He was elected as an MLA for the first time in the 2014 Andhra Pradesh Legislative Assembly election from Nampally Assembly Constituency defeating Mohammed Feroz Khan from Telugu Desam Party by a margin of 17,296 votes. In the 2018 Assembly elections, he retained his seat defeating rival Feroz Khan, who represented Indian National Congress party. Hussain got 57,940 votes while Khan managed to get 48,265 votes.

He won for third time contesting from Yakutpura Assembly constituency representing All India Majlis-e-Ittehadul Muslimeen in the 2023 Telangana Legislative Assembly elections. He polled 46,153 votes and defeated his nearest rival, Amjed Ullah Khan of Majlis Bachao Tehreek, by a narrow margin of 878 votes. Amjed Khan got 45,275 votes.

Earlier, he was the Deputy Mayor of Greater Hyderabad Municipal Corporation (GHMC) from 2009 to 2012.

== Positions held ==
#	From	To	Position	Party
1.	2009	2012	Deputy Mayor of GHMC (1st term)	AIMIM
2.	2014	2018	MLA (1st term) from Nampally	AIMIM
3.	2018	2023	MLA (2nd term) from Nampally	AIMIM
4	2023	Incumbent	MLA from Yakutpura	AIMIM

== Controversies ==
Assault on Congress Workers (November 2020)

In November 2020, Jaffar Hussain Meraj was involved in a controversy when an assault case was filed against him and three associates for allegedly attacking Congress workers in the Ahmed Nagar area of Hyderabad. The incident occurred when Congress leaders, including Masood Ahmed, were distributing cash relief to flood-affected families. Meraj and his supporters reportedly objected to the relief distribution, leading to a physical altercation. The Congress workers claimed they were assaulted, resulting in injuries to one of their leaders, who had to be treated at a local hospital. A case was registered under various sections of the Indian Penal Code, including those related to assault and intimidation.
