= Banda Karthika Reddy =

Indian politician (1977)

1st Mayor of Hyderabad
- In office 4 December 2009 – 4 December 2011
- Deputy: Mohammad Majid Hussain
- Preceded by: Office established (Teegala Krishna Reddy as Mayor of Municipal Corporation Hyderabad)
- Succeeded by: Mohammad Majid Hussain
- Constituency: Tarnaka

Personal details
- Born: 17 August 1977 (age 49) Hyderabad, Telangana
- Party: Bharatiya Janata Party (since 2020)
- Other political affiliations: Indian National Congress (until 2020)
- Spouse: Banda Chandra Reddy
- Children: 2

Banda Karthika Reddy (born 17 August 1977) is an Indian politician and former Mayor of Greater Hyderabad Municipal Corporation (GHMC), Telangana, India. She was the first mayor of GHMC, elected in 2009 and is a member of the Bharatiya Janata Party.

== Early life ==
Karthika Banda was born on 17 August 1977 in Hyderabad, India. She is a post-graduate in Sociology from Osmania University and a sportswoman.

== Political career ==
She became the first mayor of GHMC in December 2009 from the Indian National Congress.

In 2010, she became the vice-chairperson of All India Mayors' Council. Later in 2020, she joined the Bharatiya Janata Party.

== Personal life ==
Karthika Reddy is married to Banda Chandra Reddy. They have two sons.
