= Tolichowki =

Toli Chowki
- Neighbourhood
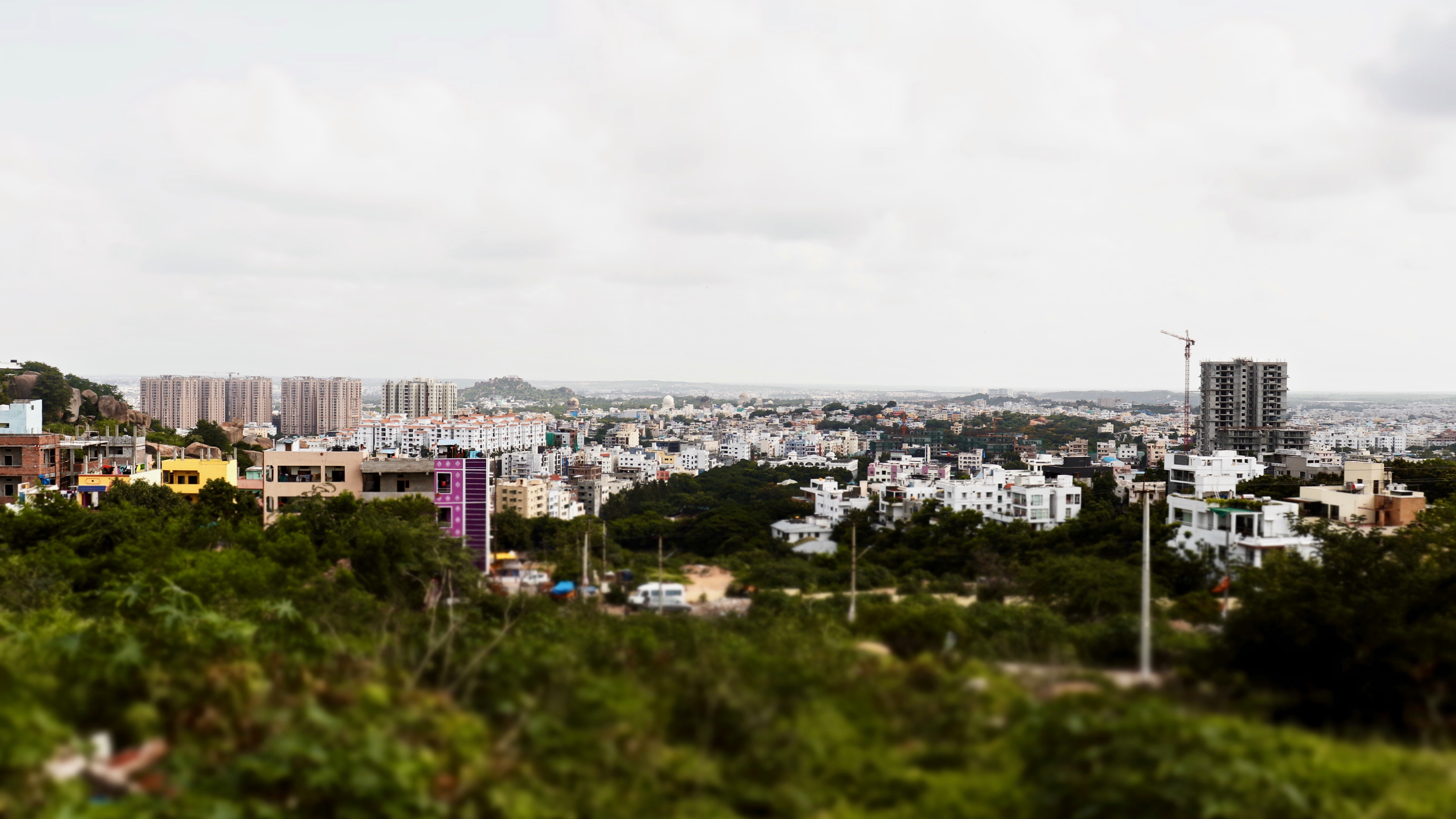
- View of Tolichowki from Film Nagar hill

- Location in Hyderabad, Telangana, India Toli Chowki (Telangana) Toli Chowki (India)
- Coordinates: 17°22′28″N 78°26′30″E
- Country: India
- State: Telangana
- District: Hyderabad
- Metro: Hyderabad

Government
  - Body: GHMC

Languages
  - Official: Urdu, Telugu English
- Time zone: UTC+5:30 (IST)
- PIN: 500 008
- Vehicle registration: TG 13
- Lok Sabha constituency: Hyderabad
- Vidhan Sabha constituency: Karwan
- Planning agency: GHMC
- Website: telangana.gov.in

Tolichowki is a neighbourhood in Hyderabad, Telangana, India. The name Tolichowki comes from the Urdu word 'Toli', meaning 'troupe', and 'Chowki', meaning 'post'. It is close to the IT corridor like Gachibowli, Madhapur, Manikonda and Kondapur, hence making it a preferred residential for people working in the IT industry. The real estate sector has received a boost due to its proximity to high-end technology firms. Tolichowki has also had a boost in the restaurant and fast food industry. It is known to attract many customers from all around due to having multi-cuisine meals all around the area. There has been an emergence of Arab cuisine in the area due to Middle Eastern people's moving in the area for medical or academic purposes. This in return has improved Tolichowki's market value for foreigners.

== History ==
During the period of Abul Hasan Qutb Shah, the troops of the Mughal Emperor Aurangzeb Alamgir set a military position in this region, the troops of the Mughal Emperor Aurangzeb Alamgir set a military position in this region which is in the vicinity of the Golconda Fort of the Qutb Shahi dynasty. Till today, there are many historical structures like mosques, tombs and other monuments in the surrounding area.

== Landmarks ==
In Tolichowki, notable landmarks include the Qutb Shahi tombs and the Golconda Fort.

== Transport ==
There are many buses which connect to different parts of the city. There are buses from Toli Chowki to:

- Mehdipatnam
- Lakdi ka pul
- Abids
- Koti
- Secunderabad (bus transfer in Mehdipatnam)
- Charminar (bus transfer in Mehdipatnam)
- Shaikpet
- Hitec City
- Gachibowli
- Patancheru
- BHEL

Apart from public buses, mini-taxis are also available from Toli Chowki.

== GHMC location ==
According to GHMC, Tolichowki comes under Circle 7, Ward 70 Administrative divisions of Hyderabad.
