= Tilakam Gopal =

Indian volleyball player

Gopal Tilakam
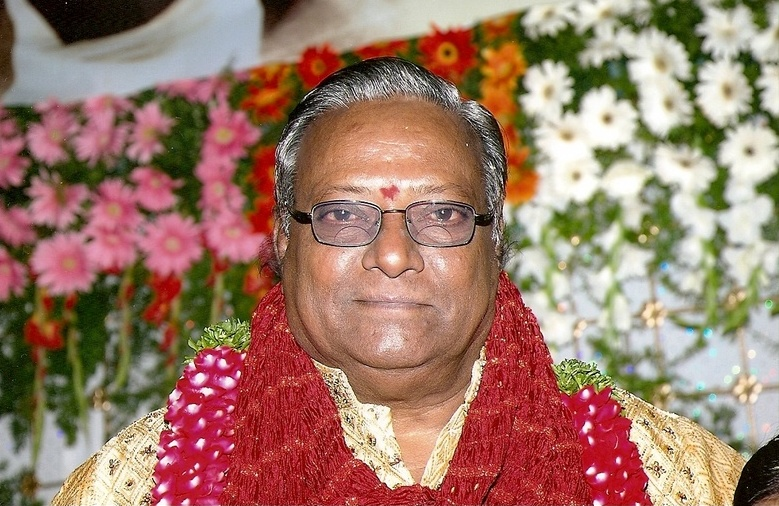

Personal information
- Born: 20 August 1941; Hyderabad, India
- Died: 18 December 2012 (aged 71); Hyderabad, India

T. Gopal (Gopal Tilakam) (born 20 August 1941 - 18 December 2012) was a former volleyball player from India. He captained the India national team at the 1966 Asian Games.

== Overview ==
In the Inter-Civil Services All India Tournaments, Gopal represented the Andhra Pradesh Civil Service volleyball team:

Year	Place of tournament	Rank
1967	Nagapur	Winners
1968	Madras	Winners
1969	Jaipur	Runners-up
1970	Ahemabad	Winners

At the All India Inter Departmental Nationals, he represented the Andhra Pradesh Police Team:

Year	Rank
1967	Winners
1968	Winners
1969	Winners *
1970	Winners *

- means Gopal was captain of the Andhra Pradesh Police Team

At the All India Inter-Police Meets, he represented the Andhra Pradesh Police Team and helped the team to the following results:

Year	Rank
1960	Winners
1961	Winners
1962	Runners-up
1963	Winners
1964	Runners-up
1965	Runners-up
1965	Runners-up
1966	Runners-up
1967	Runners-up
1968	Runners-up
1969	Runners-up
1970	Third place

At the National Volleyball Championship, he represented Andhra Pradesh:

Year	Place of tournament	Rank
1958–59	Jamshedpur	Selected to play
1960–61	Madras	Selected to play
1970–71	Delhi	Selected to play
1971–72	Jabalpur	Selected to play
1972–73	Allahabad	Reached semi-final
1973–74	Gwalior	Reached semi-final
1974–75	1.) Madras 2.) Bangalore	1.)South Zone Championships 2.)Winners of Nationals
1975–76 and 1976–77	Hyderabad	South Zone Winners
1977–78	Calcutta Zonal	Winners
1978–79	Trivandrum	Runners-up
1979–80	Udaipur	Selected to play
1980–81	Gauhati	Selected to play

== International matches ==
Gopal competed in the following international competitions:

- Represented the Indian volleyball team in the Inter-National Matches.
- 1961 – Represented India in the test match against the visiting Japanese team held at Calcutta.
- 1962 – Was a member of the Indian volleyball team which participated in the Asian Games at Jakarta and received a silver medal.
- 1963 – Was a member of the Indian volleyball team which toured the USSR. The team won against the Romanian team, who were European champions.
- 1964 – Was a member of the Indian volleyball team which participated in the Olympics at Delhi in which all the Asian countries participated and won the bronze medal.
- 1965 – Was a captain of the Indian volleyball team which played five test matches against the visiting USSR team. The tests were played at Delhi, Bhilai, Rowa, Calcutta, and Cuttack.
- 1965 – The Indian team also played two unofficial matches against the Russian team at Balaghat and Allahabad. Gopal was captain of the team in these matches.
- 1966 – Captain of the Indian volleyball team which participated in the Asian Games at Bangkok.
- 1967 – Captain of the Indian team against the visiting Ceylonese volleyball team. The test matches were held at Calcutta and Dalmianagar.
- 1970 – Member of the Indian team which played five test matches against the visiting Paris University team. (The Paris University team contained six players who represented the French volleyball team) The tests were played at Hyderabad, Trivandrum, Jamshedpur, Udaipur, and Bombay. Gopal was captain of the Indian team at Hyderabad.

=== Post-playing career ===
After his playing career ended, Gopal did the following:

- 1981 – Attended International Referee's Course at London (UK) and official matches at the Commonwealth Games in Nottingham.
- 1982 – Officiated international matches in 9th Asian Games held at New Delhi.
- 1983 – Officiated test matches between India and USSR in India.
- 1990 – Visited as a Chief-De-Mission of the Andhra Pradesh team which participated in the international tournament held at Perth, Australia and won third place.
- 1991 – Visited as Chief-De-Mission of the Indian junior team which participated in the 5th Indian Asian Games held at Bangkok.
- Senior Vice President of Andhra Pradesh Volleyball Association and retired at the Police Department as a Superintendent of Police, Intelligence.

== Awards ==
- Uttam Seva Patkam
- Mahonnatha Seva Patkam 15 August 1999
- Indian Police Medal
- Was awarded a plaque by Sri. Sarvepalli Radhakrishnan, Vice-President of India, at New Delhi in 1961 during the National Games.
- Received Bronze Medal from Sri. Zakir Husain, President of India, in Pre-Olympic Games held at New Delhi in 1964.
- Received a memento from President Neelam Sanjiva Reddy in July 1979.

== Death ==
Gopal died in Hyderabad on 18 December 2012, at the age of 71
