= Yakutpura Assembly constituency =

Constituency of the Telangana legislative assembly in India

Coordinates: 17.359°N 78.485°E

Yakutpura
- Constituency No. 68 for the Telangana Legislative Assembly
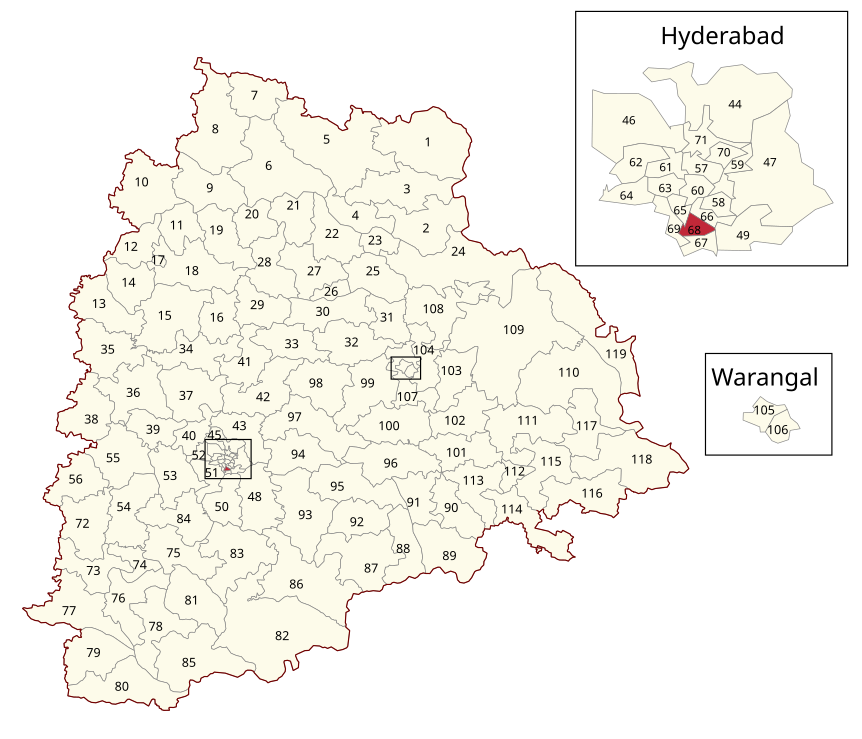
- Location of Yakutpura Assembly constituency within Telangana

Constituency details
- Country: India
- Region: South India
- State: Telangana
- District: Hyderabad
- Lok Sabha constituency: Hyderabad
- Established: 1957
- Total electors: 2,83,369
- Reservation: None

Member of Legislative Assembly
- 3rd Telangana Legislative Assembly
- Incumbent Jaffer Hussain
- Party: AIMIM
- Elected year: 2023

Yakutpura Assembly constituency is a constituency of Telangana Legislative Assembly, India. It is one of 15 constituencies in the capital city of Hyderabad. It is part of Hyderabad Lok Sabha constituency.

Jaffar Hussain Mehraj of All India Majlis-e-Ittehadul Muslimeen is representing the constituency from 2023.

== Extent of the constituency ==
The Assembly Constituency presently comprises the following neighbourhoods:

Neighbourhood
Yakutpura
Madannapet
Dabeerpura
Bada Baazar
Rein Baazar

== Members of Legislative Assembly Begum Bazar ==
Year	Member	Political party
1952	Vaidya Kashinath Rao	Indian National Congress

== Members of Legislative Assembly Yakutpura ==
Year	Member	Political party
Andhra Pradesh
1957	Shabuddin Ahmed Khan	Indian National Congress
1962	M. A. Rasheed	Indian National Congress
1967	K. Nizamuddin	Independent
1972	Sultan Salahuddin Owaisi	Independent
1978	Baqerr Agha	Independent
1983	Khaja Abu Sayeed	Independent
1985	Ibrahim Bin Abdullah Masqati	Independent
1989	Ibrahim Bin Abdullah Masqati	All India Majlis-e-Ittehadul Muslimeen
1994	Mumtaz Ahmed Khan	Majlis Bachao Tehreek
1999	Mumtaz Ahmed Khan	All India Majlis-e-Ittehadul Muslimeen
2004	Mumtaz Ahmed Khan	All India Majlis-e-Ittehadul Muslimeen
2009	Mumtaz Ahmed Khan	All India Majlis-e-Ittehadul Muslimeen
Telangana
2014	Mumtaz Ahmed Khan	All India Majlis-e-Ittehadul Muslimeen
2018	Syed Ahmed Pasha Quadri	All India Majlis-e-Ittehadul Muslimeen
2023	Jaffer Hussain	All India Majlis-e-Ittehadul Muslimeen

== Election results ==
Vote share of Winning candidates
2023	32.86%
2018	49.07%
2014	45.84%
2009	53.82%
2004	57.54%
1999	48.07%
1994	44.17%
1989	72.95%
1985	78.60%
1983	74.24%
1978	48.85%
1972	56.02%
1967	54.42%
1962	46.11%
1957	57.94%
1951	72.48%

=== 2023 ===
2023 Telangana Legislative Assembly election: Yakutpura
Party	Candidate	Votes	%	±%
AIMIM	Jaffer Hussain	46,153	32.86	
MBT	Amjed Ullah Khan	45,275	32.24	
BJP	N. Veerender Babu Yadav	22,354	15.92	
BRS	Sama Sunder Reddy	15,516	11.05	
INC	K. Ravi Raj	6,954	4.95	
NOTA	None of the Above	704	0.50	
IND	14 Independent Candidates	2,446	1.74	
OTH	8 Other Party Candidates	1,032	0.73	
Majority		878	0.62	
Turnout		140,434	40.39	
AIMIM hold		Swing		

=== 2018 ===
2018 Telangana Legislative Assembly election: Yakutpura
Party	Candidate	Votes	%	±%
AIMIM	Syed Ahmed Pasha Quadri	69,595	49.07	
TRS	Sama Sunder Reddy	22,617	15.95	
MBT	Majeed Ullah Khan	21,222	14.96	
BJP	Ch. Roopraj	16,608	11.71	
INC	K. Rajender Raju	6,452	4.55	
NOTA	None of the Above	799	0.56	
IND	19 Independent Candidates	3,100	2.19	
OTH	6 Other Party Candidates	1,446	1.02	
Majority		46,978	33.12	
Turnout		141,839	42.62	
AIMIM hold		Swing		

=== 2014 ===
2014 Telangana Legislative Assembly election: Yakutpura
Party	Candidate	Votes	%	±%
AIMIM	Mumtaz Ahmed Khan	66,843	45.84	
BJP	Ch. Roop Raj	32,420	22.23	
MBT	Majeed Ullah Khan	28,793	19.75	
TRS	Shabbir Ahmed	7,862	5.39	
INC	Ashwin Reddy Mainampati	6,608	4.53	
NOTA	None of the Above	910	0.62	
AAP	Asma Shahnaz	631	0.43	
IND	6 Independent Candidates	1,188	0.81	
OTH	2 Other Party Candidates	569	0.39	
Majority		34,423	23.61	
Turnout		145,824	51.50	
AIMIM hold		Swing		

=== 2009 ===
2009 Andhra Pradesh Legislative Assembly election: Yakutpura
Party	Candidate	Votes	%	±%
AIMIM	Mumtaz Ahmed Khan	61,698	53.82	
MBT	Hamza Bin Omer Al Jabri	18,406	16.06	
INC	G. Rathnamaiah	11,966	10.44	
PRP	S. Raj Kumar	8,339	7.27	
BJP	P. Surendar	6,929	6.04	
LSP	N. Veerender Babu	4,566	3.98	
BSP	M. Ram Chandram	444	0.39	
PPOI	Darbar Chandra Sekhar Neelisetty	248	0.22	
IND	5 Independent Candidates	2,038	1.78	
Majority		43,292	37.76	
Turnout		114,634	50.83	
AIMIM hold		Swing		

=== 2004 ===
2004 Andhra Pradesh Legislative Assembly election: Yakutpura
Party	Candidate	Votes	%	±%
AIMIM	Mumtaz Ahmed Khan	50,194	57.54	
MBT	Mohammed Abdul Gani	15,578	17.86	
BJP	Siraj Unnissa Begum	13,530	15.51	
INC	Syed Raza Hussain Azad	7,090	8.13	
TRS	Mir Inayath Ali Baqari	837	0.96	
Majority		34,616	39.68	
Turnout		87,229		
AIMIM hold		Swing		

=== 1999 ===
1999 Andhra Pradesh Legislative Assembly election: Yakutpura
Party	Candidate	Votes	%	±%
AIMIM	Mumtaz Ahmed Khan	66,283	48.07	
MBT	Majidullah Khan	34,951	25.35	
BJP	G. Hanmanth Rao	26,226	19.02	
INC	Md. Abdul Sami	4,334	3.14	
IND	4 Independent Candidates	4,084	2.97	
OTH	4 Other Party Candidates	2,013	1.46	
Majority		31,332	22.72	
Turnout		137,893	69.35	
AIMIM hold		Swing		

=== 1994 ===
1994 Andhra Pradesh Legislative Assembly election: Yakutpura
Party	Candidate	Votes	%	±%
MBT	Mumtaz Ahmed Khan	39,575	44.17	
AIMIM	Syed Baqer Agha	30,918	34.50	
TDP	Mohd. Abdul Salam Sharfan	7,129	7.96	
BJP	K. Kareemulla Osmani	5,877	6.56	
INC	Sultana Jahan Begum	4,476	5.00	
NPP	Salam Bin Mohd.	114	0.13	
IND	4 Independent Candidates	1,518	1.70	
Majority		8,657	9.66	
Turnout		91,097	48.79	
Swing to MBT from AIMIM		Swing		

=== 1989 ===
1989 Andhra Pradesh Legislative Assembly election: Yakutpura
Party	Candidate	Votes	%	±%
AIMIM	Ibrahim Bin Abdullah Masqati	82,924	72.95	
INC	Ali Raza	18,267	16.07	
TDP	M. A. Rasheed Khan	11,056	9.73	
IND	S. M. Ramakrishna Goud	1,105	0.97	
DMM	Rashid Mohiuddin	162	0.14	
IND	Mehd. Gulam Hussain	154	0.14	
Majority		64,657	56.88	
Turnout		116,746	70.60	
Swing to AIMIM from Independent		Swing		

=== 1985 ===
1985 Andhra Pradesh Legislative Assembly election: Yakutpura
Party	Candidate	Votes	%	±%
IND	Ibrahim Bin Abdullah Masqati	62,125	78.60	
TDP	Mohammad Zaidi	12,410	15.70	
INC	Syed Hussain	3,393	4.29	
IND	6 Independent Candidates	1,110	1.41	
Majority		49,715	62.90	
Turnout		79,881	70.41	
Independent hold		Swing		

=== 1983 ===
1983 Andhra Pradesh Legislative Assembly election: Yakutpura
Party	Candidate	Votes	%	±%
IND	Khaja Abu Sayeed	46,127	74.24	
IND	Syed Sarfaraz Ali	6,491	10.45	
INC	Mohd. Jaleel Pasha	5,472	8.81	
BJP	Khaja Kareemullah	3,161	5.09	
JP	Dhanraj	444	0.71	
IND	Md. Abdul Salam Sharfan	305	0.49	
IND	K. Swshachary	135	0.22	
Majority		39,636	63.79	
Turnout		63,297	58.42	
Independent hold		Swing		

=== 1978 ===
1978 Andhra Pradesh Legislative Assembly election: Yakutpura
Party	Candidate	Votes	%	±%
IND	Baqer Agha	24,094	48.85	
JP	Syed Hasan	12,400	25.14	
INC(I)	M. A. Khan	8,052	16.33	
INC	Altaf Hussain Junaidi	2,972	6.03	
IND	Mohd. Baquer Hussain Shaz	1,195	2.42	
IND	Jamalapuram Rajya Lakshmi	262	0.53	
IND	Mir Mustafa Ali Baig	161	0.33	
IND	Syed Ahmed Mustafa Hussain	121	0.25	
IND	Kambalapalli Chandraiah	65	0.13	
Majority		11,694	23.71	
Turnout		50,275	58.42	
Independent hold		Swing		

=== 1972 ===
1972 Andhra Pradesh Legislative Assembly election: Yakutpura
Party	Candidate	Votes	%	±%
IND	Sultan Salahuddin Owaisi	26,621	56.02	
ABJS	R. Anjaiah	10,082	21.22	
INC	K. M. Khan	8,667	18.24	
STS	Muneer Jamal	892	1.88	
IND	K. Chandraiah	887	1.87	
IND	K. Nizamuddin	368	0.77	
Majority		16,539	34.80	
Turnout		48,727	63.44	
Independent hold		Swing		

=== 1967 ===
1967 Andhra Pradesh Legislative Assembly election: Yakutpura
Party	Candidate	Votes	%	±%
IND	K. Nizamuddin	17,543	54.42	
ABJS	S. R. Rao	7,636	23.69	
INC	M. A. Rasheed	5,354	16.61	
IND	G. P. Saxena	997	3.09	
IND	M. Taskeen	370	1.15	
SWA	N. Begum	338	1.05	
Majority		9,907	30.73	
Turnout		33,292	54.16	
Swing to Independent from INC		Swing		

=== 1962 ===
1962 Andhra Pradesh Legislative Assembly election: Yakutpura
Party	Candidate	Votes	%	±%
INC	M. A. Rasheed	12,578	46.11	
IND	Mir Mahbood Ali	9,490	34.79	
IND	Gurunath Pershad Saxena	3,026	11.09	
IND	Shareef Mohammed	2,185	8.01	
Majority		3,088	11.32	
Turnout		28,186	59.37	
INC hold		Swing		

=== 1957 ===
1957 Andhra Pradesh Legislative Assembly election: Yakutpura
Party	Candidate	Votes	%	±%
INC	Shabuddin Ahmed Khan	9,796	57.94	
PDF	Khurshid Hasan	3,707	21.93	
IND	Sadaat Jahan Razvi	3,404	20.13	
Majority		6,089	36.01	
Turnout		16,907	40.82	
INC hold		Swing		

=== 1951 ===
1951 Hyderabad Legislative Assembly election: Begum Bazar
Party	Candidate	Votes	%	±%
INC	Kashinath Rao Vaidya	15,794	72.48	
Socialist	Trimbak Das	3,077	14.12	
IND	S. Narasaiah	1,154	5.30	
HSPP	Narayan Das	1,044	4.79	
RRP	Sadashiv Rao	723	3.32	
Majority		12,717	58.36	
Turnout		21,792	44.73	
INC win (new seat)				

== See also ==
- Yakutpura
- List of constituencies of Telangana Legislative Assembly
