= Mehdipatnam =

- neighborhood
- Location in Hyderabad, India
- Coordinates: 17.3959°N 78.4312°E
- Country: India
- State: Telangana
- District: Hyderabad District
- City: Hyderabad
- Named for: Mehdi Nawaz Jung

Government
  - Body: GHMC

Area
  - Total: 4.19 km^{2} (1.62 sq mi)

Population
  - Total: 46,065
  - Density: 10,981/km^{2} (28,440/sq mi)

Languages
  - Official: Telugu Urdu
- Time zone: UTC+5:30 (IST)
- PIN: 500 028
- Vehicle registration: TG-13
- Lok Sabha constituency: Hyderabad
- Vidhan Sabha constituency: Nampally
- Planning agency: GHMC

Mehdipatnam is a locality and neighbourhood in the western part of the city of Hyderabad, India. It is located north of the Musi River near Asif Nagar and is named after Mehdi Nawaz Jung, a politician and bureaucrat of Hyderabad State.

Due to recent developments in the last few decades, Mehdipatnam has become a commercial centre known for its jewellery market and shopping complex.

== Commercial areas ==
Due to large developments in Mehdipatnam over the last two decades, the close proximity to other commercial centres, and its transport system, the town has become a shopping centre for many suburbs.

=== Gold market ===
Mehdipatnam houses the Okaz Complex, which has several jewelry stores such as Mujtaba Jewelers, Sri Krishna Jewelers, Danish Jewelers and Malabar Gold and Diamonds.

=== Function halls ===
The most notable function hall is the Kings Palace and Kings Kohinoor Convention (managed by Red Rose Palace), although Mehdipatnam has other function halls.

== Education ==
St. Ann's College for Women is located in Mehdipatnam along with the G. Pulla Reddy Educational Institutions, Prof. K. Nagi Reddy Educational & Cultural Society and Lal Bahadur Degree College

Other schools in Mehdipatnam include:

- Hidayah Islamic International School
- M.S. Creative School
- M.S High School
- Sri Chaitanya Techno School
- Delhi Public School

== Hospitals ==
Sarojini Devi Eye Hospital is located in Mehdipatnam. Jayabhushan Hospital is the oldest multi-specialty hospital in the neighbourhood.

Mehdipatnam also contains several other hospitals and medical clinics.

== Legislature ==
In the Lok Sabha, Mehdipatnam belongs to the Secunderabad Lok Sabha Constituency, with the current MP being Kishan Reddy.

In the Telangana Legislative Assembly (Vidhan Sabha) it is in the Nampally constituency, with Majid Hussain being the current MLA

In the Greater Hyderabad Municipal Corporation its Corporator is Majid Hussain, the former Mayor of Hyderabad.

== Neighbourhoods ==
- Laxminagar Colony
- Humayun Nagar
- Karwan
- Jiyaguda
- Murad Nagar
- Navodaya Colony
- Rama Murthy Colony
- Santosh Nagar colony
- Kanthinagar Colony
- Amba Gardens
- Padmanabha Nagar Colony
- Vishwasnagar Colony
- Ayodhyanagar
- Sarada Nagar
- Gudimalkapur
- Satyanaryananagar Colony
- SBI Colony
- LIC Colony
- Jaya Nagar Colony
- Dilshadnagar Colony
- Attapur
- Upperpally
- Hyderguda

== Religious places ==
=== Masjid-e-Azizia ===
Masjid-e-Azizia is the largest mosque in Mehdipatnam and is the headquarters of the Students Islamic Organization of India and Islamic Center of Jamaat-e-Islami Hind. It consists of four floors with ablution facilities on every floor.

More than 7,000 people attend the mosque for each prayer during the holy month of Ramadan. The Friday sermons are delivered in both Urdu and Arabic.

=== Khaja Gulshan Masjid ===
It is one of the oldest mosques in Mehdipatnam, with many sermons and speeches given by famous people. The dome is lit during Ramadan, making it the centre of attraction.

=== Other places of worship ===
- Masjid-e-Quba
- Masjid-e-Gumbad
- Methodist Church
- Qutub Shai Masjid (Choti Masjid)
- Masjid-e-Banu Wa Faiyaz
- Masjid-e-Mohammedia
- Rajarajeshwari Temple

== Transport ==
Mehdipatnam has a TSRTC bus depot, making it a hub of many buses going to all parts of the Hyderabad. The depot acts as a connector of various neighbourhoods across the city such as Chevella, Moinabad, Uppal, Secundrabad, Lingampally, Koti, Gachibowli, Madhapur, and Aramghar.

Mehdipatnam also provides transport to Rajiv Gandhi International Airport through the P. V. Narasimha Rao Expressway.

The closest MMTS train stations are at Nampally and Lakdikapool.

== Military ==
There is an Army base in Mehdipatnam.
