= Hyderabad district, India =

Hyderabad district
- District
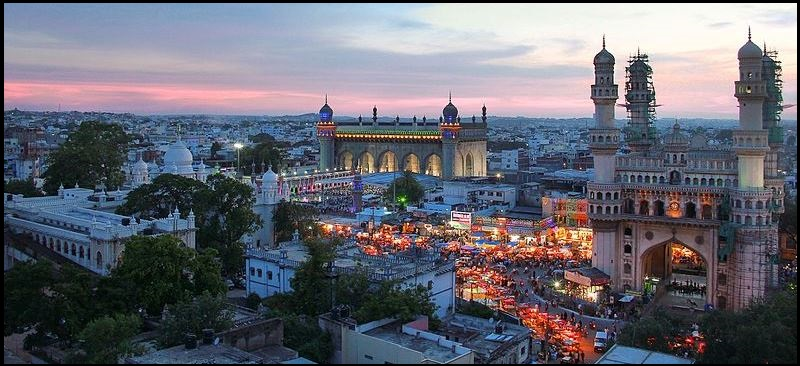
- Panorama of Charminar complex

- Location in Telangana
- Coordinates (Hyderabad): 17.366°N 78.476°E
- Country: India
- State: Telangana
- Mandalas: 16
- Established: 1948
- Headquarters: Hyderabad

Government
  - Parliament of India: Asaduddin Owaisi
  - District Collector: Harichandana Dasari , IAS
  - Parliament constituencies: 1.Hyderabad 2.Secunderabad
  - Assembly constituencies: 1.Musheerabad; 2.Malakpet; 3.Amberpet; 4.Khairatabad; 5.Jubilee Hills; 6.Sanathnagar; 7.Karwan; 8.Nampally; 9.Goshamahal; 10.Charminar; 11.Chandrayangutta; 12.Yakutpura; 13.Bahadurpura; 14.Secunderabad; 15.Secunderabad Cantt.

Area
  - District: 217 km^{2} (84 sq mi)

Population (2011)
  - District: 3,943,323
  - Density: 18,200/km^{2} (47,100/sq mi)
  - Urban: 100%

Demographics
  - Literacy: 83.25%
  - Sex ratio: 954
- Time zone: UTC+05:30 (IST)
- Vehicle registration: TG-09,10,11,12,13,14 Police Department Vehicle Under '𝟎𝟗' Starting With '𝐏'
- Major highways: NH-44, NH-65, NH-163, NH-765,
- Nominal GDP ( 2022-23 ): ₹228,623.08 crore (US$29.09 billion)
- Average annual precipitation: 786.8 mm
- Per Capita Income (2022-23): ₹494,033 (US$6,285.05)
- Website: hyderabad.telangana.gov.in

Hyderabad district is a district in the state of Telangana in India that contains a part of the metropolitan area of Hyderabad. It is headed by a district collector who is drawn from the IAS cadre and is appointed by the state government. It is the smallest of all the districts in the state, but has the highest population density. Old MCH area, which is central region of Hyderabad city comes under this district. The district shares boundaries with Ranga Reddy and Medchal districts.

== History ==
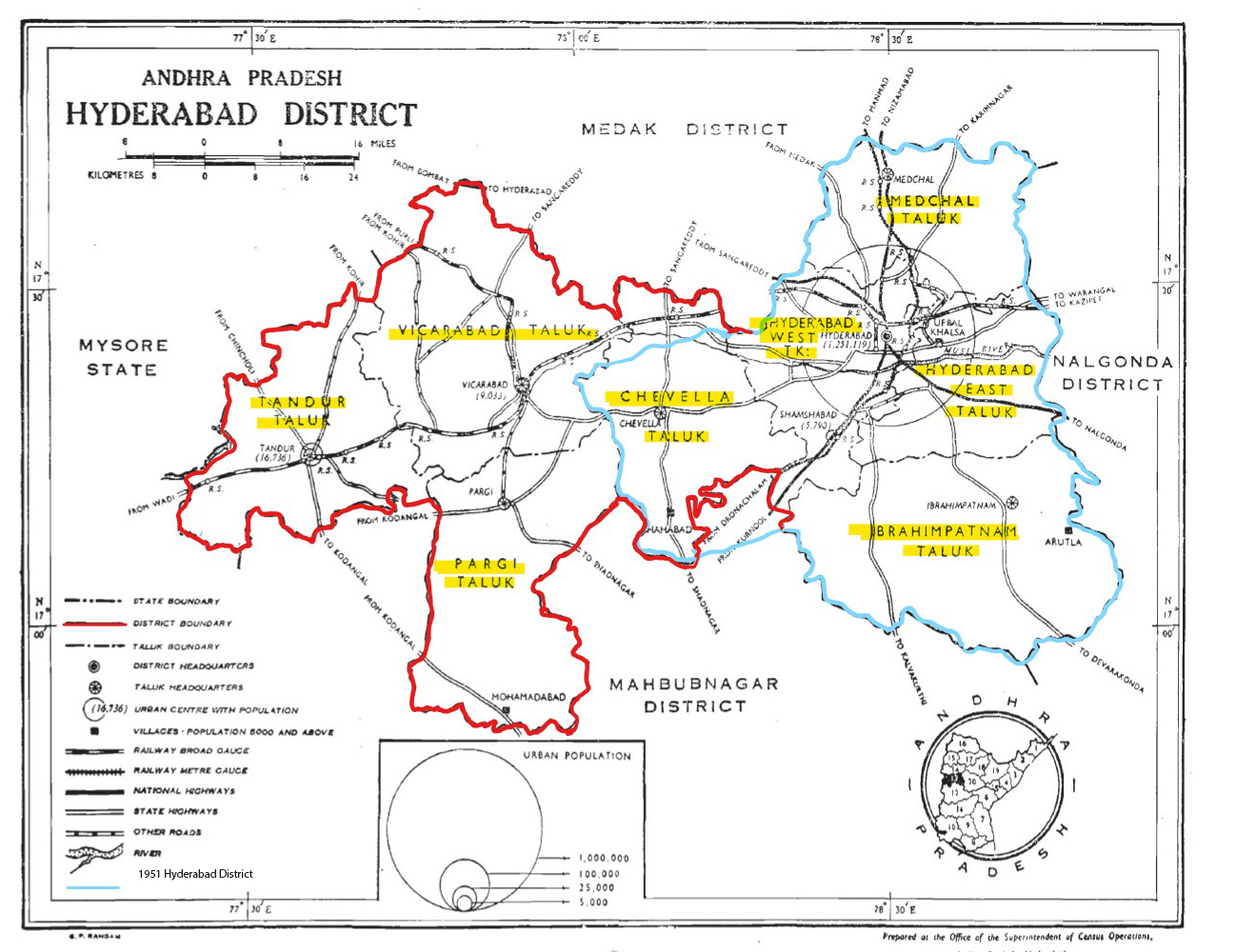
Hyderabad District before and after 1956 with Taluks

Hyderabad district was formed in 1948 after Operation Polo by merging Atraf-a-Balda District and Baghat District. Baghat was previously a Taluk in Atraf-e-Balda District, and was made a separate district in 1931–34 under the subedar of Medak division. After formation of Andhra Pradesh by merging Telugu speaking of Hyderabad state in 1956 Hyderabad district boundary was altered Tandur Taluka which is Telugu speaking region of Gulbarga district was merged in Hyderabad district and Parigi Taluka of Mahabubnagar district and Vikarabad Taluka of Medak District also merged in Hyderabad district. In 1978 Hyderabad district was later split into Hyderabad Urban District and Hyderabad Rural District. Hyderabad Urban District was made by 4 Talukas are Charminar, Golkonda, Mushirabad and Secunderabad Talukas. Hyderabad rural district was later renamed as Ranga Reddy District. Hyderabad Urban district subdivided in 16 Mandals in 1985 and consist of 2 Revenue division

== Administrative divisions ==
Hyderabad District includes the area of the core area Greater Hyderabad Municipal Corporation, Secunderabad Cantonment, and Osmania University. There are 16 administrative areas called mandals (or tehsils) in Hyderabad. They are:

#	Hyderabad revenue division	#	Secunderabad revenue division
1	Amberpet	10	Ameerpet
2	Asifnagar	11	Khairtabad
3	Bahadurpura	12	Marredpally
4	Bandlaguda	13	Musheerabad
5	Charminar	14	Tirumalagiri
6	Golconda	15	Secunderabad
7	Himayatnagar	16	Shaikpet
8	Nampally		
9	Saidabad		

Hyderabad district comprises 15 Assembly constituencies in the core of the Greater Hyderabad Municipal Corporation.

== Geography ==
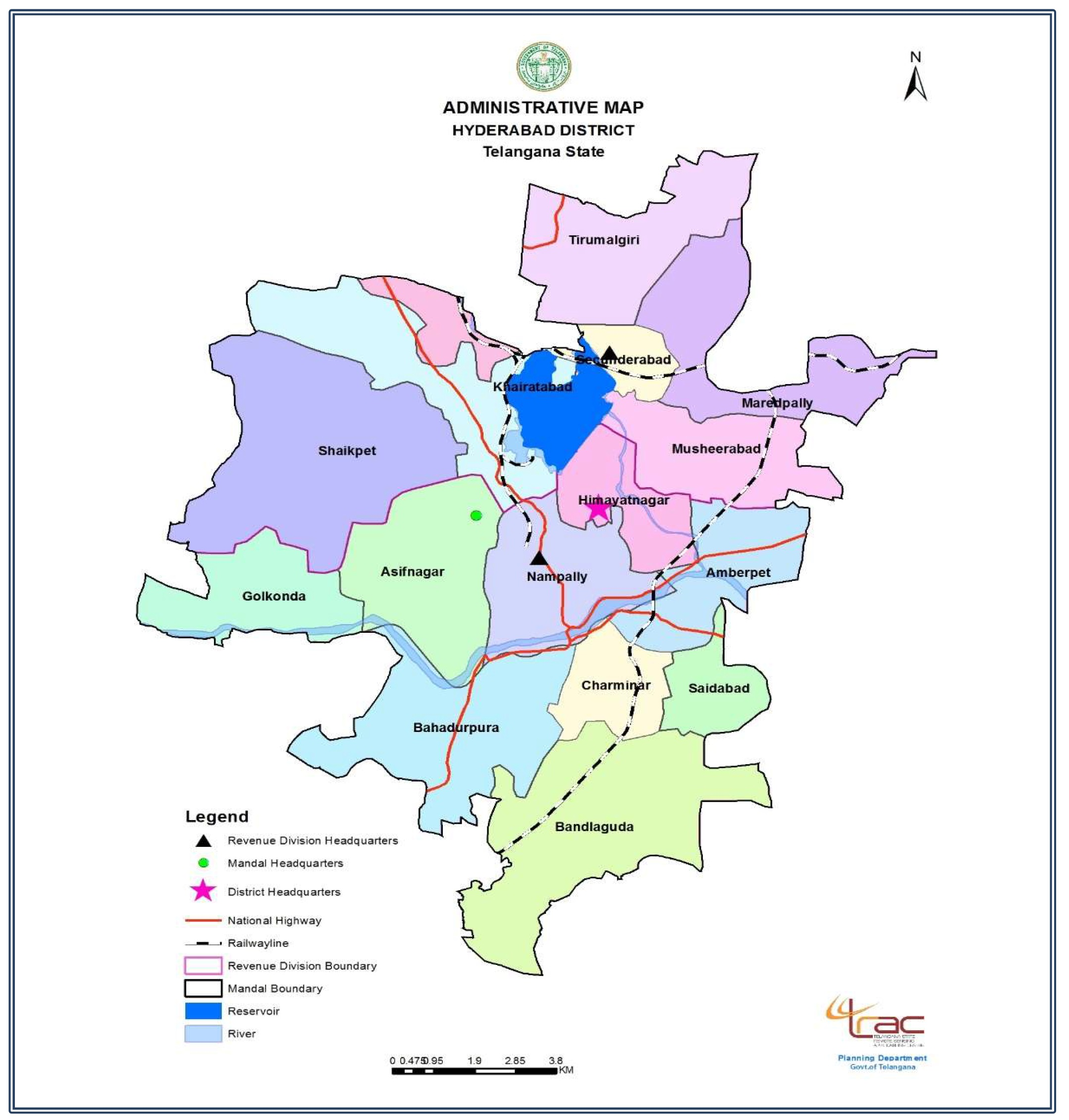
Hyderabad District

Hyderabad district occupies an area of approximately 217 square kilometres (84 sq mi).

== Demographics ==
Historical population
Year	Pop.	±% p.a.
1901	499,082	—
1911	627,720	+2.32%
1921	556,913	−1.19%
1931	588,217	+0.55%
1941	810,790	+3.26%
1951	1,083,634	+2.94%
1961	1,191,668	+0.95%
1971	1,682,284	+3.51%
1981	2,251,009	+2.96%
1991	3,145,939	+3.40%
2001	3,829,753	+1.99%
2011	3,943,323	+0.29%

In the 2011 census Hyderabad district's population was 3,943,323, with a religious make-up of: Hindus (53.45%), Muslims (43.07%), Christians (2.22%), Jains (0.5%), Sikhs (0.29%) and Buddhists (0.03%); 1.40% did not state any religion. This gives it a ranking of 57th in India (out of a total of 640). The district has a population density of 18,480 inhabitants per square kilometre (47,900/sq mi) . Its population growth rate over the decade 2001–2011 was 4.71%. Hyderabad has a sex ratio of 943 females for every 1000 males, and a literacy rate of 80.96%.

Religions in Hyderabad district (2011)
Religion	Percent
Hinduism	53.45%
Islam	43.07%
Christianity	2.22%
Other or not stated	1.40%

Mandal	Hindu	Muslim	Other
Asif Nagar	195,068	233,109	14,068
Golconda	71,624	133,617	8,118
Bahadurpura	82,504	375,729	9,925
Bandlaguda	106,806	214,702	8,685
Charminar	21,939	211,683	3,972
Saidabad	162,289	174,555	8,878
Amberpet	117,554	31,310	4,694
Himayathnagar	80,177	18,808	9,077
Nampally	134,578	38,918	15,883
Secunderabad	102,147	21,552	11,671
Ameerpet	51,069	3,625	4,376
Shaikpet	167831	71,461	11,600
Tirumalagiri	171,688	26,556	19,666
Marredpally	134,439	20,238	17,865
Musheerabad	261,404	67,376	19,081
Khairatabad	184,934	70,166	16,285

Percent Muslim from 1981-2011
Year	Percent
1981	35.91
1991	39.35
2001	41.17
2011	43.45

=== Language ===
Languages of Hyderabad District (2011)
1. Telugu 46.35 (45.9%)
2. Urdu 43.24 (42.8%)
3. Hindi 5.38 (5.33%)
4. Marathi 1.73 (1.71%)
5. Kannada 1.15 (1.14%)
6. Others 3.15 (3.12%)

== Climate ==
Climate data for Hyderabad (1991–2020 normals, extremes 1951–2020)
Month	Jan	Feb	Mar	Apr	May	Jun	Jul	Aug	Sep	Oct	Nov	Dec	Year
Record high °C (°F)	35.9 (96.6)	39.1 (102.4)	42.2 (108.0)	43.3 (109.9)	44.5 (112.1)	45.5 (113.9)	38.0 (100.4)	37.6 (99.7)	36.5 (97.7)	36.7 (98.1)	34.0 (93.2)	35.0 (95.0)	45.5 (113.9)
Mean daily maximum °C (°F)	28.6 (83.5)	31.8 (89.2)	35.2 (95.4)	37.6 (99.7)	38.8 (101.8)	34.4 (93.9)	30.5 (86.9)	29.6 (85.3)	30.1 (86.2)	30.4 (86.7)	28.8 (83.8)	27.8 (82.0)	32.0 (89.5)
Daily mean °C (°F)	22.8 (73.0)	25.4 (77.7)	28.8 (83.8)	31.4 (88.5)	33.2 (91.8)	29.7 (85.5)	27.2 (81.0)	26.4 (79.5)	26.8 (80.2)	26.2 (79.2)	24.1 (75.4)	22.2 (72.0)	27.0 (80.6)
Mean daily minimum °C (°F)	13.9 (57.0)	15.5 (59.9)	20.3 (68.5)	24.1 (75.4)	26.0 (78.8)	23.9 (75.0)	22.5 (72.5)	22.0 (71.6)	21.7 (71.1)	20.0 (68.0)	16.4 (61.5)	13.1 (55.6)	20.0 (67.9)
Record low °C (°F)	6.1 (43.0)	8.9 (48.0)	13.2 (55.8)	16.0 (60.8)	16.7 (62.1)	17.8 (64.0)	18.6 (65.5)	18.7 (65.7)	17.8 (64.0)	11.7 (53.1)	7.4 (45.3)	7.1 (44.8)	6.1 (43.0)
Average rainfall mm (inches)	9.2 (0.36)	10.2 (0.40)	12.3 (0.48)	27.2 (1.07)	34.5 (1.36)	113.8 (4.48)	162.0 (6.38)	203.9 (8.03)	148.5 (5.85)	113.9 (4.48)	19.1 (0.75)	5.0 (0.20)	859.6 (33.84)
Average precipitation days (≥ 0.3 mm)	1.1	1	1.4	3.7	4.2	10.9	15.4	16.3	12.3	7.6	2.5	0.5	76.9
Average rainy days	0.6	0.6	0.9	2.0	2.5	6.8	9.5	11.3	8.4	5.6	1.3	0.3	49.8
Average relative humidity (%) (at 17:30 IST)	41	33	29	30	31	52	65	70	67	59	49	44	48
Average dew point °C (°F)	12 (54)	12 (54)	13 (55)	15 (59)	15 (59)	19 (66)	20 (68)	20 (68)	20 (68)	17 (63)	15 (59)	13 (55)	16 (61)
Mean monthly sunshine hours	272.8	265.6	272.8	276.0	279.0	180.0	136.4	133.3	162.0	226.3	243.0	251.1	2,698.3
Mean daily sunshine hours	8.8	9.4	8.8	9.2	9.0	6.0	4.4	4.3	5.4	7.3	8.1	8.1	7.4
Average ultraviolet index	9	11	12	12	12	12	12	12	12	11	9	8	11
Source 1: India Meteorological Department (sun 1971–2000) Time and Date (dewpoints, 2005–2015)
Source 2: Tokyo Climate Center (mean temperatures 1991–2020) Weather Atlas

== Government ==
The collectorate administers the district on behalf of the state government. The Hyderabad District does not have elected officials at the district level due to the absence of a Zilla Parishad (District Legislature) although it has representations at the state (MLA) and Union level legislature (MP). In addition the entire district is contained within the jurisdiction of the GHMC, the city administration. Representatives are popularly elected to various wards of GHMC.
