= Nampally, Hyderabad =

Nampally Nampalli
- neighborhood
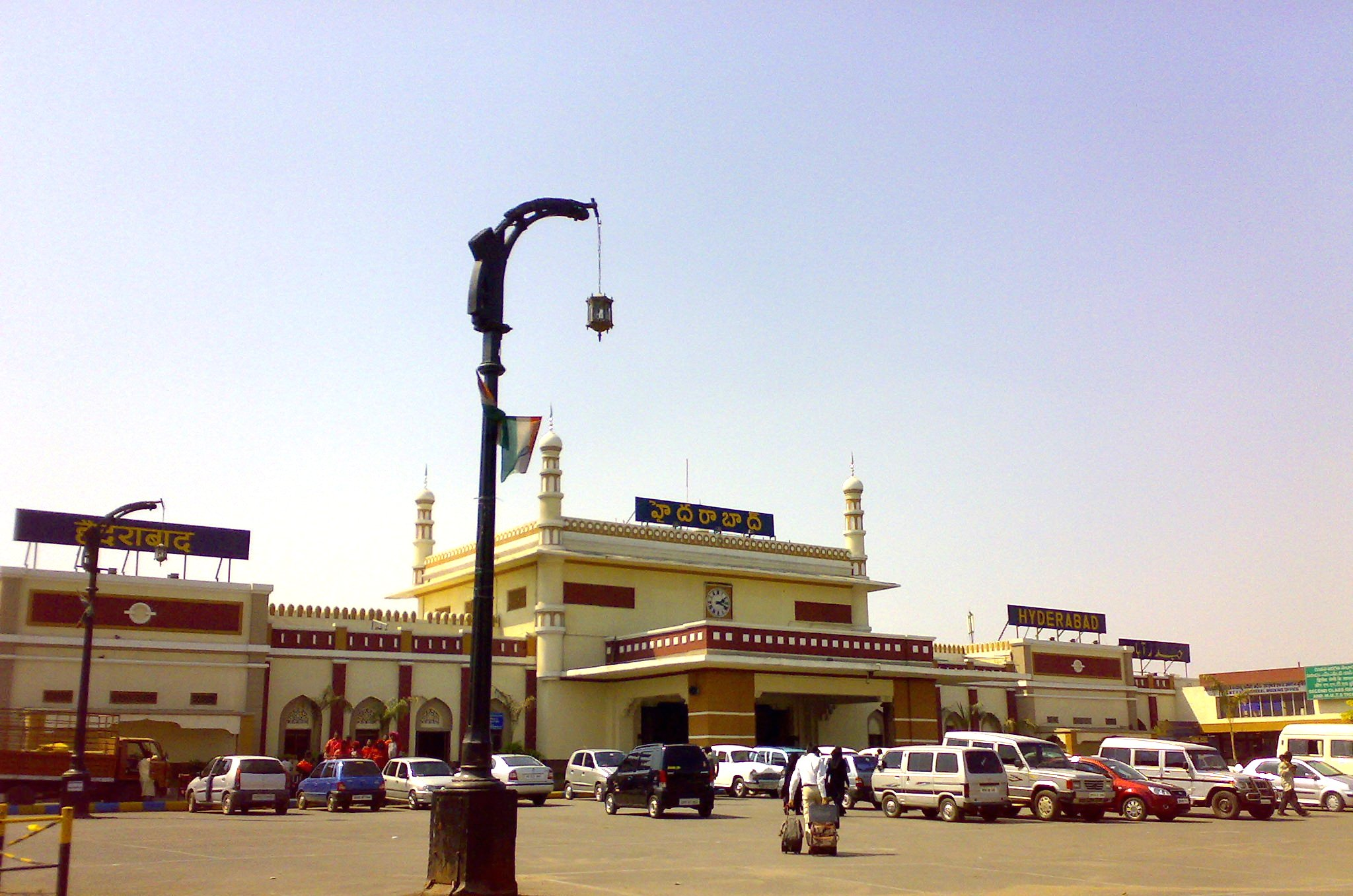
- Nampally Railway station

- Location in Hyderabad, India Nampally (India)
- Coordinates: 17.4367°N 78.4674°E
- Country: India
- State: Telangana
- District: Hyderabad District
- Metro: Hyderabad Metropolitan Region

Government
  - Body: GHMC

Population (2015)
  - neighborhood: 150,000
  - Metro: 300,000

Languages
  - Official: Telugu, Urdu
- Time zone: UTC+5:30 (IST)
- PIN: 500 001
- Vehicle registration: TG
- Lok Sabha constituency: Hyderabad
- Vidhan Sabha constituency: Nampally Assembly constituency
- Planning agency: GHMC
- Website: telangana.gov.in

Nampally is one of the biggest and busiest neighbourhoods in Hyderabad, Telangana, India. It is also a mandal in Hyderabad district. The biggest landmarks are Ibrahim House and Hyderabad Deccan railway station, locally known as the Nampally Railway Station.

== History ==
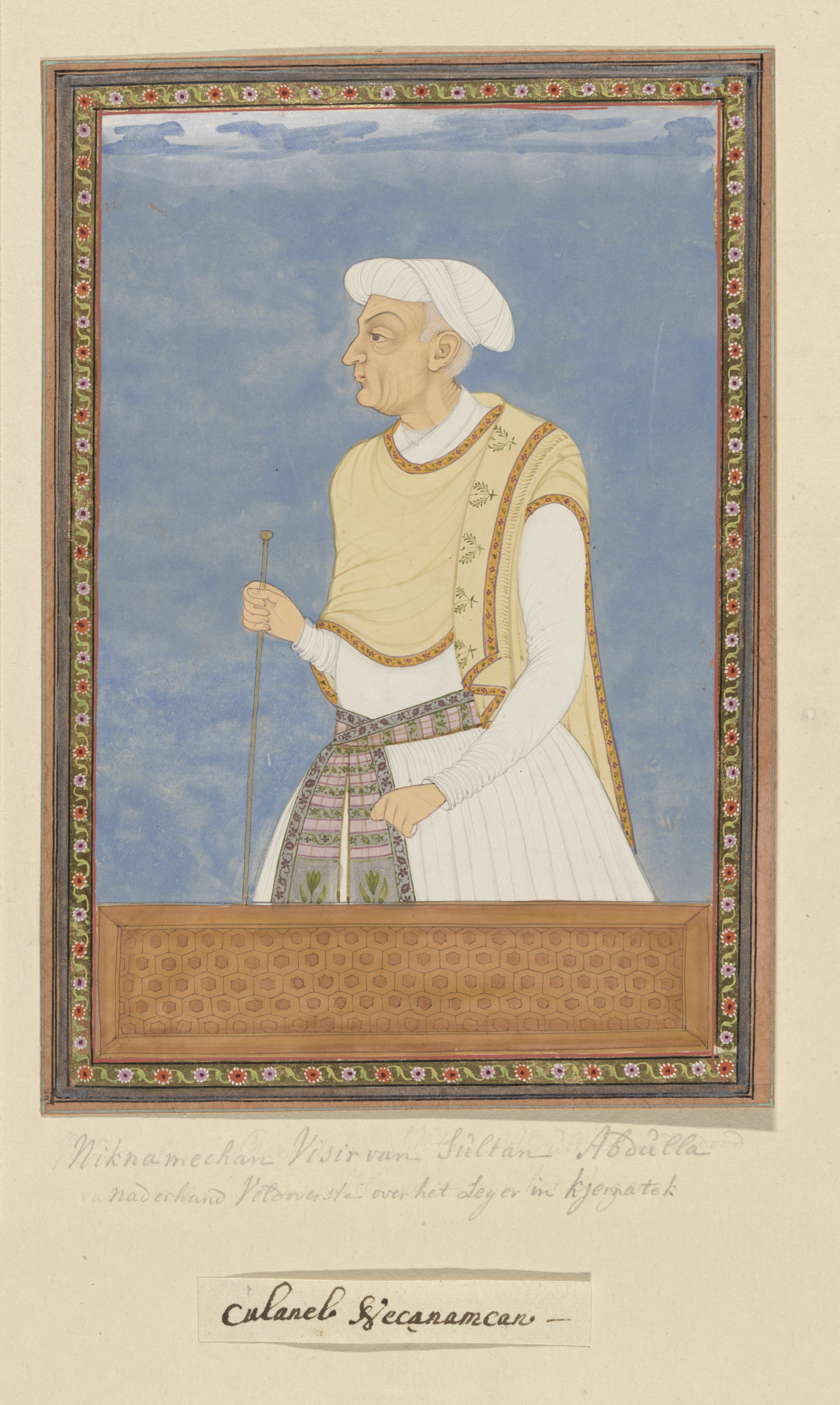
Portrait of Nekh-Nam-Khan

Nampally derives its name from a Diwan of Hyderabad, Raza Ali Khan, whose title was Nekh-Nam-Khan. A jagir was granted to him, Nekh-Nampally, which became ‘Nampally’. The Nampally Railway Station was built in 1907 by Osman Ali Khan, Asaf Jah VII, the last Nizam of Hyderabad state.

The Hyderabad Railway Station,jai Ashok popularly known as "Nampally Station", was used mostly as goods siding while the Secunderabad Railway Station (built in 1874) saw its first train on 9 October 1874 when the Wadi-Secunderabad line was commissioned by the Nizam's Guaranteed State Railway. The Hyderabad Railway Station had to wait till 1921 before the first passenger train came chugging in. The delay was because as the Begumpet Railway Station was being constructed, it was discovered that the railway line passed through the property of Viqar-ul-Umra and it was only when he insisted that the trains stop at Begumpet, did he grant permission for full construction of the Begumpet Railway Station. Once that issue was resolved, trains began plying between Secunderabad and Hyderabad - passing through either the Hussain Sagar Junction or Begumpet Railway Station.

Today, it is one of the busiest Railway Stations with many Express and Super fast trains terminating or originating from here that include the legendary Telangana Express - the first Super fast train of South Central Railways that runs between Hyderabad and New Delhi - and the Hyderabad–Visakhapatnam Godavari Express and Hussainsagar Express trains.

== Landmarks ==
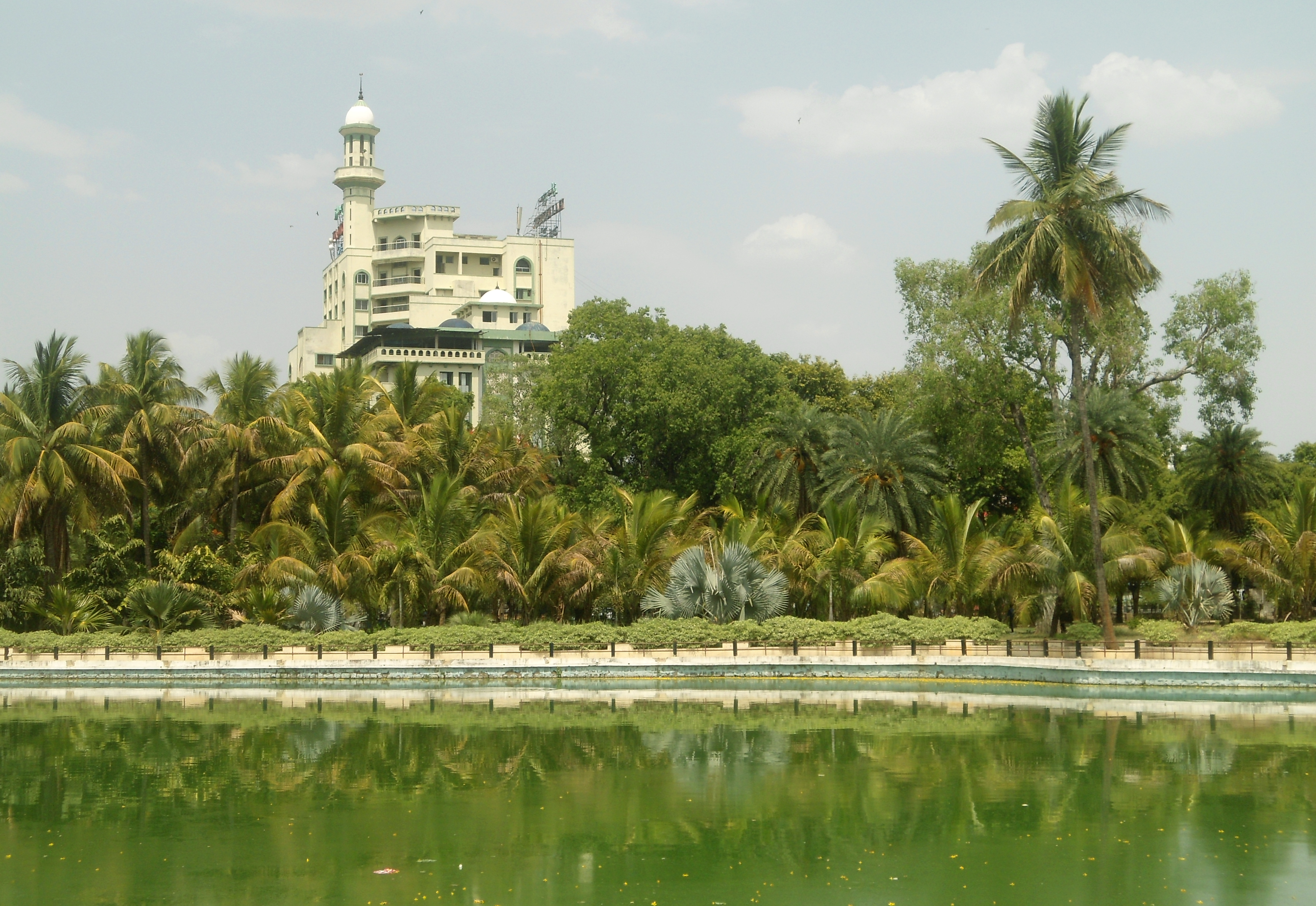
Haj House view from Public Gardens at Nampally in Hyderabad

- Dargah Yousufain
- Telangana State Archaeology Museum has antiques dating back to the Nizam period, including an Egyptian mummy
- Public Gardens, a recreational spot
- Telangana Legislative Assembly
- Telangana Legislative Council
- Moazzam Jahi Market
- Centre for DNA Fingerprinting and Diagnostics
- Jubilee Hall
- Numaish, Exhibition Grounds
- Nampally Sarai
- Abids
- Telangana Board of Intermediate Education

== Transport ==
Nampally is well connected by road and rail. It is connected by Nampally Metro Station of Hyderabad Metro. Buses run by TSRTC provide connectivity from and to this place. Nampally Railway Station, now known as Hyderabad Station, is Hyderabad's main railway station providing connectivity to various parts of the state and country. MMTS train runs the local city train service from the Nampally railway station providing connectivity to important parts of the city. Autos, taxis and seven seaters all provide a means of transport to different parts of the city.
