= Masab Tank =

- suburb
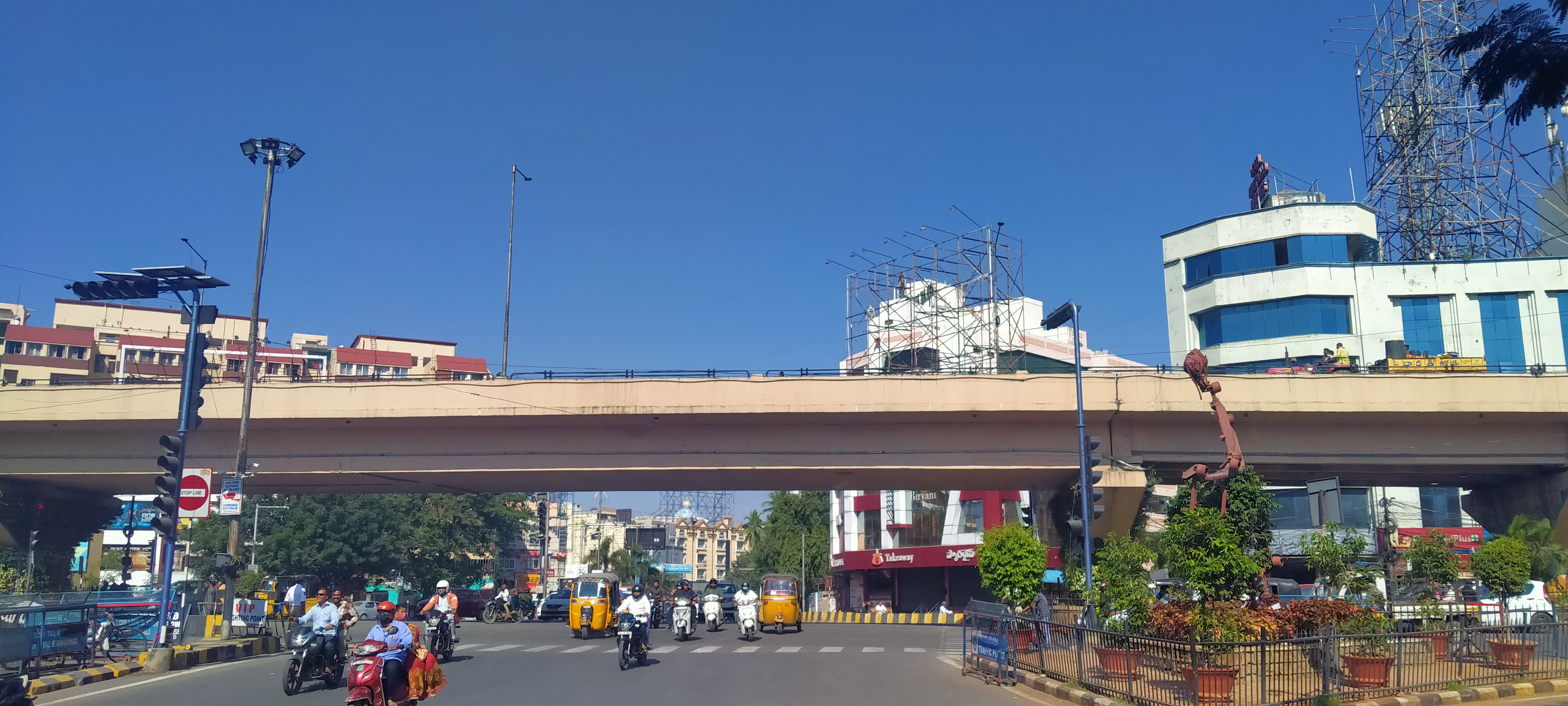
- Masab Tank Flyover

- Location in Hyderabad, India
- Coordinates: 17.401°N 78.456°E
- Country: India
- State: Telangana
- District: Hyderabad
- Metro: Hyderabad

Government
  - Body: GHMC

Languages
  - Official: Telugu, Urdu
- Time zone: UTC+5:30 (IST)
- PIN: 500 028
- Lok Sabha constituency: Hyderabad
- Vidhan Sabha constituency: Nampally
- Planning agency: GHMC

Masab Tank is a major locality in Hyderabad, India. The area lies at the junction of Road#1, Banjara Hills and the road connecting Humayun Nagar and Lakdi Ka Pul.

== History ==
Masab Tank is derived from Maa Sahiba Tank. The tank was built in 1624 by Khanum Agha, the mother of Qutub Shah V. The tank later came to be known as Maa Sahiba Talab. Maa Sahiba was a title endowed on Hayat Bakshi Begum, wife of Qutub Shahi VI. It is said that when the lake was built, on October 4, 1624 CE, the royal family had prayed to keep the lake filled with fresh water “till the Day of Resurrection“. Due to encroachment and rapid urbanisation, the lake has almost disappeared. Gradually over time, the lake bed has been converted to residential and commercial areas.

== Transport ==
TSRTC runs the buses connecting it to all parts of the city.

The closest MMTS Train station is at Lakdi Ka Pul.
