= Karwan =

- Neighbourhood
- Location in Telangana, India Karwan (Telangana) Karwan (India)
- Coordinates: 17°22′28″N 78°26′30″E
- Country: India
- State: Telangana
- District: Hyderabad
- Metro: Hyderabad

Government
  - Body: GHMC

Languages
  - Official: Telugu
- Time zone: UTC+5:30 (IST)
- PIN: 500 006
- Vehicle registration: TG
- Lok Sabha constituency: Hyderabad
- Vidhan Sabha constituency: Karwan
- Planning agency: GHMC
- Website: telangana.gov.in

Karwan is one of the major neighbourhoods in Hyderabad, Telangana, India. It is a part of the old city of Hyderabad.
