= Hyderabad Lok Sabha constituency =

Lok Sabha Constituency in State of Telangana

Coordinates: 17.4°N 78.4°E

Hyderabad TG-9
- Lok Sabha constituency

Constituency details
- Country: India
- Region: South India
- State: Telangana
- Assembly constituencies: Malakpet; Karwan; Goshamahal; Charminar; Chandrayangutta; Yakutpura; Bahadurpura
- Established: 1951
- Total electors: 22,17,094
- Reservation: None

Member of Parliament
- 18th Lok Sabha
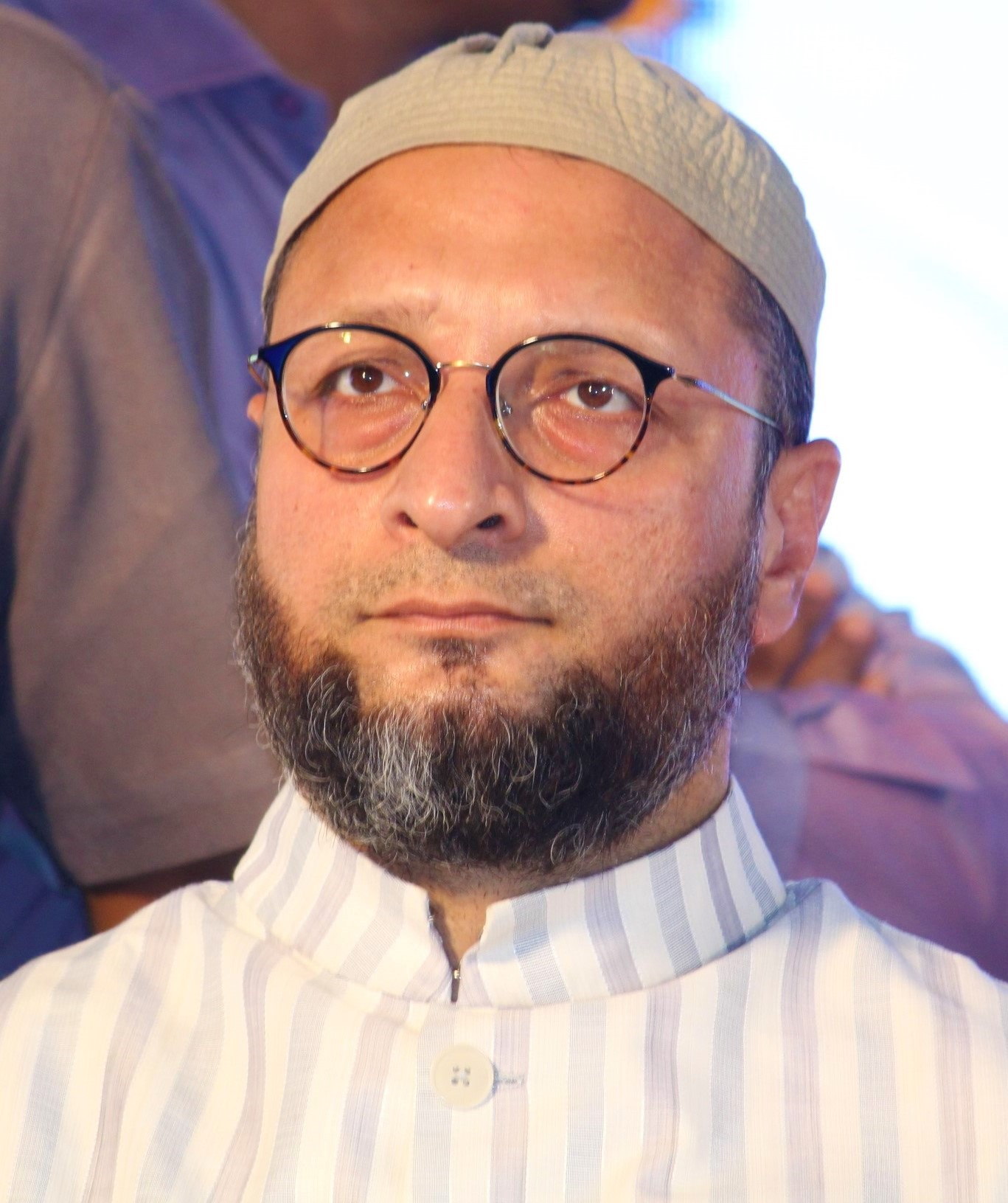
- Incumbent Asaduddin Owaisi
- Party: AIMIM
- Alliance: None
- Elected year: 2024
- Preceded by: Sultan Salahuddin Owaisi

Hyderabad Lok Sabha constituency is one of the seventeen (17) Lok Sabha (Lower House of the Parliament) constituencies in Telangana state in southern India. Delimitation of Hyderabad Lok Sabha Constituency took place in 2008. Apart from Hyderabad constituency, there are four other Lok Sabha constituencies in and around capital city of Hyderabad -Malkajgiri, Secunderabad, Chevella and Medak.

All India Majlis-e-Ittehadul Muslimeen is Most successful political party in Hyderabad (Telangana) Lok Sabha elections
1. AIMIM (10 terms) (55.5%)
2. INC (5 terms) (27.8%)
3. TPS (1 term) (5.56%)
4. INC (I) (1 term) (5.56%)
5. Independent (1 terms) (5.56%)

== Assembly segments ==
No	Name	District	Member	Party	Leading (in 2024)
58	Malakpet	Hyderabad	Ahmed Bin Abdullah Balala	AIMIM	AIMIM
64	Karwan	Hyderabad	Kausar Mohiuddin	AIMIM	AIMIM
65	Goshamahal	Hyderabad	T. Raja Singh	IND	BJP
66	Charminar	Hyderabad	Mir Zulfeqar Ali	AIMIM	AIMIM
67	Chandrayangutta	Hyderabad	Akbaruddin Owaisi	AIMIM	AIMIM
68	Yakutpura	Hyderabad	Jaffer Hussain Mehraj	AIMIM	AIMIM
69	Bahadurpura	Hyderabad	Mohammed Mubeen	AIMIM	AIMIM

=== Hyderabad Lok Sabha constituency Delimitation History ===
Following Assembly constituencies were included in Hyderabad constituency during delimitation every time.

S.No	Delimitation implemented Year	Assembly constituencies Included
1	1952	Mushirabad, Somajiguda, Chadarghat, Begum Bazar, Shalibanda, Karwan, Hyderabad city.
2	1957	Sultan Bazar, Begum Bazar, Asifnagar, High court, Malakpet, Yakatpura, Phattargatti.
3	1962	Sultan Bazar, Begum Bazar, Asifnagar, High court, Malakpet, Yakatpura, Phattargatti.
4	1967	Tandur, Vikarabad, Chevella, Sitarambagh, Malakpet, Yakutpura, Charminar.
5	1977	Tandur, Vikarabad, Chevella, Karwan, Malakpet, Yakutpura, Charminar.
6	2009	Malakpet, Karwan, Goshamahal, Charminar, Chandrayangutta, Yakutpura, Bahadurpura.

== Members of Parliament ==
Year	Member	Party
Hyderabad State
1952	Ahmed Mohiuddin	Indian National Congress
Andhra Pradesh
1957	Vinayak Rao Koratkar	Indian National Congress
1962	Gopaliah Subbukrishna Melkote	Indian National Congress
1967	Gopaliah Subbukrishna Melkote	Indian National Congress
1971	Gopaliah Subbukrishna Melkote	Telangana Praja Samithi
1977	K. S. Narayana	Indian National Congress
1980	K. S. Narayana	Indian National Congress (I)
1984	Sultan Salahuddin Owaisi	Independent
1989	Sultan Salahuddin Owaisi	All India Majlis-e-Ittehadul Muslimeen
1991	Sultan Salahuddin Owaisi	All India Majlis-e-Ittehadul Muslimeen
1996	Sultan Salahuddin Owaisi	All India Majlis-e-Ittehadul Muslimeen
1998	Sultan Salahuddin Owaisi	All India Majlis-e-Ittehadul Muslimeen
1999	Sultan Salahuddin Owaisi	All India Majlis-e-Ittehadul Muslimeen
2004	Asaduddin Owaisi	All India Majlis-e-Ittehadul Muslimeen
2009	Asaduddin Owaisi	All India Majlis-e-Ittehadul Muslimeen
Telangana
2014	Asaduddin Owaisi	All India Majlis-e-Ittehadul Muslimeen
2019	Asaduddin Owaisi	All India Majlis-e-Ittehadul Muslimeen
2024	Asaduddin Owaisi	All India Majlis-e-Ittehadul Muslimeen

== Election results ==
Vote share of Winning candidates
2024	61.28%
2019	58.95%
2014	52.90%
2009	42.14%
2004	38.39%
1999	41.36%
1998	44.65%
1996	34.57%
1991	46.18%
1989	45.91%
1984	38.13%
1980	39.24%
1977	46.00%
1971	57.27%
1967	45.23%
1962	56.19%
1957	66.16%
1952	47.41%

=== 2024 ===
2024 Indian general election: Hyderabad
Party	Candidate	Votes	%	±%
AIMIM	Asaduddin Owaisi	661,981	61.28	▲2.33
BJP	Madhavi Latha Kompella	323,894	29.98	▲3.18
INC	Mohd Waliullah Sameer	62,962	5.83	▲0.14
BRS	Srinivas Yadav Gaddam	18,641	1.73	▼5.47
NOTA	None of the above	2,906	0.27	▼0.37
IND	7 Independent Candidates	1,078	0.10	
OTH	19 Other Party Candidates	8,862	0.82	
Majority		338,087	31.29	▼0.86
Turnout		1,080,324	48.72	▲3.88
AIMIM hold		Swing		

=== 2019 ===
2019 Indian general election: Hyderabad
Party	Candidate	Votes	%	±%
AIMIM	Asaduddin Owaisi	517,471	58.95	▲6.05
BJP	Dr. Bhagavanth Rao	235,285	26.80	▼5.26
TRS	Pusthe Srikanth	63,239	7.20	▲3.37
INC	Md. Feroz Khan	49,944	5.69	▲0.61
NOTA	None of the above	5,653	0.64	▲0.12
IND	9 Independent Candidates	5,173	0.59	
OTH	2 Other Party Candidates	1,107	0.13	
Majority		282,186	32.15	▲11.31
Turnout		877,872	44.84	▼8.46
AIMIM hold		Swing		

=== 2014 ===
2014 Indian general election: Hyderabad
Party	Candidate	Votes	%	±%
AIMIM	Asaduddin Owaisi	513,868	52.90	▲10.76
BJP	Dr. Bhagavanth Rao	311,414	32.06	▲21.73
INC	S. Krishna Reddy	49,310	5.08	▼7.77
TRS	Rashid Shareef	37,195	3.83	
PPOI	Binghi Rajashekar	21,796	2.24	▲0.45
YSRCP	Boddu Sainath Reddy	10,743	1.11	
AAP	Lubna Sarwath	6,118	0.63	
NOTA	None of the above	5,013	0.52	
BSP	P. Venu Gopal	3,100	0.32	
MBT	Syed Mustafa Mahmood	2,102	0.22	
IND	4 Independent Candidates	8,086	0.83	
OTH	3 Other Party Candidates	2,676	0.28	
Majority		202,454	20.84	▲5.26
Turnout		971,770	53.30	▲0.83
AIMIM hold		Swing		

=== 2009 ===
2009 Indian general election: Hyderabad
Party	Candidate	Votes	%	±%
AIMIM	Asaduddin Owaisi	308,061	42.14	▲3.75
TDP	Zahid Ali Khan	194,196	26.56	
INC	P. Laxman Rao Goud	93,917	12.85	▼12.44
BJP	Satish Agarwal	75,503	10.33	▼17.92
PRP	A. Fatima	24,433	3.34	
PPOI	P. Venkateswara Rao	13,085	1.79	▲1.36
IND	14 Independent Candidates	16,431	2.25	
OTH	3 Other Party Candidates	5,482	0.75	
Majority		113,865	15.58	▲5.44
Turnout		731,108	52.47	▼3.26
AIMIM hold		Swing		

=== 2004 ===
2004 Indian general election: Hyderabad
Party	Candidate	Votes	%	±%
AIMIM	Asaduddin Owaisi	378,854	38.39	▼2.97
BJP	G. Subash Chanderji	278,709	28.25	▼7.49
INC	Konda Lakshma Reddy	249,516	25.29	▲6.78
MBT	Majeedullah Khan	47,560	4.82	
BSP	G. Shobha Rani	11,068	1.12	
PPOI	Varsha Dhawan	4,199	0.43	
IND	4 Independent Candidates	16,831	1.71	
Majority		100,145	10.14	▲4.53
Turnout		986,737	55.73	▼13.42
AIMIM hold		Swing		

=== 1999 ===
1999 Indian general election: Hyderabad
Party	Candidate	Votes	%	±%
AIMIM	Sultan Salahuddin Owaisi	448,165	41.36	▼3.29
BJP	Baddam Bal Reddy	387,344	35.74	▼2.33
INC	Konda Lakshma Reddy	200,642	18.51	▲9.80
ATDP	Jai Prakash Singh Lodhi	15,074	1.39	
NTDP	Khudratulla Khan	13,041	1.20	
IND	Mir Hadi Ali	11,328	1.05	
IND	Bhagwan Dass	8,084	0.75	
Majority		60,821	5.61	▼0.97
Turnout		1,083,678	69.15	▼4.01
AIMIM hold		Swing		

=== 1998 ===
1998 Indian general election: Hyderabad
Party	Candidate	Votes	%	±%
AIMIM	Sultan Salahuddin Owaisi	485,785	44.65	▲10.08
BJP	Baddam Bal Reddy	414,173	38.07	▲11.39
INC	Kichannagari Laxma Reddy	94,756	8.71	▼2.75
TDP	K. S. Ratnam	76,216	7.00	▲0.72
IND	10 Independent Candidates	10,012	0.93	
OTH	4 Other Party Candidates	7,118	0.65	
Majority		71,612	6.58	▼1.31
Turnout		1,102,649	73.16	▲9.79
AIMIM hold		Swing		

=== 1996 ===
1996 Indian general election: Hyderabad
Party	Candidate	Votes	%	±%
AIMIM	Sultan Salahuddin Owaisi	321,045	34.57	▼11.61
BJP	M. Venkaiah Naidu	247,772	26.68	▼15.49
INC	P. Sudhakar Reddy	106,444	11.46	▲8.06
MBT	Md. Amanullah Khan	77,229	8.32	
NTDP	P. Mahender Reddy	64,968	7.00	
TDP	T. Krishna Reddy	58,287	6.28	▲1.25
IND	40 Independent Candidates	43,591	4.70	
OTH	7 Other Party Candidates	9,368	1.01	
Majority		73,273	7.89	▲3.88
Turnout		949,560	63.37	▼13.75
AIMIM hold		Swing		

=== 1991 ===
1991 Indian general election: Hyderabad
Party	Candidate	Votes	%	±%
AIMIM	Sultan Salahuddin Owaisi	454,823	46.18	▲0.27
BJP	Baddam Bal Reddy	415,299	42.17	
TDP	P. Indra Reddy	49,513	5.03	▼25.74
INC	M. Shivashankar	33,519	3.40	▼18.23
JP	Mohana Chary	1,976	0.20	
BSP	Sarat Chandra Narahari Setty	695	0.07	▼0.10
IND	20 Independent Candidates	29,053	2.96	
Majority		39,524	4.01	▼11.13
Turnout		999,602	77.12	▲5.82
AIMIM hold		Swing		

=== 1989 ===
1989 Indian general election: Hyderabad
Party	Candidate	Votes	%	±%
AIMIM	Sultan Salahuddin Owaisi	403,625	45.91	
TDP	Teegala Krishna Reddy	270,547	30.77	▼6.76
INC	Lakshman Reddy	190,132	21.63	▼0.72
BSP	V. R. V. Sreerama Rao	1,520	0.17	
LKP	S. Ramulu	789	0.09	
IND	8 Independent Candidates	12,574	1.43	
Majority		133,078	15.14	▲14.54
Turnout		911,396	71.30	▼5.46
AIMIM gain from Independent		Swing		

=== 1984 ===
1984 Indian general election: Hyderabad
Party	Candidate	Votes	%	±%
IND	Sultan Salahuddin Owaisi	222,187	38.13	
TDP	K. Prabhakara Reddy	218,706	37.53	
INC	V. Hanumanth Rao	130,272	22.35	▼16.89
IND	M. Yadaiah	3,234	0.55	
IND	Syed Mohd. Pasha Qadri	2,767	0.47	
IND	Raja Ram Shastry	2,339	0.40	
IND	K. Sesha Chary	1,792	0.31	
IND	Narottam Lal Gupta	806	0.14	
IND	Abdul Hakeem	671	0.12	
Majority		3,481	0.60	▼6.82
Turnout		596,666	76.76	▲13.32
Independent gain from INC		Swing		

=== 1980 ===
1980 Indian general election: Hyderabad
Party	Candidate	Votes	%	±%
INC(I)	K. S. Narayana	166,868	39.24	▼6.76
JP	Ale Narendra	135,304	31.82	▲6.31
IND	Mohd. Amanullah Khan	112,132	26.37	
IND	Maladi Venkata Subbamma	6,129	1.44	
INC(U)	J. B. Muthyal Rao	3,966	0.93	
RRP	Rajaram Shastry	839	0.20	▼0.72
Majority		31,564	7.42	▼11.73
Turnout		439,388	63.44	▲3.55
INC(I) hold		Swing		

=== 1977 ===
1977 Indian general election: Hyderabad
Party	Candidate	Votes	%	±%
INC	K. S. Narayana	156,295	46.00	
IND	Sultan Salahuddin Owaisi	91,227	26.85	
BLD	Mir Ahmed Ali Khan	86,689	25.51	
RRP	Raja Ram Shastry	3,138	0.92	
IND	Gummakonda Srinivasa Reddy	2,424	0.71	
Majority		65,068	19.15	▼1.82
Turnout		351,047	59.89	▲10.46
INC gain from TPS		Swing		

=== 1971 ===
1971 Indian general election: Hyderabad
Party	Candidate	Votes	%	±%
TPS	G. S. Melkote	134,941	57.27	
IND	Badr-ud-din Tyabji	85,529	36.30	
IND	Rayasam Venkat Rao	4,324	1.84	
MLP	Mohd. Mahzaruddin	3,126	1.33	
IND	Mir Faiz Ali Shaheen	3,000	1.27	
TEC	Capt. Mohd. Zahiruzzaman Ansari	2,516	1.07	
IND	Abdul Majeed Khan	1,180	0.50	
RPK	S. B. Shah Ali	1,008	0.43	
Majority		49,412	20.97	▲3.15
Turnout		242,830	49.43	▼8.26
TPS gain from INC		Swing		

=== 1967 ===
1967 Indian general election: Hyderabad
Party	Candidate	Votes	%	±%
INC	G. S. Melkote	115,709	45.23	▼10.96
IND	V. R. Rao	70,124	27.41	
IND	A. Hussain	69,968	27.35	
Majority		45,585	17.82	▼7.27
Turnout		264,510	57.69	▲2.07
INC hold		Swing		

=== 1962 ===
1962 Indian general election: Hyderabad
Party	Candidate	Votes	%	±%
INC	Gopal S. Melkote	96,447	56.19	▼9.97
IND	Maulana Abdul Wahed Owaisi	53,378	31.10	
IND	Mir Farkhunda Ali Khan	9,908	5.77	
ABJS	L. V. S. Sarma	6,724	3.92	
IND	B. S. Ratanalikar	5,174	3.01	
Majority		43,069	25.09	▼24.10
Turnout		175,445	55.62	▲14.52
INC hold		Swing		

=== 1957 ===
1957 Indian general election: Hyderabad
Party	Candidate	Votes	%	±%
INC	Vinayak Rao	77,153	66.16	▲18.75
PSP	Kishen Chand	19,666	16.86	
IND	C. Srikishan	19,795	16.97	
Majority		57,358	49.19	▲38.58
Turnout		116,614	41.10	▼1.88
INC hold		Swing		

=== 1952 ===
1951–52 Indian general election: Hyderabad City
Party	Candidate	Votes	%	±%
INC	Ahmed Mohiuddin	70,004	47.41	
PDF	Makhdoom Mohiuddin	54,344	36.80	
IND	Ram Murthy Naidu	11,161	7.56	
Socialist	G. M. Khan	6,290	4.26	
IND	Kishen Chand	2,338	1.58	
IND	Md. Ataur Rahman	1,789	1.21	
IND	B. Ranga Reddy	1,731	1.17	
Majority		15,660	10.61	
Turnout		147,657	42.98	
INC win (new seat)				

== See also ==
- Hyderabad
- Secunderabad Lok Sabha constituency
- List of constituencies of the Lok Sabha
