= Deccan College of Engineering and Technology =

Technical institute at Darussalam, Nampally in Hyderabad, India

- Type: Technical institute
- Established: 1984
- Affiliations: Osmania University
- Chairman: Asaduddin Owaisi
- Director: Dr.Syeda Gauhar Fatima
- Undergraduates: 2500
- Postgraduates: 120
- Location: Hyderabad, Telangana, India; 17.3846°N 78.4649°E
- Campus: Urban, 1.51 acres
- Website: www.deccancollege.ac.in

The Deccan College of Engineering and Technology (DCET) is a technical institute at Darussalam, Nampally in Hyderabad, India. The college is one of the eight Engineering colleges affiliated to Osmania University in Hyderabad.

== History ==
The college was established in 1984 as a self-financing minority institution by the Darussalam Educational Trust chaired by Sultan Salahuddin Owaisi, a prominent politician and Member of Parliament.

== Campus ==
The campus is in the heart of the city at Nampally. The college occupies an area of 66,070 sq ft (6,138 m2) built-in area with adjacent open space of approximate 16 acres (65,000 m2) for further expansion. It also houses the Deccan School of Management, the AIMIM party office, Etemaad Press Office, Deccan School of Pharmacy and the Deccan School of Planning and Architecture which was started in the year 2011 with an annual intake of 80 students.

== Courses offered ==
The institute is consistently ranked among the best in Hyderabad. It offers four-year Bachelor of Engineering (B.E.) degree in the following fields:

- Civil Engineering
- Computer Science and Engineering
- Information Technology
- Electronics and Communication Engineering
- Electrical and Electronics Engineering
- Electronics and Instrumentation Engineering
- Mechanical Engineering
- Mechanical Engineering with specialisation in Production Engineering

For Post Graduation, the institute offers two-year Master of Engineering (M.E.) degree in the following fields:

- Civil Engineering
- Electronics and Communication Engineering with specialization in Digital Systems
- MTech in Computer Science and Engineering

It also offers a three-year Master's programme in Computer Applications (M.C.A.).

== Admissions ==
For admission to the first year of the four-year degree course in Engineering, candidates must fulfill the eligibility requirements as prescribed by the government of Telangana State and Osmania University from time to time. The intake of first year is 620 students from all branches. All admissions are made strictly in accordance with the government rules in force at the time. Since it is a Muslim minority college 75% of the seats are reserved for Muslims who appear and qualify in the state-level Engineering and Medical Common Entrance Test (EAMCET). The remaining 25% seats are filled by the College Management.

Admissions to the three-year Master of Computer Applications is made through the Integrated Common Entrance Test (I-CET).
