= Kausar Mohiuddin =

Indian politician

Kausar Mohiuddin کوثر محی الدین

Member of Telangana Legislative Assembly
- Incumbent
- Assumed office 2014
- Preceded by: Afsar Khan
- Constituency: Karwan

Personal details
- Born: 6 November 1963 (age 62) Baswapur, Veldurthi mandal, Medak District
- Party: All India Majlis-e-Ittehadul Muslimeen
- Spouse: Najma Sultana
- Education: Anwarul Uloom
- Occupation: Politician
- Website: www.aimimkarwan.com

Kausar Mohiuddin is an Indian politician from the state of Telangana. He represents the Karwan seat of the Old City of Hyderabad as a candidate of the All India Majlis-e-Ittehadul Muslimeen party.

== Political career ==
In 2014, Mohiuddin was made a candidate for the Karwan seat for the Assembly election by party chief Asaduddin Owaisi as a replacement for Afsar Khan. Khan was replaced for health reasons. Times of India wrote that Mohiuddin worked at the grassroot level and "worked in close cooperation with the local legislator". In the election, he defeated his nearest rival Baddam Bal Reddy of the Bharatiya Janata Party by 38 thousand votes.

In July 2017, Mohiuddin objected to the demolition of a 30 feet compound wall in Banjara Hills. The Greater Hyderabad Municipal Corporation officials said that the labourers were abused by him. However the area did not fall under his constituency and he intervened after he received a phone call from the property owner. The GHMC officials claimed that the wall was illegally built.

== Personal life ==
Mohiuddin was born in Hyderabad and lives in a joint family which includes his five brothers and his mother. He studied at the Anwarul Uloom College of Mallepally. Mohiuddin also has a hobby of visiting his family's agricultural land in Medak.

Mohiuddin's wife Najma Sultana is a corporator from the same party representing the Nanal Nagar constituency.

== Controversies ==
In March 2017, Mohiuddin was booked for physically assaulting a woman and Muhammad Sharukh, a worker of the Telangana Rashtra Samiti. However, he refuted the allegations and instead said that Sharukh in a drunken state, assaulted his brother.
