= Karwan Assembly constituency =

Constituency of the Telangana legislative assembly in India

Coordinates: 17.378°N 78.437°E

Karwan
- Constituency No. 64 for the Telangana Legislative Assembly
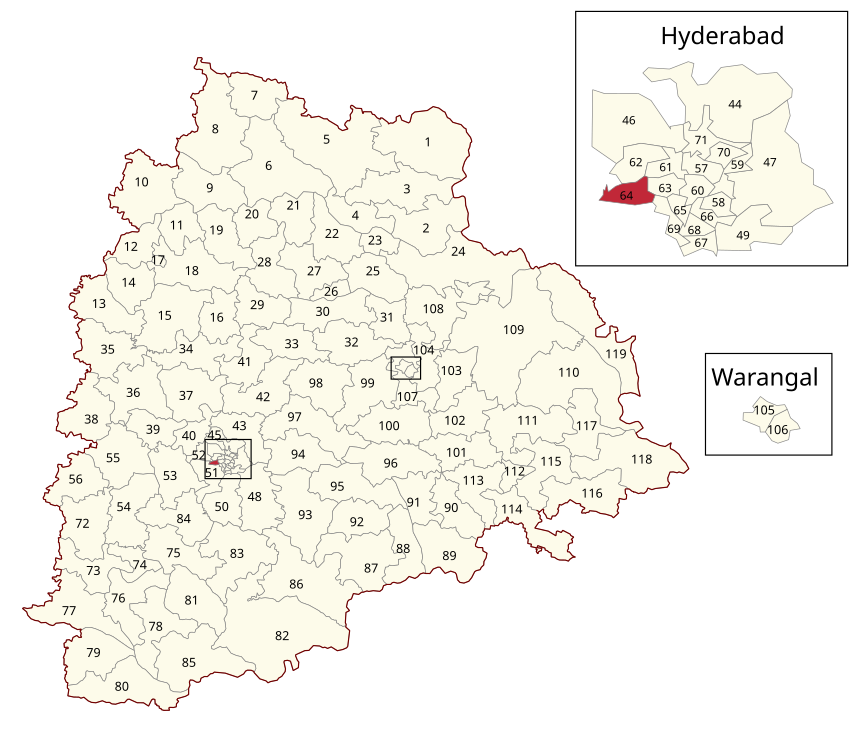
- Location of Karwan Assembly constituency within Telangana

Constituency details
- Country: India
- Region: South India
- State: Telangana
- District: Hyderabad
- Lok Sabha constituency: Hyderabad
- Established: 1951 (75 years ago)
- Total electors: 2,87,626
- Reservation: None

Member of Legislative Assembly
- 3rd Telangana Legislative Assembly
- Incumbent Kausar Mohiuddin
- Party: AIMIM

Karwan Assembly constituency is a constituency of Telangana Legislative Assembly, India. It is one of the 26 constituencies of CURE limits, a strategic zone created by Government of Telangana. It is part of Hyderabad Lok Sabha constituency.

Kausar Mohiuddin of AIMIM is representing the constituency. It is one of the seven Assembly constituencies won by All India Majlis-e-Ittehadul Muslimeen.

== Extent of the constituency ==
The Assembly Constituency presently comprises the following neighbourhoods:

Neighbourhood
Karwan
Tolichowki
MD Lane
Jiyaguda
Bheem Nagar
Langar Houz
Tallagadda
Golconda
Dargah Nagar
Shah Hatim Nagar
Nanal Nagar
Mehdipatnam (part)
Salar Jung Colony
Kakatiya Nagar Colony
Hira Khana
Hakeempet
Badabazar
Resham Bagh
Katora House
Gudimalkapur (part)
Mustaidpura
Badabanda
Sabzimandi
Ghirra (part)

== Members of Legislative Assembly ==
Duration	Member	Political party
Hyderabad State
1952–57	Narendra	Indian National Congress
Andhra Pradesh
1978–83	Shiv Lal	Indian National Congress
1983–85	Baqer Agha	Independent politician
1985–89	Baddam Bal Reddy	Bharatiya Janata Party
1989–94	Baddam Bal Reddy	Bharatiya Janata Party
1994–99	Baddam Bal Reddy	Bharatiya Janata Party
1999–03	Syed Sajjad	All India Majlis-e-Ittehadul Muslimeen
2003–04	Mohd. Muqtada Khan	All India Majlis-e-Ittehadul Muslimeen
2004–09	Mohd. Muqtada Khan	All India Majlis-e-Ittehadul Muslimeen
2009–14	Mohd. Muqtada Khan	All India Majlis-e-Ittehadul Muslimeen
Telangana
2014–18	Kausar Mohiuddin	All India Majlis-e-Ittehadul Muslimeen
2018- 2023	Kausar Mohiuddin	All India Majlis-e-Ittehadul Muslimeen
2023- incumbent	Kausar Mohiuddin	All India Majlis-e-Ittehadul Muslimeen

== Election results ==
=== 2023 ===
2023 Telangana Legislative Assembly election: Karwan
Party	Candidate	Votes	%	±%
AIMIM	Kausar Mohiuddin	83,388	47.42	
BJP	Amar Singh	41,402	23.55	
BRS	Aindala Krishnaiah	29,194	16.60	
INC	Osman Bin Mohammed Al Hajir	18,160	10.33	
NOTA	None of the Above	896	0.51	
Majority		41,986	23.87	
Turnout		1,75,836		
AIMIM hold		Swing		

=== 2018 ===
2018 Telangana Legislative Assembly election: Karwan
Party	Candidate	Votes	%	±%
AIMIM	Kausar Mohiuddin	87,586	52.88	−1.0
BJP	Amar Singh	37,417	22.59	−7.8
TRS	T. Jeevan Singh	24,699	14.91	+8.3
INC	Osman Bin Mohammed Al Hajri	11,231	6.78	+2.7
NOTA	None of the Above	938	0.57	
Majority		50,169	30.5	+6.9
Turnout		1,65,626	52.68	
AIMIM hold		Swing		

=== Telangana Legislative Assembly election, 2014 ===
Telangana Assembly Elections, 2014: Karwan
Party	Candidate	Votes	%	±%
AIMIM	Kausar Mohiuddin	86,391	54.2	
BJP	Baddam Bal Reddy	48,614	30.5	
TRS	T. Jeevan Singh	10,760	6.7	
INC	T. Roop Singh	6,512	4.1	
Majority		37,777	23.6	
Turnout		1,60,129	55.7	
AIMIM hold		Swing		

== See also ==
- Karwan
- List of constituencies of Telangana Legislative Assembly
