= Asaduddin Owaisi =

Indian politician (born 1969)

Barrister Asaduddin Owaisi
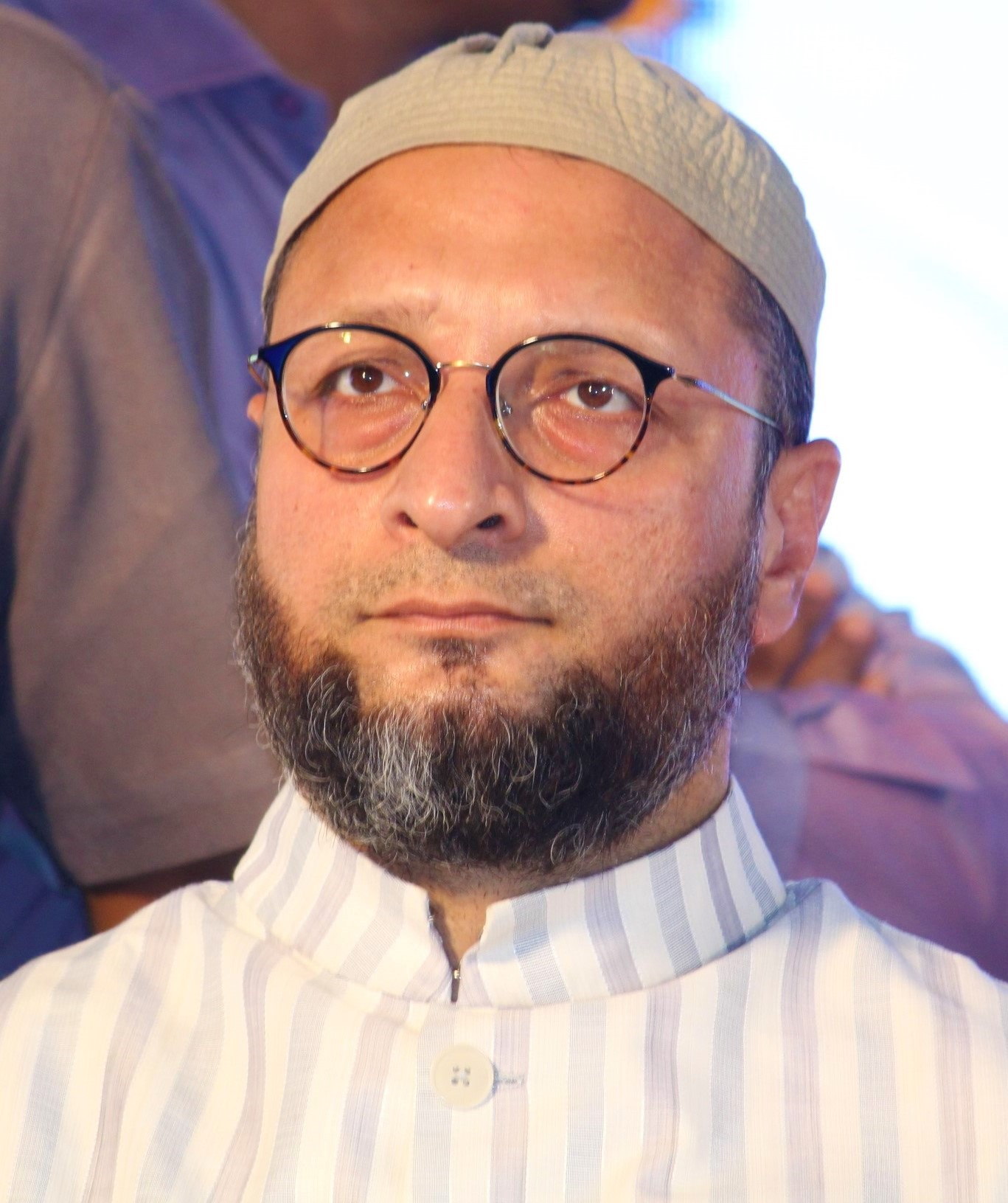
- Owaisi in 2020

3rd President of the All India Majlis-e-Ittehadul Muslimeen
- Incumbent
- Assumed office 29 September 2008
- Preceded by: Sultan Salahuddin Owaisi

Member of Parliament, Lok Sabha
- Incumbent
- Assumed office 17 May 2004
- Preceded by: Sultan Salahuddin Owaisi
- Constituency: Hyderabad

Member of the Andhra Pradesh Legislative Assembly
- In office 1 December 1994 – 26 April 2004
- Preceded by: Virasat Rasool Khan
- Succeeded by: Syed Ahmed Pasha Quadri
- Constituency: Charminar

Personal details
- Born: 13 May 1969 (age 57) Hyderabad, Telangana, India
- Party: All India Majlis-e-Ittehadul Muslimeen
- Spouse: Farheen Owaisi (m. 1996)
- Relations: Akbaruddin Owaisi (brother)
- Children: 6
- Parents: Sultan Salahuddin Owaisi (father); Najamunnisa (mother)
- Education: Osmania University (BA); Lincoln's Inn (Barrister-at-Law)
- Profession: Advocate
- Awards: Sansad Ratna 2014; Excellent MP 2022
- Website: https://www.aimim.org/
- Nicknames: Naqeeb-e-Millat; Qaid; and commonly known as Asad Bhai

Asaduddin Owaisi (born 13 May 1969) is an Indian politician who is serving as the third and current president of the All India Majlis-e-Ittehadul Muslimeen (AIMIM) since 2008. He is a five time Member of Parliament representing the Hyderabad constituency in Lok Sabha, the lower house of the Indian Parliament.

Born to the Owaisi family in Hyderabad, Andhra Pradesh, Asaduddin Owaisi was trained as a barrister at Lincoln's Inn in London, England. He assumed leadership of the AIMIM upon the death of his father Sultan Salahuddin Owaisi in 2008. He has been regularly listed by Royal Islamic Strategic Studies Centre (RISSC), among the 500 Most Influential Muslims of the world.

== Early life and background ==
Owaisi was born to Sultan Salahuddin Owaisi and Najmunnisa Begum on 13 May 1969. He comes from a political family of Hyderabad. His grandfather Abdul Wahed Owaisi relaunched the political party Majlis-e-Ittehadul Muslimeen as All India Majlis-e-Ittehadul Muslimeen 18 September 1957. He also succeeded Qasim Razvi as the party president after he was released from prison. His father Sultan Salahuddin was elected to the Andhra Pradesh Legislative Assembly in 1962. Sultan Salahuddin Owaisi was elected to the Indian Parliament from the Hyderabad constituency for the first time in 1984 and continued winning the elections till 2004, when he stepped down in favour of Asaduddin. He died in 2008.

Owaisi did his schooling from The Hyderabad Public School, Begumpet. He then attended the St Mary's Junior College, Hyderabad before going on to do his graduation in Bachelor of Arts from Nizam College (Osmania University) in Hyderabad. He represented the South Zone inter-university U-25s cricket team as fast bowler in the Vizzy Trophy in 1994 and later got selected in South Zone university team. He is a barrister by profession and studied at Lincoln's Inn in London. His brother Akbaruddin Owaisi is a Member of Telangana Legislative Assembly and heads the party in it. His youngest brother Burhanuddin Owaisi is the editor of Etemaad.

== Personal life ==
Owaisi married Farheen Owaisi on 11 December 1996. The couple has six children which includes five daughters- Khudsia Owaisi, Yasmeen Owaisi, Ameena Owaisi, Maheen Owaisi and Atika Owaisi and one son, Sultanuddin Owaisi (born 2010). His mother is Nazima Begum. He lives in Shastripuram, Mailardevpally, Hyderabad. His eldest daughter Khudsia Owaisi was engaged to Barkat Alam Khan, grandson of Nawab Shah Alam Khan (paternal) and Moinuddin Khan Sandozai (maternal) on 24 March 2018. His second daughter, Yasmeen Owaisi was married to Abid Ali Khan, son of physician Mazharuddin Ali Khan, cousin of Zahid Ali Khan, editor of The Siasat Daily, in September 2020. His third daughter Ameena Owaisi was married to Fahad Beg on 22 December 2022. He is hailed by his supporters as Naqeeb-e-Millat (Leader of the Community). He is fluent in Urdu / Hindi and English. He wears a long sherwani, an Islamic cap and sports a clipped beard.

== Political career ==
Asaduddin is the third national president of the All-India Majlis-e-Ittehadul Muslimeen (AIMIM) Muslim minority rights party in India, previously his father and grandfather.

Asaduddin made his political debut in 1994 in the Andhra Pradesh Legislative Assembly election. Contesting from the Charminar constituency which his party has been winning since 1967, he defeated his nearest rival a breakaway party Majlis Bachao Tehreek's candidate by a margin of 40 thousand votes. He succeeded Virasat Rasool Khan as the elected representative from the constituency. In the 1999 election, he defeated his nearest rival Telugu Desam Party candidate Syed Shah Noorul Haq Quadri by 93 thousand votes. Owaisi was polled 126 thousand votes in the election. In 2004 election, he was succeeded by Syed Ahmed Pasha Quadri as the member of the Assembly from the constituency.

In 2004, Owaisi's father Sultan Salahuddin Owaisi who had been representing the Hyderabad constituency in the Lok Sabha (lower house of Indian parliament) refused to contest further citing poor health. The constituency has 70% Muslim population. He was polled 38% votes compared to his nearest rival Subhas Chanderji's 28%.

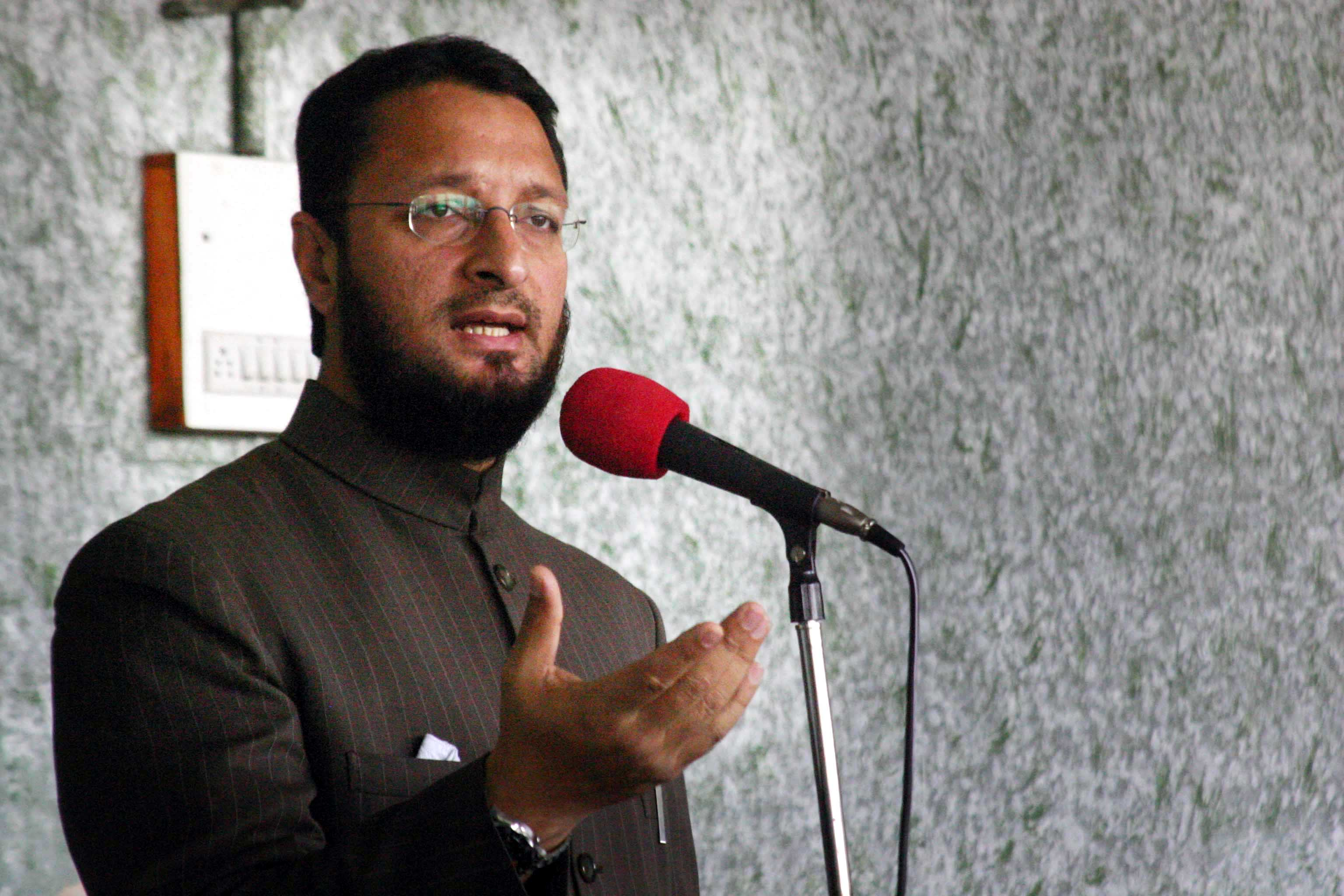
Asaduddin Owaisi in 2006

In 2008, the Left Front (which consisted of Communist Parties) withdrew their support to the central government of India which was led by the United Progressive Alliance. This was done in response to Indo-US nuclear deal signed by Indian Prime Minister Manmohan Singh and US President George W. Bush which allowed India to keep nuclear bombs but in return had to allow international inspection. The Communist parties felt that by this deal, India would become a pawn of the United States. Due to the Left Front withdrawing support, a vote of confidence was held in Indian Parliament. When Uttar Pradesh chief minister Mayawati said that Muslims of India opposed the deal, Owaisi said that it was an attempt to give a communal angle to the deal. Owaisi announced his support for the United Progressive Alliance in the vote of confidence. He said that his top priority was to prevent the opposition right wing Bharatiya Janata Party to ascend to power and to prevent Lal Krishna Advani from becoming the country's Prime Minister. He further stated:

We will express our reservations on the foreign policy impact but at no cost would we like to see the BJP coming in to power, at no cost we would like to see Mr Advani, who is an accused in Babri Masjid demolition case becoming the prime minister of this great nation, thereby destroying the future of Muslims and weakening the secularism.

In the 2009 Indian general election, Zahid Ali Khan, the editor-in-chief of an Urdu daily The Siasat Daily was pitted against Owaisi. He was supported by rival Telugu Desam Party, Telangana Rashtra Samithi, Communist Party of India, Communist Party of India (Marxist). Hindustan Times wrote that the AIMIM party faced "tough challenge" in the Hyderabad constituency. However, Owaisi emerged victorious and defeated Ali Khan by a margin by 110 thousand votes. He increased the winning margin by 10 thousand votes as compared to 2004 election.

Owaisi was awarded the 2014 Sansad Ratna award (Gem of parliamentarians) October 2013 for his performance in the 15th session of Indian parliament. During this period, he asked 1080 questions in the Parliament compared to the national average of 292. His attendance is at 70%.
The Milli Gazette wrote that he "has gained wide respect nationally among Indian Muslims for his bold speeches in Lok Sabha (lower house of Indian parliament)". He took up issues in the Parliament which pertained to the interests of the minority community. Also when he raised the issue of waqf properties in the parliament, the then Rural Development Minister Jairam Ramesh confessed that it was a fault of his ministry in not recognising waqf as a serious matter.

In April 2014, Owaisi filed his nomination for the Hyderabad constituency in the 2014 general election. He declared movable assets worth 2.7 million rupees (around $42,000) and immovable assets worth 30 million rupees (around $463,000). He was elected from the constituency once again by defeating his nearest rival Bharatiya Janata Party's Bhagvanth Rao by a margin of 197 thousand votes.

Owaisi announced that his party AIMIM would contest the 2015 Bihar Legislative Assembly election from mainly from the Muslim dominated area of Seemanchal region of the state. News18 India wrote that the party candidates would divide votes and the voters suspected him of being an agent of the Hindu nationalist Bharatiya Janata Party. He said that he was realistic about their chances of winning. He also said that the Seemanchal region was underdeveloped and he blamed Bihar's Chief Minister Nitish Kumar, Indian National Congress party and Bharatiya Janata Party for it. He said that his aim was to pressurise the government to create a regional developmental council for the region. Although the party contested from six constituencies of Seemanchal region, it failed to win any seat.

Owaisi, who filed his nomination for Hyderabad Lok Sabha constituency for 4th time declared assets worth over Rs 13 crore but claims to own no vehicle.

== Awards ==
=== Sansad Ratna Awardees 2014 ===
Asaduddin, was honored with the Sansad Ratna Award in 2014. In 2014, he was among the three new entrants to receive this prestigious award. Owaisi, along with the other awardees, was invited to Chennai for the award ceremony. His consistent involvement in debates and his active participation in raising important questions have distinguished him as a leading figure among Muslim MPs. This recognition further underscores Owaisi's dedication to effective parliamentary representation.

=== Lokmat Parliamentary Award 2022 ===
Asaduddin, the Hyderabad MP and AIMIM president, was honored with the prestigious 'Best Parliamentarian of 2022 - Lok Sabha' award. The award was presented by former President Ram Nath Kovind during the Lokmat Parliamentary Awards ceremony held in New Delhi on 14 March 2023. he has previously been honored with the same distinction in 2013, 2014, 2019, and 2021. This consistent recognition underscores Owaisi's exceptional contributions and sustained dedication to his role as a parliamentarian. His continued success reaffirms his commitment to serving the people and making a significant impact within the legislative sphere. This recognition highlights Owaisi's outstanding contributions and exemplary performance as a parliamentarian.

== Political views ==
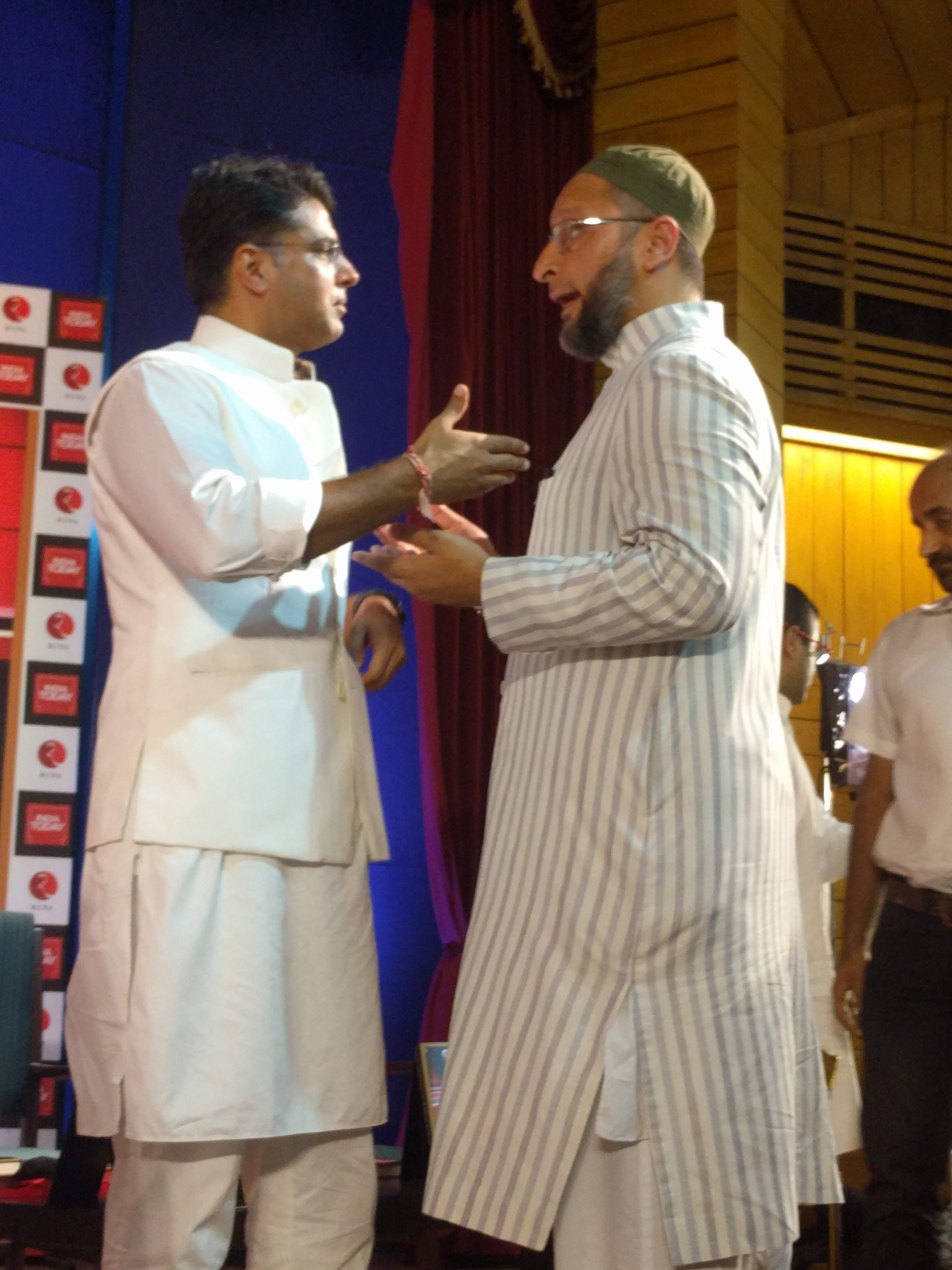
Asaduddin Owaisi (right) with Sachin Pilot during the book launch of Rajdeep Sardesai's book Newsman

Owaisi has strongly opposed Muhammad Ali Jinnah's two-nation theory. According to Patrick French, Owaisi appeals to "non-sectarian Muslim identity", though not to the Muslim faith, in a way similar to Jinnah's bid to be the sole spokesman of the Muslim community. His brand of Islamism with nationalism thrives in Hyderabad Old City.

Owaisi dismisses the comparison with Jinnah citing the fact that his fight is within the framework of the Indian constitution. He says that the secular parties of India have not been able to transfer their votes to Muslim candidates. Of the 23 Muslim MPs elected in 2014, 18 or 19 were from constituencies with 30% Muslim voters. While the parties claim not to discriminate against Muslims, they in practice leave the Muslims in a "ghettoized position". Hence, Muslims must develop their own political force, similar to OBCs, Dalits and Yadavs.

In the aftermath of 2008 Mumbai attacks, Owaisi demanded action against Zakiur Rehman Lakhvi and Hafiz Saeed for killing innocent people. He said that the enemies of the country were enemies of Muslims.

Owaisi supports reservation for backward Muslims in government jobs and education institutes. He states he is a critic of the Hindutva ideology, not against Hindus.

Owaisi argues for the abolition of the Haj subsidy given to the Indian Muslims for travelling to Mecca on religious pilgrimage and utilising the money for the education of Muslim women instead.

In July 2016, Owaisi was praised for his speech in which stated that the Islamic State of Iraq and the Levant (ISIS) is a problem among Muslims and called them dogs of hell. Owaisi said in his speech, which was delivered after 2016 Saudi Arabia bombings to monitor what is being said from some mosques, what and who is injecting radical venom.

In August 2016, Asaduddin Owaisi expressed his displeasure at the centre for inclusion of the Ahmadiyya community as a sect of Islam in 2011 Census of India, in a series of tweets.

In April 2017, on the issue of ban on cow slaughter, Owaisi criticised BJP for being hypocritical in treating cow as holy in Uttar Pradesh and North Indian states, but un-holy in the Northeast, Goa and Kerala."

Owaisi said that Muslim men divorcing their wife through instant triple talaq without reasons, must be socially boycotted, but said that the practice still exists. In December 2018, Owaisi told Pakistan Prime Minister Imran Khan to learn inclusive politics of India, when Pakistan can't even have a non-Muslim President.

After BJP's massive victory in 2019 Indian general election, Owaisi said the EVMs are not rigged, instead Hindu minds have been rigged. In June 2019, Owaisi said that Rahul Gandhi won from Wayanad (Lok Sabha constituency) due to 40% Muslim population.

On 17 November 2021 Owaisi filed a complaint against former chairman of the Shia Central Waqf Board of Uttar Pradesh, Syed Waseem Rizvi over a book written by the latter that he said had objectionable statements on Muhammad.

Following the 2025 India–Pakistan conflict, which resulted in the aftermath of the Pahalgam attack, Owaisi, as a part of all-party delegation to Bahrain, commented using profanities and insults that Pakistan is a failed state, and that the International Monetary Fund bailout only funds their "terrorist intentions". Owaisi also mocked Pakistan by calling them "stupid jokers" who want to compete with India, besides labelling them official beggars and stating that Pakistan should be put on FATF grey list. For exposing Pakistan and supporting India, Owaisi received praise from Union Minister and BJP leader Kiren Rijiju.

== Criticism and controversies ==
Owaisi has been in controversies and news due to his politics primarily centered around minorities.

Owaisi's political opponents in the BJP have linked the leader with a proliferation of terrorist activity in Hyderabad. In 2019, India's Minister of State for Home Affairs G. Kishan Reddy said that most of the country's terrorist incidents can be traced back to Hyderabad. In 2016, Owaisi was arrested for sedition after providing legal aid to five members of a so-called Islamic State terrorist cell. The complaint, filed to the Eleventh Metropolitan Magistrate court accused Owaisi of, "directly or indirectly helping the ISIS". BJP MLA for the Goshamahal assembly constituency in Hyderabad T. Raja Singh also stated that as per the Haren Pandya case of Gujarat, the accused were from Hyderabad consistency and 12 ISIS terrorists have also been caught from his (Owaisi's) constituency; Singh also accused Owaisi of financially supporting terrorists in the region.

Owaisi filed a First Information Report (FIR) against the former politician turned writer Syed Waseem Rizvi for allegedly offending Muslim religious sentiments following the publication of Rizvi's book, Muhammad. Owaisi said "The book, written in Hindi, vilifies Prophet Mohammed and uses objectionable language against the Prophet, the religion of Islam and its followers." Rizvi responded by stating that his book was based on "hidden facts" and that Owaisi should have read the text before reacting to it. In the same statement Rizvi accused Owaisi of radicalising Muslim youths saying, "Through his party, Owaisi is trying to mislead Muslim youths and pushing them further towards terrorism. He is hatching a conspiracy against the non-Muslim community and is planning a bloodshed". Following Owaisi's complaint, some members of the Muslim community in Telangana, Hyderabad hung and burned an effigy of Waseem in protest.

In 2013, he reiterated this threat, stating "Why do they hate Akbaruddin Owaisi? They haven't yet recovered from the '15 minute' blow yet".

In March 2016, while addressing a public rally in Maharashtra, Owaisi said that he would never say the slogan Bharat Mata Ki Jai (Hail mother India) in response to RSS chief Mohan Bhagwat's comment that the new generation needs to be taught to chant slogans hailing mother India; the comment was a reference to the 2016 JNU sedition controversy. Owaisi said, "Whom is he (Bhagwat) trying to frighten? He can't force his ideology on others. Nowhere in the Constitution it says that one should say: 'Bharat Mata ki Jai'." Later he clarified that he had no issues with slogan 'Bharat Mata ki Jai', but he had objection to RSS forcing people to chant the slogan as a test of patriotism.

=== Legal issues and assault case ===
Owaisi, along with his younger brother Akbaruddin, was booked for charges related to manhandling the Medak district collector in 2005. On 20 January 2013, he was remanded to judicial custody for 14 days, and later shifted to Sangareddy jail. The case related to an MIM protest on 16 April 2005 against the demolition of a mosque for a road-widening project in Medak district; police booked him under various charges including criminal intimidation, rioting, and promoting enmity between religious groups.

In 2009, a case was registered against Owaisi on the order of Election Commission of India for chasing and beating up Syed Saleemuddin, a polling agent of the Telugu Desam Party (TDP) in the Moghalpura area. In March 2013, he was detained for organising a rally without permission and carrying a gun without a licence in Bidar, Karnataka. In June 2014, Owaisi is said to have delivered hate speech against Prime Minister Narendra Modi in seeking the Muslim community's support for his party. In January 2015, Owaisi said that every child in the world is born as a Muslim, and his parents and society convert him to other religions. He also said Islam is the real home of all religions.

On 7 February 2016, Owaisi surrendered before Hyderabad police and was later granted bail for an assault by a mob that he allegedly led, carried out against Telangana Indian National Congress legislators. His close aide and AIMIM Party social media head, Syed Abdahu Kashaf, assaulted the congress MLC and leader of the opposition Shabbir Ali.

== Positions held ==
#	From	To	Position	Party
1.	1994	1999	MLA (1st term) from Charminar	AIMIM
2.	1999	2003	MLA (2nd term) from Charminar	AIMIM
3.	2004	2009	MP (1st term) in 14th Lok Sabha from Hyderabad	AIMIM
4.	2009	2014	MP (2nd term) in 15th Lok Sabha from Hyderabad	AIMIM
5.	2014	2019	MP (3rd term) in 16th Lok Sabha from Hyderabad	AIMIM
6.	2019	2024	MP (4th term) in 17th Lok Sabha from Hyderabad	AIMIM
7.	2024	Present	MP (5th term) in 18th Lok Sabha from Hyderabad	AIMIM

== See also ==
- Jamia Nizamia
- Obaidullah Khan Azmi
- Ittehad-e-Millat Council
- Indian Union Muslim League
- Deccan College of Medical Sciences
- Deccan College of Engineering and Technology
