= Deccan College of Medical Sciences =

Medical school situated in Hyderabad, India

- Owaisi Hospital & Research Centre
- Other name: DCMS
- Type: Private
- Established: 1984; 42 years ago
- Parent institution: Darussalam Education Trust
- Affiliations: KNR University of Health Sciences
- Chairman: Asaduddin Owaisi
- Superintendent: Dr. Gopal Kishan
- Principal: Dr. Ashfaq Hasan
- Managing Director: Akbaruddin Owaisi
- Academic staff: 209
- Undergraduates: 150
- Postgraduates: 50
- Location: D. M. R. L. 'X' Road, Kanchanbagh, Hyderabad, Telangana, India., Hyderabad, Telangana, 500058, India; 17°20′26.61″N 78°30′22.47″E
- Campus: Academic
- Website: dcms.ac.in

Deccan College of Medical Sciences (DCMS) is a medical school situated in Hyderabad, India offering the courses MBBS, postgraduate degree / diploma and superspeciality courses. It has an approved intake of 150 MBBS seats annually.

The college is affiliated to the KNR University of Health Sciences, Warangal from the academic year 2016-17 onwards. It was earlier affiliated to Dr. N. T. R. University of Health Sciences, Vijayawada. It is recognized by the Medical Council of India. It follows the syllabus prescribed by the university for MBBS course as mandated by Medical Council of India. The management observes such rules, regulation or orders which are applicable to minority institution without violating the rights conferred under Article 30(1) of the constitution of India.

== The management ==
Deccan College of Medical Sciences is established and administered by Muslim Minority Trust, i.e., Dar-us-salam Educational Trust under the provision of Article 30(1) of the constitution of India. Dar-us-Salam Educational Trust is an autonomous body with Asaduddin Owaisi as its chairman and Akbaruddin Owaisi as managing director.

The college is administered by the chief administrator Dr. (Colonel) G. K. N. Prasad. Dr. Ashfaq Hasan is the principal and also the Professor of the department of Respiratory Medicine.

=== Dar-us-Salam Educational Trust ===
Dar-us-Salam Educational Trust (DET) was established in 1974 as a self-financing minority institution under the chairmanship of Late Sultan Salahuddin Owaisi (ex Member of Parliament, India). After the death of Late Sultan Salahuddin Owaisi the trust is now headed by Asaduddin Owaisi.

== The building ==
The college is situated at Nawab Lutf ud Daula Palace, Zafargarh, Kanchanbagh near Santoshnagar, close to the Nizamia Observatory (a famed space observatory with a beautiful palace and a 7-storey tall structure was erected for the installation of telescopes which was started in the year 1907 ) by Nawab Zafar Jung Bahadur, the minister of defence during the 6th Nizam, Mir Mahboob Ali Khan's reign. Later it was moved to Begumpet and came under the purview of CESS - Center for Economic & Social Studies. The Nizamia Observatory was shifted from Ameerpet to Rangapur in RR district(currently not in use). Some of its counted achievements include:

- The counting of 7,63,542 stars during the 1920s
- Participated in the international astronomical project (Carte-du-Ciel) in 1909
- Studied Potsdam zone from 36 degrees to 39 degrees N in the sky
- Studied Pixs from 1910 to 1920

Attached to the college there is a seven-storey hospital. The college occupies an area of 66,070 sq ft (6,138 m^{2}) built-in area with adjacent open space of approximate 16 acres (65,000 m^{2}) for further expansion. It has an indoor sports complex, cricket ground, and basketball court.

The hospital building houses the Nursing and the Physiotherapy colleges. In the cellar of the hospital building, Department of Hospital Management, Deccan School of Management is located. Department of Hospital management offers Masters in Hospital management (M.H.M ), which is affiliated to Osmania University and approved by AICTE.

== Library ==
The college has a central library in addition to departmental libraries. As of 2018, it contains over 30,000 textbooks and reference books; and 130 print journals subscribed in 2018.

== Courses offered ==
=== Graduate degrees ===
M.B.B.S.	Bachelor of Medicine & Surgery

=== Postgraduate diplomas ===
Diploma in Anaesthesiology (D. A.)	Anaesthesia
Diploma in Gynaecology and Obstetrics (D.G.O.)	Obstetrics and gynaecology
Diploma in Orthopedics (D. Ortho.)	Orthopaedics
Diploma in Ophthalmology (D. O.)	Ophthalmology
Diploma in Laryngo-Otology (D. L. O.)	Otorhinolaryngology
Diploma in Medical Radio-diagnosis (D. M. R. D.)	Radiodiagnosis
Diploma in Dermatology and Venereal Diseases (D. D. V. L.)	Dermatology and Venereal Diseases
Diploma in Psychiatric Medicine (D. P. M.)	Psychiatry
Diploma in Child Health (D. C. H)	Paediatrics

=== Postgraduate degrees ===
Doctor of Medicine (M.D.)	Physiology
Doctor of Medicine (M.D.)	Biochemistry
Doctor of Medicine (M.D.)	Pathology
Doctor of Medicine (M.D.)	Pharmacology
Doctor of Medicine (M.D.)	Community Medicine
Doctor of Medicine (M.D.)	General Medicine
Doctor of Medicine (M.D.)	Paediatrics
Doctor of Medicine (M.D.)	Pulmonology
Doctor of Medicine (M.D.)	Anaesthesia
Doctor of Medicine (M.D.)	Dermatology
Doctor of Medicine (M.D.)	Microbiology
Doctor of Medicine (M.D.)	Psychiatry
Doctor of Medicine (M.D.)	Radiology
Master of Surgery (M. S.)	Anatomy
Master of Surgery (M. S.)	General Surgery
Master of Surgery (M. S.)	Obstetrics and Gynaecology
Master of Surgery (M. S.)	Orthopaedics
Master of Surgery (M. S.)	Ophthalmology
Master of Surgery (M. S.)	Otorhinolaryngology

=== Superspeciality degrees ===
D. M.	Cardiology
D. M.	Neurology
M. Ch.	Urology
M. Ch.	Plastic Surgery

== Alumni ==
- Deccan Alumni Association
- Deccan Alumni Association of North America

== See also ==
- List of Medical Schools in India
- Center For Stem Cell Science, Hyderabad
