= Majeed Ullah Khan Farhat =

Indian politician

President, MBT
- In office 5 June 2016
- Preceded by: Dr Khayam Khan

Personal details
- Born: 19-11-1969 Hyderabad
- Party: Majlis Bachao Tehreek
- Spouse: Mohammedi Khatoon (m. 1997)
- Children: 4
- Parent: Amanullah Khan (father)
- Relatives: Amjed Ullah Khan (brother)
- Profession: Politician

Majeed Ullah Khan Farhat is the president of Majlis Bachao Tehreek (MBT) in Hyderabad in the Indian state of Telangana, He is seen as a main opponent of All India Majlis-e-Ittehadul Muslimeen (AIMIM). He is the son of five-time MLA Amanullah Khan. He is the contested MLA from the Yakutpura Assembly constituency and convener to the Bahujan Left Front (BLF).

== Personal life ==
Khan was born on 19 November 1969 in Hyderabad, the fourth of seven siblings. He married on 23 August 1997 to Mohammedi Khatoon; the couple has four sons. He is the elder brother of MBT spokesperson Amjed Ullah Khan.

== Political career ==
Khan is very controversial as he was arrested in Terrorist and Disruptive Activities (Prevention) Act or TADA ACT in the year 1993 and was in police custody for 3 months and in judicial custody for 9 months on the suspicion of having links with the accused of 1993 bombings. He gained huge popularity and was granted bail after a year, just before the 1994 AP Assembly elections. His party won 2 seats (i.e., his father from Chandryangutta Constituency and their close aide Mumtaz Khan from Yakutpura Constituency, reducing the AIMIM to a single seat.

=== 1999 Assembly elections ===
Their close aide, Mumtaz Khan, switched sides and turned in favour of their arch-rival, AIMIM, and contested on their ticket. So Khan ran for office for the first time but lost in a close race.

=== 2004 General election ===
Khan ran for the Hyderabad Parliamentary seat against Asaduddin Owaisi and secured 3rd place with 47,000 votes

=== 2014 Telangana assembly election ===
After a decade-long gap, Khan returned to the election battleground fully charged. Khan had a huge wave of support. He addressed thousands of people at his public meetings. The election looked one-sided. He was contesting against Mumtaz Khan, who had defeated him earlier. On the day of voting, Khan was arrested for violating the model code of conduct. Khan alleged that his arrest was pre-planned to weaken him. Khan lost the election to Mumtaz Khan once again. He received 28,000 votes and placed 3rd.

=== 2018 Assembly Election ===
He was caught up in a controversy. He openly gave a death threat to Bhartiya Janta Party Member of Legislative Assembly T. Raja Singh and challenged him to come and fight him. This statement had very mixed reactions. He contested the election and secured around 23000 votes.

== See also ==
- Amjed Ullah Khan
- Majlis Bachao Tehreek
