= Amjed Ullah Khan =

Indian Politician from Hyderabad

Spokesperson MBT
- Preceded by: Majeed Ullah Khan Farhat

Personal details
- Born: 1972 (age 53–54) Hyderabad
- Party: Majlis Bachao Tehreek
- Children: Affan Ullah Khan
- Parent: Late Aman Ullah Khan (father)

Amjed Ullah Khan

Ex Corporator, 35 Azampura Division (GHMC)
- Succeeded by: Mohiuddin Abrar (AIMIM)
- Constituency: 35 Azampura(GHMC)

Amjed Ullah Khan (born 23 September 1972) is Ex Corporator, 35 Azampura Division (GHMC) and Spokesman of Majlis Bachao Tehreek (MBT) in Hyderabad in the Indian state of Telangana, He is controversial due to his views and as a main opponent of All India Majlis-e-Ittehadul Muslimeen (AIMIM).

== Background ==
Khan is the son of 5 time MLA Amanullah Khan. He rose to fame when he intervened in the kidnap and rape case of a Muslim girl at TRR College. Satya Prakash Singh had kidnapped the girl and held her prisoner for 17 months, during which time he repeatedly raped her. When her parents reported the crime, local police took no action because Singh's brother is a prominent lawyer. Khan led an agitation movement against the police and Singh. Joined by thousands of young people, it brought heavy pressure on the police. In another case, he urged Indian Prime Minister Narendra Modi to repatriate 450 Indians stranded in Sumeshi Jail, Jeddah, Saudi Arabia.

== Prajadarbar ==
He is well-known for his involvement with Prajadarbar, which provides financial assistance to the needy irrespective of cast, creed or religion.

== Majlis Bachao Tehreek ==
MBT was founded by politician Mohammed Amanullah Khan following a split from the AIMIM. Amanullah Khan, who was a trusted lieutenant of the then AIMIM President Sultan Salahuddin Owaisi, formed the MBT (Translate : Save Majlis Movement) in 1993 after his suspension for protesting against the weak stance that the AIMIM took during the demolition of the Babri Masjid. Later, he launched a campaign over the Babri Masjid demolition. Other crucial issues that he raised were lack of internal democracy in the party, nepotism, political patronage and corruption in the AIMIM's civic dealings.

== See also ==
- Majlis Bachao Tehreek
- Amanullah Khan (politician)
- Majeed Ullah Khan Farhat
