= Chandrayangutta Assembly constituency =

Constituency of the Telangana legislative assembly in India

Coordinates: 17.309°N 78.471°E

Chandrayanagutta
- Constituency No. 67 for the Telangana Legislative Assembly
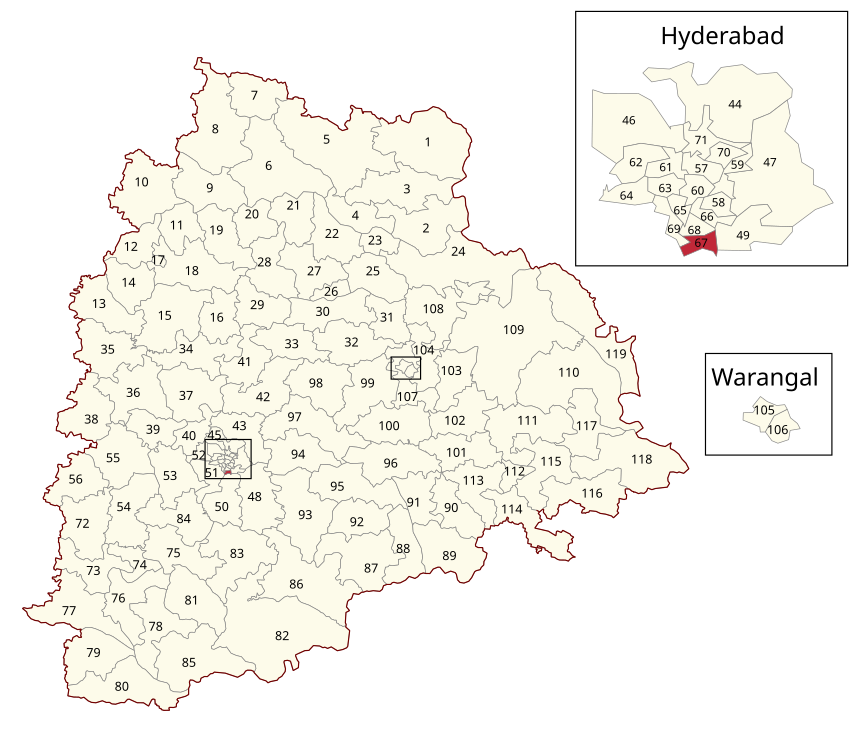
- Location of Chandrayanagutta Assembly constituency within Telangana

Constituency details
- Country: India
- Region: South India
- State: Telangana
- District: Hyderabad
- Lok Sabha constituency: Hyderabad
- Established: 1951
- Total electors: 3,63,278
- Reservation: None

Member of Legislative Assembly
- 3rd Telangana Legislative Assembly
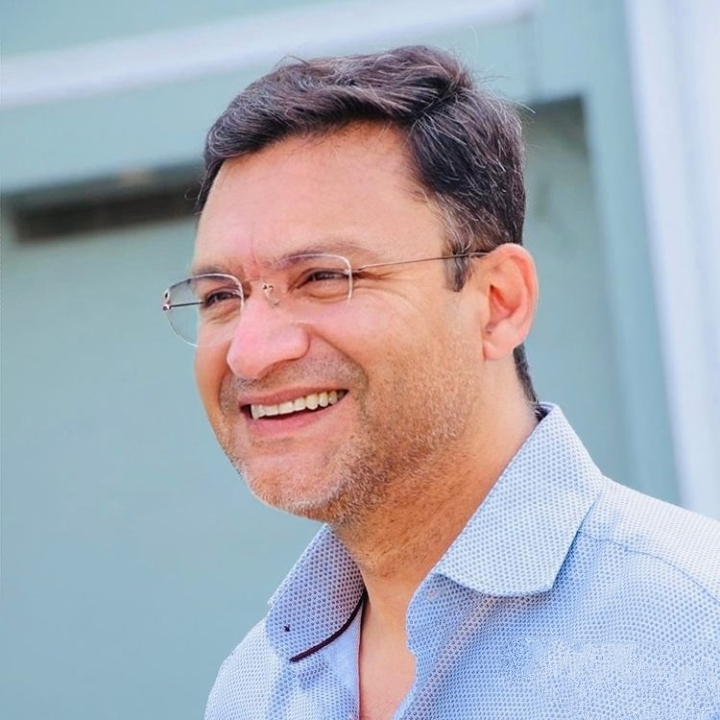
- Incumbent Akbaruddin Owaisi
- Party: AIMIM
- Elected year: 2023

Chandrayanagutta Assembly Constituency is constituency of Telangana Legislative Assembly, India. It is one of the 26 constituencies of CURE limits, a strategic zone created by Government of Telangana. It is part of Hyderabad Lok Sabha constituency. Akbaruddin Owaisi, floor leader of AIMIM in Telangana Legislative Assembly represents the constituency.

== Extent of the constituency ==
The Assembly Constituency presently comprises the following neighbourhoods:

Neighbourhood
Chandrayan Gutta
Barkas
Bandlaguda
Moin Bagh
Jangammet
Rakshapuram
Edi Bazar (part)
Uppuguda (part)

== Members of Legislative Assembly ==
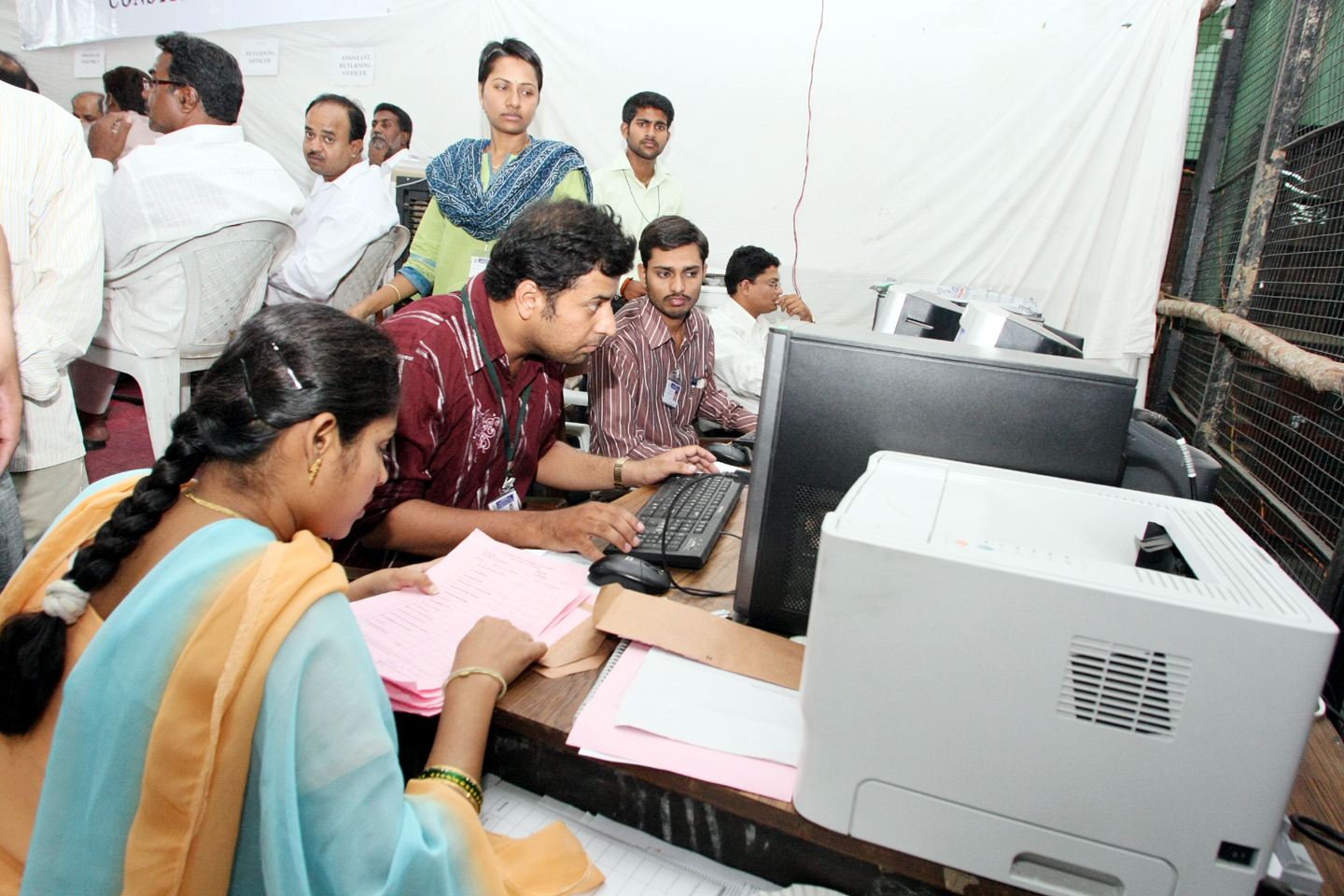
Election results being updated at a Chandrayangutta Assembly Segment Counting Centre, in Hyderabad on May 16, 2009

Members of Legislative State Assembly, who represented Chandrayangutta.

Year	MLA	Party
Hyderabad State Legislative Assembly
1952	Ekbote Gopal Rao	Indian National Congress
United Andra Pradesh State Legislative Assembly
1978	Amanullah Khan	Independent
1983	Amanullah Khan	Independent
1985	Amanullah Khan	Independent
1989	Amanullah Khan	All India Majlis-e-Ittehadul Muslimeen
1994	Amanullah Khan	Majlis Bachao Tehreek
1999	Akbaruddin Owaisi	All India Majlis-e-Ittehadul Muslimeen
2004	Akbaruddin Owaisi	All India Majlis-e-Ittehadul Muslimeen
2009	Akbaruddin Owaisi	All India Majlis-e-Ittehadul Muslimeen
Telangana Legislative Assembly
2014	Akbaruddin Owaisi	All India Majlis-e-Ittehadul Muslimeen
2018	Akbaruddin Owaisi	All India Majlis-e-Ittehadul Muslimeen
2023	Akbaruddin Owaisi	All India Majlis-e-Ittehadul Muslimeen

== Election results ==
Vote share of Winning candidates
2023	64.89%
2018	67.95%
2014	59.19%
2009	46.59%
2004	42.45%
1999	34.87%
1994	48.08%
1989	68.15%
1985	51.08%
1983	48.19%
1978	35.95%
1952	62.86%

=== 2023 ===
2023 Telangana Legislative Assembly election: Chandrayangutta
Party	Candidate	Votes	%	±%
AIMIM	Akbaruddin Owaisi	99,776	64.89	
BRS	Sitharam Reddy Muppi	18,116	11.78	
BJP	Kowdi Mahender	16,414	10.67	
INC	Boya Nagesh	14,589	9.49	
NOTA	None of the Above	1,460	0.95	
MBT	Rashed Hashmi	804	0.52	
IND	4 Independent Candidates	1,715	1.12	
OTH	5 Other Party Candidates	897	0.58	
Majority		81,660	53.11	
Turnout		153,771		
AIMIM hold		Swing		

=== 2018 ===
2018 Telangana Legislative Assembly election: Chandrayangutta
Party	Candidate	Votes	%	±%
AIMIM	Akbaruddin Owaisi	95,341	67.95	
BJP	Shahejadi Sayyad	15,078	10.75	
TRS	M. Seetha Ram Reddy	14,227	10.14	
INC	Esa Bin Obaid Misri	11,310	8.06	
NOTA	None of the Above	1,010	0.72	
IND	8 Independent Candidates	2,134	1.51	
OTH	3 Other Party Candidates	1,202	0.86	
Majority		80,263	57.20	
Turnout		140,302	47.80	
AIMIM hold		Swing		

=== 2014 ===
2014 Telangana Legislative Assembly election: Chandrayangutta
Party	Candidate	Votes	%	±%
AIMIM	Akbaruddin Owaisi	80,393	59.19	
MBT	Dr. Khayam Khan	21,119	15.55	
TDP	M. Prakash Mudiraj	17,391	12.80	
TRS	Muppidi Seetharam Reddy	7,278	5.36	
INC	B. R. Sadanand	5,120	3.77	
AAP	Mohd Samiullah Qureshi	597	0.44	
NOTA	None of the Above	503	0.37	
IND	10 Independent Candidates	2,656	1.96	
OTH	3 Other Party Candidates	774	0.57	
Majority		59,274	43.64	
Turnout		135,831	51.58	
AIMIM hold		Swing		

=== 2009 ===
2009 Andhra Pradesh Legislative Assembly election: Chandrayangutta
Party	Candidate	Votes	%	±%
AIMIM	Akbaruddin Owaisi	45,492	46.59	
MBT	Dr. Khayam Khan	30,315	31.05	
INC	B. Venkatesh	7,882	8.07	
BJP	K. Jagjeevan Reddy	5,359	5.49	
PRP	M. Raju Yadav	4,691	4.80	
TRS	Syed Khaja Fakruddin	986	1.01	
IND	6 Independent Candidates	1,798	1.84	
OTH	4 Other Party Candidates	1,119	1.15	
Majority		15,177	15.54	
Turnout				
AIMIM hold		Swing		

=== 2004 ===
2004 Andhra Pradesh Legislative Assembly election: Chandrayangutta
Party	Candidate	Votes	%	±%
AIMIM	Akbaruddin Owaisi	58,513	42.45	
MBT	Dr. Khayam Khan	46,569	33.78	
TDP	K. Swarajya Lakshmi	18,070	13.11	
INC	G. S. Seeta Rama Raju	11,486	8.33	
ABJS	Anil Kumar Srivastav	995	0.72	
TRS	Taher Kamal Khundmiri	730	0.53	
JP	C. Vijayender Rao	272	0.20	
IND	6 Independent Candidates	1,205	0.87	
Majority		11,944	8.67	
Turnout				
AIMIM hold		Swing		

=== 1999 ===
1999 Andhra Pradesh Legislative Assembly election: Chandrayangutta
Party	Candidate	Votes	%	±%
AIMIM	Akbaruddin Owaisi	66,657	34.87	
MBT	Md. Amanullah Khan	54,737	28.64	
TDP	Avula Bharath Prakash	53,431	27.95	
INC	G. Anand	9,281	4.86	
ATDP	P. Sudershan	2,435	1.27	
IND	Mohammed Dastagir	1,847	0.97	
NTRTDP(LP)	R. Ashok	880	0.46	
IND	Habeeb Sikender	744	0.39	
NCP	B. Rama Krishna	613	0.32	
IND	Md. Osman	524	0.27	
Majority		11,920	6.23	
Turnout		191,150	71.30	
Swing to AIMIM from MBT		Swing		

=== 1994 ===
1994 Andhra Pradesh Legislative Assembly election: Chandrayangutta
Party	Candidate	Votes	%	±%
MBT	Mohd. Amanullah Khan	64,025	48.08	
AIMIM	Yousuf Bin Abdul Khader	28,315	21.26	
BJP	Sukh Dev Arya	15,514	11.65	
TDP	Dr. A. Bharath Prakash	13,994	10.51	
INC	S. Pandu Ranga Rao	8,908	6.69	
IND	Acharya Dayashanker Dwivedi	563	0.42	
IND	Jala Krishna	372	0.28	
IND	Alam Pally Narender	246	0.18	
IND	D. Sri Ramulu Naik	175	0.13	
IND	R. Surender	162	0.12	
IND	Shaik Mahboob	138	0.10	
JP	Ch. Venkat Rajaiah	125	0.09	
IND	Jagannatham	100	0.08	
IND	Shaik Abdul Rahman	94	0.07	
IND	Gnaneshwar Varakala	76	0.06	
IND	Colconda Yadaiah	74	0.06	
IND	Singireddy Mohan Reddy	67	0.05	
IND	Sardar Jagath Singh	57	0.04	
IND	M. Yadagiri	48	0.04	
IND	Pangala Narsimhulu Yadav	38	0.03	
IND	Habeeb Abdul Quader	32	0.02	
IND	Mohd. Dasthagiri	31	0.02	
Majority		35,710	26.82	
Turnout		135,443	56.20	
Swing to MBT from AIMIM		Swing		

=== 1989 ===
1989 Andhra Pradesh Legislative Assembly election: Chandrayangutta
Party	Candidate	Votes	%	±%
AIMIM	Mohd. Amanullah Khan	116,587	68.15	
TDP	P. Brahmananda Chary	38,440	22.47	
INC	K. S. Santosh	13,705	8.01	
DMM	Hussain Hasan Somali	650	0.38	
IND	K. Ramulu	464	0.27	
IND	B. Jagadish	298	0.17	
IND	G. Veeresha	198	0.12	
IND	Pendam Vidya Sagar	146	0.09	
JP	Mohana Chari	130	0.08	
IND	G. Sadanand	124	0.07	
IND	G. Yadaiah	121	0.07	
IND	Ahmed Hussain Saber Jant	98	0.06	
IND	S. Muralidhar Reddy	70	0.04	
IND	G. Sudershan Reddy	53	0.03	
Majority		78,147	45.68	
Turnout		174,285	74.25	
Swing to AIMIM from Independent		Swing		

=== 1985 ===
1985 Andhra Pradesh Legislative Assembly election: Chandrayangutta
Party	Candidate	Votes	%	±%
IND	Mohd. Amanullah Khan	57,034	51.08	
IND	G. Krishna	54,025	48.39	
INC	Habeeb Musthafa	593	0.53	
Majority		3,009	2.69	
Turnout		113,099	74.79	
Independent hold		Swing		

=== 1983 ===
1983 Andhra Pradesh Legislative Assembly election: Chandrayangutta
Party	Candidate	Votes	%	±%
IND	Mohd. Amanullah Khan	43,822	48.19	
BJP	Narendra Aile	40,241	44.25	
INC	G. Niranjan	4,176	4.59	
IND	Upendranath	2,555	2.81	
JP	Mohd. Osman	146	0.16	
Majority		3,581	3.94	
Turnout		93,035	81.37	
Independent hold		Swing		

=== 1978 ===
1978 Andhra Pradesh Legislative Assembly election: Chandrayangutta
Party	Candidate	Votes	%	±%
IND	Mohd. Amanullah Khan	16,890	35.95	
INC(I)	M. Baliah	15,557	33.12	
JP	Mir Ahmed Ali Khan	11,169	23.78	
INC	V. Hanumanth Rao	2,878	6.13	
IND	A. Rahman Sajid	390	0.83	
IND	Ali	93	0.20	
Majority		1,333	2.83	
Turnout		48,242	58.78	
Independent win (new seat)				

=== 1952 ===
1952 Hyderabad Legislative Assembly election: Chaderghat
Party	Candidate	Votes	%	±%
INC	Gopal Rao Ekbote	12,287	62.86	
Socialist	Bhanwarlal	3,633	18.59	
IND	Bojjam Narsimlu	2,739	14.01	
RRP	Bhaskar Rao	889	4.55	
Majority		8,654	44.27	
Turnout		19,548	40.14	
INC win (new seat)				

== Trivia ==
- Mohd. Amanullah Khan, founder of Majlis Bachao Tehreek, served the constituency for five terms as he won four times as Majlis candidate and one time as MBT Candidate. Since then, Akbaruddin Owaisi, the Floor Leader of MIM In Telangana assembly, has represented the constituency. MIM and MBT have a strong rivalry in the constituency.

== See also ==
- Chandrayangutta
- List of constituencies of Telangana Legislative Assembly
