= G. S. Melkote =

Indian freedom fighter and parliamentarian

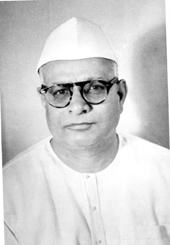
- Gopaliah Subbukrishna Melkote

Member of Parliament, Lok Sabha
- In office 1971 - 1977
- Preceded by: Vinayak Rao Koratkar
- Succeeded by: Himself
- Constituency: Hyderabad

Member of Parliament, Lok Sabha
- In office 1962 - 1970
- Preceded by: Vinayak Rao Koratkar
- Constituency: Hyderabad
- In office 1957 - 1962
- Preceded by: Seat established
- Succeeded by: Jagannathrao Venkatarao Chandriki
- Constituency: Raichur

Member of Hyderabad Legislative Assembly
- In office 1952–1957
- Preceded by: Seat established
- Succeeded by: K. Seethiah Gupta
- Constituency: Musheerabad

Personal details
- Born: 15 October 1901 Berhampur, Madras Presidency, British India (presently in Odisha)
- Died: 9 March 1982 (aged 80)
- Party: Indian National Congress (Till 1970, 1975-1982)
- Other political affiliations: Telangana Praja Samithi (1970-1975)
- Spouse: Vimlabai
- Children: 5; 3 sons and 2 daughter
- Parents: Gopalayya (father); Parvathamma (mother)

G. S. Melkote (16 October 1901 – 10 March 1982), born Gopaliah Subbukrishna Melkote, was an Indian freedom fighter, politician and parliamentarian.

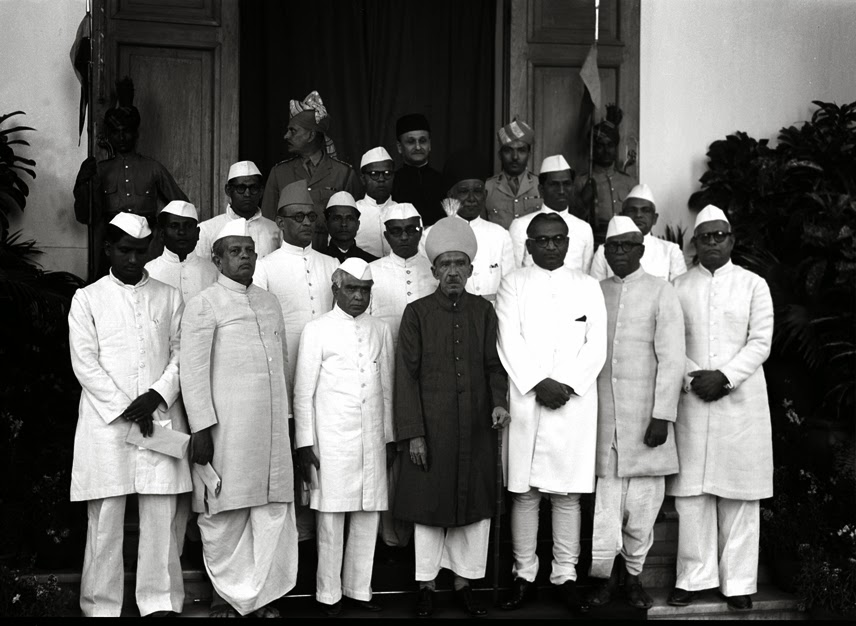
Finance Minister G. S. Melkote among other members of the first cabinet of Hyderabad State

He was born at Berhampur in Odisha state on the auspicious day of Saraswathi Pooja. He did L.M.S. from Osmania University in 1927 and practiced for some time combining the traditional medicine with Yogic practices. He was the president of Indian Medical Association, Hyderabad branch for some time and established Patanjali Yoga Research Institute.

He participated in various activities of Indian Freedom Movement, such as the Home Rule movement, Salt Satyagraha, and Quit India movements.

After Indian independence, he contributed significantly in the development of Hyderabad state as Member of Hyderabad Assembly from Musheerabad between 1952 and 1957. He was also the finance Minister for Hyderabad state from 1952 till unification of Hyderabad and Andhra State (to form Andhra Pradesh under States reorganization act, 1956). He was elected to the Indian Parliament three times (1962, 1967 and 1977) from the Hyderabad constituency and in 1957 from Raichur constituency.

He resigned as member of Lok Sabha in 1970, also left Indian National Congress to join Telangana movement, eventually joining Telangana Praja Samithi.

His wife Vimalabai was also a freedom fighter.
