= Vinayak Rao Koratkar =

Indian politician

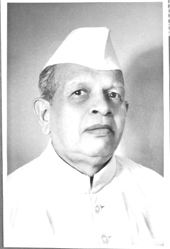

Member of Parliament, Lok Sabha
- In office 1957–1962
- Preceded by: Ahmed Mohiuddin
- Succeeded by: G. S. Melkote
- Constituency: Hyderabad

Personal details
- Born: 3 February 1895 Kalamb, Hyderabad State, British India (now in Maharashtra, India)
- Died: 3 September 1962 (aged 67) Hyderabad, Andhra Pradesh, India
- Party: Indian National Congress
- Spouse: Laxmibai Koratkar
- Children: 3; 2 sons and 1 daughter

Vinayak Rao Koratkar (3 February 1895 – 3 September 1962) was a political leader of Hyderabad State and Member of Indian Parliament.

== Biography ==
He was son of Shri Keshav Rao Koratkar and Geeta Bai. He was born at Kalamb, Osmanabad district on 3 February 1895. He was educated at Gurukul Kangri Vishwavidyalaya, Haridwar and obtained Vidyalankar degree. He has studied in London University and Agricultural College, Poona. He did Bar-at-Law from Middle Temple, London in 1922.

He married Shrimati Laxmi Bai Koratkar in 1924. They had 2 sons and 1 daughter.

As a barrister, he has practiced at Bar from 1922 to 1950. He was editor of Deccan Law Reports in Hyderabad State.

He was president, Arya Pratinidhi Sabha, Hyderabad for about 19 years between 1930 and 1950. He was President of Aryan Education Society, Hindi Prachar Sabha and Education Conference of Hyderabad. He has run Hindi weekly Arya Bhanu magazine as its proprietor-editor for five years.

He was minister in Hyderabad State in several capacities from 1950 to 1956. He was Member of Hyderabad Legislature from 1952 to 1956 and worked as finance minister in Burgula Ramakrishna Rao cabinet. He was Member of Bombay Legislature from 1956 to 1957.

He was elected to the 2nd Lok Sabha from Hyderabad (Lok Sabha constituency) in 1957 as a member of Indian National Congress.

He has established Keshava Memorial School and Hindi Mahavidyalaya in Hyderabad city. He died on 3 September 1962.
