= Afsar Khan (politician) =

Indian politician

Afsar Khan (1950 – 7 February 2015), also known as Mohd Muqteda Khan, was the senior member and core member of AIMIM, who was elected to serve as MLA in the Andhra Pradesh Legislative Assembly for Karwan constituency between 2003 and 2014. He died on 7 February 2015 at the age of 65. Due to heart attack and having suffering from prolong illness. His funeral prayers is performed in Masjid e Aziza at Mehdipatnam

Afsar Khan and 20 AIMIM members attacked noted Bangladeshi novelist Taslima Nasreen as protest against blasphemy against Muhammed on 9-August-2007 during the launch of her new book in Hyderabad.
