= Kings Colony, Shastripuram =

Shastripuram Housing Colony
- Society
- Location in Telangana Shastripuram Housing Colony (Telangana) Shastripuram Housing Colony (India)
- Coordinates: 17°19′52″N 78°26′47″E
- Country: India
- State: Telangana
- City: Ranga Reddy
- Districts: Rajendar Nagar, Circle No.6

Shastripuram Housing Colony is an area in the Ranga Reddy District of Telangana, India. It comes under Rajendra Nagar Circle 6 Government of Telangana.
