= Amanullah Khan (Indian politician) =

Indian politician

Member of Legislative Assembly of Andhra Pradesh
- In office 1978–1999
- Preceded by: Constituency created
- Succeeded by: Akbaruddin Owaisi
- Constituency: Chandrayangutta

President OF Majlis Bachao Tehreek
- In office 1993–2002
- Preceded by: Office created
- Succeeded by: Adam Malik

Personal details
- Born: Muhammad Amanullah Khan; 30 May 1935 Atraf e Badala, Princy State of Hyderabad
- Died: 10 November 2002 (aged 67) Hyderabad, Andra Pradesh India
- Party: Majlis Bachao Tehreek
- Other political affiliations: All India Majlis-e-Ittehadul Muslimeen
- Children: Dr. Khayam Ullah Khan; Amjed Ullah Khan; Majeed Ullah Khan Farhat; Muzaffar Ullah Khan; Dr.Mujahid Ullah Khan
- Occupation: Politician

Amanullah Khan was an Indian politician in Hyderabad Old City. Khan joined the Majlis-e-Ittehadul Muslimeen in 1960. He contested from the Chandrayangutta Assembly segment for the first time in 1978 and won against the Indian Congress nominee, K. Baliah.

Khan retained the seat for five terms. He represented Chandrayangutta assembly constituency between 1978 and 1994. Four times he was elected as an AIMIM candidate (1978, 1983, 1985, and 1989) and in 1994 as an MBT candidate. Amanullah Khan retained the seat for five terms. He represented Chandrayangutta constituency between 1978 and 1999. Four times he was elected as an AIMIM candidate and in 1994 as an MBT candidate. In 1999 he ran as an MBT candidate, but lost to AIMIM candidate Akbaruddin Owaisi by margin of (6.2%) 11,920 votes. He was also the founder of Majlis Bachao Tehreek save majlis movement and was its president at the time of his death on 10 November 2002.

== See also ==
- Majlis Bachao Tehreek
- Majeed Ullah Khan
- Amjed Ullah Khan
