= Akbaruddin Owaisi =

Indian politician (born 1970)

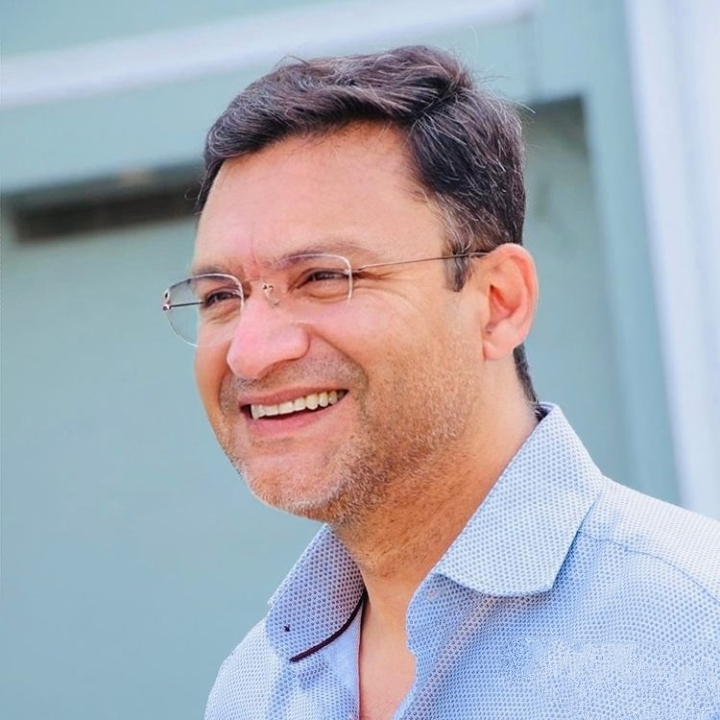
- Owaisi in 2022

1st AIMIM Floor Leader Telangana Legislative Assembly
- Incumbent
- Assumed office 2 June 2014
- Preceded by: office established

Member of Telangana Legislative Assembly
- Incumbent
- Assumed office 2 June 2014
- Preceded by: position established
- Constituency: Chandrayangutta

3rd Pro-tem Speaker Telangana Legislative Assembly
- In office 8 December 2023 – 14 December 2023
- Governor: Dr. Tamilisai Soundararajan
- Chief Minister: Revanth Reddy
- Preceded by: Mumtaz Ahmed Khan

2nd AIMIM Floor Leader Andhra Pradesh Legislative Assembly
- In office 14 May 2004 – 1 June 2014
- Preceded by: Asaduddin Owaisi
- Succeeded by: office abolished
- Constituency: Chandrayangutta

Member of Andhra Pradesh Legislative Assembly
- In office 11 October 1999 – 1 June 2014
- Preceded by: Amanullah Khan
- Succeeded by: constituency shifted to Telangana
- Constituency: Chandrayangutta

Personal details
- Born: 14 June 1970 (age 56) Hyderabad, Andhra Pradesh, India
- Party: All India Majlis-e-Ittehadul Muslimeen
- Spouse: Sabina Farzana
- Relations: Asaduddin Owaisi (brother)
- Children: 2
- Parent: Sultan Salahuddin Owaisi (father)
- Profession: Politician; businessman

Akbaruddin Owaisi (born 14 June 1970) is an Indian politician and the leader of All India Majlis-e-Ittehadul Muslimeen (AIMIM) party in Telangana. Since 2014, he has been MLA of the Chandrayangutta constituency in the Telangana Legislative Assembly. Owaisi was appointed Chairman of Telangana Public Accounts Committee in 2019.

Owaisi has presided over the Chandrayangutta assembly constituency from 1999, winning for the sixth consecutive term in the latest 2023 state election and assumed the position of floor leader in 2004 upon his second assembly win.

Owaisi's speeches have drawn comparisons with other populist leaders and incited violence on multiple occasions.

== Early life and background ==
Owaisi was born in Hyderabad on 14 June 1970 to Sultan Salahuddin Owaisi and Najmunnisa Begum.

== Personal life ==
Owaisi is married to Sabina Farzana. He has one daughter and one son. His daughter, Fatima Keneez Owaisi took the bar at Lincoln's Inn and is a barrister in the United Kingdom.

== Political career ==
Owaisi has been elected as the Member of the Legislative Assembly for Chandrayangutta constituency on six consecutive occasions, in 1999, 2004, 2009, 2014, 2018 and latest 2023. He served as a deputy to his elder brother Asaduddin Owaisi, who was leading the AIMIM in the House. In 2004, Akbaruddin became the floor leader of AIMIM in the Assembly upon Asaduddin's election to Lok Sabha from Hyderabad. He was re-elected in 2009 and led the seven-member AIMIM in the House.

Owaisi won his fourth consecutive victory in Assembly polls from Chandrayangutta assembly in 2014. Akbaruddin Owaisi won his fifth consecutive victory in Assembly polls from Chandrayangutta Assembly in 2018. In 2019, he was appointed Chairman of Telangana Public Accounts Committee.

Owaisi got elected for the 6th consecutive term as a Member of the Legislative Assembly, and is the senior most member of the Telangana Assembly. He was appointed pro-tem Speaker on 9 December 2023.

== Other ventures ==
Owaisi established Salar-e-Millat Educational Trust, after his father's title, meaning commander of the community. The trust runs a chain of Owaisi School of Excellence in Hyderabad which provides free education to poor children in these schools. The schools impart academic knowledge as well as islamic instruction.

The trust also manages the chain of Owaisi Livelihood School, which provides training to girls and women in Mehndi design, tailoring, embroidery and beautician.

== Notable Work ==
=== Plea for funds for Renovation of Mahankali temple ===
In February 2020, Owaisi met Telangana Chief Minister K Chandrashekar Rao at Pragati Bhavan and requested Rs 10 crore for renovation of Simhavauhini Mahankali temple at Lal Darwaja in Old City Hyderabad.

== Positions held ==
#	From	To	Position	Party
1.	1999	2004	MLA (1st term) from Chandrayangutta	AIMIM
2.	2004	2009	MLA (2nd term) from Chandrayangutta	AIMIM
3.	2009	2014	MLA (3rd term) from Chandrayangutta	AIMIM
4.	2014	2018	MLA (4th term) from Chandrayangutta	AIMIM
5.	2018	2023	MLA (5th term) from Chandrayangutta	AIMIM
6.	2023	Present	MLA (6th term) from Chandrayangutta	AIMIM

== Controversies ==
He has been charged several times for hate speeches denigrating Hindu gods and inciting violence against Hindus. He said that 25 crore Muslims would need just 15 minutes without the police to finish 100 crore Hindus.

=== Threats to kill ===
In August 2007, along with other members of his party, Owaisi made death threats against Taslima Nasrin, pledging that the fatwa against her and Salman Rushdie would be upheld if they visited Hyderabad. Owaisi said, "we in Hyderabad want to behead this woman according to the fatwa."

=== Speech at Adilabad ===
On 22 December 2012, Owaisi addressed a rally in Nirmal, Adilabad Andhra Pradesh, making controversial remarks against Hindu groups, RSS, VHP, and BJP. He denigrated Hindu gods and mocked Hindu cremation. Owaisi left for London for medical treatment after the speech. Reports suggested he was treated for injuries from a 2011 attack. Interrogation of a former ISIS suicide bomber in 2015 claimed Owaisi's speeches influenced his extremist mindset, leading him to join the terrorist organisation.

==== Legal proceedings ====
On 28 December 2012, a petition was filed in a local court in Nampally of Hyderabad against Akbaruddin Owaisi for hurting the sentiments of Hindus, and for making inflammatory, derogatory and offensive remarks. Another petition was filed by a businessman S Venkatesh Goud in Hyderabad. The Andhra Pradesh Human Rights Commission directed the Hyderabad Police Commissioner to submit an inquiry report on the alleged hate speech by 17 January 2013.

On 3 January 2013, Abid Rasool Khan, General Secretary of Andhra Pradesh Congress Committee, told news channel CNN IBN the state government had "taken cognizance of Owaisi's speech" and was "collecting evidence to build a strong FIR and a water-tight case where we can book the person causing hatred."

On 5 January 2013, a case was filed against Owaisi in Mumbai while a court in Vadodara served a notice on him for "hate speech". In May 2014, Andhra Pradesh government gave nod to prosecute Akbaruddin Owaisi in a 2004 case for an alleged hate speech.

==== Arrest and bail ====
Owaisi returned to Hyderabad on 7 January 2013 and was welcomed by his 7 MLA's and MIM leaders at the Hyderabad airport. He later drove to his house in the Banjara Hills area of the city. Owaisi failed to answer a police summons at Nirmal town on 8 January, citing ill-health, and asked for four days' time to appear for investigation. A team of doctors examined Owaisi at his home twice on 7 January. The police declared that he was fit for investigation albeit he cited bad health. Owaisi also petitioned the High Court of Andhra Pradesh to quash the cases filed against him in lower courts. On 8 January, doctors examined him at the Gandhi Hospital and confirmed that their tests showed no medical grounds to prevent his arrest, following which he was arrested by Hyderabad police. At the Gandhi Hospital, Owaisi alleged that the doctors were trying to murder him by giving lethal injections. After spending 40 days in prison, Akbaruddin Owaisi was granted bail on 15 February 2013.

==== Criticism and comments ====
Owaisi, considered a "divisive leader" by his political opponents, faced media criticism for a speech known as the "15 Minutes Speech" in which he made anti-Hindu comments as well as death threats against Sir Salman Rushdie and Taslima Nasrin. His remarks triggered widespread condemnation, including calls for legal action, due to concerns of inciting religious tensions.

== See also ==
- Amjed Ullah Khan
- Ahmed Pasha Quadri
- Waris Pathan
- Imtiyaz Jaleel
