= Etemaad Daily =

Urdu newspaper based in Hyderabad, India

Etemaad
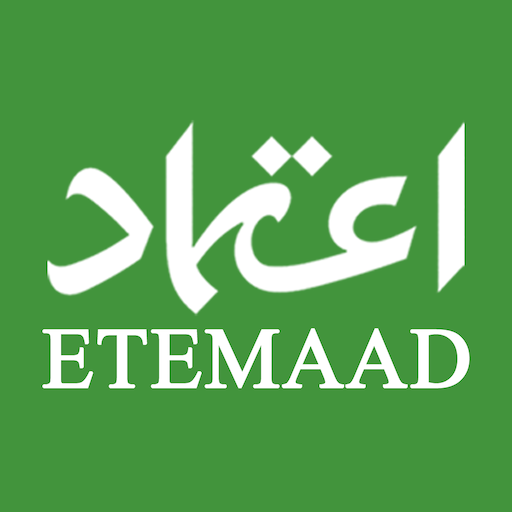
- Type: Daily newspaper
- Format: Broadsheet
- Owner: AIMIM
- Editor-in-chief: Burhanuddin Owaisi
- Founded: 1 January 2002 (24 years ago)
- Language: Urdu
- Headquarters: Darussalam, Hyderabad, Telangana, India
- Website: etemaaddaily.com

Etemaad Daily is an Urdu newspaper based in Hyderabad, Telangana, India. It was established in the year 2002 and is owned by a local political party All India Majlis-e-Ittehadul Muslimeen. Its editor is Burhanuddin Owaisi, son of Sultan Salahuddin Owaisi who was the president of All India Majlis-e-Ittehadul Muslimeen. Etemaad Daily is located in the Darussalam, Gosha mahal area of Hyderabad. It is the largest selling Urdu newspaper in Hyderabad and local Cities.
