= Sultan Salahuddin Owaisi =

Indian politician (1931–2008)

2nd President of All India Majlis-e-Ittehadul Muslimeen
- In office 1983 – 29 September 2008
- Preceded by: Abdul Wahid Owaisi
- Succeeded by: Asaduddin Owaisi

Member of Parliament, Lok Sabha
- In office 28 December 1984 – 22 May 2004
- Preceded by: K. S. Narayana
- Succeeded by: Asaduddin Owaisi
- Constituency: Hyderabad

Personal details
- Born: 14 February 1931 Hyderabad, Hyderabad State, British India (now Telangana, India)
- Died: 29 September 2008 (aged 77) Hyderabad, Andhra Pradesh (now Telangana), India
- Party: All India Majlis-e-Ittehadul Muslimeen
- Spouse: Najmunnisa Begum (m. 1 Jan 1967)
- Children: 4, including, Asaduddin, Akbaruddin
- Parent: Abdul Wahid Owaisi
- Education: Aligarh Muslim University; Osmania University
- Known for: Majlis-e-Ittehadul Muslimeen; All India Muslim Personal Law Board

Sultan Salahuddin Owaisi (14 February 1931 – 29 September 2008) also known by his supporters as Salar-e-Millat (commander of community) was an Indian politician who served as the second president of the All India Majlis-e-Ittehadul Muslimeen (AIMIM) from 1983 until his death in 2008. Active in the Telangana region, Owaisi served as the Member of Parliament from Hyderabad for six consecutive terms until his retirement in 2004. He is the father of the current member of parliament representing Hyderabad Lok Sabha constituency barrister Asaduddin Owaisi who is the current president of all AIMIM.

== Family and background ==
Owaisi's father, Abdul Wahid Owaisi, was the president of the All India Majlis-e-Ittehadul Muslimeen till his death. In 1976, Salahuddin Owaisi took over the presidency of the Majlis after his father's death. Owaisi was the father of three sons. His eldest son, Asaduddin Owaisi, succeeded his father as president of the Majlis and has also retained his father's pocket-borough of Hyderabad since 2004 (when Owaisi retired). Owaisi's second son, Akbaruddin Owaisi, is a member of the Telangana Legislative Assembly from the Chandrayangutta Assembly Constituency.

== Political career ==
Owaisi stepped into politics in 1958 at a very early age and was active when his father was jailed in the same year. Owaisi, also known as "Salar-e-Millat", repeatedly alleged in his speeches that the Indian state had "abandoned" the Muslims to their fate. Therefore, "Muslims should stand on their own feet, rather than look to the State for help", he argued. Owaisi was considered to be the strongest person in Hyderabad politics as his power extended till the borders of United Andhra Pradesh. Muslims in the State rallied behind him and he was considered to be the man who could tilt the Muslim vote bank in Andhra Pradesh to whichever Party he felt like supporting. He was considered to be the most prominent Muslim Leader in Hyderabad.

=== Election information ===
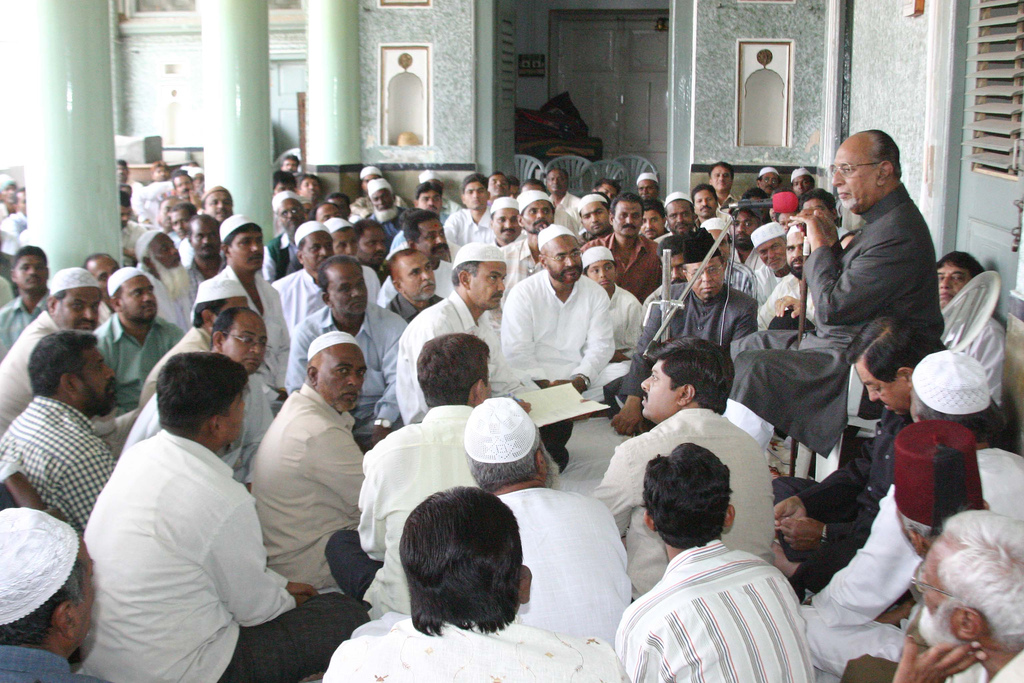
Salahuddin Owaisi addressing MIM party workers at MIM Headquarters Darussalam.

To work for the economic development and educational advancement of the minorities; Owaisi established minority Engineering College, Medical College, Pharmacy, Degree College and Colleges for hospital management, MBA, MCA and Nursing, a Co-operative Bank, an Industrial Training Institute, and two Hospitals and Urdu Newspaper Etemaad Daily; evinced keen interest in espousing the cause of promotion and protection of Urdu language, literature and culture.

- Won in 1960 Hyderabad Corporation Election from Mallepally
- Won in 1962 Assembly Election for first time from Patthergati constituency
- Won in 1967 Assembly Election from Yakutpura constituency
- Won in 1972 Assembly Election from Pathergatti constituency
- Won in 1978 Assembly Election with 51.98% of votes as an independent in Charminar constituency
- Won in 1983 Assembly Election with 64.05% of votes as an independent in Charminar constituency
- Won in 1984 Parliament Election with 38.13% of votes as an independent Hyderabad constituency
- Won in 1989 Parliament Election with 45.91% of votes for MIM party in Hyderabad constituency
- Won in 1991 Parliament Election with 46.18% of votes for AIMIM party in Hyderabad constituency
- Won in 1996 Parliament Election with 34.57% of votes for AIMIM party in Hyderabad constituency
- Won in 1998 Parliament Election with 44.65% of votes for AIMIM party in Hyderabad constituency
- Won in 1999 Parliament Election with 41.36% of votes for AIMIM party in Hyderabad

== Other roles ==
- 1985–96—Member, Consultative Committee, Ministry of Home Affairs
- 1996–97—Member, Committee on Home Affairs
- 1996–97—Member, Committee on Industry
- 1996–97—Member, Committee on Finance
- 1998–99—Member, Committee on Defence
