= All India Majlis-e-Ittehadul Muslimeen =

Political party in India

- Abbreviation: AIMIM
- Leader: Asaduddin Owaisi
- President: Asaduddin Owaisi
- General Secretary: Vacant
- Parliamentary Chairperson: Asaduddin Owaisi
- Lok Sabha Leader: Asaduddin Owaisi
- Founder: Nawab Bahadur Yar Jung Nawab Mahmood Nawaz Khan Qiledar
- Founded: 12 November 1927 (99 years ago); As Majlis-E-Ittehadul Muslimeen (MIM)
- Headquarters: 5-5-59, Darussalam Rd, Darus Salam, Ghosha Mahal North, Nampally, Hyderabad, India-500001
- Youth wing: Majlis Youth Brigade
- Ideology: Conservatism (Indian); Constitutionalism; Composite nationalism; Muslim minority rights; Faction: Dalit rights
- Political position: Centre-right to right-wing
- Colours: Green
- ECI status: State party
- Alliance: UPA (2008–2012); AIMIM+VBA (2019) (Maharashtra); BTP+ (2021–2022) (Gujarat); GDA (2025) (Bihar); BPM (2022) (Uttar Pradesh); People's Front (2021) (2021); AIADMK+ (2024) (Tamil Nadu); PDM (2024) (Uttar Pradesh)
- Seats in Rajya Sabha: 0 / 245
- Seats in Lok Sabha: 1 / 543
- Seats in State Legislative Assemblies & State Legislative Councils: Indian states Telangana Legislative Council 2 / 40 Telangana Legislative Assembly 7 / 119 Bihar Legislative Assembly 5 / 243 Maharashtra Legislative Assembly 1 / 288
- Number of states and union territories in government: 0 / 31

Election symbol
- Kite

Party flag
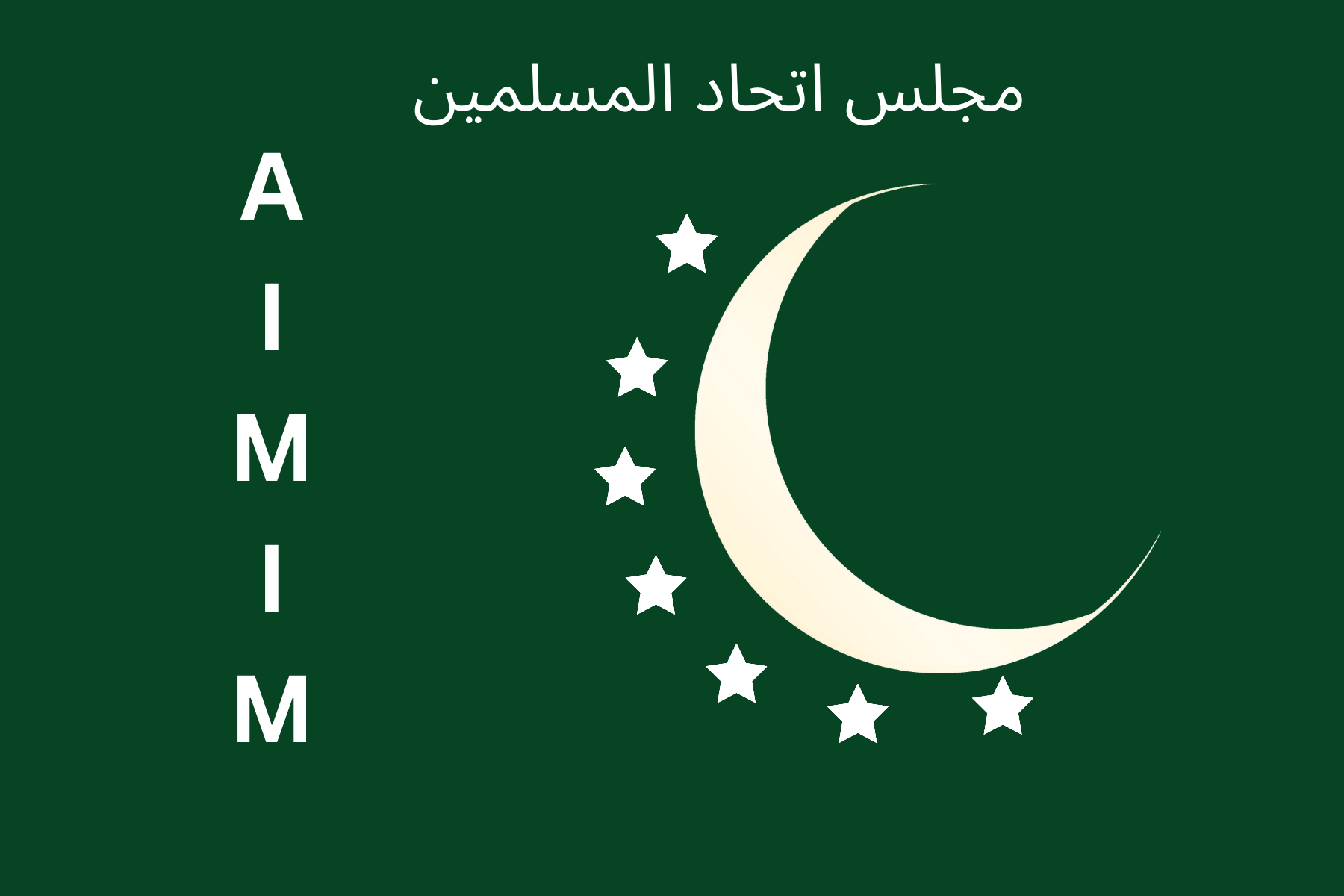

Website
- www.aimim.org

The All India Majlis-e-Ittehadul Muslimeen (AIMIM; lit. 'All India Council for Unity of Muslims'), or simply Majlis, is a right-wing Indian political party based primarily in the old city of Hyderabad and has a dominantly Muslim base. It is also a significant political party in the Indian states of Telangana, Maharashtra, Uttar Pradesh and Bihar.

AIMIM has held the Lok Sabha seats for the Hyderabad constituency since 1984. In the 2014 Telangana Legislative Assembly elections, the party won seven seats and received recognition as a "state party" by the Election Commission of India.

For much of its existence, it had little presence beyond old Hyderabad. However, in more recent years, it has begun expanding into other states. It now has a significant presence in Maharashtra, with Imtiyaz Jaleel winning the Aurangabad Lok Sabha constituency in 2019 and with multiple members elected to the Legislative Assembly. It has also made inroads in Bihar, winning five Legislative Assembly seats in 2020.

== Origins ==
AIMIM was originally founded as Majlis-e-Ittehadul Muslimeen (MIM) in 1927 by Nawab Bahadur Yar Jung, Nawab Mahmood Nawaz Khan Qiledar of Hyderabad State in the presence of Ulma-e-Mashaeqeen as a pro-partition party. The first meeting was held in the house of Nawaz Khan on 12 November 1927. In 1938, Bahadur Yar Jung was elected president of the MIM. At that time it had only a cultural and religious manifesto. It soon acquired a political complexion. After the death of Bahadur Yar Jang in 1944, Qasim Rizvi was elected as its leader. The Indian government, after police action (named Operation Polo), merged Hyderabad state with India and arrested Razakars including their leader Qasim Rizvi. He was released from jail in 1957 with condition that he will go to Pakistan.

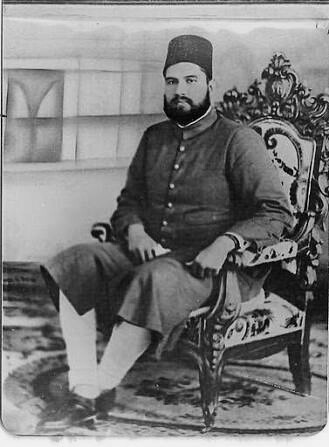
Qaaid-e-Millat Nawab Bahadur Yar Jung led MIM from 1938 to 1944

In 1958, before he left for Pakistan, Razvi nominated Abdul Wahid Owaisi as his successor. Abdul Wahed Owaisi, a lawyer organised the party into the All India Majlis-e-Ittehadul Muslimeen. Under his leadership, the AIMIM shifted from a hardline policy of independence to a pragmatic direction. After Abdul Wahed Owaisi, his son Sultan Salahuddin Owaisi took control of AIMIM in 1975 and was referred to as Salar-e-Millat (commander of the community). AIMIM President, Asaduddin Owaisi, his son claims that AIMIM is not the descendant of Razakars.

== In Indian politics ==
=== Telangana/Andhra Pradesh (Prior to Bifurcation) ===
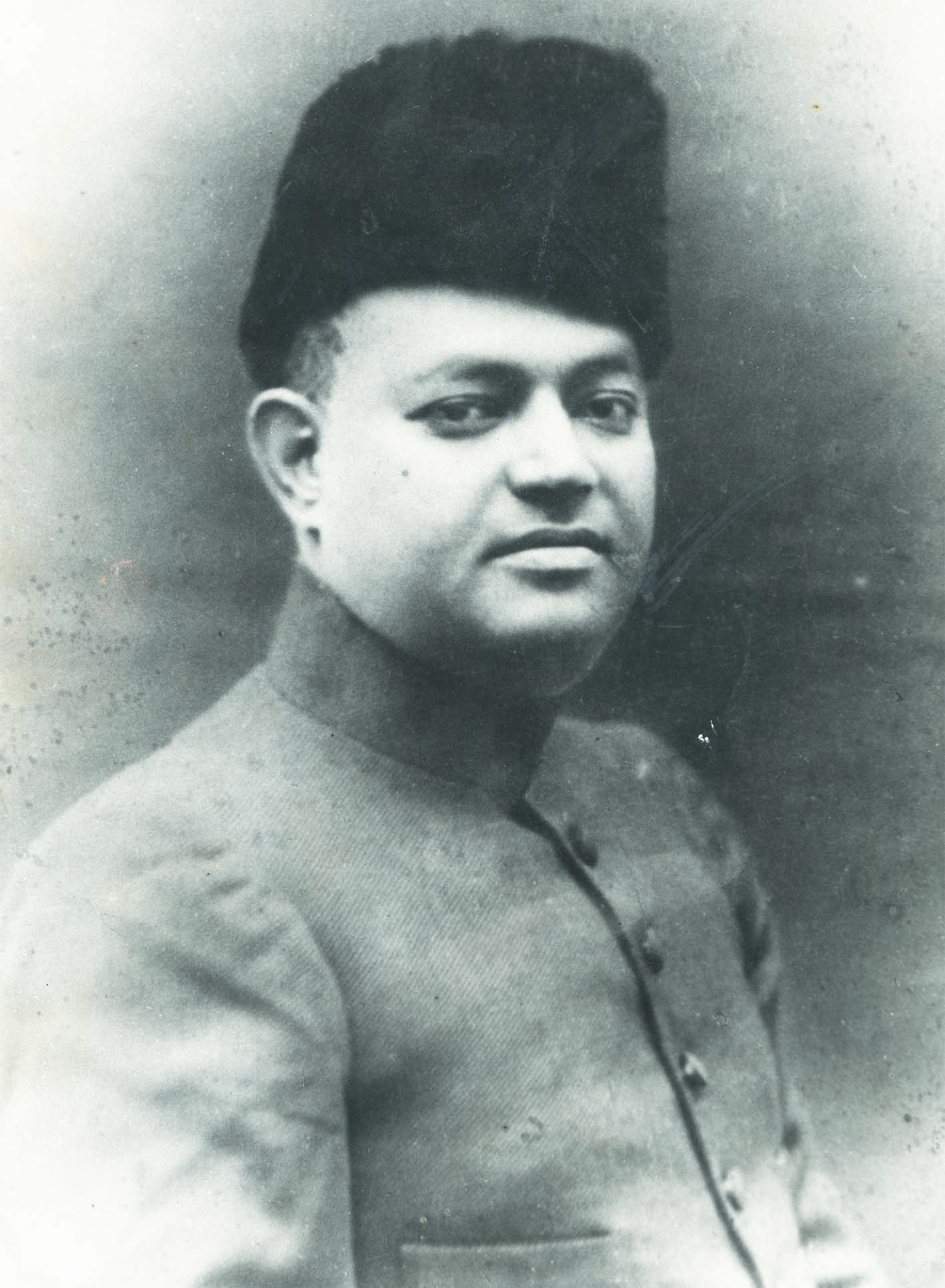
Abdul Wahid Owaisi – Revived AIMIM in 1958

In 1960, AIMIM won the Mallepally ward of Hyderabad Municipal Corporation. In 1962, Salahuddin won from Patharghatti assembly seat as an independent candidate and later from Charminar constituency in 1967. In 1972, he won from Yakutpura and later in 1978, again from Charminar. In 1984, Salahuddin emerged victorious in the central seat of Hyderabad, which he represented the seat until 2004. Mohammad Majid Hussain of the AIMIM was unanimously elected as the Mayor of Greater Hyderabad on 2 January 2012.

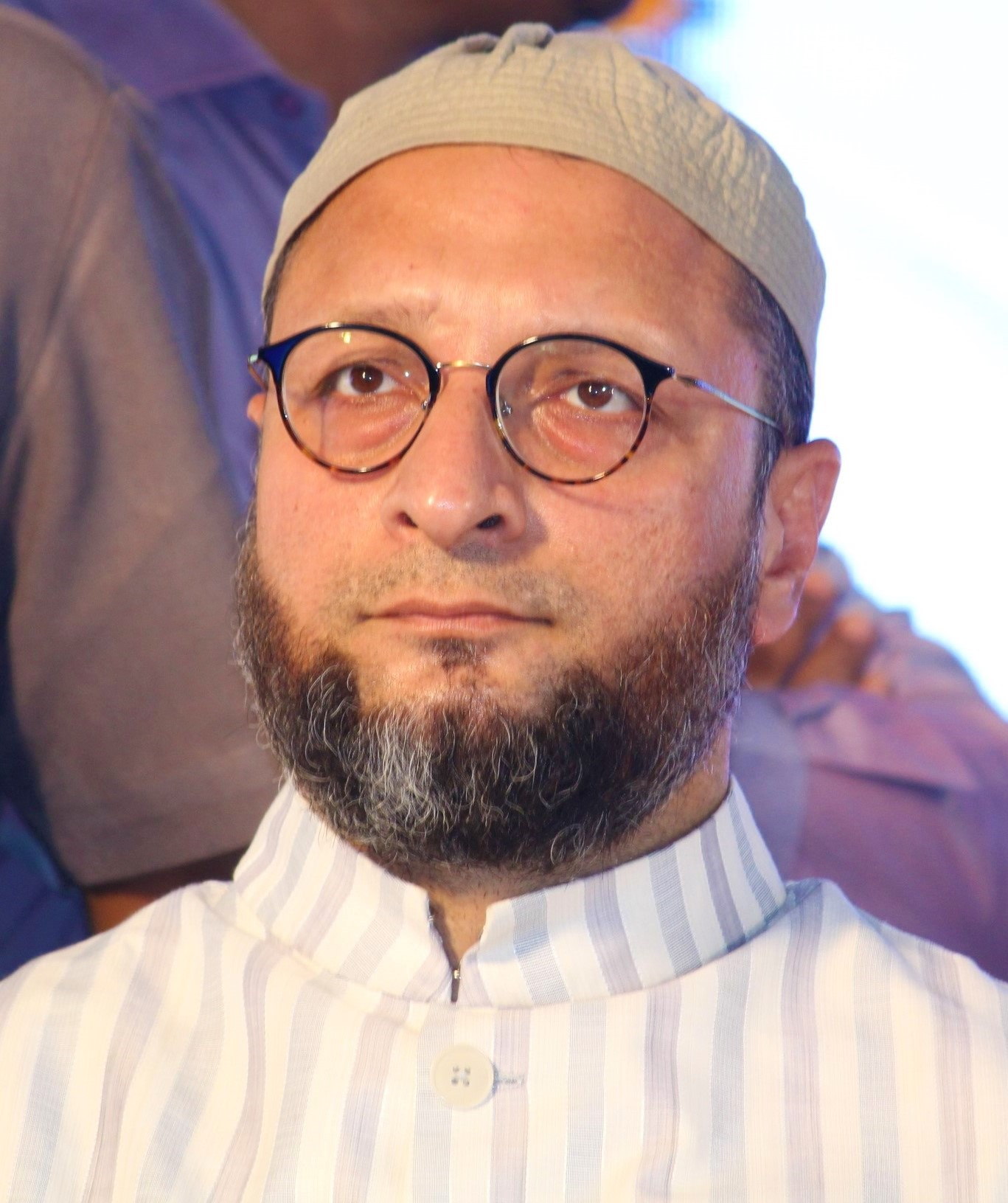
Current leader of the party Asaduddin Owaisi.

In 1993, AIMIM suffered a split, with a faction led by Amanullah Khan creating the Majlis Bachao Tehreek. As a result, AIMIM was reduced to a single Assembly seat in Andhra Pradesh in 1994. They won four seats in 1999, and increased their total to seven in 2009, where they have remained since then. They joined the Congress-led United Progressive Alliance in 2008, but left it in 2012. AIMIM have seven MLAs, two MLCs, one MP, 67 Municipal Corporators and 70 Councillors in Telangana.

=== Maharastra ===
In the 2014 Maharashtra Legislative Assembly election, the party won two seats from Aurangabad Central, Imtiyaz Jaleel won and from Byculla, Waris Pathan won.

In 2018, AIMIM allied with Prakash Ambedkar's Vanchit Bahujan Aghadi. AIMIM and VBA contested the 2019 Lok Sabha elections in Maharashtra in an alliance. VBA contested 47 seats and did not win any and AIMIM contested one seat which Imtiyaz Jaleel and won the Aurangabad seat, winning a seat for AIMIM outside Hyderabad for the first time ever. Jaleel lost in 2024 Lok Sabha election.

In the 2019 Maharashtra Legislative Assembly election, the party won two new seats from Malegaon Central Mufti Ismail and from Dhule City Shah Faruk Anwar.

In the 2024 Maharashtra Legislative Assembly election, the party won 1 seat from Malegaon Central Mufti Ismail.

==== Maharashtra Municipal Corporation Elections ====
Election Year	Seats contested	Seats won	± in seats	Remarks
Aurangabad Municipal Corporation Election
2015 (Debut)	54	26 / 113	▲26	
2020	55	25 / 113	▼1	
2026	20	33 / 115	▲8	
Amravati Municipal Corporation
2017 (Debut)	15	10 / 87	▲10	
2026	--	12 / 87	▲2	
Brihanmumbai Municipal Corporation
2017 (Debut)	—	2 / 227	▲2	
Dhule Municipal Corporation
2013 (Debut)		10 / 74	▲10	
2018		4 / 74	▼6	
Pune Municipal Corporation
2017 (Debut)	—	1 / 162	▲1	
Solapur Municipal Corporation
2012 (Debut)	15	9 / 113	▲9	
2017	15	9 / 113	0	
Thane Municipal Corporation
2017 (Debut)	—	2 / 131	▲2	

=== Bihar ===
Former RJD and JD(U) leader and Kochadhaman MLA Akhtarul Iman joined AIMIM in 2015, he was made state president of the party in Bihar. Akhtarul Iman contested 2015 Bihar Assembly Elections from Kochadhaman seat on AIMIM ticket against seating JD(U) MLA and Mahagathbandhan Candidate Mujahid Alam. Iman's popularity in his home constituency could not win him election in 2015 due to strong favour of Muslims voters towards Mahagathbandhan candidates. State President Akhtarul Iman contested from Kishanganj Lok Sabha on AIMIM ticket in the 2019 Indian general election. In triangular contest among Akhtarul Iman, Congress candidate Dr. Jawaid Azad and JD(U) candidate Mahmood Ashraf, Dr. Jawaid Azad won the elections with a comfortable margin and Akhtarul Iman was at third position.

Later that year, Qamrul Hoda won the by-election from Kishanganj Assembly Constituency on the AIMIM ticket defeating Congress candidate Dr. Jawaid Azad's mother. The seat was left vacant after Dr. Jawaid Azad's victory in the Lok Sabha election. Qamrul Huda is the first elected MLA of AIMIM in Bihar. He lost his seat in 2020 Assembly Elections.

AIMIM contested the 2020 Bihar Legislative Assembly election as part of the Grand Democratic Secular Front. The party won five seats in the Seemanchal region, with Iman winning from Amour, Ruknuddin Ahmed from Baisi, Izhar Asfi from Kochdhaman, Anzar Nayeemi from Bahadurganj and Shahnawaz Alam from Jokihat.

==== Party Division In Bihar ====
On 29 June 2022, 4 out of 5 AIMIM MLAs joined RJD in the presence of Lalu Prasad Yadav leaving behind Amour MLA Akhtarul Iman as the only AIMIM MLA in Bihar.

In an exclusive interview with Main Media after party break-up, Akhtarul Iman blamed Jokihat MLA for their action. He also claimed that every MLA was given huge sum of money in exchange for joining RJD.

=== Remergence ===
AIMIM won 5 seats in 2025 Bihar Legislative Assembly election.

=== Uttar Pradesh ===
In the 2017 Uttar Pradesh Local Body elections, AIMIM secured victory in 32 seats. However, in the 2022 Uttar Pradesh Legislative Assembly election AIMIM faced a significant setback as the party did not win any of the 100 seats it contested. In several constituencies, AIMIM's presence had an impact on the distribution of votes among secular parties, indirectly contributing to BJP's success. however Bahujan Samaj Party contested 403 and only one seat, Congress contested 399 seats and won only 2 seat where Aam Admi Party contested 349 did not win any seats

On 31 March 2024 AIMIM and Apna Dal (K) announced an alliance in Uttar Pradesh for the Lok Sabha elections.

=== Gujarat ===
AIMIM made an impressive debut in the election for the Amdavad Municipal Corporation. They contested 21 seats and won 7. AIMIM panel won all seats in the Jamalpur and Maktampura Wards. All 7 seats AIMIM won came at the cost of Congress, these seats belonged to Congress since 2015. After a few days, AIMIM likely contested the Gujarat Municipality election, which he succeeded. The party won 9 seats in Modasa, eight in Godhra and two seats in Bharuch. Later, AIMIM wonthe Bharuch municipality ward no 10 by-election by 1,400 votes.

=== Karnataka ===
AIMIM won 4 corporator seats in the Karnataka Municipal Corporation elections: 3 in Hubli and 1 in Belagavi. In the municipality elections, AIMIM secured 4 councillor seats: 2 in Bidar, 2 in Kolar, and 2 in Vijayapura Corporation.

=== Tamil Nadu ===
AIMIM opened its account in Tamil Nadu by winning two seats of the 16 wards it contested in Vaniyambadi municipal elections 2022. Tamil Nadu is the fourth state in south India after Telangana, Andhra Pradesh and Karnataka to have AIMIM representation in municipal bodies.

=== Rajasthan ===
AIMIM contested in 10 seats in the 2023 Rajasthan Legislative Assembly Elections. The party has fielded candidates in Hawa Mahal, Kishanpole, Adarsh Nagar, Kaman, Kishangarh Bas, Baytoo, Makrana, Fatehpur, Gangapur City and Sawai Madhopur.

== Electoral performance ==
=== General elections ===
Lok Sabha
Election year	Overall votes	% of overall vote	Seats contested	Seats won	+/– in seats	Alliance
1989	403,625	0.21%	1	1	1 ▲	
1991	454,823	0.16%	1	1	Steady	
1996	340,070	0.1%	1	1	Steady	
1998	485,785	0.13%	1	1	Steady	
1999	448,165	0.12%	1	1	Steady	
2004	378,854	0.1%	1	1	Steady	
2009	308,061	0.07%	1	1	Steady	UPA
2014	685,730	0.12%	5	1	Steady	
2019	1,201,542	0.20%	3	2	1 ▲	
2024	1,400,215	0.22%	15	1	▼1	PDM in Uttar Pradesh

=== State Assembly Elections ===
Election Year	Overall votes	% of overall votes	Seats contested	Seats won	± in seats	Alliance
Andhra Pradesh Legislative Assembly
1989 (Debut)	571,757	1.99%	35	4 / 294	▲4	
1994	216,838	0.7%	20	1 / 294	▼3	
1999	360,211	1.05%	5	4 / 294	▲3	
2004	375,165	1.05%	7	4 / 294	Steady	
2009	349,896	0.83%	8	7 / 294	▲3	
Bihar Legislative Assembly
2015 (Debut)	80,248	0.2%	6	0 / 243	Steady	
2020	523,279	1.24%	20	5 / 243	▲5	GDSF
2025	930,504	1.85	25	5 / 243	Steady	GDA
Gujarat Legislative Assembly
2022 (Debut)	93,313	0.29%	13	0 / 182	Steady	
Jharkhand Legislative Assembly
2019 (Debut)	173,980	1.16%	0	0 / 81	Steady	
2024		0.11%	0	0 / 81	Steady	
Maharashtra Legislative Assembly
2014 (Debut)	489,614	0.93%	24	2 / 288	▲2	
2019	737,888	1.34%	44	2 / 288	Steady	
2024	550,902	0.85%	17	1 / 288	▼1	
Tamil Nadu Legislative Assembly
2016 (Debut)	10,117	0.02%	2	0 / 234	Steady	
2021	3,134	0.01%	3	0 / 234	Steady	AMMK+
Telangana Legislative Assembly
2014 (New State Assembly)	737,134	1.52%	35	7 / 119	▲7	
2018	561,089	2.7%	8	7 / 119	Steady	
2023	519,379	2.22%	9	7 / 119	Steady	
Uttar Pradesh Legislative Assembly
2017 (Debut)	204,142	0.24%	38	0 / 403	Steady	
2022	450,929	0.49%	95	0 / 403	Steady	BPM
Uttarakhand Legislative Assembly
2022 (Debut)	1,687	0.03%	4	0 / 70	Steady	
West Bengal Legislative Assembly
2021 (Debut)	10,852	0.02%	6	0 / 294	Steady	
Madhya Pradesh Legislative Assembly
2023(Debut)	38,616	0.09%	4	0 / 230	Steady	
Rajasthan Legislative Assembly
2023(Debut)	4,342		10	0 / 200	Steady	
Delhi Legislative Assembly
2025 (Debut)	73,032	0.77%	2	0 / 70	Steady	

== Leadership ==
All State Presidents, National Spokespersons and important people of Majlis.

Portrait	Name	Party Post	Legislature Post	Ref.
Asad Owaisi	Asaduddin Owaisi	National President	Member of Parliament; Hyderabad	
	Vacant	General Secretary	-	
Waris Pathan	Waris Pathan	National Spokesperson	Ex-MLA; Byculla, Maharashtra	
	Syed Asim Waqar	National Spokesperson	None	
Akbar Owaisi	Akbaruddin Owaisi	Telangana Assembly; Floor Leader	MLA; Chandrayangutta, Hyderabad	
	Usman Ghani Humnabad	Karnataka President		
	Abdul Rahim Khan	Tamil Nadu President		
Sabirbhai Kauliwala	Sabirbhai Kabuliwala	Gujarat President	Ex-MLA; Jamalpur-Khadiya, Gujrat	
	Jameel Ahmed Khan	Rajasthan President	--	
Imtiaz Jaleel	Imtiyaz Jaleel	Maharashtra President	Ex-Member of Parliament; Aurangabad	
Mohseen Ali Khan	Mohseen Ali Khan	Madhya Pradesh President	--	
Mohammad Shakir Ansari	Mohammad Shakir Ansari	Jharkhand President		
Akhtarul Iman	Akhtarul Iman	Bihar President	MLA; Amour, Bihar	
	Dr. Shoib Jamai	Delhi President		
	Shaukat Ali	Uttar Pradesh President		
	Nayyer Kazmi	Uttrakhand President		

== Headquarters ==
The main party office is located within Darussalam, where Deccan College of Engineering and Technology, Deccan School of Pharmacy, Deccan School of Planning and Architecture, and Deccan School of Management are also located. The Indian Etemaad Press Office is also situated adjacent to the engineering college. The open grounds on the campus are also used from time to time to organise political gatherings (termed as "jalsa") where the party leaders deliver speeches to public and media alike.

== List of National Presidents ==
No.	Portrait	Name (Birth–Death)	Term in office		
No.	Portrait	Name (Birth–Death)	Assumed office	Left office	Time in office
1		Abdul Wahed Owaisi	c. 1958	c. 1983	25 years, 0 days
2		Sultan Salahuddin Owaisi (1931–2008)	c. 1983	29 September 2008	25 years, 272 days
3		Asaduddin Owaisi (born 1969)	29 September 2008	Incumbent	18 years, 54 days

== Non-Muslim candidates ==
AIMIM has occasionally fielded Hindus in various assembly and local body elections. In 1986 the first Dalit Mayor of Municipal Corporation Hyderabad Kalra Prakash Rao, then Anumula Satyanarayana a Hindu Mayor in 1987. The AIMIM selected Alampally Pochiah as its First Mayor in the city. MIM had three Hindu Hyderabad mayors- K. Prakash Rao, A. Satyanarayana and Alampalli Pochaiah. A Muralidhar Reddy, Hindu candidate being fielded for an assembly seat by Majlis-e-Ittehadul Muslimeen from Rajendranagar constituency.

In 2013 local elections the party fielded a woman candidate from Hindu OBC, V. Bhanumathi, who won election against Hajira Sultana from Congress by 1,282 votes.

AIMIM announced 19 Hindus candidates in various assembly seats in 2022 Uttar Pradesh Legislative Assembly election, with Pandit Manmohan Jha Gama being the first one.

=== Lok Sabha 2024 ===
The seats which the AIMIM has decided to contest are Patliputra, Sheohar, Gopalganj, Maharajganj, Madhubani, Jehanabad, Karakat, Motihari, Muzaffarpur and Valmiki Nagar.

== Philanthropy ==
- AIMIM donated relief worth ₹ 78.75 lakh for 2013 Uttarakhand floods victims in 2013.
- AIMIM donated over ₹50,000,000 in aid to the 2017 Bihar flood victims in August 2017.
- During the 2018 floods in Kerala, AIMIM donated 1,60,00,000 rupees and 1,000,000 Lakh rupees worth medicines.
- During the 2020 Delhi riots, AIMIM organised two medical relief camps in Delhi and donated medicines worth ₹4,000,000. Asaduddin Owaisi announced that all elected representatives of AIMIM will donate one month of their salary for those affected by the Delhi riots.
- AIMIM donated ₹2,000,000 for Injured of Moradabad, Uttar Pradesh road accident.

== See also ==
- Politics of India
- Hyderabad State Praja Party
- Majlis Bachao Tehreek
- List of political parties in India
- List of Islamic political parties
