= 2016 Greater Hyderabad Municipal Corporation election =

- 2 February 2016

All 150 elected seats in the Greater Hyderabad Municipal Corporation 76 seats needed for a majority
- Turnout: 45.71% (▲2.67)
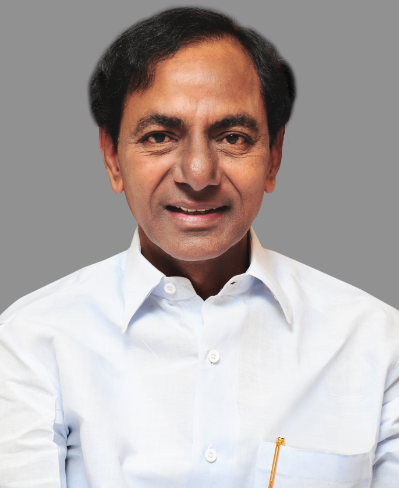

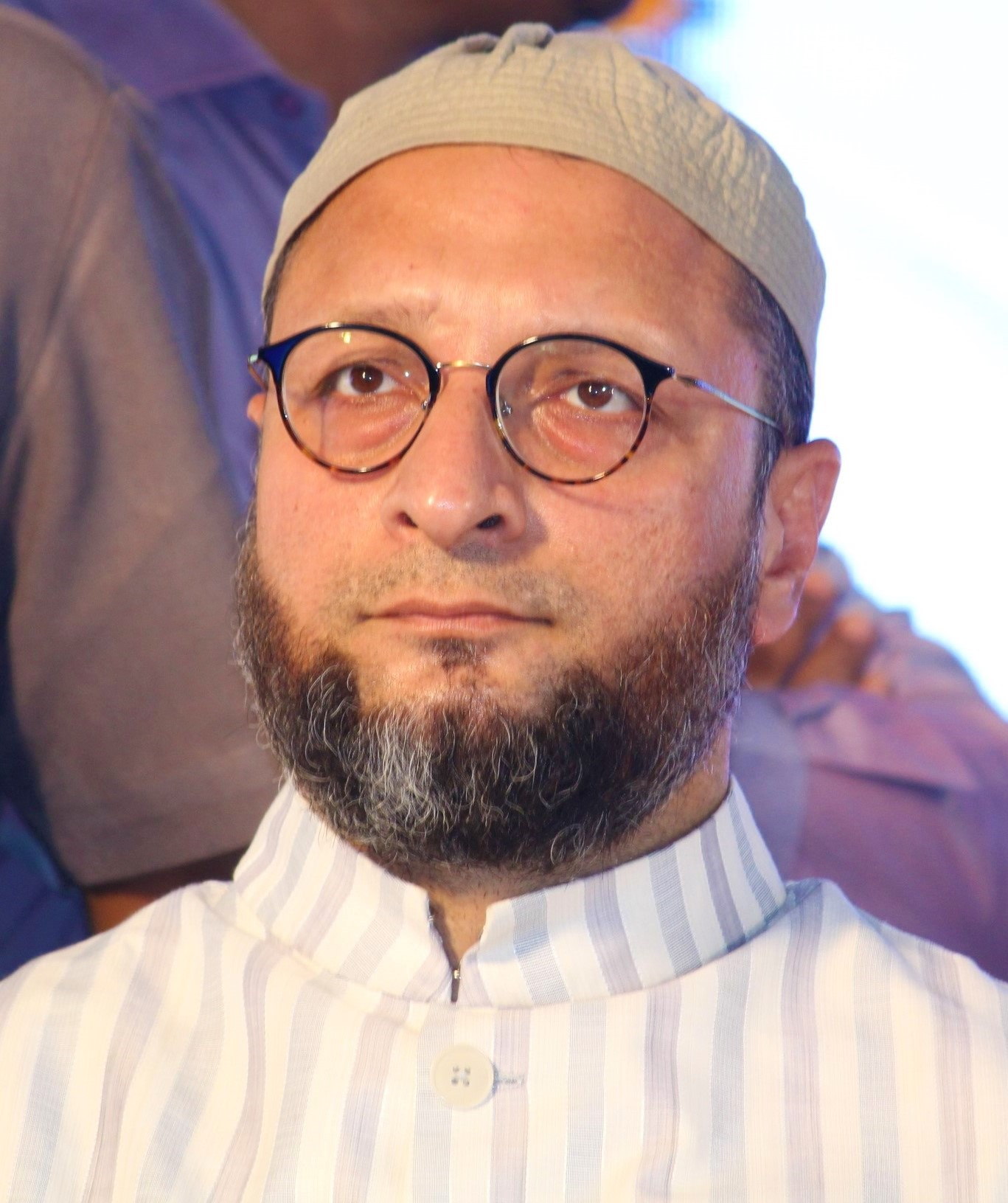

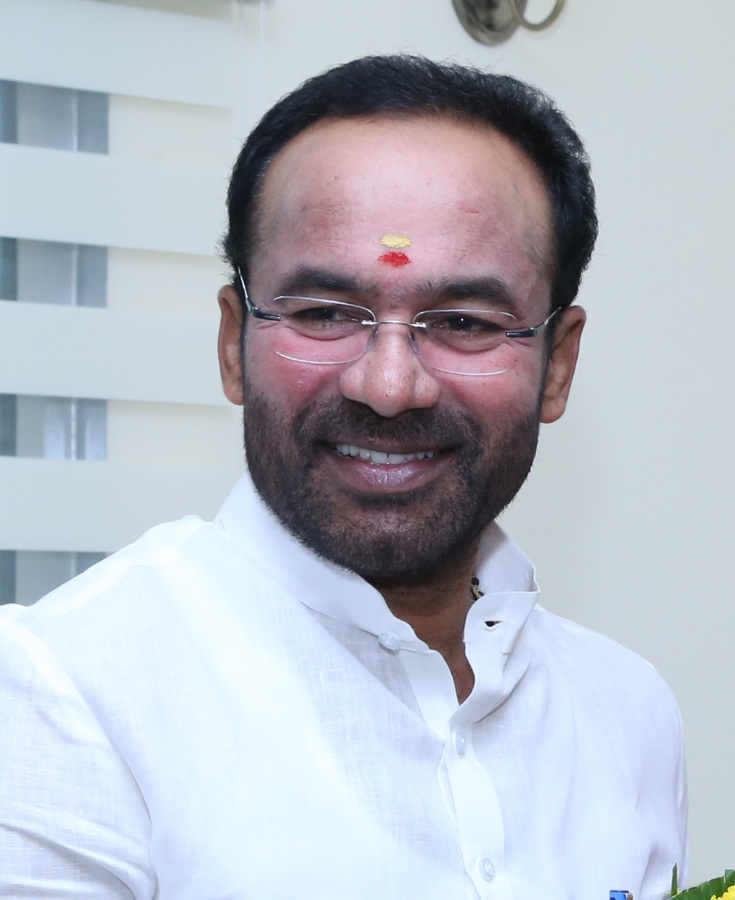

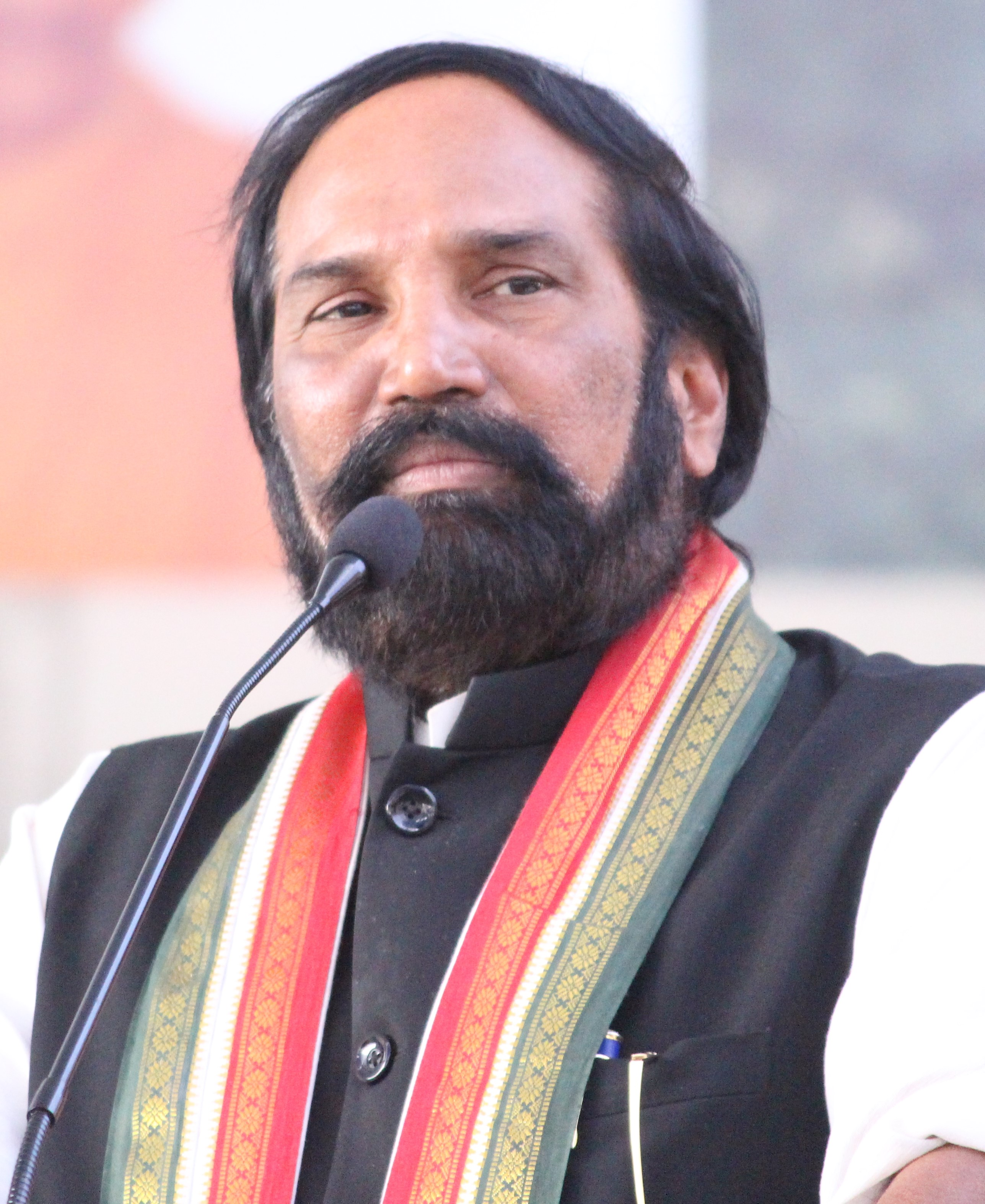

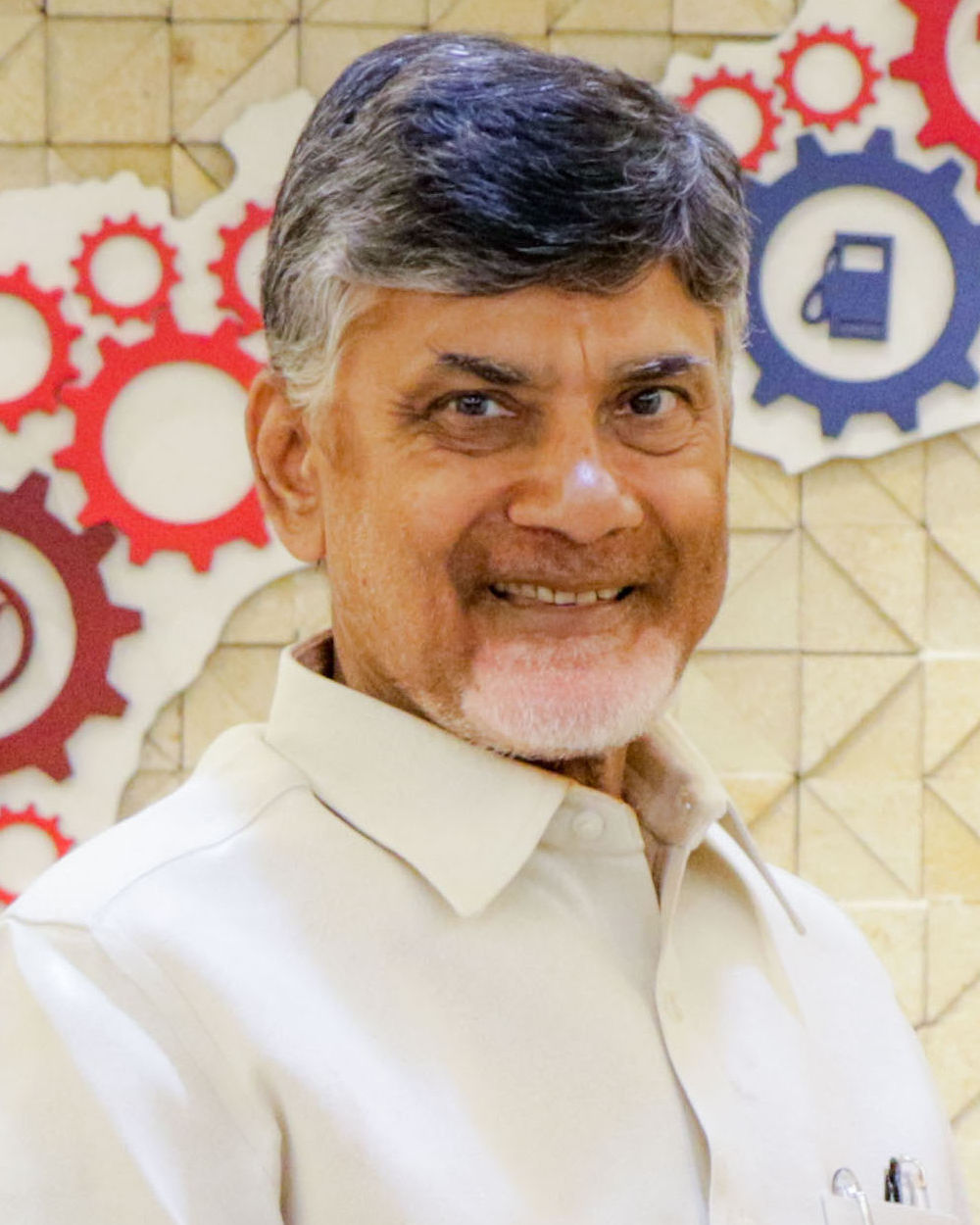
	First party	Second party	Third party
Leader	Kalvakuntla Chandrashekhar Rao	Asaduddin Owaisi	G. Kishan Reddy
Party	TRS	AIMIM	BJP
Alliance	None	None	NDA
Last election	Did not contest	43	5
Seats won	99	44	4
Seat change	▲99	▲1	▼1
Popular vote	1,468,618	530,812	346,523
Percentage	43.85%	15.85%	10.34%
Swing	▲43.85	▲1.41	▲0.37
	Fourth party	Fifth party
Leader	N. Uttam Kumar Reddy	N. Chandrababu Naidu
Party	INC	TDP
Alliance	None	NDA
Last election	52	45
Seats won	2	1
Seat change	▼50	▼44
Popular vote	348,388	439,047
Percentage	10.40%	13.11%
Swing	▼18.00	▼14.92
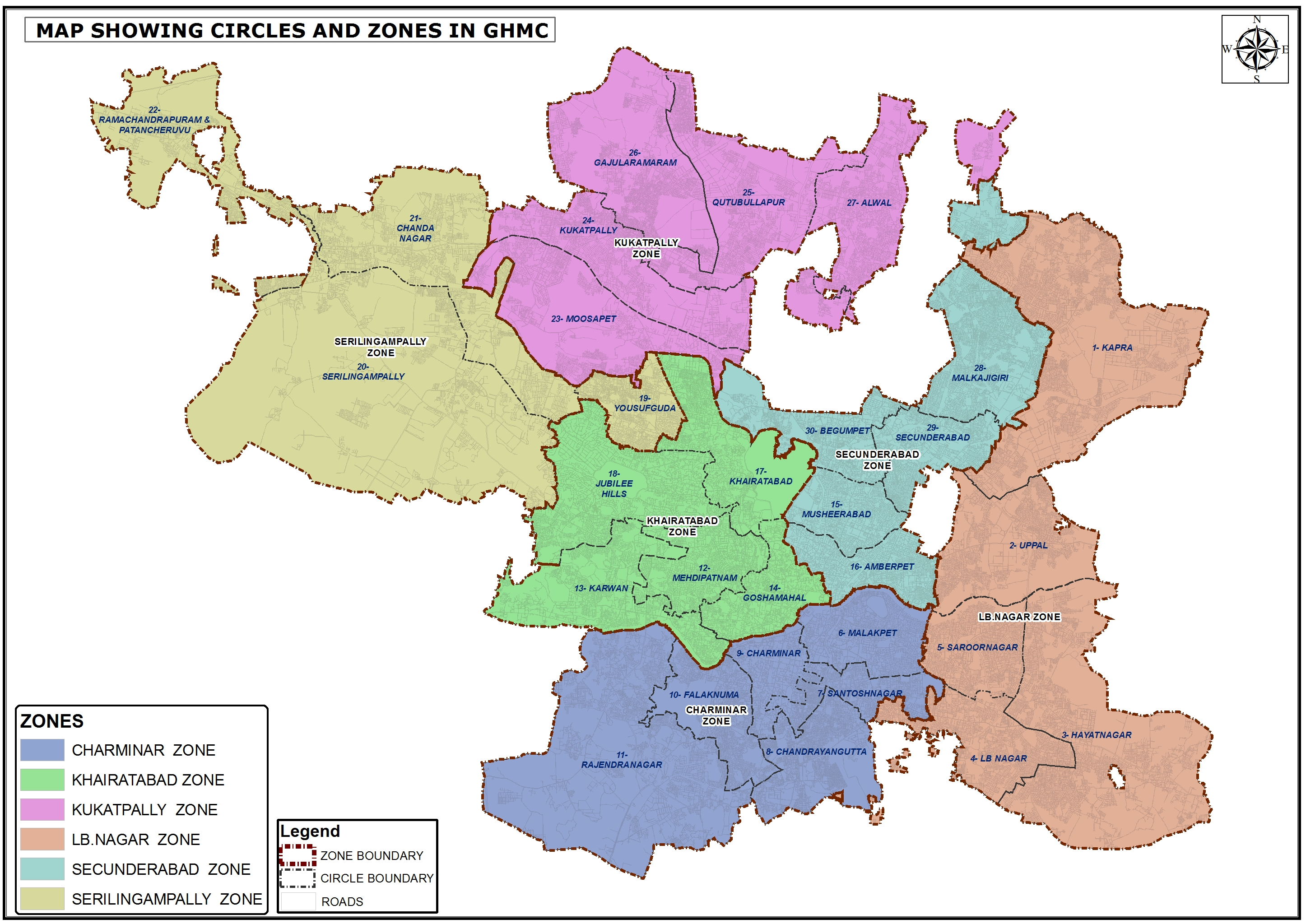
Mayor before election
Vacant
Elected Mayor
Bonthu Rammohan
Telangana Rashtra Samiti

The 2016 Greater Hyderabad Municipal Corporation election was conducted on 2 February 2016 to elect members to all 150 wards of the municipal corporation. The Telangana Rashtra Samithi won a landslide victory of 99 wards, followed by the All India Majlis-e-Ittehadul Muslimeen which received 44 wards. The Indian National Congress, which was the single-largest party in the previous GHMC elections held in 2010, was decimated, winning only 2 wards.

== Election schedule ==
The Telangana State Election Commission announced the schedule for the GHMC election on 7 January 2016.

Event	Date
Date of notification	12 January 2016
Last date for filing nominations	17 January 2016
Date for scrutiny of nominations	18 January 2016
Last date for withdrawal of candidatures	21 January 2016
Date of poll	2 February 2016
Date of counting	5 February 2016

== Results ==
=== Results by alliance and party ===
Party	TRS	AIMIM	BJP	INC	TDP
Seats	99	44	4	2	1
Alliance	TRS	AIMIM	NDA	UPA
Seats	99	44	5	2

The results were announced on 5 February 2016, the Telangana Rashtra Samithi won a strong majority of 99 seats in the municipal corporation, riding on the wave of achieving the independent state of Telangana after years of protests and hunger strikes. The All India Majlis-e-Ittehadul Muslimeen retained its old city bastion whereas the main parties in the last election, the Indian National Congress and the Telugu Desam Party were decimated, with most of their voters switching to the TRS. Almost 1,000 of the total 1,333 candidates lost their deposit, failing to garner 1/6th of the total vote.

=== Results by party ===
Parties and Coalitions	Popular vote		Seats	
Parties and Coalitions	Vote	%	Won	+/-
Telangana Rashtra Samithi (TRS)	1,468,618	43.85%	99	▲99
All India Majlis-e-Ittehadul Muslimeen (AIMIM)	530,812	15.85%	44	▲1
Bharatiya Janata Party (BJP)	346,523	10.34%	4	▼1
Indian National Congress (INC)	348,388	10.40%	2	▼50
Telugu Desam Party (TDP)	439,047	13.11%	1	▼44
Others	215,991	6.45%	0	▼5
Total	3,349,379	100.00	150	

=== Results by ward ===
Results
Ward		Winner			Runner Up			Margin
#	Name	Candidate	Party	Votes	Candidate	Party	Votes	Margin
1	Kapra	S. Swarna Raj	TRS	10112	KVLN Rao	TDP	5083	5029
2	A. S. Rao Nagar	Pajjuri Pavani Reddy	TRS	7987	Tateneni Samrajyam	BJP	6621	1366
3	Cherlapally	Bonthu Rammohan	TRS	13462	Ganesh M.	BJP	5593	7869
4	Meerpet HB Colony	Golluri Anjaiah	TRS	12319	Anumula Dinesh	BJP	6611	5708
5	Mallapur	Devender Reddy Pannala	TRS	12929	B. Lakshmi Naraayana	TDP	5040	7889
6	Nacharam	Shanti Shekar Chitipolu	INC	8236	Jyothi Medala	TRS	8084	152
7	Chilukanagar	Gopu Saraswathi	TRS	13055	Chenreddy Latha	INC	5073	7982
8	Habsiguda	Bethi Swapna Reddy	TRS	12567	Bobbala Rama	TDP	5099	7468
9	Ramanthapur	Gandham Jyosthna	TRS	10396	Sarva Rani	IND	5239	5157
10	Uppal	Anala Reddy Mekala	TRS	10510	M. Rajitha	IND	9364	1146
11	Nagole	Cheruku Sangeetha	TRS	12915	Chinthala Aruna	TDP	6838	6077
12	Mansoorabad	Koppula Vittal Reddy	TRS	12736	Koppula Narasimha Reddy	TDP	6787	5949
13	Hayaathnagar	S. Tirumala Reddy	TRS	10598	Kallem Ravinder Reddy	BJP	7825	2773
14	BN Reddy Nagar	Muddagouni Laxmi Prasanna	TRS	12743	Katikareddy Aravind Reddy	TDP	6184	6559
15	Vanasthalipuram	Jitta Rajasekhar Reddy	TRS	13691	Sama Prabhakar Reddy	TDP	5410	8281
16	Hastinapuram	Ramavath Padma	TRS	12220	N. Pravalika	INC	3102	9118
17	Champapet	S. Ramana Reddy	TRS	8938	Vanga Madhusudhan Reddy	BJP	8792	146
18	Lingojiguda	Srinivasa Rao Mudraboina	TRS	12341	Darpally Rajashekhar Reddy	INC	5005	7336
19	Saroornagar	P. Anitha Reddy	TRS	12493	Akhila Akula	TDP	6282	6211
20	Ramakrishnapuram	Radha Veerannagari	BJP	12216	T. Anitha Reddy	TRS	10254	1962
21	Kothapet	GV Sagar Reddy	TRS	10583	Rahul Goud Lingala	INC	5385	5198
22	Chaitanyapuri	G. Vittal Reddy	TRS	8311	Y. Venkat Gandhi	TDP	3806	4505
23	Gaddiannaram	Bhavani Praveen Kumar	TRS	12601	Gandi Krishna Yadav	TDP	6469	6132
24	Saidabad	Swarna Latha Singireddy	TRS	13042	S. Shailaja Reddy	BJP	4765	8277
25	Moosrambagh	T. Sunaritha	TRS	13134	B. Jamuna	TDP	7420	5714
26	Old Malakpet	Juweria Fatima	AIMIM	9001	Saya Bhuvaneshwari	TRS	6260	2741
27	Akberbagh	Syed Minhajuddin	AIMIM	6239	Tella Mahesh Kumar Srinivas	TRS	5458	781
28	Azampura	Ayesha Jahan Naseem	AIMIM	8253	Asma Khatoon	MBT	6682	1571
29	Chavni	Mohammed Murtaza Ali	AIMIM	12122	Mohammed Ajmaluddin Farooqi	MBT	2783	9339
30	Dabeerpura	Mirza Riyazul Hussain Effendi	AIMIM	10815	Mohammed Abdul Zeeshan	TRS	4341	6474
31	Rain Bazar	Mir Wajid Ali Khan	AIMIM	9932	Mohammed Aijaz	TRS	1833	8099
32	Pathergatti	Syed Sohail Quadri	AIMIM	16458	Mirza Baqer Ali	TRS	3307	13151
33	Moghalpura	Amtul Aleem	AIMIM	8810	P. Veeramani	TRS	2647	6163
34	Talabchanchalam	Nasreen Sultana	AIMIM	13337	Ayesha	IND	1842	11495
35	Gowlipura	Ale Lalitha	BJP	10505	K. Meena	TRS	9076	1429
36	Lalithabagh	Mohammed Ali Sharif	AIMIM	8557	G. Raghavendra Raju	TRS	5514	3043
37	Kurmaguda	Sameena Begum	AIMIM	9889	Lavanya Kusiri	BJP	5679	4120
38	IS Sadan	Sama Swapna	TRS	15052	Sunitha Kontham	BJP	3644	11408
39	Santoshnagar	Mohammed Muzaffar Hussain	AIMIM	11886	Mohammed Nawaz Ali	TRS	2865	9021
40	Riyasath Nagar	Mirza Mustafa Baig	AIMIM	9475	Mohammed Yousuf	TRS	5254	4221
41	Kanchanbagh	Reshma Fatima	AIMIM	10528	Farheen Sultana	MBT	4235	6293
42	Barkas	Shabana Begum	AIMIM	9408	Chennaiagari Saritha	TRS	2515	6893
43	Chandrayangutta	Abdul Wahab	AIMIM	8965	Jurki Rajendar Kumar	BJP	3202	5763
44	Uppuguda	Fahad bin Abdul Samad	AIMIM	8777	Thadem Srinivas Rao	BJP	4341	4436
45	Jangammet	Mohammed Abdul Rahman	AIMIM	7131	Muppidi Seetha Ram Reddy	TRS	5934	1197
46	Falaknuma	K. Thara Bhai	AIMIM	13956	Sabavath Srinivas	TRS	2569	13387
47	Nawab Saheb Kunta	Shireen Khatoon	AIMIM	13492	Farhath Sultana	TRS	1536	11956
48	Shali Banda	Mohammed Mustafa Ali	AIMIM	11780	Ponna Venkata Ramanna	BJP	4582	7198
49	Ghansi Bazar	Renu Soni	BJP	10139	Sameena Begum	AIMIM	9280	859
50	Begum Bazaar	G. Shanker Yadav	BJP	15850	Ramesh Kumar Bung	TRS	8415	7435
51	Goshamahal	G. Mukesh Singh	TRS	8555	Laxman Singh Jamedhar	BJP	8477	78
52	Puranapool	Sunnam Raj Mohan	AIMIM	8554	Mohammed Ghouse	INC	5676	2878
53	Doodbowli	M. A. Gaffar	AIMIM	10267	M. A. Wahab	TDP	2671	7596
54	Jahanuma	Khaja Mubasheeruddin	AIMIM	15278	Khaja Gayas Uddin	INC	1560	13718
55	Ramanastpura	Mohammed Mubeen	AIMIM	13964	Mohammed Jameel Ahamed	TRS	1414	12550
56	Kishanbagh	Mohammed Saleem	AIMIM	12649	Mohammed Shakeel Ahmed	TRS	4361	8288
57	Suleman Nagar	Abida Sultana	AIMIM	15410	Saritha Airva	TRS	2430	12980
58	Shastripuram	Mohammed Misbah Uddin	AIMIM	12486	Banda Rajesh Yadav	TRS	3137	9349
59	Mylardevpally	Tokala Srinivas Reddy	TRS	18259	T. Premdas Goud	BJP	12785	5474
60	Rajendra Nagar	Korani Srilatha	TRS	10542	Bathula S. Divya	INC	6544	3998
61	Attapur	Ravula Vijaya	TRS	13155	Cheruku Madhavi	TDP	5376	7779
62	Ziaguda	A. Krishna	TRS	10941	Adirala Munedae	BJP	7179	3762
63	Manghalhat	Parmeshwari Singh	TRS	14293	R. Urmila Devi	TDP	4917	9376
64	Dattathreyanagar	Mohammed Yousuf	AIMIM	10315	Mohammed Aqeel Ahmed	TRS	2873	7442
65	Karwan	M. Rajender Yadav	AIMIM	9131	Channa Narender Dev	TRS	8558	573
66	Lunger House	Amina Begum	AIMIM	7737	Bhagya Lakshmi	TRS	7435	302
67	Golkonda	Hafsiya Hanseef	AIMIM	14236	Arshiya Khan	TRS	4851	9385
68	Tolichowki	Dr. Ayesha Humera	AIMIM	10866	Farzana Begum	INC	1881	8985
69	Nanalnagar	Mohammed Naseer Uddin	AIMIM	12067	Shaik Azhar	TRS	6052	6015
70	Mehdipatnam	Mohammed Majid Hussain	AIMIM	5356	C. Ashok Kumar	TRS	2230	3126
71	Gudimalkapur	Bangari Prakash	TRS	12685	Devara Karunakar	BJP	7117	5568
72	Asif Nagar	Fahmina Anjum	AIMIM	10501	Gundoji Laxmama	TRS	5709	4792
73	Vijayanagar Colony	Salma Ameen	AIMIM	8604	B. Chandrakala	TRS	6318	2286
74	Ahmed Nagar	Ayesha Rubina	AIMIM	12378	Asmath Unnisa	TRS	5731	6647
75	Red Hills	Ayesha Fatima	AIMIM	7652	Saritha Margam	TRS	6415	1237
76	Mallepally	Tarannum Naaz	AIMIM	10601	Kolluru Usha Sree	BJP	6041	4560
77	Jambagh	D. Mohan	AIMIM	8583	M. Anand Goud	TRS	8578	5
78	Gunfoundry	M. Mamatha	TRS	10536	M. Saritha Goud	BJP	6984	3552
79	Himayathnagar	Jadala Hemalatha Yadav	TRS	10021	Mahalakshmi Gnvk	BJP	8329	1692
80	Kachiguda	Aekkala Chaitanya Kanna	TRS	10317	K. Uma Rani	BJP	8506	1811
81	Nallakunta	Gariganti Sridevi	TRS	15656	Vanam Malathi	TDP	5181	10475
82	Golnaka	Kaleru Padma	TRS	14314	Akkala Sharadha	BJP	8347	5967
83	Amberpet	Jagan Puli	TRS	9782	Mohammed	AIMIM	7316	2466
84	Bagh Amberpet	Kuchalakanti Padmavathi	TRS	11555	Banappagari Padma	BJP	6699	4856
85	Adikmet	B. Hemalatha	TRS	11266	K. Prasanna	BJP	4916	6350
86	Musheerabad	Edla Bhagya Laxmi	TRS	10434	Machanpally Supriya	IND	6313	4121
87	Ramnagar	V. Srinivas Reddy	TRS	16968	Prabhakar Reddy M.	BJP	5465	11503
88	Bholakpur	Mohammed Akeel Ahmed	AIMIM	10695	R. Rama Rao	TRS	7786	2909
89	Gandhinagar	Muta Padma Naresh	TRS	11776	T. Sailaja	BJP	6672	5104
90	Kavadiguda	G. Lasya Nanditha	TRS	16148	R. Rajasri	TDP	4760	11388
91	Khairtabad	P. Vijaya Reddy	TRS	16341	M. Sangeetha	TDP	3968	12373
92	Venkateshwara Colony	Kavitha Reddy Manne	TRS	11837	Bangaru Sravathi	BJP	3656	8181
93	Banjara Hills	Gadwal Vijayalakshmi	TRS	12704	Mechineni Srinivas Rao	BJP	5197	7507
94	Shaikhpet	Mohammed Rashed Farazuddin	AIMIM	9330	Cherka Mahesh	TRS	8672	658
95	Jubilee Hills	Kaja Suryanarayana	TRS	9131	Chandra Madhu	BJP	5092	4039
96	Yousufguda	Gurram Sanjay Goud	TRS	8623	Pasham Sainath Yadav	TDP	8369	254
97	Somajiguda	Attaluri Vijayalakshmi	TRS	9853	B. Charita	TDP	6338	3515
98	Ameerpet	N. Seshu Kumari	TRS	7370	Dr. Kathyayani Burugula	BJP	4815	2555
99	Vengal Rao Nagar	Kilari Manohar	TRS	7194	Vemullapalli Pradeep	TDP	6012	1182
100	Sanathnagar	Kolanu Lakshmi	TRS	12331	Kanuri Jaya Sree	TDP	8274	4057
101	Erragadda	Shaheen Begum	AIMIM	8588	K. Annapurna	TRS	7637	951
102	Rahmath Nagar	Mohammed Abdul Shafi	TRS	11301	Naveen Yadav	AIMIM	8971	2330
103	Borabanda	Baba Fasiuddin Mohammed	TRS	9937	Narshing Rao V	AIMIM	5426	4511
104	Kondapur	Shaik Hameed	TRS	16246	Neelam Ravinder Mudiraj	TDP	8912	7334
105	Gachibowli	Saibaba K	TRS	10707	Rama Rao C	BJP	4847	5860
106	Serilingampally	R. Nagendar Yadav	TRS	14914	M. Ravi	TDP	6271	8643
107	Madhapur	Jagadeeshwar	TRS	11782	Srinivas Yadav E	TDP	5777	6005
108	Miyapur	Meka Ramesh	TRS	9076	B. Mohan Raj	TDP	8046	1030
109	Hafeezpet	V. Pujitha Jagadeeshwar	TRS	17094	Shainaz Begum	TDP	8475	8619
110	Chanda Nagar	Bobba Navatha Reddy	TRS	11411	V. Vasundhara Devi	TDP	8580	2831
111	Bharathi Nagar	V. Sindhu	TRS	8926	Chinnamile Godavari	BJP	8758	168
112	Ramachandrapuram	Tonta Anjaiah	TRS	10833	Karike Satyanarayana	TDP	5242	5591
113	Patancheru	Mettu Shanker Yadav	INC	9316	Rajaboina Kumar Yadav	TRS	7930	1386
114	KPHB Colony	Mandadi Srinivasa Rao	TDP	13953	Adusumalli Venkateswarlu	TRS	11218	2735
115	Balaji Nagar	Kavya Reddy Pannala	TRS	16781	Gone Roopa Rao	TDP	11427	5354
116	Allapur	Sabeeha Begum	TRS	13149	Qursheed Begum	AIMIM	8377	4772
117	Moosapet	Thumu Shravan Kumar	TRS	11927	Babu Rao Pagudala	TDP	7877	4050
118	Fathe Nagar	Satish Babu Pandala	TRS	12898	K. Mahendar	BJP	7486	5412
119	Old Bowenpally	M. Narsimha Yadav	TRS	13375	Mohammed Omara	AIMIM	5283	8092
120	Bala Nagar	Kandoori Narendar	TRS	13238	Chillukuri Hari Chand	TDP	4418	8820
121	Kukatpally	Jupally Satyanarayana Rao	TRS	15808	Arshanapally Surya Rao	BJP	6810	8998
122	V V Nagar Colony	M. Laxmi Bal	TRS	12207	Madhavaram Roja Devi	BJP	10715	1492
123	Hyder Nagar	Rudraraju Venkata Raju	TRS	9424	Ranga Raya Vakalapudi	TDP	8986	438
124	Allwyn Colony	D. Venkatesh Goud	TRS	12542	Manchikalapudi Bhanu Prasad	TDP	8261	4281
125	Gajula Ramaram	Ravula Seshagari	TRS	14586	Mirza Rasheed Baig	TDP	5106	9480
126	Jagadgirigutta	Kolukula Jagan	TRS	11605	V. Krishna Goud	TDP	6006	5599
127	Rangareddy Nagar	B. Vijay Shekhar	TRS	14046	M. Srinivas	TDP	5445	8601
128	Chintal	Rashida Begum	TRS	10319	Radhika Kay	TDP	5556	4763
129	Suraram	Manthri Satyanarayana	TRS	10973	Manne Raju	TDP	6313	4660
130	Subhash Nagar	Devagari Shanthisri	TRS	17060	Gudimetla Aadilakshmi	IND	8165	8895
131	Quthbullapur	Kuna Gourish Parijatha	TRS	13323	Boddu Kameshwari	TDP	11594	1729
132	Jeedimetla	K. Padma	TRS	10261	Gaddam Swathika Reddy	TDP	6647	3614
133	Macha Bollaram	Es Raj Jitendar Nath	TRS	13388	Mugyari Surya Kiran	INC	4034	9354
134	Alwal	Chinthala Vijayshanti	TRS	11537	Thota Sujatha Reddy	IND	3804	7733
135	Venkatapuram	Sabitha Kishore	TRS	10616	M. C. Jagadish	BJP	3072	7544
136	Neredmet	Katikaneni Sreedevi	TRS	11810	V. Prasanna	BJP	4675	7135
137	Vinayak Nagar	Baddam Pushpalatha	TRS	14477	Pittala Renuka	TDP	5822	8655
138	Moula Ali	Mumtaz Fatima	TRS	9754	Gunnala Sunitha	BJP	7792	1962
139	East Anandbagh	Akula Narsing Rao	TRS	11604	K. Babu Singh	BJP	4897	6707
140	Malkajgiri	N. Jagadeeshwar Goud	TRS	11512	Mandal Vijay Kumar Yadav	TDP	7145	4367
141	Gotham Nagar	R. Shirisha	TRS	13487	M. Shyamala	BJP	6680	6807
142	Addagutta	Vijaya Kumari S	TRS	16635	T. Swarnalatha	CPM	1921	14714
143	Tarnaka	A. Saraswathi	TRS	18051	Banda Karthika Reddy	INC	5110	12941
144	Mettuguda	P. N. Bhargavi	TRS	10673	Katari Gayathri	TDP	2641	8032
145	Sitaphalmandi	Samala Hena	TRS	19533	Keerthi Mekala	TDP	4353	15180
146	Boudha Nagar	Byragoni Dhananjana Bai	TRS	13775	P. Swaroopa Ravi	BJP	3841	9934
147	Bansilalpet	Kurma Hemalatha	TRS	16669	Sravani Mallari	TDP	5380	11289
148	Ramgopalpet	A. Aruna	TRS	11721	Priyanka Varma	BJP	5218	6503
149	Begumpet	Uppala Tharuni	TRS	12296	Kuna Sathyakala	TDP	6545	5751
150	Monda Market	Akula Rupha	TRS	13354	Anitha Yadav Chirraboina	TDP	7092	6262
