= Krishna Swamy Mudiraj =

Indian author

Korvi Krishna Swamy Mudiraj

Mayor of Hyderabad, India
- In office 1957-1958

Personal details
- Born: 25 August 1894 Aurangabad, Hyderabad State
- Died: 19 December 1967 (aged 74) Hyderabad, Telangana, India

Korvi Krishna Swamy Mudiraj (25 August 1894 – 19 December 1967) was an activist, former Hyderabad mayor, writer, journalist and educator.

He was the Hyderabad City Mayor for the year 1957–1958.

== Early life and education ==
He was born on 25 August 1894 in Aurangabad and completed his education from the Nizam's college, Hyderabad. He obtained his higher education in Publishing Technology from Bombay.

== Career ==
He was elected four times and served as the municipal councillor for 25 years from the Chudi Bazar area.

A man known for his versatility, Mr. Korvi Krishna Swamy Mudiraj was a writer, journalist, educationist and leader. Many know him as the writer of ‘Pictorial Hyderabad’, a masterpiece on Hyderabad under the Asafjahi rulers. By sheer hard work he rose in life completing his matriculation from Chaderghat High School and Intermediate from the Nizam College. Later he pursued a course in printing and publishing technology at Bombay.

For a brief period he served as the private secretary of the then Prime Minister, Maharaj Krishan Prasad, and took up job at the AG Office.

Later he worked as editor of ‘Deccan Star’, English weekly and ‘Masaavat’, an Urdu weekly. He also edited the “New Era” and wrote columns in several Urdu dailies such as Siasat, Rayat, Rahnuma-e-Deccan, Emroz. In 1925 Mr. Mudiraj set up his own printing press and brought out the Pictorial Hyderabad four years later. He also authored several books, including the History of Hyderabad City Formation and Freedom Movement of Goa.

It was during his Mayorship that a master plan for Hyderabad was finalised. As a Mayor of Hyderabad he received the then Prime Minister, Pandit Jawaharlal Nehru and hosted a civic reception to Marshal Tito, the Yugoslavian president. Mr.Korvi Krishna Swamy Mudiraj was responsible for doing away with the manual rickshaw pulling system and encouraged cycle rickshaws. Mr Korvi Krishna Mudiraj exchanged views with Dr Baba Saheb Ambedkar on social welfare regularly due to his proximity with the later.

For his own mudiraj community, Mr.Korvi Krishna Swamy Mudiraj founded Nizam Rajya Mudiraj Mahaabha in 1922 and was president for mahasabha for the next 40 years and did a lot in the field of education for the mudiraj community and other weaker sections of the city. He also set up a number of libraries and formed the Hindi Kanya Pathshala to promote female literacy.

   [2][3][4]

== Legacy ==
A statue of Muddiraj was installed in Hyderabad near the Jubilee Bus Station.

== See also ==
- Mayor of Hyderabad (India)
- Greater Hyderabad Municipal Corporation
- Laxminarayana Mudiraj
- Hyderabad
