= K. Keshava Rao =

Indian politician (born 1939)

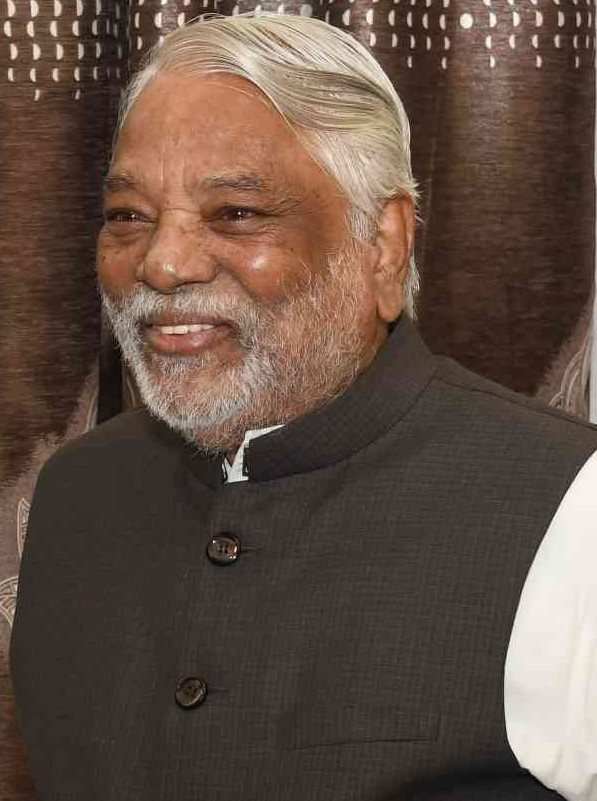

Member of Parliament, Rajya Sabha
- In office 10 April 2020 – 5 July 2024
- Preceded by: Himself
- Succeeded by: Abhishek Singhvi
- Constituency: Telangana
- In office 10 April 2014 – 9 April 2020
- Preceded by: Nandi Yellaiah
- Succeeded by: Himself
- Constituency: Andhra Pradesh; Telangana
- In office 3 April 2006 – 2 April 2012
- Preceded by: Alladi P Rajkumar
- Succeeded by: Renuka Chowdhury
- Constituency: Andhra Pradesh

32th President of the Andhra Pradesh Congress Committee
- In office 2005–2008
- AICC President: Sonia Gandhi
- Preceded by: Dharmapuri Srinivas
- Succeeded by: Dharmapuri Srinivas

Deputy Chairman Andhra Pradesh Legislative Council
- In office 1979–1980
- Chairman: Syed Mukasheer Shah
- Leader of the House: Marri Chenna Reddy
- Constituency: Andhra Pradesh

Member of Legislative Council Andhra Pradesh
- In office 1979–1985
- Chairman: Syed Mukasheer Shah
- Leader of the House: Marri Chenna Reddy
- Constituency: Andhra Pradesh

Personal details
- Born: Kancherla Keshava Rao; 4 April 1939 (age 87) Mahbubabad, Hyderabad State, British India (present–day Telangana, India)
- Party: Indian National Congress (till May 2013; 2024–present)
- Other political affiliations: Bharat Rashtra Samithi (May 2013–2024)
- Spouse: Vasanta Kumari
- Children: 4; including Gadwal Vijayalakshmi
- Education: Osmania University; Badruka College
- Occupation: Political and Social Worker, Journalist and Educationist

Kancherla Keshava Rao, popularly known as KK (born 4 June 1939), is an Indian politician from the Indian National Congress party. He previously served as a member of the Rajya Sabha, the upper house of the Indian Parliament from 2014 to 2024 and previously from 2006 to 2012.

Rao served as the Andhra Pradesh Congress Committee (APCC) president in the mid-2000s, during the tenure of late Chief Minister YS Rajasekhara Reddy in Andhra Pradesh. He joined the Bharat Rashtra Samithi (BRS), then Telangana Rashtra Samithi (TRS) in 2013 and served as the party secretary general. He was re-elected to Rajya Sabha in 2014 representing Andhra Pradesh. Despite being from Telangana he was assigned to Andhra Pradesh because of the lot method used to assign Rajya Sabha members for the newly created Telangana and residual Andhra Pradesh. In 2020, he was again re-elected for a six-year term representing Telangana.

K. Keshava Rao rejoined Congress party on 3 July 2024 in the presence of All India Congress Committee (AICC) president Mallikarjun Kharge in New Delhi. He resigned from the Rajya Sabha on 4 July 2024.

Keshava Rao was appointed as the Advisor (Public Affairs) to the Government of Telangana with Cabinet status by Chief Secretary A. Santhi Kumari on 6 July.

== Election History ==
=== Rajya Sabha ===
Position	Party	Constituency	From	To	Tenure
Member of Parliament, Rajya Sabha (1st Term)	INC	Andhra Pradesh	3 April 2006	2 April 2012	5 years, 365 days
Member of Parliament, Rajya Sabha (2nd Term)	TRS	Andhra Pradesh	10 April 2014	25 March 2020	5 years, 350 days
Member of Parliament, Rajya Sabha (3rd Term)	BRS	Telangana	10 April 2020	5 July 2024	4 years, 86 days

== Personal life ==
He was born to K. Niranjan Rao and Govindamma in Mahbubabad, Warangal, Hyderabad State on 13 December 1940 (official records 6 June 1939). He received his B.Com. from Badruka College, then pursued an M.A. at Osmania University's Arts College and later PhD from Osmania University, Hyderabad. He is married to Vasantha Kumari and has two sons and two daughters. One of his daughters, Gadwal Vijayalakshmi, served as the mayor of Greater Hyderabad Municipal Corporation.
