= Kaleru Venkatesh =

Indian politician

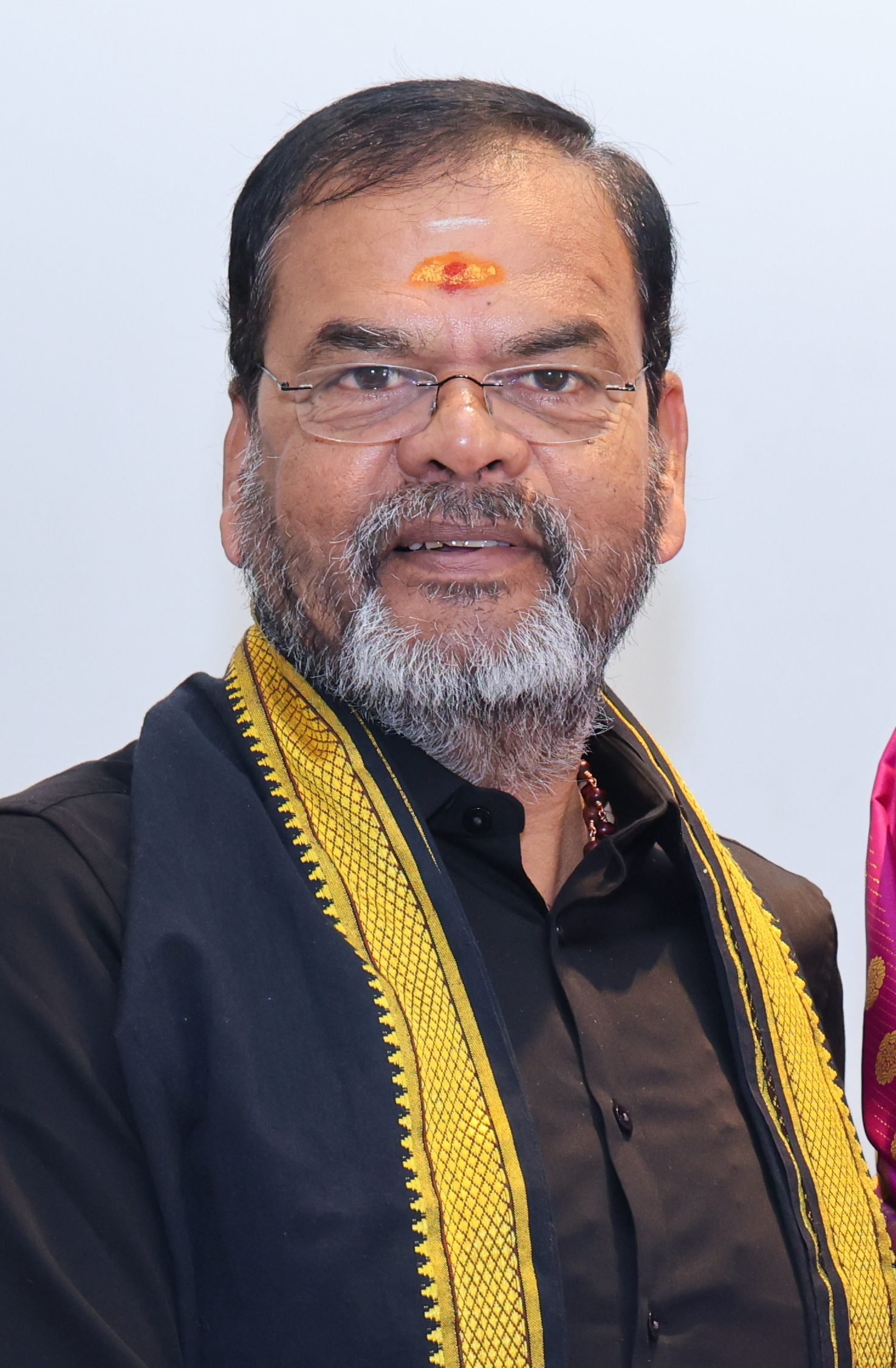
MLA Kaleru Venkatesh in 2026

Kaleru Venkatesh MLA (born 10 December 1960) is an Indian politician from Telangana state. He is a member of the Telangana Legislative Assembly from Amberpet Assembly constituency in Hyderabad district. He represents Bharat Rashtra Samithi and won the 2023 Telangana Legislative Assembly election.

== Early life and education ==
Venkatesh was born in Golnaka to late K. Anjaneyulu. He completed his LLB in 1986 from Faculty of Law, Delhi University. His wife, Kaleru Padma, was a former corporator of Golnaka. In 2005, he was the president of the Criminal Court Bar Association in Hyderabad.

== Career ==
Venkatesh started his political journey with Indian National Congress. He was the floor leader of Congress in the Greater Hyderabad Municipal Corporation from 2009 to 2012. From 2009 to 2014, he served as Golnaka corporator. Later, he joined Telangana Rashtra Samithi and became an MLA for the first time in 2018 from Amberpet Assembly constituency. He won the 2018 Telangana Legislative Assembly election defeating G. Kishan Reddy of Bharatiya Janata Party by a narrow margin of 1,016 votes. He polled 61,558 votes.

He won for the second time from Amberpet representing Bharat Rashtra Samithi in the 2023 Telangana Legislative Assembly election. He polled 74,416 votes and defeated his nearest rival, Chenaboyanna Krishna Yadav of Bharatiya Janata Party, by a margin of 24,537 votes.
