= Baba Fasiuddin =

Indian politician

Deputy Mayor of Hyderabad
- In office 2014 – 4 December 2020
- Mayor: Bonthu Rammohan
- Succeeded by: Mothe Srilatha Reddy

Personal details
- Born: 6 June 1984 (age 42) Kulcharam
- Party: Indian National Congress (8 February 2024 - Till)
- Other political affiliations: Telangana Rashtra Samithi (2004-2024)
- Spouse: Habiba Sultana
- Children: 2
- Parent: Baba Shareef Uddin (father)

Baba Fasiuddin is an Indian politician who was the First Deputy Mayor of Greater Hyderabad Municipal Corporation after formation of Telangana (GHMC) from 2014 to 4 December 2020. As only the only nominee, he was elected unanimously. He won as Borabanda's representative. Baba Fasiuddin has become the first deputy mayor of Hyderabad after the formation of Telangana.

A graduate in commerce, Mr. Fasiuddin played a key role in the Telangana movement as well as in the student and youth wings of the Telangana Rashtra Samithi. He is an associate of Chief Minister K. Chandrashekar Rao.

His family is from Kolcharam Mandal in Medak District. He is presently the president of the TRS Student wing of Greater Hyderabad unit. Fasiuddin's father is a retired Government employee. His mother was an employee at Osmania Hospital. Mr. Fasiuddin is married and has 1 son and a daughter.

Baba Fasiuddin on 8 February 2024 joined Congress Party in the presence of Telangana Congress in-charge Deepa Dasmunsi.
