= 1986 Hyderabad Municipal Corporation election =

- March 1986

All 100 elected seats in the Municipal Corporation of Hyderabad 51 seats needed for a majority
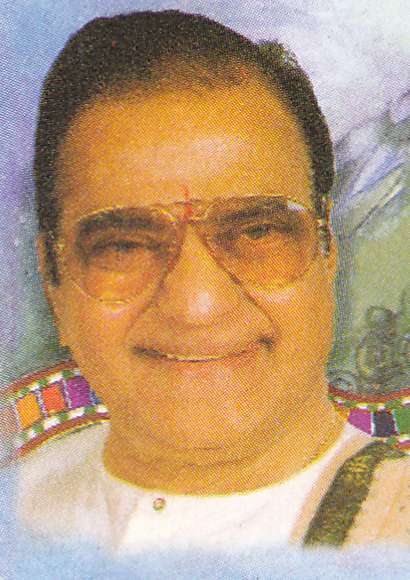

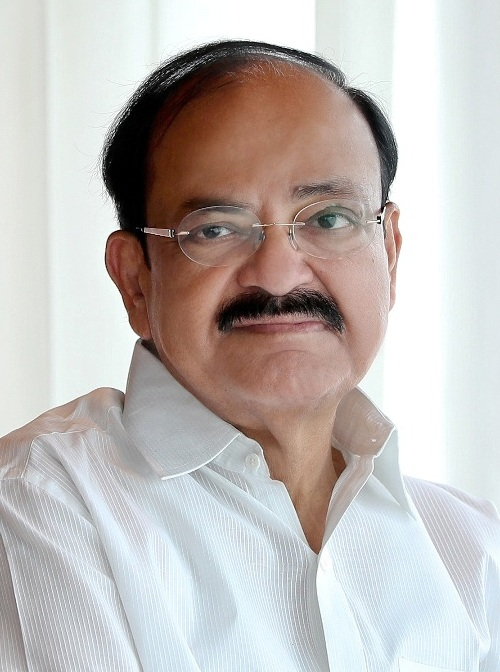
	First party	Second party
Leader	Sultan Salahuddin Owaisi	N. T. Rama Rao
Party	AIMIM	TDP
Seats won	38	24
	Third party	Fourth party
Leader	Jalagam Vengala Rao	Venkaiah Naidu
Party	INC(I)	BJP
Seats won	24	12
Mayor before election
N/C
Elected Mayor
Kalra Prakash Rao
AIMIM

The 1986 Hyderabad Municipal Corporation election was conducted in March 1986 to elect members to all 99 wards of the municipal corporation. The All India Majlis-e-Ittehadul Muslimeen emerged as the single largest party and formed the government with outside support from the Indian National Congress.

== Background ==
The election day was marked by a tense atmosphere as the Telugu Desam Party attempted to capture the polls by impersonation. TDP legislator P. Siva Reddy was caught with bombs in the Charmahal area, while another party MLA Nooka Raju was caught by police with a group of men carrying bombs and guns.

Ashok Yadav, TDP candidate for Himayatnagar division, tried to run away with a ballot box and whipped out a knife but was overpowered by a constable. Another TDP candidate, Rathod, was caught by the police with a store of country made bombs in his house.

The AIMIM fought the election with the slogan "sheher hamara, mayor hamara" (our city, our mayor). Following the victory of the AIMIM, party chief Sultan Salahuddin Owaisi proclaimed that AIMIM was committed to the all-round development of the city and neglect of the old city would now end.

AIMIM alleged gerrymandering by the state government to reduce the political power of Muslims. For example, Riyasathnagar division with an overwhelming Muslim population had 33,195 voters whereas Hindu-majority Chilkalguda division had just 6,457 voters.

== Result ==
Parties and Coalitions	Seats
Parties and Coalitions	Won
All India Majlis-e-Ittehadul Muslimeen (AIMIM)	38
Indian National Congress (Indira) (INC-I)	24
Telugu Desam Party (TDP)	24
Bharatiya Janata Party (BJP)	12
Communist Party of India (Marxist) (CPI-M)	1
Independents	1
Total	100

== Government formation ==
The AIMIM formed the government with outside support from the Indian National Congress.
