= Nerella =

Nerella (Telugu: నేరెళ్ళ) is a Telugu surname. Notable people with the surname include:

- Nerella Anjaneyulu (born 1953), Indian politician
- Nerella Sharada, Indian politician and activist
- Nerella Venu Madhav (1932–2018), Indian musician, impressionist, and ventriloquist
