= Palm Valley =

Palm Valley may mean:

- Palm Valley, Florida, United States
- Palm Valley, Cameron County, Texas, United States
- Palm Valley, Williamson County, Texas United States
- Palm Valley (Northern Territory), Australia
- Palm Valley, Baja California, Mexico
- Palm Valley, Hyderabad, India
