= Shivam Road =

- neighbourhood
- Location in Telangana, India Shivam Road (Telangana) Shivam Road (India)
- Coordinates: 17.390941°N 78.523493°E
- Country: India
- State: Telangana
- District: Hyderabad
- Metro: Hyderabad

Government
  - Body: GHMC

Languages
  - Official: Telugu
- Time zone: UTC+5:30 (IST)
- PIN: 500 013
- Vehicle registration: TG
- Lok Sabha constituency: Secunderabad Lok Sabha constituency
- Vidhan Sabha constituency: Amberpet Assembly constituency
- Planning agency: GHMC
- Website: telangana.gov.in

Shivam Road is a major commercial and residential area in Amberpet, Hyderabad, Telangana, India. This area is named after the Shivam Temple which houses a large shiva lingam, with the foundation stone laid by Satya Sai Baba.

== Commercial Area ==
This area teems with shopping complexes, restaurants, grocery stores, etc. It also houses a part and entrance of the eminent Osmania University (OU Gate).

It also has many prominent temples in and around the area such as Ahobila Mutt and Ayyappa Swamy Temple. The Ayyappa Swamy Temple is well known for Ayyappa Puja in December and January while Ahobila Mutt is a noted temple of Narasimha. Other prominent temples in the area include Ramalayam, Shirdi Sai Baba Temple & Lingala Gadda Shiva Temple.

== Transport ==
Shivam Road is well connected by Telangana State Road Transport Corporation buses, having situated near the heart of the city.

The closest MMTS Train station is at Vidya nagar.

== Schools & Educational Institutions ==
There are many good schools and educational institutions in this area. Some of the higher learning institutes are

- ATI (Advanced Training Institute)
- Hyderabad institute of Physics (HIP)

Some of the famous schools are

- Sri Aurobindo International School (ICSE)
- The Mother's Integral School
- Sri Sathya Sai Vidhya Vihar High School
- Narayana E Techno School

Some of the famous Intermediate colleges are

- Sarath Junior College
- Chaitanya Junior College

Osmania University is adjacent to D.D. Colony and is the oldest in Hyderabad and one of the oldest in India. This area also has a noted law college, College Of Law For Women.

== Hospitals ==
This area also has many noted hospitals

- Shantilal Navodaya Multi-speciality Hospital
- Seasons Multi-speciality Hospital
- Tilak Nagar Hospital
- Durgabai Deshmukh Hospital and Research Centre
- Sir Ronald Ross Institute of Tropical and Communicable Diseases (also known as Fever Hospital)
