= Bahadur Yar Jung =

Indian politician (1905–1944)

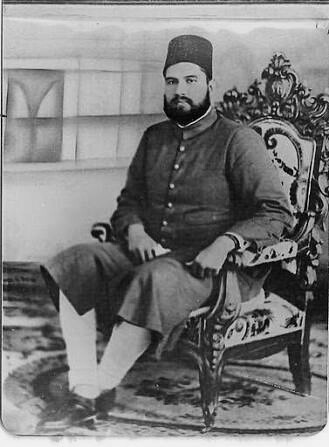
- Born: Muhammad Bahadur Khan; 3 February 1905; Hyderabad, Hyderabad State, British India
- Died: 25 June 1944 (aged 39); Hyderabad, Hyderabad State, British India
- Resting place: Hyderabad, India
- Education: Madarsay Darul-Uloom
- Political party: Majlis-e-Ittehadul Muslimeen; All India Muslim League; Khaksar Tehrik
- Spouse: Noor Alam Khatoon

Bahadur Yar Jung (3 February 1905 – 25 June 1944) was an Indian politician and the foremost Muslim leader in the princely state of Hyderabad in British India.

He founded All India Majlis-e-Ittehadul Muslimeen and the branches of Khaksars in Hyderabad and was known as a powerful religious preacher. In 1938, he was elected the President of Majlis-e-Ittehadul Muslimeen, a position in which he served till his death.

== Career ==
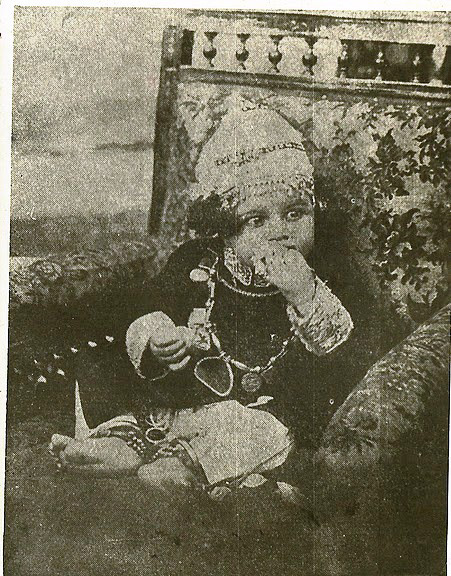
Jung aged 1

Bahadur Yar Jung wanted his own princely home state, Hyderabad, to be separate from the rest of India as an Islamic/Muslim state with Sharia Law. He was the founder and led an organisation called Majlis-e-Ittehadul Muslimeen, for the propagation of Islam. A friend and aide to Allama Mohammed Iqbal and Muhammad Ali Jinnah, he was one of the most admired leaders of the Pakistan Movement. In 1926, Bahadur Yar Jung was elected president of the Society of Mahdavis. In 1927, he led an organisation called Majlis-e-Ittehadul Muslimeen, of which he was the founder member. In 1930, he was elected secretary of the Union of Jagirdars which had been established in 1892 but was moribund. A great Muslim zealot, he advocated peaceful but separate and independent co-existence among people of different religions after the independence of British India. So he vigorously supported All India Muslim League and the Pakistan Movement. He was closely associated with both Allama Iqbal and Muhammad Ali Jinnah. He was an author and a practising Muslim.

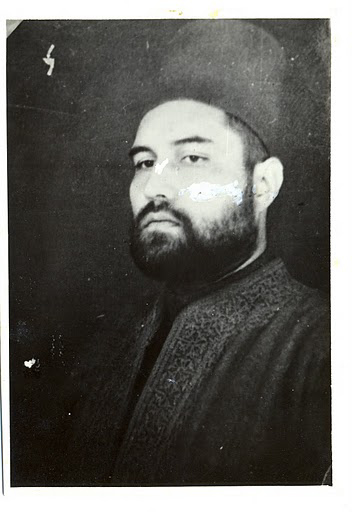
An undated portrait of Bahadur Yar Jung

=== Oratory ===
Matched by very few, his oratory skills served as a catalyst to the independence struggle of British India. On 26 December 1943, he delivered an important speech in the All India Muslim League Conference. In the first half of his speech he laid stress on the struggle for Pakistan. In the second half he talked about the creation of Pakistan. At the end he said:

"Muslims! Decisions made under pressure do not last for long. To-day we are not in need of a tree that blooms like a flower or in need of fruit that tastes sweet to our mouths. Instead, we are in the need of fine manure that dissolves in the soil and strengthens the roots. That will unite with the water and soil to produce beautiful flowers. That will destroy itself but will leave its scent and taste in the flowers. We are at present not in need of beautiful scenery that looks good to the eyes, but what we need are foundation stones that will bury themselves in the soil to make the building standing on them strong."

== Syed Abul A'la Maududi and the Nawab ==
Syed Abul A'la al-Maududi's first encounter with Bahadur Yar Jang was at the Hyderabad Educational Conference in 1929. Maududi said about him:

"When I listened to his speech on this occasion, I was not even aware of his name. Before too long in the course of his speech, I realized that I am facing a man different from the ordinary speakers. His organized thoughts, coherent statements, choice of appropriate words and their well-timed use peppered with good literary taste combined to impress me immediately. Upon asking around in the audience I was told that this was Navab Bahadur Khan, a jagirdar (landholder). On hearing his class background, I was even more impressed. Knowing the feudal class of Hyderabad, I did not expect such a great speaker with pure thoughts and wide knowledge to emerge from that class."

Despite this, Maududi disassociated himself from the Nawab's Majlis-e-Ittehad as he found "no benefit in their method of work" and was also critical of him saying that:

"There definitely are some good qualities in Bahadur Yar Jang, but his mind is not clear yet. He [sometimes] raises the voice of the Caliphate of God, [sometimes] he is with the Khaksars and the Muslim League. Sometimes he is involved in Haydarabadi non-Haydarabadi disputes."

Bahadur Yar Jang wrote a letter in 1938, expressing his appreciation for Maududi's activities and regretted that Maududi did not bid him farewell before the latter's departure to Punjab.

== Personal life ==
He was the son of Nawab Naseeb Yar Jung, a prominent resident of Hyderabad. His wife's name was Talmain Khatoon. He had two brothers: Nawab Mohammed Mandoor Khan Sadozai and Nawab Mohammed Doulath Khan Sadozai. Nawab Mohammed Mandoor Khan’s three sons (Nawab Mohammed Naseeb Khan, Nawab Mohammed Bahadur Khan and Nawab Mohammed Adil Khan). His grandson Nawab Mohammad Moazam Khan s/o Nawab Mohammed Naseeb Khan is an Bahadurpura constituency MLA since 2004-2023 from AIMIM party which was founded by Nawab Bahadur Yar Jung.

== Commemorations ==
- Bahadurabad, a neighbourhood of Karachi, Sindh, Pakistan, is named after Bahadur Yar Jung.
- City of Karachi, Pakistan also has Bahadur Yar Jung Library and Bahadur Yar Jung Academy named after him.
- In 1990, Pakistan Post issued a postage stamp depicting him in its Pioneers of Freedom series designed by Saeed Akhtar.

== See also ==
- Bahadurabad

== Bibliography ==
- Benichou, Lucien D. (2000), From Autocracy to Integration: Political Developments in Hyderabad State, 1938–1948, Orient Blackswan, ISBN 978-81-250-1847-6
