= Mohammed Mubeen =

Indian politician

Member of Telangana Legislative Assembly
- Incumbent
- Assumed office 3 December 2023
- Preceded by: Moazam Khan
- Constituency: Bahadurpura

12th Mayor of Hyderabad
- In office 1995–1999
- Preceded by: Mir Zulfeqar Ali
- Succeeded by: Mir Zulfeqar Ali

Personal details
- Party: All India Majlis-e-Ittehadul Muslimeen
- Parent: Mohammed Fareeduddin (father)

Mohammed Mubeen (born 2 February 1968) is an Indian politician from Telangana state. He is an MLA from Bahadurpura Assembly constituency in Hyderabad district. He represents All India Majlis-e-Ittehadul Muslimeen party and won the 2023 Telangana Legislative Assembly election.

== Early life and education ==
Mubeen is from Bahadurpura, Hyderabad. He is born to Mohammed Fareed Uddin. He completed his schooling in 1986 at Zilla Parishad High School, Mominpet, Ranga Reddy district. He dropped out after passing Class 12.

== Career ==
Mubeen is an AIMIM party worker from 1989. He started his political life winning as a corporator and became a four time corporator. He first won from Aghapura in 2002. He was then elected from Ramnaspura in 2009 and 2015. In 2020, he became Shastripuram corporator. Then he got an unexpected call from the party president, and the party nominated him for Bahadurpura seat in place of sitting MLA Mohammad Moazam Khan. He became an MLA for the first time winning the Bhadurpura Assembly constituency representing AIMIM in the 2023 Telangana Legislative Assembly election. He polled 89,451 votes and defeated his nearest rival, Mir Inayath Ali Baqri of Bharat Rashtra Samithi by a huge margin of 67,025 votes.
