= Bahadurpura Assembly constituency =

Constituency of the Telangana legislative assembly in India

Coordinates: 17.357°N 78.462°E

Bahadurpura
- Constituency No. 69 for the Telangana Legislative Assembly
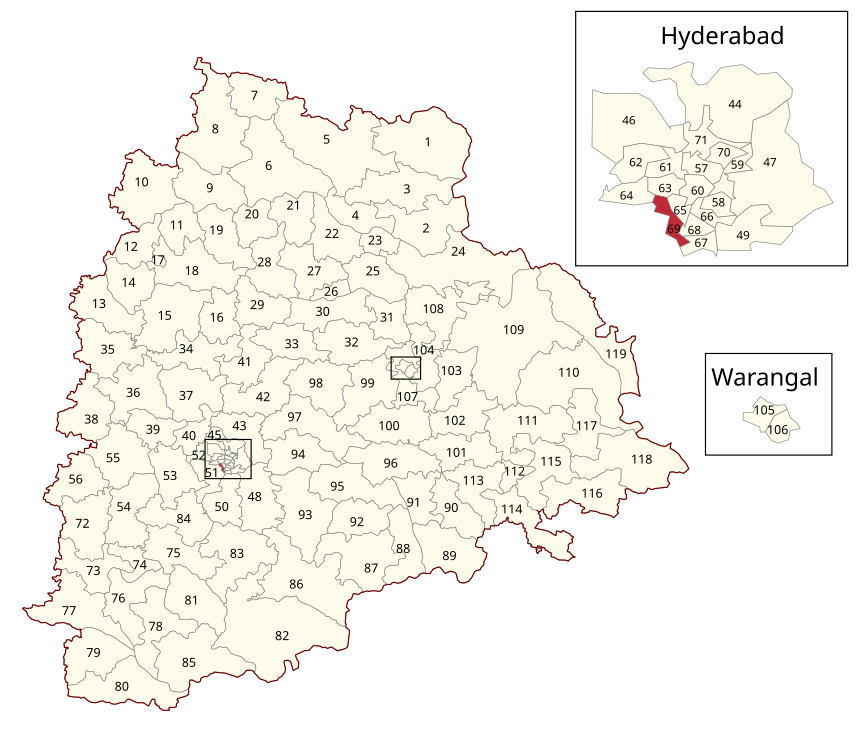
- Location of Bahadurpura Assembly constituency within Telangana

Constituency details
- Country: India
- Region: South India
- State: Telangana
- District: Hyderabad
- Lok Sabha constituency: Hyderabad
- Established: 2008
- Total electors: 2,44,055
- Reservation: None

Member of Legislative Assembly
- 3rd Telangana Legislative Assembly
- Incumbent Mohammad Mubeen
- Party: AIMIM
- Elected year: 2023

Bahadurpura Assembly constituency is a constituency of Telangana Legislative Assembly, India. It is one of fifteen constituencies in the capital city of Hyderabad. It is part of Hyderabad Lok Sabha constituency. Bahadur Pura was derived from the name of Nawab Mohammad Bahadur Khan, who was also known as Qaid E Millat Nawab Bahadur Yar Jung, who was the Jagirdar in Nizam rule Deccan State, then also a great orator and belonging to a well-known family of Hyderabad was the Founder and First President of Majlis E Ittehadul Muslimeen (MIM) which is now All India Majlis-e-Ittehadul Muslimeen.

Mohammad Moazam Khan of All India Majlis-e-Ittehadul Muslimeen won the seat for three consecutive time with record majority of 95,000+ votes from 2009 to 2023 as an MLA. Mohammad Moazam Khan who is also a grandson of Late Nawab Bahadur Yar Jung founder and first President of Majlis-E-Ittehadul Muslimeen (MIM). This is why Bahadurpura Assembly constituency is also known as bastion of AIMIM. Mohammed Mubeen won the 2023 Assembly election.

== Extent of the constituency ==
The constituency was created before the 2009 elections as per Delimitation Act of 2002. The Assembly Constituency presently comprises the following neighbourhoods:

Neighbourhood
Aliabad
Jahanuma
Tadbun
Falaknuma
Bahadurpura
Doodh Bowli
Hashamabad

== Members of the Legislative Assembly ==
Election	Member	Party
2014	Mohammad Moazam Khan	All India Majlis-e-Ittehadul Muslimeen
2018	Mohammad Moazam Khan	All India Majlis-e-Ittehadul Muslimeen
2023	Mohammed Mubeen	All India Majlis-e-Ittehadul Muslimeen

== Election results ==
=== Assembly Election 2023 ===
2023 Telangana Legislative Assembly election : Bahadurpura
Party	Candidate	Votes	%	±%
AIMIM	Mohammed Mubeen	89,451	62.24	▼12.72
BRS	Mir Inayath Ali Baqri	22,426	15.60	New
INC	Pulipati Rajesh Kumar	14,448	10.05	▲4.51
BJP	Y. Naresh	11,621	8.09	▲2.37
MBT	Sikender Ullah Khan	2,862	1.99	New
NOTA	None of the above	1,279	0.89	▼0.05
Margin of victory		67,025	46.63	▼17.14
Turnout		144,404	45.60	▼4.79
Total valid votes		143,725		
Registered electors		316,675		▲22.17
AIMIM hold		Swing	▼12.72	

=== Assembly Election 2018 ===
2018 Telangana Legislative Assembly election : Bahadurpura
Party	Candidate	Votes	%	±%
AIMIM	Mohammad Moazam Khan	96,993	74.96	▼4.23
BRS	Mir Inayath Ali Baqri	14,475	11.19	▲8.43
BJP	Haneef Ali	7,395	5.72	New
INC	Shaik Mohammed Kaleemuddin	7,174	5.54	▲1.94
NYP	Mohammed Sultanuddin	1,976	1.53	New
NOTA	None of the above	1,210	0.94	▲0.02
Margin of victory		82,518	63.77	▼6.65
Turnout		130,608	50.39	▼5.46
Total valid votes		129,394		
Registered electors		259,214		▲6.28
AIMIM hold		Swing	▼4.23	

=== Assembly Election 2014 ===
2014 Telangana Legislative Assembly election : Bahadurpura
Party	Candidate	Votes	%	±%
AIMIM	Mohammad Moazam Khan	106,874	79.19	
TDP	Mohammed Abdul Rahman	11,829	8.76	
INC	Syed Abdul Sami	4,857	3.60	
BRS	Mohammed Ziauddin	3,719	2.76	
MBT	Rashed Hashmi	2,538	1.88	
YSRCP	M. Rameshwari Shyamala	1,967	1.46	
AAP	Shaik Naseem Begum	1,647	1.22	
NOTA	None of the above	1,242	0.92	
Margin of victory		95,045	70.42	
Turnout		136,218	55.85	
Total valid votes		134,967		
Registered electors		243,892		
AIMIM win (new seat)				

== See also ==
- List of constituencies of Telangana Legislative Assembly
