= Mohammad Moazam Khan =

Indian politician

Nawab Mohammad Moazam Khan

Member of the Legislative Assembly (India)
- In office 11 May 2004 - 3 December 2023
- Preceded by: Danam Nagender (2004) by election
- Succeeded by: Mohammed Mubeen (2023)
- Constituency: Asafnagar(2004-2009); Bahadurpura (2009 - 2014)] (2014 - 2023)

Personal details
- Born: 10 September 1970 (age 56) Hyderabad
- Party: All India Majlis-e-Ittehadul Muslimeen
- Spouse: Zehra Khatoon
- Children: 4
- Parent(s): Bahadur Yar Jung (grandfather); Mohammad Naseeb Khan (father)
- Education: St. Peter's Engineering College (drop-out)
- Profession: Politician

Nawab Mohammad Moazam Khan (born 10 September 1970) is an Indian politician and a former Member of Telangana Legislative Assembly of the Bahadurpura from the All India Majlis-e-Ittehadul Muslimeen.

== Career ==
In September 2004, the All India Majlis-e-Ittehadul Muslimeen party nominated Khan as their candidate for the Asif Nagar by elections instead of renominating Haji Seth. Party president Sultan Salahuddin Owaisi justified the nomination by saying that Khan came from non-controversial and educated family. He won the elections by a margin of 2,110 votes as he was polled 25,719 votes compared to 24,609 votes in favour of Congress candidate Nagender. In 2009, he won the elections from the Bahadurpura. He was renominated by his party for the newly formed state Telangana assembly elections from Bahadurpura for 2nd time in 2014 where he had secured highest votes . He was re-elected from the constituency as he was polled 106,874 and hence defeating his nearest rival Telugu Desam Party's Mohammad Abdul Rahman by around 95,000 votes.

In 2018 Assembly Elections with his previous election performance he was renominated by the Party from the same Bahadurpura Constituency and won with the margin above 90,000 votes. With all this victorious performances he was called as back bone of AIMIM party as he secured highest votes time and time without any controversies and bad remark on him. He also served as member of Telangana Waqf board from 2014 to 2018. He is also a panel speaker in Telangana legislative assembly (2018-2023).
