= Mir Zulfeqar Ali =

Indian politician

Member of Telangana Legislative Assembly
- Incumbent
- Assumed office 3 December 2023
- Preceded by: Mumtaz Ahmed Khan
- Constituency: Charminar

11th Mayor of Hyderabad
- In office 1991–1995
- Preceded by: Allampalli Pochaiah
- Succeeded by: Mohammed Mubeen
- In office 1999–2000
- Preceded by: Mohammed Mubeen
- Succeeded by: Teegala Krishna Reddy

Personal details
- Party: All India Majlis-e-Ittehadul Muslimeen

Mir Zulfeqar Ali (born 1961) is an Indian politician who is serving as a Member of the Telangana Legislative Assembly from the Charminar Assembly constituency. He won on 3 December 2023, as a candidate of All India Majlis-e-Ittehadul Muslimeen. He had also served as Mayor of Hyderabad from 1991 to 1995 and 1999 to 2002.
