= List of mayors of Hyderabad =

Mayor of Hyderabad
- Incumbent; Vacant since 10 February 2026
- Status: Head of Greater Hyderabad Municipal Corporation
- Abbreviation: HYDMYR
- Member of: Greater Hyderabad Municipal Corporation
- Residence: Hyderabad, Telangana, India
- Seat: 5-1-304, Main Rd, Hashmath Gunj, Subhash Nagar, Badi Chowdi, Koti, Hyderabad, Telangana 500095
- Appointer: Elected by the councillors
- Term length: 5 years
- Inaugural holder: Madapati Hanumantha Rao
- Formation: 19 years, 162 days
- Website: GHMC Mayor

The mayor of Hyderabad is the head of the Greater Hyderabad Municipal Corporation which is abbreviated as GHMC. The tenure for the post of GHMC is for 5 years. Currently the GHMC consists of 150 wards. Each ward is headed by a ward member and these elected ward members elect a mayor for the corporation. The post of the mayor of Hyderabad is currently vacant.

== List of mayors ==
Sno.	Name	Portrait	Tenure			Party	Notes	Ref.
Sno.	Name	Portrait	Term start	Term end	Duration	Party	Notes	Ref.
Municipal Corporation of Hyderabad (MCH)								
1.	Madapati Hanumantha Rao		1951	1954	4 years	Andhra Maha Sabha	First mayor of MCH	
Incumbent due to Andhra Pradesh reorganization issue (1954-1957); Elections not held								
2.	Krishna Swamy Mudiraj		1957	1958	1 year	Mudiraj Maha Sabha	First backward caste mayor of MCH; First mayor after Andhra Pradesh reorganization.	
3.	Shahabuddin Ahmed		1958	1961				
4.	V. Ram Moorthy Naidu		1961	1962		Indian National Congress		
5.	Rani Kumudini Devi		1962	1963	1 year	Indian National Congress	First women mayor of MCH	
6.	MR Shyam Rao		1964	1965	1 year	Indian National Congress		
7.	Sarojini Pulla Reddy		1965	1966	1 year	Indian National Congress		
8.	Mir Akber Ali Nasiri		1966	1967	1 year	Indian National Congress	First minority mayor of MCH	
9.	K. Konda Reddy		1968	1968	less than one year	Indian National Congress	First Mayor who is in Least term of office	
10.	B. Kumud Nayak		1968	1969	1 year	Indian National Congress	First scheduled tribe caste women Mayor of MCH	
11.	Laxminarayana Mudiraj		1969	1970	1 year			
12.			1970	1975				
Vacant due to emergency (1975-1977); Elections not held (1978)
13.			1978	1982				
14.			1982	1986				
15.	Kalra Prakash Rao		1986	1987	1 year	All India Majlis-e-Ittehadul Muslimeen	First dalit mayor of MCH	
16.	Anumula Satyanarayana		1987	1989	2 years	All India Majlis-e-Ittehadul Muslimeen		
17.	Allampalli Pochaiah		1989	1991	2 years	All India Majlis-e-Ittehadul Muslimeen		
18.	Mir Zulfeqar Ali		1991	1995	4 years	All India Majlis-e-Ittehadul Muslimeen		
19.	Mohammed Mubeen		1995	1999	4 years	All India Majlis-e-Ittehadul Muslimeen		
17.	Mir Zulfeqar Ali		1999	2002	3 years	All India Majlis-e-Ittehadul Muslimeen	First second term mayor of MCH	
18.	Teegala Krishna Reddy		2002	2007	5 years	Telugu Desam Party	First Mayor who completed his term Last mayor of MCH.	

=== Greater Hyderabad Municipal Corporation (Since 2007) ===
#	Portrait	Mayor (Lifespan) Ward	Term of the office			Election	Party	Ref.
#	Portrait	Mayor (Lifespan) Ward	Term start	Term end	Duration	Election	Party	Ref.
Elections not held during the period (2007 – 2009)
1		Banda Karthika Reddy (born 1977); Corporator for Tarnaka	4 December 2009	4 December 2011	2 years, 0 days	2009	Indian National Congress	
2		Mohammad Majid Hussain (born 1980); Corporator for Ahmed Nagar	4 January 2012	7 May 2014	2 years, 123 days	2009	All India Majlis-e-Ittehadul Muslimeen	
Elections not held during the period (2014 – 2016)
3		Bonthu Rammohan (born 1973); Corporator for Cherlapally	11 February 2016	10 February 2021	4 years, 365 days	2016	Telangana Rashtra Samithi	
4		Gadwal Vijayalakshmi (born 1964); Corporator for Banjara Hills	11 February 2021	10 February 2026	4 years, 364 days	2020	Telangana Rashtra Samithi	
Elections not held during the period (2026 – present)
