= Gadwal Vijayalakshmi =

Indian politician

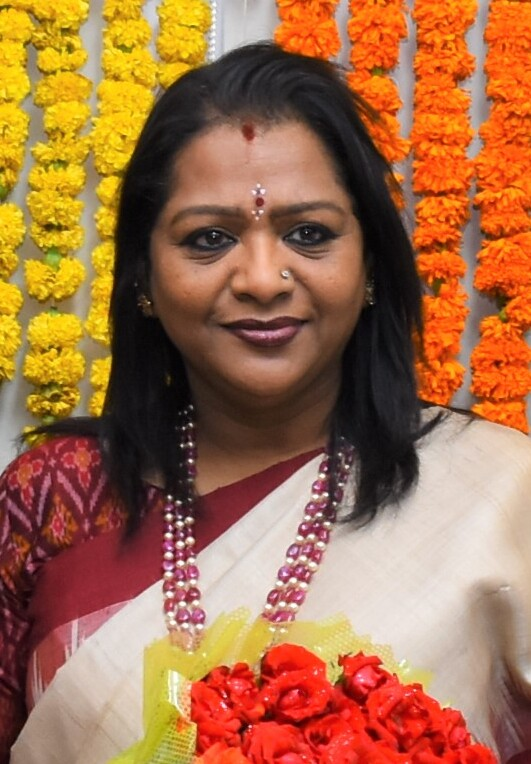
- Vijayalakshmi in 2022

Telangana State Women Commission Chairperson
- Incumbent
- Assumed office 21 May 2026
- Preceded by: Nerella Sharada

4th Mayor of Hyderabad
- In office 11 February 2021 – 10 February 2026
- Deputy: Mothe Srilatha Reddy
- Preceded by: Bonthu Rammohan
- Succeeded by: Administrator
- Constituency: Banjara Hills

Personal details
- Born: 21 June 1964 (age 62) Hyderabad, Andhra Pradesh, (present-day Telangana), India
- Citizenship: India (till 1999; 2009–present); United States (1999–2009)
- Party: Indian National Congress (since 2024)
- Other political affiliations: Bharat Rashtra Samithi (2016–2024)
- Spouse: Bobby Reddy
- Parent: K. Keshava Rao (father)
- Education: Bharatiya Vidya Bhavan; Sultan-ul-Uloom College of Law

Gadwal Vijayalakshmi is an Indian politician who was the mayor of Greater Hyderabad Municipal Corporation (GHMC) from 2021 to 2026. A former American citizen, she emigrated back to India to join politics and went on to become the fifth woman mayor of Hyderabad and the first post formation of the state of Telangana.

Gadwal Vijayalakshmi joined Congress in the presence of Chief Minister Revanth Reddy and AICC in-charge Deepa Dasmunsi on 30 March 2024.

== Early life ==
Gadwal Vijayalakshmi is born to a politician K. Keshava Rao and his wife Vasantha Kumar. Rao is a politician from Indian National Congress party and Member of Parliament who represented Andhra Pradesh in the Rajya Sabha, the upper house of the Indian Parliament.

Vijayalakshmi married Bobby Reddy whom she met at ICRISAT tennis club.

== Education ==
Vijayalakshmi completed her secondary school at Holy Mary School, Hyderabad and Junior College at Reddy Women's College, Hyderabad, Bachelor's in Journalism from Bharatiya Vidya Bhavan and Bachelor of Laws (LLB) from Sultan-ul-Uloom Law College, Hyderabad.

Following her undergraduate studies, she emigrated to the United States and obtained her green card in 1988, following which, she got married and settled there. She became an American citizen in 1999. While staying in North Carolina, United States, Vijayalakshmi worked in the cardiology department of the Duke University Hospital as a research scholar.

== Political career ==
In 2004, she emigrated back to India and eventually left her American citizenship in 2009 to join politics full-time. In 2016, she contested as a corporator from the Bharat Rashtra Samithi and won. In 2020, she contested from Banjara Hills ward as a corporator and won. On 11 February 2021, she was elected as the first woman Mayor after the formation of the Telangana state in 2014.

== Controversies ==
=== Stray dog attack incident ===
On February 19, 2023, a tragic incident occurred in Hyderabad when a 4-year-old boy was fatally attacked by three stray dogs on a deserted street, with graphic footage circulating on social media. The boy was rushed to the hospital but was pronounced dead upon arrival.

In response to the incident, as the mayor, Vijayalakshmi held a press conference on February 21, confirming that the dogs involved had previously been sterilized as part of the GHMC's animal birth control program. She suggested that the dogs might have become aggressive due to hunger, as a regular feeder in the area had been absent for two days. Vijayalakshmi emphasized the importance of dog adoption and announced plans to put up 600 dogs for adoption each month.

However, her comments faced backlash, particularly from the Congress party, which demanded her resignation and an ex-gratia payment of Rs. 50 lakh to the victim's family. Additionally, filmmaker Ram Gopal Varma criticized the mayor for her response and expressed frustration with the GHMC's handling of the situation. The controversy continued to escalate, with Varma's comments gaining attention on social media.

On March 7, Vijayalakshmi offered a Rs. 9.7 lakh ex-gratia payment to the grieving family of the young victim and reaffirmed efforts to address the issue of stray dogs through awareness programs and control measures.
