= Amberpet Assembly constituency =

Constituency of the Telangana legislative assembly in India

Coordinates: 17.40°N 78.52°E

Amberpet
- Constituency No. 59 for the Telangana Legislative Assembly
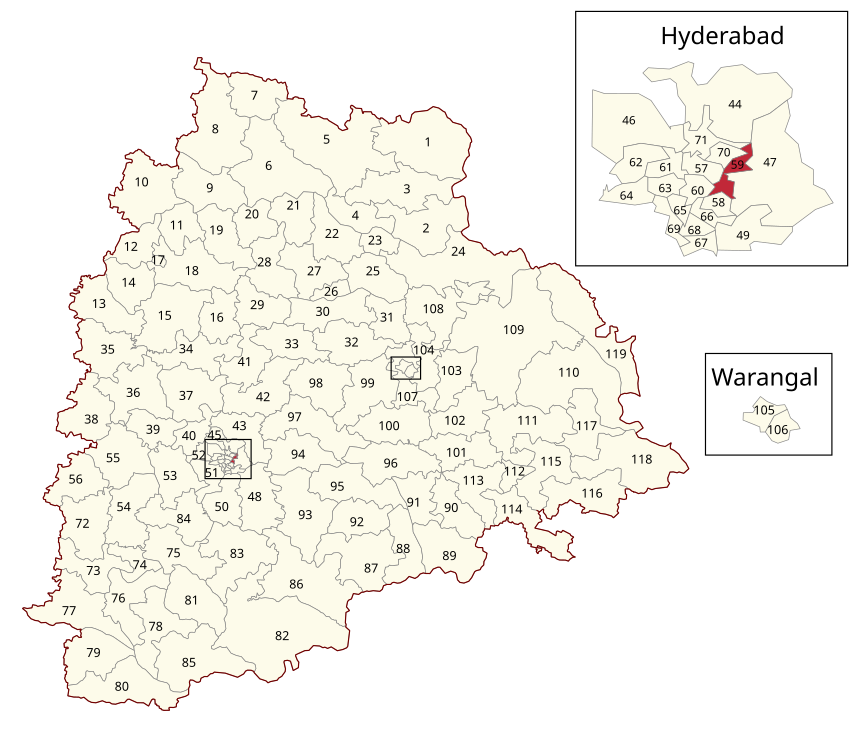
- Location of Amberpet Assembly constituency within Telangana

Constituency details
- Country: India
- Region: South India
- State: Telangana
- District: Hyderabad
- Lok Sabha constituency: Secunderabad
- Established: 2008
- Total electors: 2,64,969
- Reservation: None

Member of Legislative Assembly
- 3rd Telangana Legislative Assembly
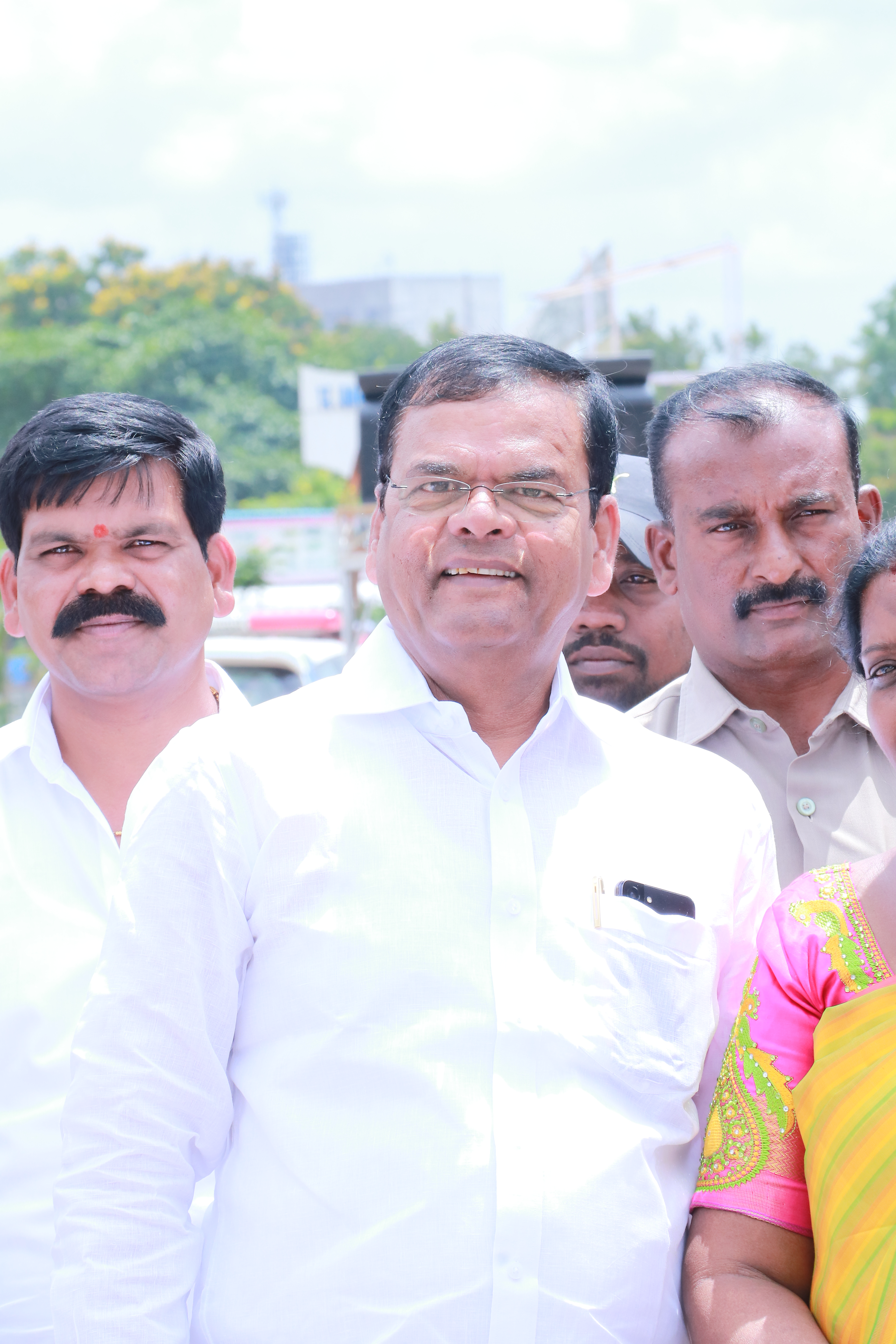
- Incumbent Kaleru Venkatesh
- Party: BRS
- Elected year: 2018

Amberpet Assembly constituency is a constituency of Telangana Legislative Assembly, India. It is one of 15 constituencies in the capital city of Hyderabad. It is part of Secunderabad Lok Sabha constituency.

Kaleru Venkatesh is the Member of Legislative Assembly representing TRS from Amberpet Assembly constituency, winning the 2018 Telangana Legislative Assembly election by defeating G. Kishan Reddy of BJP. He won for the second time in the 2023 Assembly election.

== Extent of the constituency ==
Amberpet was carved out of Himayat Nagar Assembly constituency before the 2009 elections as per Delimitation Act of 2002.

The Assembly Constituency presently comprises the following neighbourhoods:

Neighbourhood
Amberpet
Tilaknagar
Golnaka
Barkatpura
Shivam Road
Kachiguda (part)
Nallakunta (part)
Bagh Lingampally (part)
Vidyanagar (part)

== Members of the Legislative Assembly ==
Election	Member	Party
2009	G. Kishan Reddy	Bharatiya Janata Party
2014	G. Kishan Reddy	Bharatiya Janata Party
2018	Kaleru Venkatesh	Bharat Rashtra Samithi
2023	Kaleru Venkatesh	Bharat Rashtra Samithi

Andhra Pradesh

== Election results ==
=== Assembly Election 2023 ===
2023 Telangana Legislative Assembly election : Amberpet
Party	Candidate	Votes	%	±%
BRS	Kaleru Venkatesh	74,416	50.80	New
BJP	Chenaboyanna Krishna Yadav	49,879	34.05	▼11.48
INC	Dr. Rohin Kumar Reddy. C	18,004	12.29	New
NOTA	None of the above	1,317	0.90	▼0.20
Margin of victory		24,537	16.75	▲15.99
Turnout		146,499	52.86	▼2.81
Total valid votes		146,488		
Registered electors		277,125		▲14.73
BRS gain from BRS		Swing	▲4.51	

=== Assembly Election 2018 ===
2018 Telangana Legislative Assembly election : Amberpet
Party	Candidate	Votes	%	±%
BRS	Kaleru Venkatesh	61,558	46.29	▲33.36
BJP	G. Kishan Reddy	60,542	45.53	▼10.39
TJS	Nijjana Ramesh	4,261	3.20	New
NOTA	None of the above	1,462	1.10	▲0.70
Bahujana Left Party	Gadapa Sreehari Gangaputra	1,302	0.98	New
Independent	Bathula Ravi	1,052	0.79	New
Margin of victory		1,016	0.76	▼42.23
Turnout		134,463	55.67	▲0.49
Total valid votes		132,977		
Registered electors		241,545		▼8.85
BRS gain from BJP		Swing	▼9.63	

=== Assembly Election 2014 ===
2014 Telangana Legislative Assembly election : Amberpet
Party	Candidate	Votes	%	±%
BJP	G. Kishan Reddy	81,430	55.92	▲6.56
BRS	Aedla Sudhakar Reddy	18,832	12.93	▲6.87
AIMIM	Naliganti Sharath Babu	17,536	12.04	New
INC	V. Hanumanta Rao	16,975	11.66	▼14.96
YSRCP	Mohammed	2,692	1.85	New
CPI(M)	M. Mahender	1,859	1.28	New
LSP	Jagan Mohan Metla	1,380	0.95	▼4.25
NOTA	None of the above	583	0.40	New
Margin of victory		62,598	42.99	▲20.25
Turnout		146,233	55.18	▼4.17
Total valid votes		145,606		
Registered electors		265,008		▲31.18
BJP hold		Swing	▲6.56	

=== Assembly Election 2009 ===
2009 Andhra Pradesh Legislative Assembly election : Amberpet
Party	Candidate	Votes	%	±%
BJP	G. Kishan Reddy	59,134	49.36	New
INC	Mohd. Fareeduddin	31,891	26.62	New
PRP	G. Srinivas Goud	9,742	8.13	New
BRS	K. Jagdishwar	7,264	6.06	New
LSP	C. Vinod Yadav	6,234	5.20	New
SP	Krishna Yadav. C	2,996	2.50	New
Margin of victory		27,243	22.74	
Turnout		119,901	59.35	
Total valid votes		119,800		
Registered electors		202,014		
BJP win (new seat)				

== See also ==
- Amberpet
- List of constituencies of Telangana Legislative Assembly
