= Bonthu Rammohan =

Indian politician

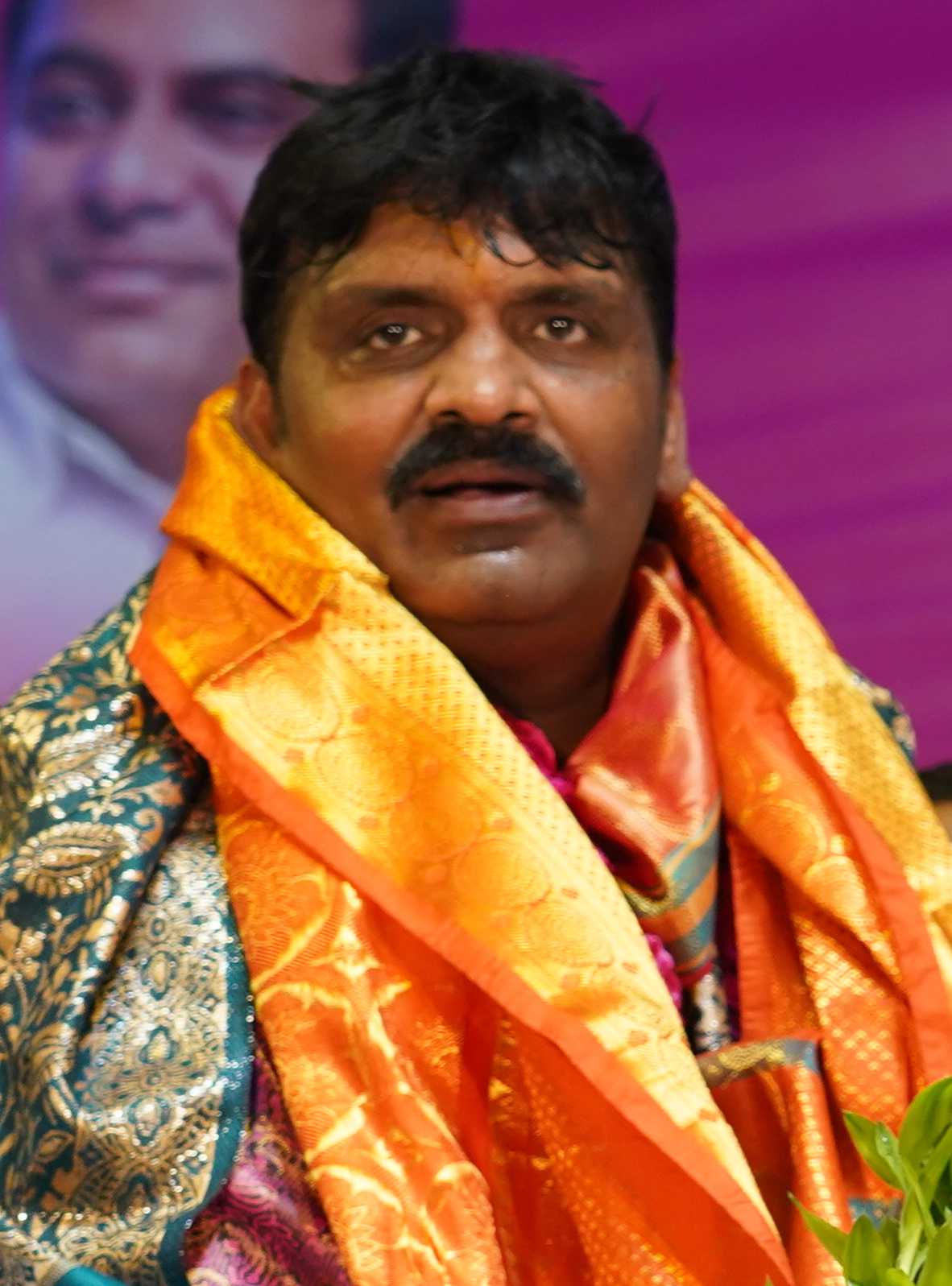
- Rammohan in 2023

3rd Mayor of Hyderabad
- In office 11 February 2016 – 10 February 2021
- Deputy: Baba Fasiuddin
- Preceded by: Mohammad Majid Hussain
- Succeeded by: Gadwal Vijayalakshmi
- Constituency: Cherlapally

Personal details
- Born: 5 July 1973 (age 53) Warangal, Telangana, India
- Party: Indian National Congress (since 2024)
- Other political affiliations: Bharat Rashtra Samithi (2003–2024)
- Spouse: Bonthu Sridevi (m. 2004)
- Education: Osmania University

Bonthu Rammohan (born 5 July 1973) is an Indian politician who was the Mayor of Hyderabad from 2016 to 2020. He belonged to the Telangana Rashtra Samithi party, but moved to the Indian National Congress in February 2024.

== Early life ==
Bonthu was born in the village of Amanagal in the district of Warangal to Venkatayya and Kamalamma.

== Personal life ==
He married Sridevi on 7 February 2004 and has two daughters, Kujitha and Ushasri.

== Education and student politics ==
He completed his primary and secondary education in Mahabubabad and later attended SSC Junior College for his higher secondary education. Bonthu initially attended Adarsh College in Warangal for his tertiary education, but later transferred to Osmania University in Hyderabad.

As a student of Osmania University, he took an interest in student politics. He was an ABVP leader in his time in university and was quite active in the organisation.

== Political career ==
His political career started in 2002 just after the TRS party was born with an agenda to achieve separate statehood. He left the ABVP to join the TRS and participated actively in the agitation. This eventually led him to being appointed the TRS Youth Wing State President by party chief K. Chandrashekar Rao.

Rammohan campaigned for the Uppal seat in 2018. He was one of the active participants in the TRS party Bahiranga Sabhas.

Rammohan and his wife Sridevi Yadav, the Cherlapally division corporator, joined the Indian National Congress in the presence of Deepa Dasmunshi, the AICC in-charge of Telangana, on 16 February 2024.

He was appointed as Telangana Pradesh Congress Committee (TPCC) Vice President on 9 June 2025.
