= Nerella Sharada =

Indian politician

Chairperson of the Telangana State Women Commission
- Incumbent
- Assumed office 24 September 2026 - Incumbent; 17 July 2024- 7 January 2026
- Preceded by: Sunitha Laxma Reddy
- Succeeded by: Gadwal Vijayalakshmi

Ex-Telangana Pradesh Congress Committee (TPCC) Mahila wing President

Secretary, All India Mahila Congress
- In office 2014- 2021

Member of Telangana Congress Committee Executive Committee

Personal details
- Born: Karimnagar, TG, India
- Party: Indian National Congress
- Spouse: N. Anjaneyalu Goud

Nerella Sharada is a women's rights activist, an Indian National Congress politician and an executive committee member of Telangana Pradesh Congress Committee (TPCC). She is state president of the women's wing of the TPCC and secretary of the All India Mahila Congress.

== Early life ==
Nerella Sharada was born in Karimnagar district in telangana .

== Career ==
She was elected as a President of Zilla Parshad in Karimnagar. In October 2004 she was nominated as member-secretary for TPCC Ethics Committee.

In September 2018, Sharada joined protests against the BJP central government over rising fuel prices.

In February 2019, Sharada criticised the Bharat Rashtra Samithi (TRS) government for nepotism and failure to promote women into ministerial positions. In April, she claimed the state government's failures in the handling of examination results had led to student suicides.

In March 2024 She was appointed as Chairperson of Telangana State Commission for Women and she assumed charge at Buddha Bhavan on 17 July 2024.

Nerella Sharada assumed charge as the Women’s commission chief for the second time on 24 September 2026.
