= Amberpet =

- Neighbourhood
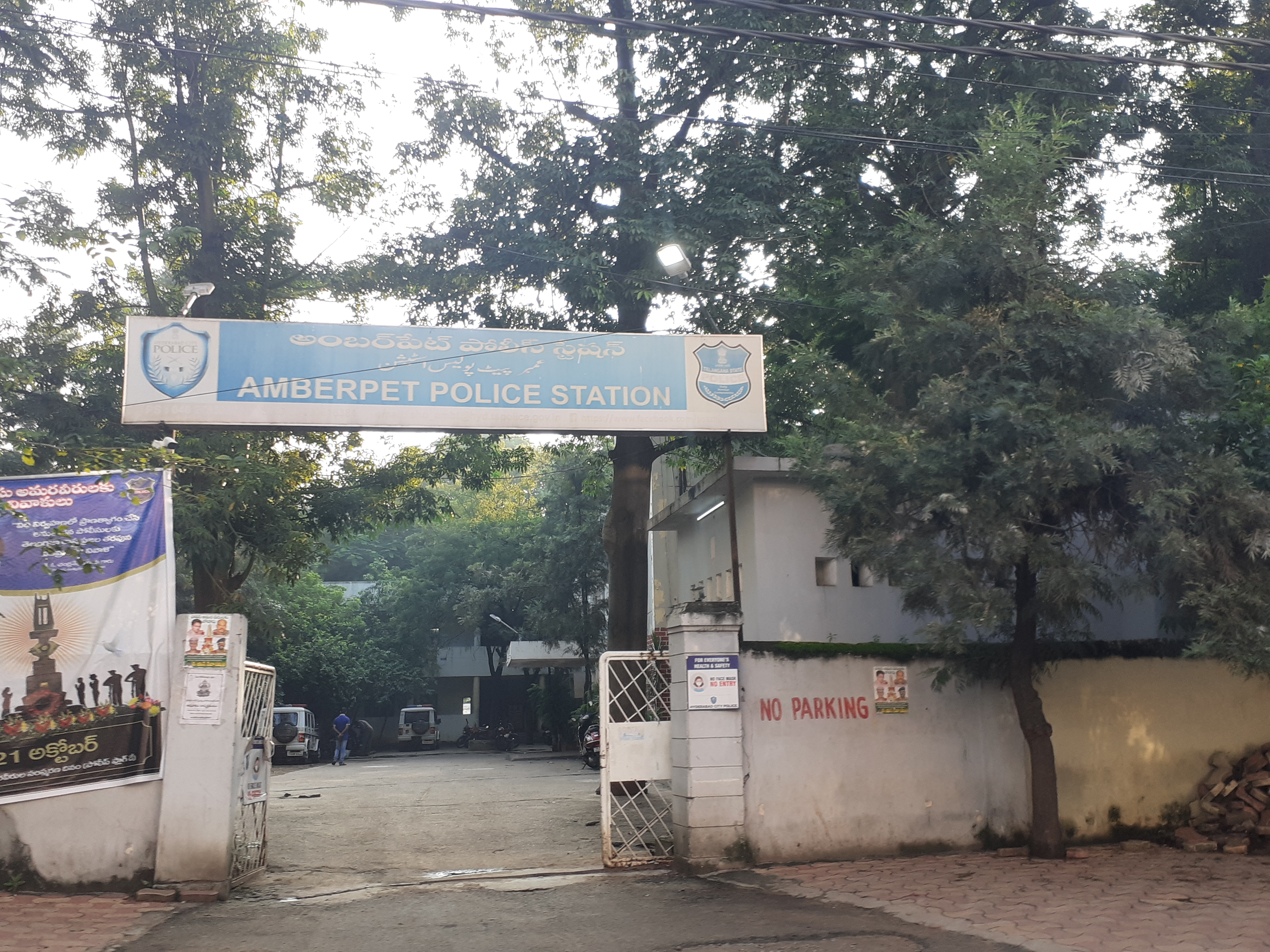
- Amberpet police station
- Nickname: Amber Shah Miya Qibla
- Location in Hyderabad, Telangana, India Amberpet (Telangana) Amberpet (India)
- Coordinates: 17.390941°N 78.523493°E
- Country: India
- State: Telangana
- District: Hyderabad District
- Metro: Hyderabad Metropolitan Region

Government
  - Body: GHMC

Languages
  - Official: Telugu
- Time zone: UTC+5:30 (IST)
- PIN: 500013
- Vehicle registration: TG 11
- Lok Sabha constituency: Secunderabad
- Vidhan Sabha constituency: Amberpet
- Planning agency: GHMC, HMDA

Amberpet is one of the oldest suburbs of Hyderabad, India. Amberpet lies adjacent to Osmania University. It is also a Mandal in Hyderabad District. Its area stretches from Kachiguda to Ramanthapur in the East

== Introduction ==
Amberpet is the combination of two distinct words; 'Ambar', which is Persian for ambergis, and 'pēṭa', which is Telugu for town, rendered pēṭ in Dakhini and the word Amberpet literally translates into "Ambergis town". Amber also refers to sky, and hence, Amberpet may also means highland or land of the skies. Amberpet is home to Osmania University, which was built in 1908 by the last Nizam of Hyderabad State, Mir Osman Ali Khan.

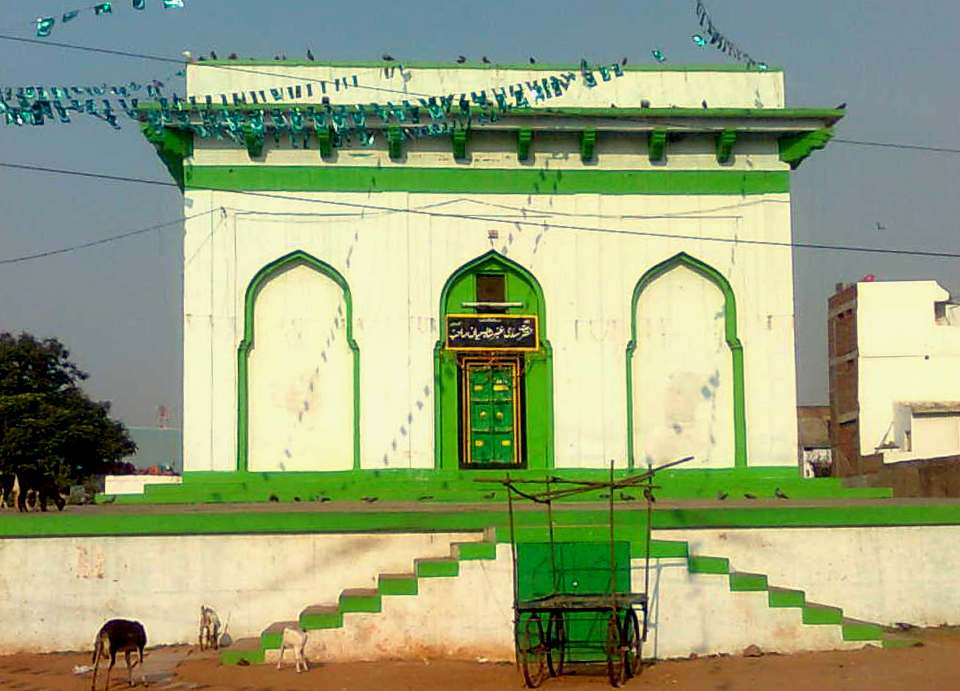
Shrine of Amber Shah Baba, Amberpet, Hyderabad

Its area stretches from Kachiguda in the West to Ramanthapur in the East, and from Vidyanagar in the north to Azadnagar in the South. The Civil Police Lines Special Armed Reserve (CPL-SAR) of the Andhra Pradesh Police Academy is also located adjacent to the Amber Baba Dargah. The area was populated as a local market for all the household needs catering to all nearby locales at very affordable prices. Now, these have been replaced by Malls, Super Markets, hi-end businesses lining the main road.

== History ==
Established as a farming community on the banks of the northern side of the Musi river in the 18th century Amberpet lent its name to the famous Sufi saint Amber Baba, who is also believed to be one of the advisers to Mughal Emperor Aurangazeb at that time. The Dargah of Amber baba is located right on the main road, which draws crowd from all over the place on its annual Urs. Many believe that this place, once barren, was miraculously propagated and populated into dense forest, fruit-growing fields, after Sufi Saint Amber baba made this place his final destination. Once a sub-urban area, this place has turned into a major hub for trade and Educational Institutes.

Many masjids of Amberpet belongs to the Qutub Shahi era and it is line up the main road leading to Warangal. Amberpet is home to second largest mosque in the city i.e. Qutub Shahi Masjid also known as Bade Masjid. Under the leadership of Syed Chand Patel Sahab, this mosque was expanded to accommodate more than 1,000 worshippers and now it is considered largest Mosque next to Makkah Masjid near Charminar in terms of worshippers. Osmania Public School was also built during the expansion of Qutub Shahi Masjid which is adjacent to the mosque

Amberpet has its cultural and religious image. This place is surrounded by many temples. Sri Mahankali Temple (Amberpet Main Road), Jai Veer Hanuman Temple (Beside Sri Ramana Theatre), Sri Ram Mandir (6 no. X roads), Shivam Temple (Shivam Road) are some of the frequently visited temples by the devotees of Amberpet.

== Landmarks ==
- Guruvaurappan Temple
- Sri Ramana Theatre
- Quadri Bagh
- Shivam temple
- Sufi Amber Baba Dargah
- Gandhi Statue
- MCH Ground/Eid Gah
- Central Police Lines (CPL)
- Bathukamma Kunta
- Irani Hotel
- Jaiswal Garden
- Ali Cafe Circle
- Badi Masjid
- Sri Mahankali Temple
- MCH Kaaman
- Ram Reddy Nagar
- Patel Nagar
- Bilal Masjid
- Masjid E Hussani (Ahmed Nagar)

== Transport ==
Amberpet is well-connected by road networks and the Hyderabad-Warangal state highway passes through Amberpet. The closest railway network is of 1 km away i.e. Kachiguda railway station which is in close proximity to the Mumbai-Vijaywada national highway. The closest MMTS train station is around a kilometre away at Kachiguda or Vidyanagar.

TSRTC connects buses from various parts of the city to Amberpet. 107, 71, 115 and 113 bus services pass through Amberpet.
