= Andhra Mahasabha =

Hyderabad-based people's organisation

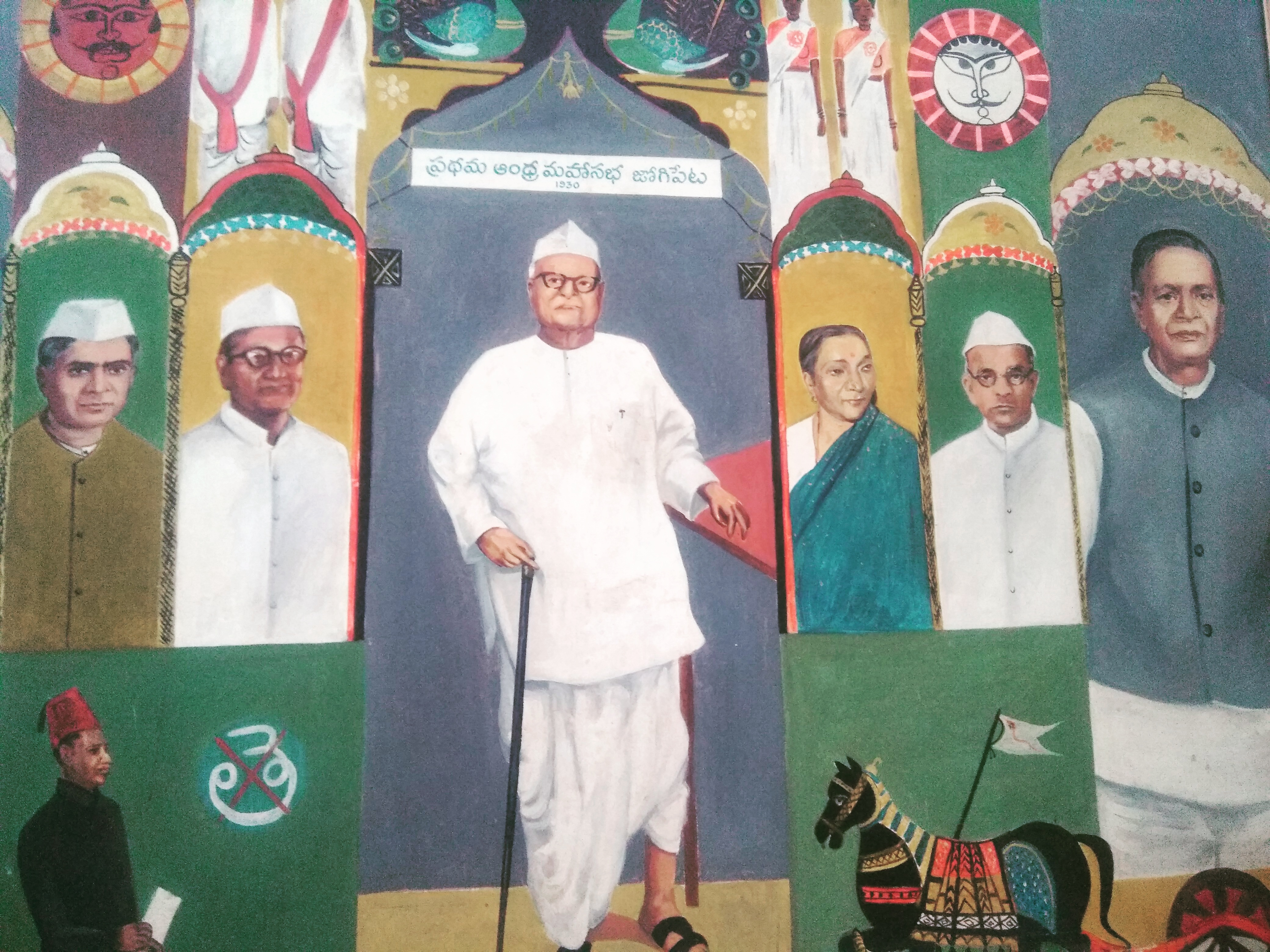
A painting portrays the First Andhra Mahasabha held at Jogipeta in 1930

Andhra Mahasabha (IAST: Āndhra mahāsabha) was a people's organisation in the erstwhile Hyderabad state of India. It was an association started by Telugu people of Telangana region against Nizam rule. The people of Telangana formed the Andhra Mahasabha as they could not tolerate the injustice being done to the Telugu language and Telugu culture. In the late 1920s, under the leadership of Madapati Hanumantha Rao, the Telugu people united and formed a union and organized 13 Andhra Mahasabhas from 1930 to 1945. The activities of the Andhra Mahasabha in the Telangana region created awareness among the people against the Nizam and led to the armed struggle in Telangana. Chief among the people who led the Andhra Mahasabha were: Madapati Hanumantha Rao, Ravi Narayana Reddy, Suravaram Prathapareddy, Baddam Ella Reddy, Burgula Ramakrishna Rao, Dasarathi Krishnamacharya, Susarla Srirama Narasimham, Pulijala Venkatarangarao, Allampalli Venkatarama Rao, Kaloji Narayana Rao, Konda Venkata Rangareddy, Vattikota Alvaraswami, Potlapalli. Rama Rao, Arutla Ramachandra Reddy, and many more.

== History ==
An organization was originally started under the name Andhra Janasangham (transl. Andhra People's Society) in November 1921. Hyderabad was the largest of all the Indian Princely States, with a population of sixteen million. The territory of the state included present-day Telangana, Marathwada (Maharashtra) and parts of Karnataka. 88 percent of the population were Hindus, and most of the rest were Muslims. During the Nizam's rule, religious freedom was very limited. Once Dussehra festival and Muharram (Festival of Peers) came at the same time. Government has conducted only Moharram in all government colleges. Due to the royal devotion of the British government of the Nawab, special attention was paid to the Christians. It started with a mere 12 members after a failed attempt to pass a resolution in Telugu at Nizam's Social Reforms Conference in Hyderabad. Membership quickly increased to about a hundred and its first conference was held in February 1922 under the chairmanship of Konda Venkata Ranga Reddy with Madapati Hanumantha Rao as its secretary.

It was in 1928 when Madapati Hanumantha Rao took the lead to form Andhra Maha Sabha. First conference was held in 1930 at Jogipet under the chairmanship of Suravaram Pratapareddy.

== Formation ==
In 1922, a Hindu social gathering was held at the Vivekavardini Theater in Hyderabad. All the speeches in that meeting were held in Urdu and Marathi languages. Only one speaker, Allampati Venkata Rama Rao - a pleader, was going to speak in Telugu, but all the members jeered and circled him and did not let him speak. In those days the number of Maharashtrians in Hyderabad city was very less than Telugus. However, they used to show their superiority in all fields. Telugu language had no courtesy and forgiveness. Madapati Hanumantha Rao has described the plight of those days in his history of the Andhra Mahasabha. Some young people who noticed the insult done to the Telugu language and the Telugu speaker in that assembly, came together and founded the "Andhrajana Sangam" (Association of Andhra People) with the ambition to give a proper place to the Andhra language and culture in the city. That was the beginning of the Andhra movement in Nizam's state. Two years later, the Nizam formed an Andhrajana Kendra Sangham (Central Association of Andhra People) to unite all the Telugu organizations in the state. Meetings of this society were held every year. They discussed about the steps to be taken for the development of Andhra language and Andhra culture and the pros and cons. Any Telugu organization in the Nizam's state could send its representative to this central association. Madapati Hanumantha Rao was the secretary of this central association.The central association used to send campaigners and support the development of Telugu organizations in the state. During this period the association published two important pamphlets, "Vettichakiri" and "Vartaka Sangam." (Business Association).

== Events in Andhra Mahasabhas ==
- First Andhra Mahasabha

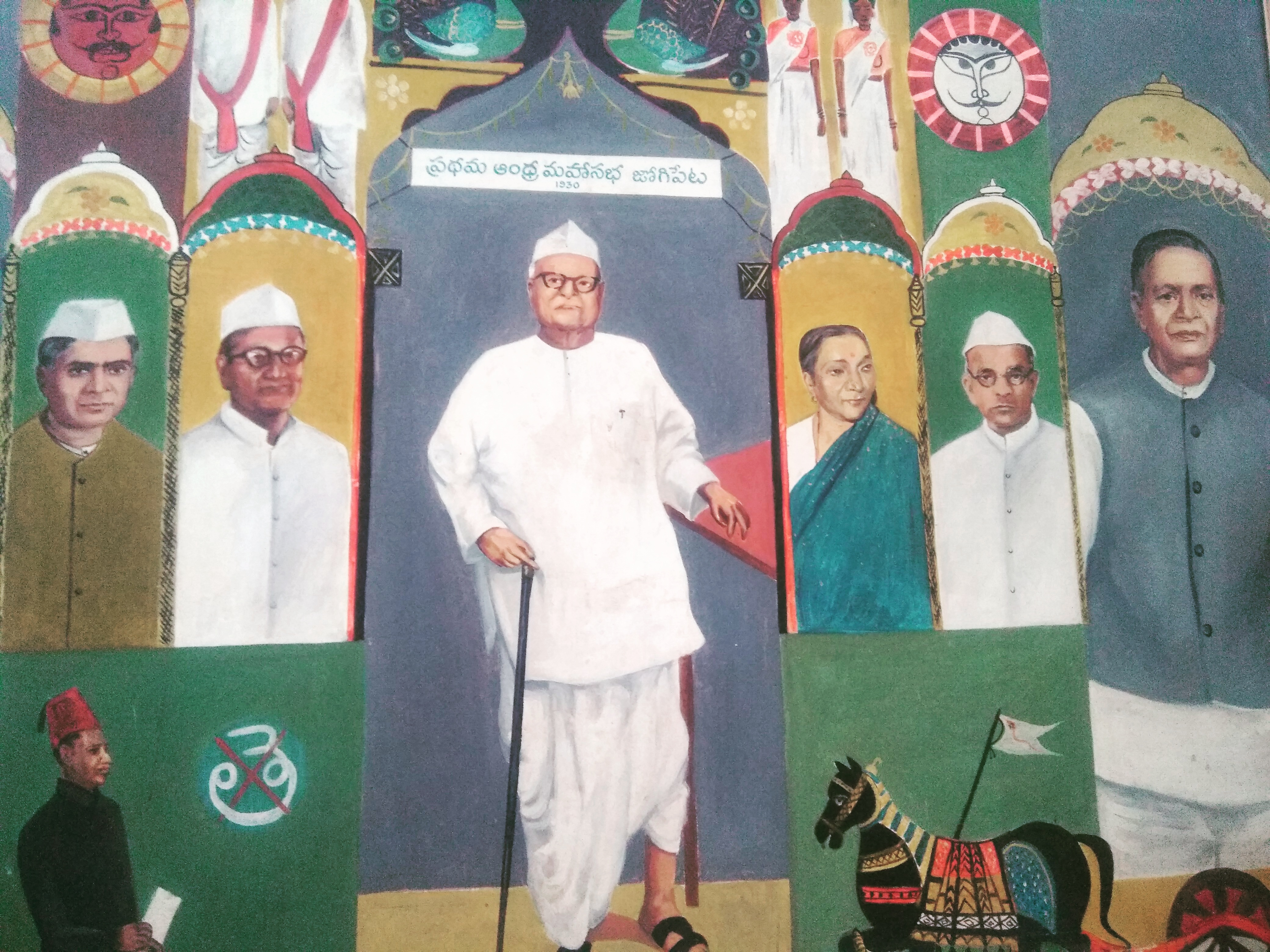
Picture of First Andhra Mahasabha painted by M.Jayanth

The sporadic movements for the revival of Telugu language and culture under the leadership of the Andhrajana Kendra Sangam and against the feudal oppressions reached the Revolution in the higher level like a great river joining all the streams. In 1930, the First Andhra Mahasabha was held at Jogipet. All the Telugu movements of the state came and met in that Mahasabha. Every person who has paid a fee of 1 Rupee. At that time there was no specific rules for this conference. It was presided over by Suravaram Pratapa Reddy.Although there were other issues in this Mahasabha, social issues were discussed seriously. The Mahasabha passed resolutions on child marriages and widow marriages. Vaman Nayak, a Marathi leader, played a leading role in this assembly. It is enough to say an incident that happened in that meeting to show that the people did not have proper awareness till then. A Harijan leader named Bhagya Reddy came as a representative to the Mahasabha. When he was about to speak on an issue, some of the noble traders left the meeting in disagreement. Nadimpally Sundaramma became the first President for Andhra Mahila Sabha. However in the meeting the upper hand goes to the orthodox people.
