= Palm Valley, Hyderabad =

Palm Valley Tadban
- neighbourhood, Businesses
- Tadban
- Country: India
- State: Telangana
- District: Hyderabad
- Metro: Hyderabad
- Time zone: UTC+5:30 (IST)
- PIN: 500 064
- Vehicle registration: TS 12, 13
- Vidhan Sabha constituency: Bahadurpura (Assembly constituency)
- Planning agency: GHMC

Palm Valley, or Tadban (Telugu: తడ్బాన్, romanized: Taḍbān, lit. 'Palm Valley'), is a region in Hyderabad, Telangana, India. It is part of the Bahadurpura constituency. The names Tadban and Palm Valley come from the multitude of palm trees (taḍ) that grew in the area in the late 19th century. It is close to Mir Alam Tank.

== Area ==
The Valley is divided into three regions: Central Road, K.J. Hills, and X-Roads. The area under central denotes from the police station to the end of the vegetable market; the inside sub-region is marked as K.J. Hills; while the area on the outskirts of Palm Valley is considered as X-Roads.

== Education ==
Between the 1990s and the 2010s, the local literacy level increased to a great extent. Local schools include:

- MANIS HIGH SCHOOL INDRA NAGAR TADBAN
- Boston Mission High School
- Al-Suffa Mission High School
- Government Boys' School (Galbalguda & KaliKamaan)
- Kilpatrik Mission High School
- St. Marys High School
- St. Alphonsa High School

== Landmarks ==
National Highway 44 passes near Nehru Zoological Park. The same highway connects to Rajiv Gandhi International Airport in Hyderabad.

Other landmarks include:

- Aashoor Khana
- Nayeem Complex Tadban x Road
- Eidgah Mir Alam
- Electricity Junction
- K.J Hills
- Miralam Water Reservoir
- Miralam Lake
- Police Station
- Shah Function Palace
- Vegetable Market
- Jamia Masjid Siddiq-e-Akbar. (Behind kalapathar P.S)
