= Madapati Hanumantha Rao =

Indian politician

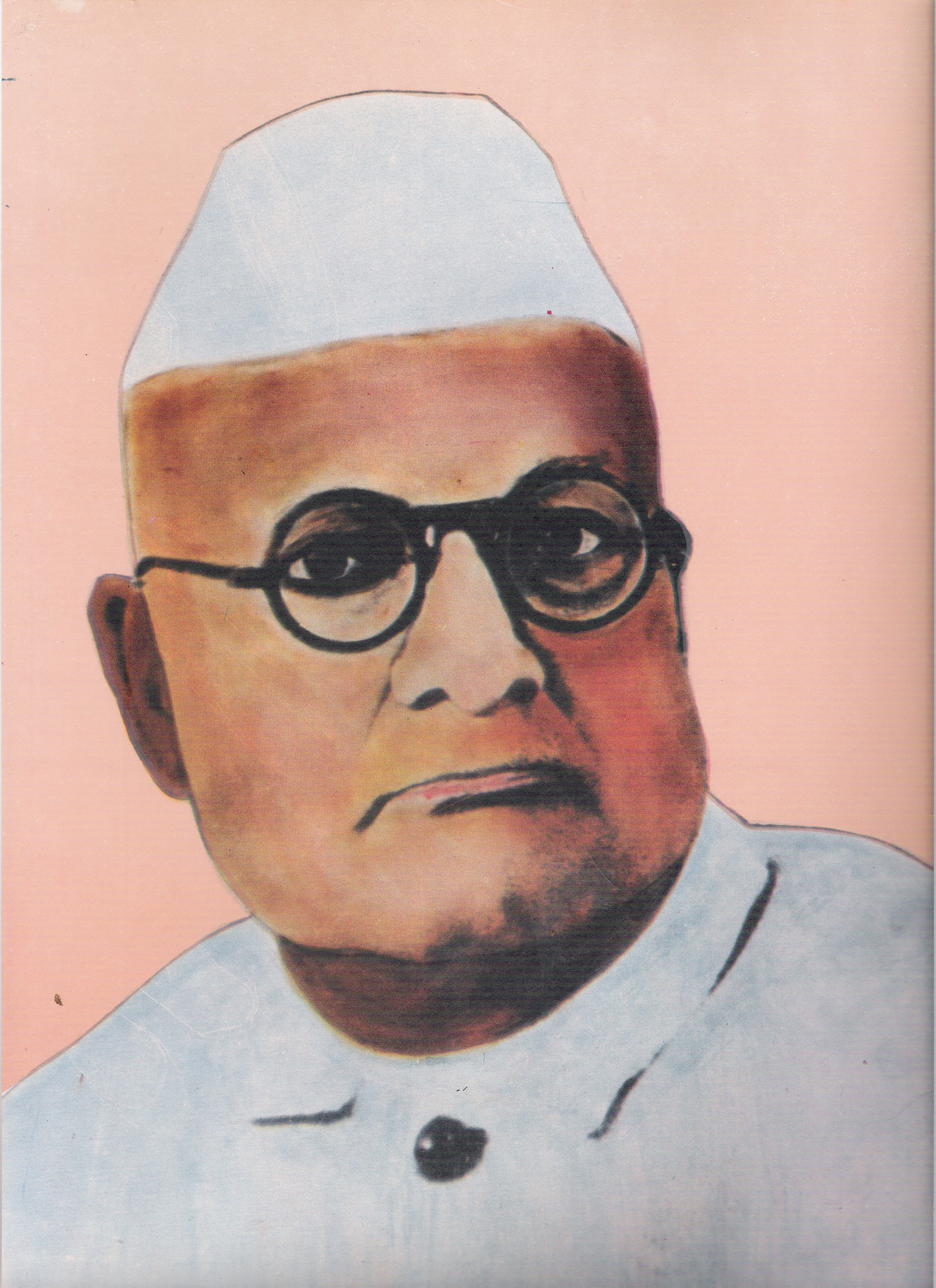
- Indian statesman, poet and a short-story writer

Andhra Pradesh Legislative council

Personal details
- Born: January 22, 1885 Pokkunuru, Nandigama Taluk, Krishna district
- Died: November 11, 1970 (aged 85)

Madapati Hanumantha Rao (22 January 1885 – 11 November 1970) was an Indian statesman, poet and a short-story writer. He was the first Mayor of Hyderabad from 1951 to 1954. He is also a Padma Bhushan recipient.

== Revival of the Telugu Language in Nizam's Dominion ==
He helped to found the Andhra Mahasabha. He came to be called the Andhra Pitamaha.

== Public worker ==
He was a member of the Senate and Syndicate of Osmania University.

He held political meetings outside the limits of the Hyderabad state. The first Hyderabad political conference was held in Kakinada in 1923, due to the initiative taken by M. Hanumantha Rao.
