= Sultan-ul-Uloom Education Society =

Education Focused Non-Profit in India

- Formation: 1980
- Location: Hyderabad, Telangana, India
- Previous Chairman: Khan Lateef Mohammed Khan
- Current Chairman: Zafar Javeed
- Website: sultanululoom.ac.in

The Sultan-ul-Uloom Education Society is a non-profit organisation based in Hyderabad, India, which aimed at providing quality education to minority students. It runs several educational institutions in the city.

== History ==
Sultan-ul-Uloom Education Society was established in 1980 under the aegis of Sultan-ul-Uloom Education Society whose chief patron is Prince Muffakham Bahadur. It is a Co-education institution affiliated with the Central Board of Secondary Education (CBSE). Housed in a huge campus at Banjara Hills, it aims at imparting holistic education to children from Nursery to Class X.

== Campus ==
The 22-acre SUES campus is located in Banjara Hills.

== Institutions ==
- Muffakham Jah College of Engineering and Technology
- Amjad Ali Khan College of Business Administration
- Ghulam Ahmed College of Education
- Sultan-ul-Uloom College of Pharmacy
- Sultan-ul-Uloom College of Law
- Sultan-ul-Uloom Public School
