= Kachiguda =

Kachiguda Kacheguda
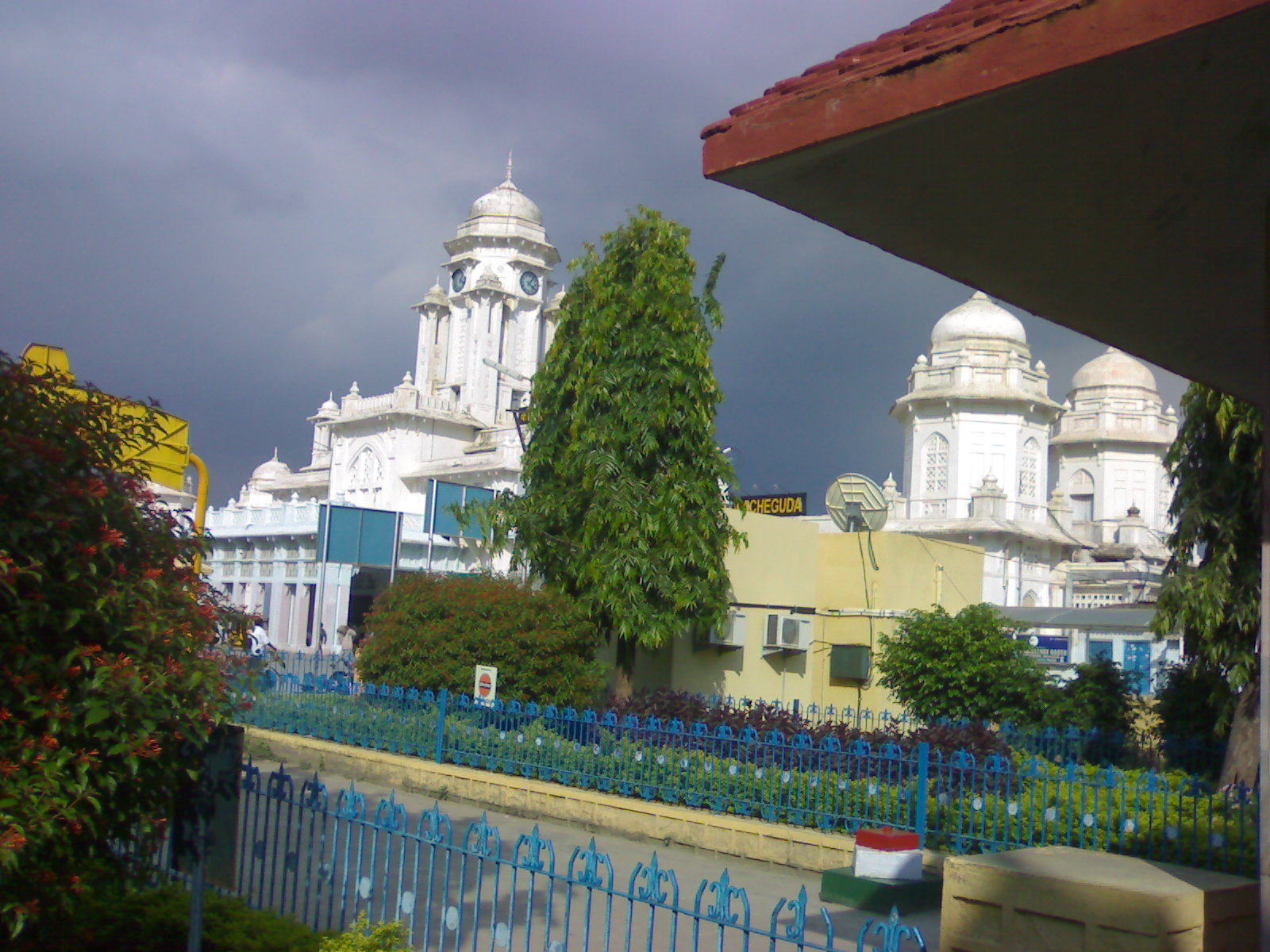
- Kachiguda Railway Station

- Location in Hyderabad, India Kachiguda (India)
- Coordinates: 17.391269°N 78.49524°E
- Country: India
- State: Telangana
- District: Hyderabad
- Metro: Hyderabad

Government
  - Body: Greater Hyderabad Municipal Corporation

Languages
  - Official: Telugu
- Time zone: UTC+5:30 (IST)
- PIN: 500 027
- Lok Sabha constituency: Secunderabad
- Vidhan Sabha constituency: Amberpet
- Planning agency: GHMC

Kachiguda (Telugu : కాచిగూడ ) is one of the old neighbourhoods in Hyderabad, Telangana, India. The third largest railway station in Hyderabad, Kacheguda railway station, built during the Nizam rule, is a major landmark of Kachiguda.

== Locality ==
Kachiguda business activities include textiles, ready-made garments, and footwear for economical buyers.

There is also a hotel, Tourist Plaza Hotel, which was recently rebuilt. The locality also has various other hotels and restaurants.

There is a Shri Khatu Shyam Baba temple where khatu shyam(barbarika) is worshipped as lord krishna, and this temple is popularly known as veeranna gutta as the self arisen idol of lord veerabadra was found first in the temple, which is located in front of the railway station, providing services such as free physiotherapy, free food to poor people at lunch time, and daily prasad offered to all devotees who come for darshan of Shri Shyam Baba.

Kachiguda Mahakali Mandir is famous for Ugadi, Bonalu, Vijayadashami and Deepawali festivals. Kachiguda also has the second biggest Lord Shri Ganesh Idol in Chappal Bazar during Ganesh Festival and also for Bonalu Festival in the twin cities of Hyderabad and Secunderabad.

There is a lord Ganesha Temple where people from different places come to take the blessings.

Kachiguda also has a mosque, Masjid Shah Miyan.

== Transport ==
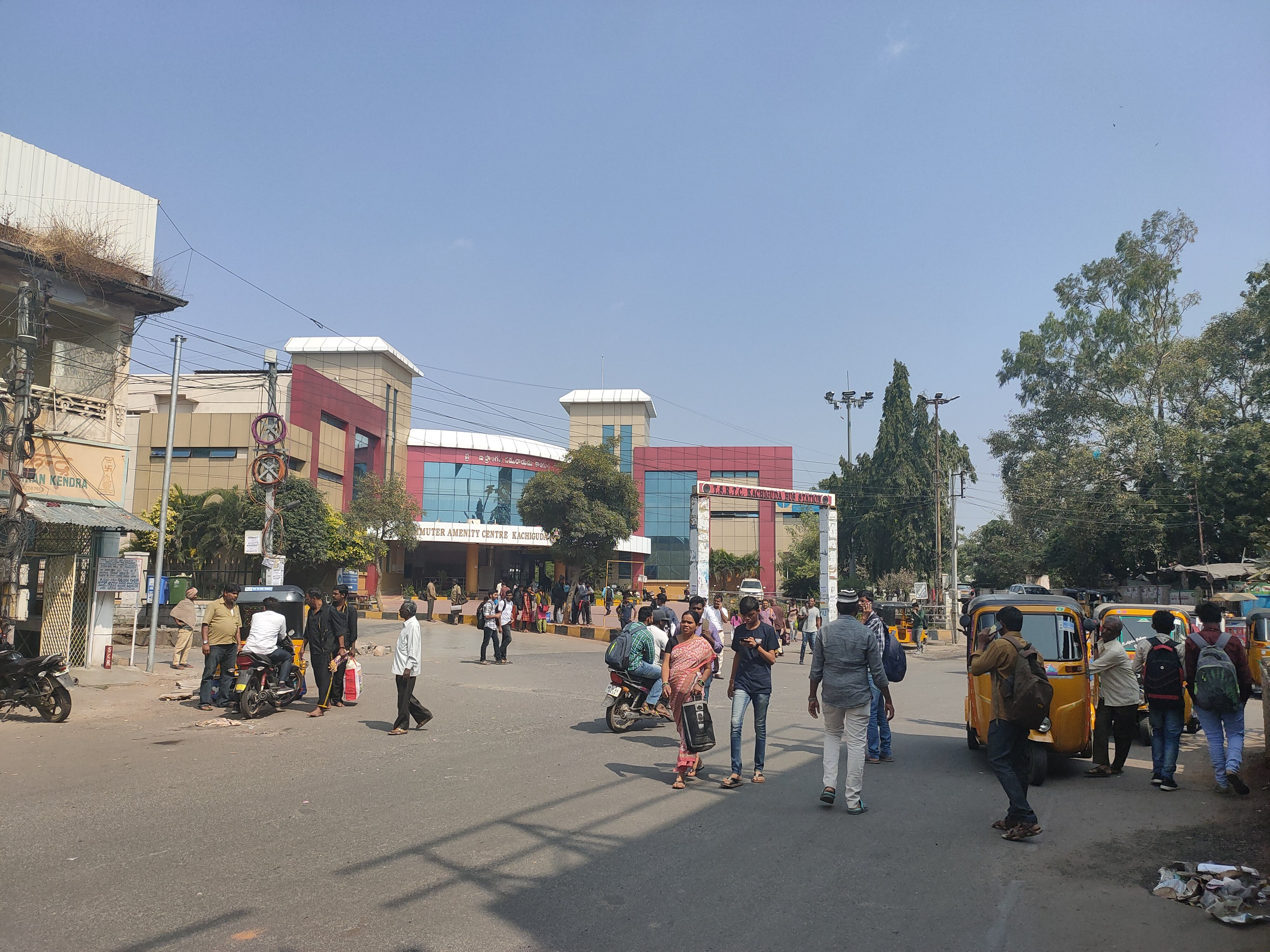
Kacheguda TSRTC bus station

Kacheguda railway station is a very important railway station, and its significance is growing, as trains from northern India to southern India pass through Kachiguda Railway Station.

Kachiguda is connected by buses run by TSRTC. Since a bus depot is located here, it is well connected to other cities. 89 bus services operate. The MMTS train service is operates at the Kacheguda railway station, connecting it to major parts of the Hyderabad.

== Education ==
There are several educational institutions located in Kachiguda:

- Nrupatunga educational Institutions
- Badruka educational Institutions
- RG Kedia College of Commerce
- St. Francis Junior College
- Haindavi Degree College
- Deeksha model school

== Hospitals ==
- Sri Venkatesh Borgoankar Nursing Home
- Sri Sai Krishna Neuro Hospital
- Shalini Children's Hospital
- C. C. Shroff Hospital
- Bristlecone Hospital
- Prathima Hospital
