= Laxminarayana Mudiraj =

Indian politician

Personal details
- Born: 1929 Hyderabad, Hyderabad State
- Died: 4 March 2015 (aged 86) Hyderabad, Telangana, India
- Children: 2 sons, 5 daughters, 10 grand children and 5 great grand children

Laxminarayana Mudiraj (1929 – 4 March 2015) was an Indian politician who served as Mayor of Hyderabad and as MLA. He was the Hyderabad City Mayor for the year 1969–1970. He participated in the Quit India Movement and struggle for liberation of Hyderabad State and against the Razakars in 1947–48.

== Biography ==
Laxminarayana Mudiraj was born in Hyderabad State (Nizam dominion). He was elected as MLA from Maharajgunj constituency in the year 1972.

=== Telangana movement ===
He was an ardent supporter of Telangana statehood. He defied orders of the then Chief Minister of Andhra Pradesh, Kasu Brahmananda Reddy and laid foundation stone for Telangana martyrs memorial, Gun Park, in 1969 agitation.

== Personal life ==
Mudiraj was married and has two sons and five daughters. He died on 3 March 2015 after a prolonged illness.
