= Golnaka =

- neighbourhood
- Country: India
- State: Telangana
- District: Hyderabad
- Metro: Hyderabad

Government
  - Body: GHMC

Languages
  - Official: Telugu
- Time zone: UTC+5:30 (IST)
- Postal code: 500013
- Lok Sabha constituency: Hyderabad
- Vidhan Sabha constituency: Amberpet
- Planning agency: GHMC

Golnaka is a suburb of Hyderabad, India. The national highway, NH 202, passes through the suburb.
