= Geography of Hyderabad =

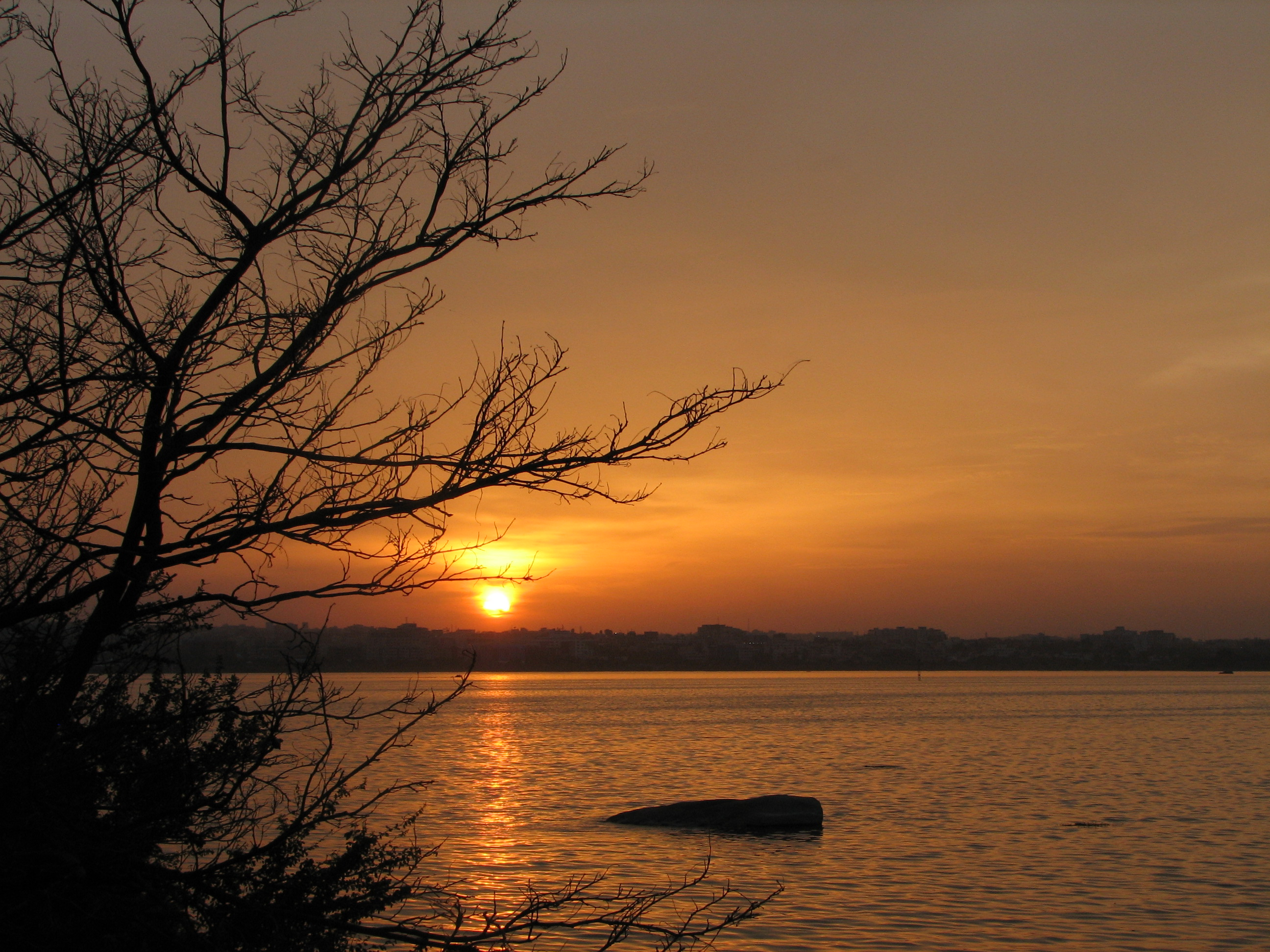
Hussain Sagar Lake

Hyderabad is located in central Telangana and is spread over an area of 2,500 km^{2}. The city lies in the Deccan Plateau and rises to an average height of 536 m above the sea level. The city lies at 17.366° N latitude and 78.476° E longitude.

Hyderabad possesses a unique landscape–spectacular rock formations which are about 2.5 billion years old; among the oldest and hardest rocks in the world. Rocky and hilly regions around the city are under obliteration for urbanization. Granite ridges and hillocks weathered into picturesque balancing forms are a part of the Deccan Shield area. Grey and Pink Granites are among the world's oldest. Crops are commonly grown in the surrounding paddy fields. The city's soil type is mainly red sandy with areas of black cotton soil. Hyderabad falls in the seismic zone-II and is seismically least exposed to earthquakes.

The highest point in the city is Banjara Hills. The contour level falls gradually from west to east creating almost a trough near the Musi River which runs through the city. This natural feature has facilitated water supply by gravity. Elevation within the city varies between 672 m in Banjara Hills and 456 m in Old City. Nearby Southern Border satellite towns like Shadnagar have an average elevation of about 650 m uniformly.

The original city of Hyderabad was founded on the banks of river Musi and has grown over centuries on the both banks of the river. Now known as the historic "Old City", home to the Charminar and Mecca Masjid, it lies on the southern bank of the river. The city center saw a shift to the north of the river, with the construction of many government buildings and landmarks. Hyderabad and Secunderabad are called as 'Twin cities' as they are closely linked with each other. A man made lake, known as the Hussain Sagar Lake, separates the two cities. The rapid growth of the city, along with the growth of Secunderabad and neighboring municipalities has resulted in a large and populous metropolitan area.

The Musi river originates from Anantagiri Hills (located 70 km south west of Hyderabad) and joins Krishna River near Wazirabad in Nalgonda district. There are two dams built on it – Osman Sagar and Himayat Sagar. Both these reservoirs constitute the major drinking water sources for Hyderabad city. These dams also prevented the city from flooding that encountered till the early decades of 20th century. Musi River was called Muchukunda River in pre-historic days. A few bridges cross the river; the oldest, called "Purana Pul" (literally meaning old bridge) was built during the 16th century by the Qutb Shahi sultans of Golconda.

Today, due to indiscriminate urbanization and lack of planning, the river has become a receptacle for all the untreated domestic and industrial waste waters coming out of Hyderabad and has therefore become polluted. Numerous efforts to clean it have failed. The river water downstream to city is highly polluted. Telangana's culture is a mix of South Indian and Persian traditions that were assimilated during the Mughal and Nizam eras.

== Geography ==
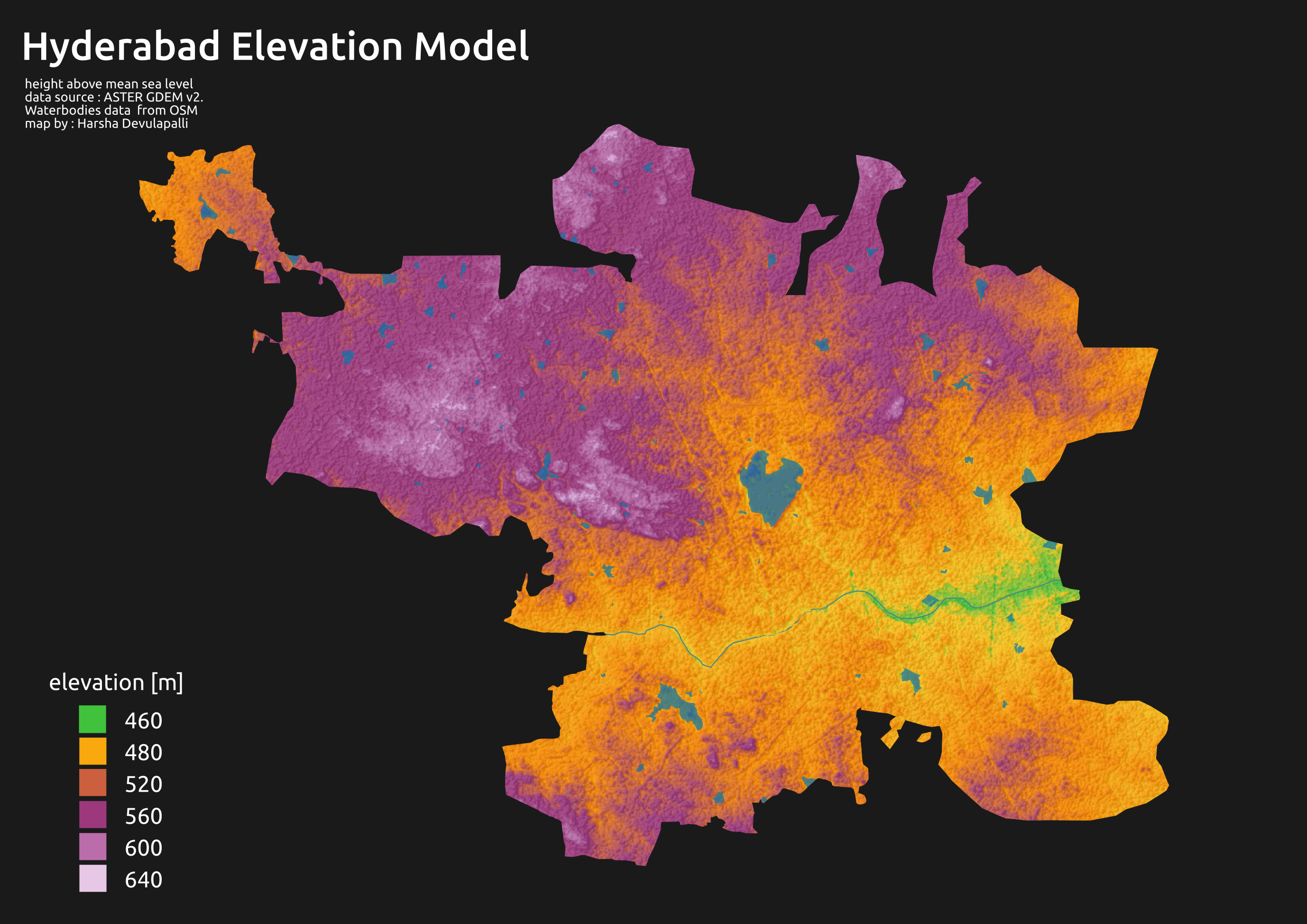
The elevation model of Hyderabad and Secunderabad areas, created using ASTER GDEM v2 Data.

Hyderabad, the capital of Indian state, Telangana, is located in the central part of the Telangana. Geographically the city is located in the northern part of Deccan Plateau, in Southern India on the banks of Musi River. The modern Hyderabad is spread over an area of 1,005 km^{2} (388 sq mi), making it one of the largest metros in India. The predominant topography of the city is sloping rocky terrain of grey and pink granites. Some locations with higher altitude are scattered throughout, giving rise to the appearance of several small hillocks. Hyderabad has an average altitude of about 1,778 feet (542 m) above mean sea Level (MSL), while the highest point in the city is Banjara Hills at 2,206 feet (672 m). The city houses multiple lakes and large water tanks. The lakes in the city are often referred to as sagar which means sea. The Hussain Sagar lake, built in 1562, is located at the heart of the city. The Osman Sagar and Himayat Sagar are two artificial lakes created as a result of dams on Musi River. the Hyderabad houses 140 large and small size lakes in and around its neighborhood and As of 1996, there are 834 water tanks of below the size of 10 hectare.

== Neighborhoods ==
Historic locality established by Muhammad Quli Qutb Shah, on the southern banks of Musi river exists as the Old City, while the New City encompasses the urban sprawl largely on the northern bank of Musi River. The Old and New Cities are connected by multiple bridges over the river, with the bridge Purana pul being the oldest. Hyderabad is twinned with neighboring Secunderabad which is separated through Hussain Sagar lake. Both the twins come under the ambit of a single municipal unit of Greater Hyderabad. The ruined city of Golconda and Karwan in south and West of the city are the earliest settlement in Hyderabad.

The central Hyderabad developed during the Nizam's era since 18th century is the main nucleus of the city divided by the Musi river. The south of the Musi river in Central Hyderabad houses most of historical tourist attractions such as the Charminar, Mecca Masjid, Salar Jung Museum, The Nizam's Museum, High Court of Judicature at Hyderabad, the Falaknuma Palace, Chowmahalla Palace, Purani Haveli Palace and Mahbub mansion, the traditional retail corridor—(Laad Bazaar, Pearls Market and Madina circle) and also Mahatma Gandhi Bus Station, Hyderabad Race Club and Nehru Zoological Park. The North of the Musi river in central Hyderabad houses the; Osmania General Hospital, State Central Library, Hyderabad, Osmania Medical College and Women's college(former British Residency), Hyderabad Railway Station and Kachiguda Railway Station along with the CBD's such as; Begum Bazaar, Koti, Osman Gunj, Abids, Sultan Bazaar, Moazzam Jahi Market, Bank Street, Troop Bazaar (former French Barracks) and the residential cum commercial areas such as; King Kothi Palace, Basheer Bagh Palace, Himayatnagar, Reserve Bank of India, Telangana Secretariat, India Government Mint, Hyderabad, Telangana Legislature Assembly, Public Garden, Shahi Mosque, Nizam Club, Ravindra Bharathi, State museum, Police Commissioner's Office, Birla Temple, Birla Planetarium.

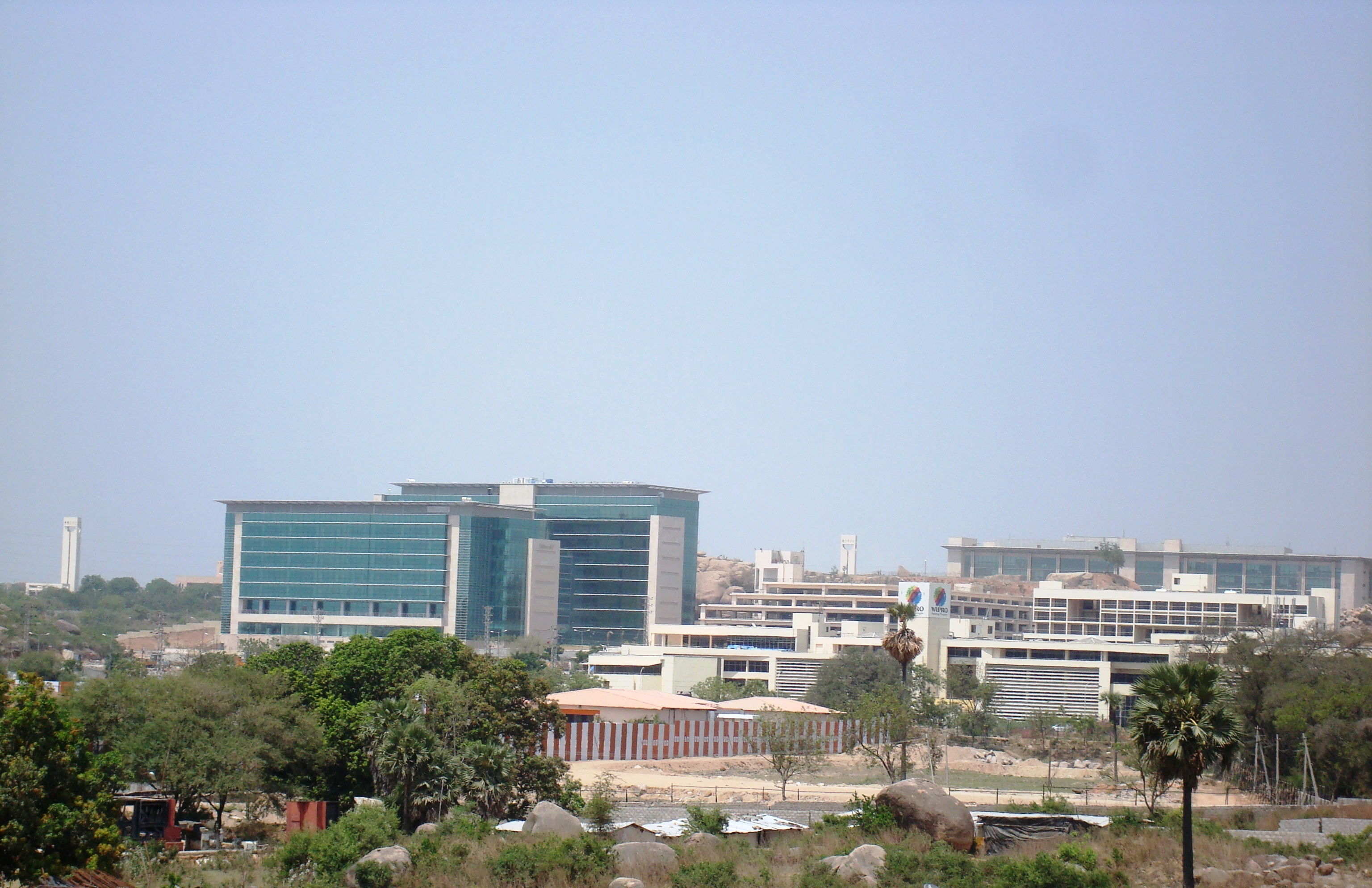
Gachibowli; a suburb of Hyderabad.

To the North of central Hyderabad lies the Hussain Sagar Lake, along with Tank Bund Road, Rani Gunj and Secunderabad Railway Station. Most of the parks, boating and recreation locations are situated around the Hussain Sagar Lake such as; Public Garden, Birla planetarium, Necklace Road, Sanjeevaiah Park, Indira Park, Lumbini Park, NTR Gardens, IMAX theaters, Snow World, Buddha purnima and Tankbund Park.

The Western and South western areas had grown rapidly in the recent decade and houses, HITEC City, Genome Valley, Hyderabad Airport, ICRISAT, Toli chowki, Mehdi patnam, Gachibowli, Golconda Fort, Qutb Shahi Tombs, Osman sagar, Himayath sagar, Miyapur, Madhapur and Jubilee Hills, KBR National Park and Film Nagar. Many of the tallest buildings in Hyderabad are located in the western neighbourhoods. To the North-West houses most of the upper class residential areas such as Banjara Hills, Jubilee Hills, Raj Bhavan, Somajiguda, Begumpet and Khairatabad. The extreme North end houses industrial areas such as Sanathnagar, Moosapet, Balanagar, Pathan Cheru, BHEL township and Chanda Nagar which have the residential areas such as Kukatpally, Lingampally and Nizampet.

A major upcoming development in the south of Hyderabad is The Hyderabad Future City, also known as Bharat Future City, also known as the Fourth City, a 30,000-acre Net-Zero smart city being developed by the Telangana government in the south of the city. The state government appointed DP Architects, a Singapore-based consultancy firm, to prepare the Future City masterplan for Future City Development Authority (FCDA) - while inaugurating the FCDA office building and its website and new logo at Bharat Future City on 10 June 2026.

The FCDA Master Plan 2047 establishes a 15-minute walkable city integrating AI corridors, data hubs, foreign universities, elite sports academies, World Trade Center, etc. and green manufacturing clusters. The government has locked a June 2026 groundbreaking deadline for major industrial units, backed by central support for the 122.9-km Metro Rail Phase 2 link.

To the east of the city lies the Ramoji Film City, and most of the settlements here were developed since after 1969 by the migrants of the Telugu people; which houses areas such as Dilsukhnagar, Kothapet, Vanasthalipuram, LB Nagar, Hayath nagar, Ibrahim patnam and most of the defence Research centers are located in the east of the Hyderabad.

The North eastern part of the city houses residential colonies particularly for Retired military personnel and Central Government Employees due to the presence of several national institutions like ECIL, NFC, Indian Institute of Chemical Technology, NGRI and NIN. Neighbourhoods include Malkajgiri, Sainikpuri, Neredmet, A. S. Rao Nagar, Tarnaka, Osmania University, Habsiguda, Marredpally, Bowenpally, Trimulgherry, Secunderabad Cantonment and Uppal.

The three Industrial districts of the city are located in Chandulal Bhardari (South), Sanathnagar (Northwest) and Azamabad (North). Industrial Suburbs of Hyderabad are; Ghatkesar, Hayathnagar, Dundigal, Shamirpet, Shamshabad and Narsingi. The city has warehousing facilities at Musheerabad (North), Kachiguda (Central) and Sanathnagar (North). Important vegetable and fruit markets are located at Monda Market, Madannapet, Jambagh flower market, Bharat Nagar, Mir Alam mandi, Gaddiannaram and Gudimalkapur. Raitu Bazar located in the different parts of the city core are the small scale vegetable markets controlled by the GHMC. Fish Markets are located in Secunderabad, Begum bazaar, Puranapul, Mangalghat and M.J.Market. The city have five slaughter houses located in Ziaguda, Gowlipura, Ramnasthpura, Amberpet and Bhoiguda. A modern abattoir at Chengicherla in the suburb of the city.

== Climate ==
Hyderabad Period: 1951–2000

Climate chart (precipitation, max. and min. temperature)
J	F	M	A	M	J	J	A	S	O	N	D
13 29 15	7.9 32 18	15 35 21	20 38 24	36 39 26	104 35 24	170 31 23	179 30 22	158 31 22	97 31 20	22 29 17	5.9 28 15
- █ Average max. and min. temperatures in °C
- █ Precipitation totals in mm
- Source: IMD
Imperial conversion
J	F	M	A	M	J	J	A	S	O	N	D
0.5 84 59	0.3 89 64	0.6 96 69	0.8 100 76	1.4 102 79	4.1 94 75	6.7 87 73	7 86 72	6.2 87 72	3.8 87 69	0.9 84 62	0.2 82 58
- █ Average max. and min. temperatures in °F
- █ Precipitation totals in inches

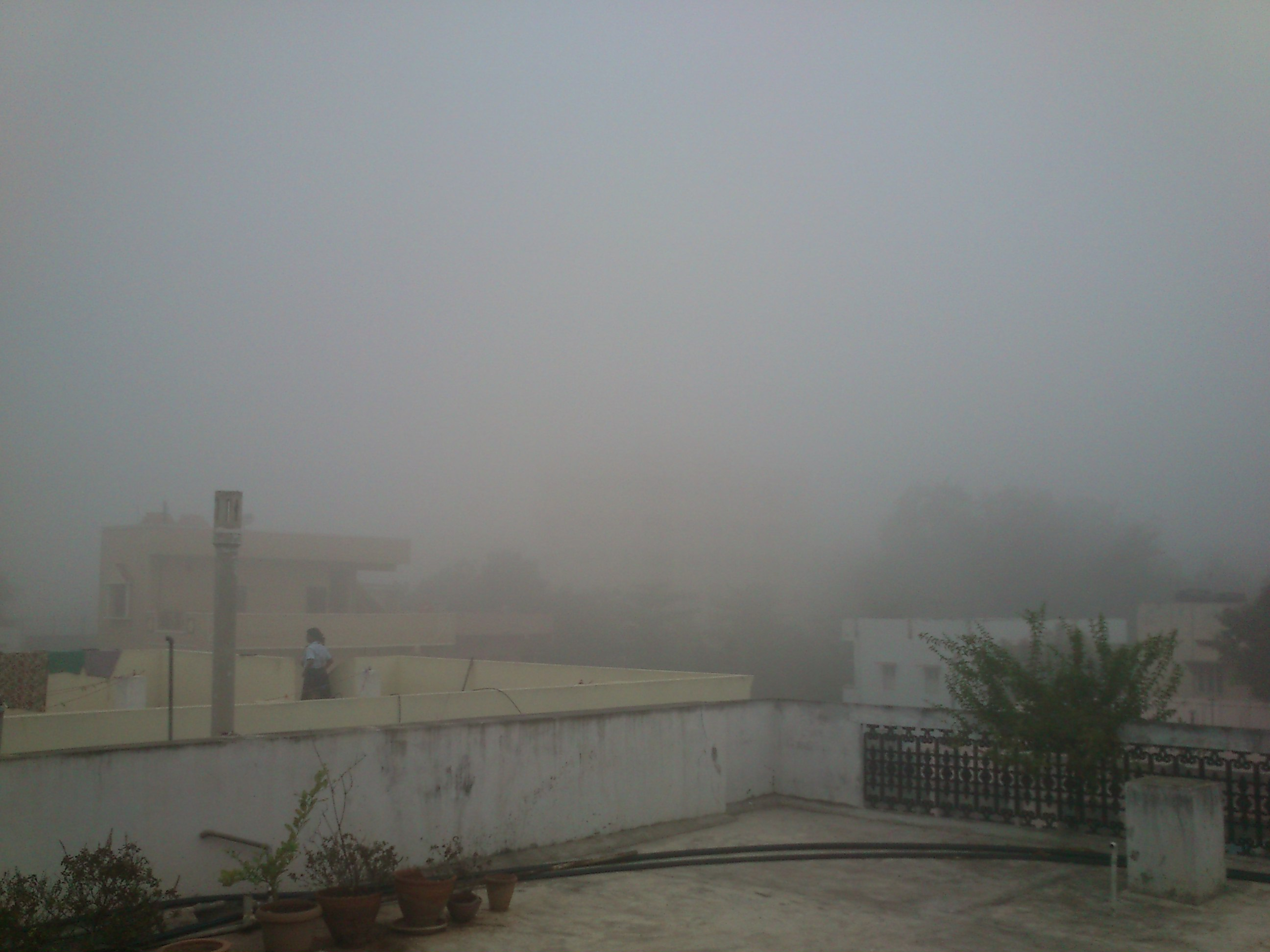
A foggy day in Hyderabad

Hyderabad has a unique combination of a tropical wet and dry climate that borders on a hot semi-arid climate (Köppen climate classification BSh).

The climate of Hyderabad remains fairly warm through most parts of the year and does not receive much rainfall in the monsoon. With the onset of winters in North and central parts of India, temperatures marginally come down in the months of December and January and the nights become quite cool in and around the Hyderabad city. During the summer months, the mercury goes as high as 42 °C while in winters the minimum temperature may come down to as low as 12 °C. June to November are the months of monsoons, accompanied by rains. During the Monsoons also the temperature goes down at times. Thus, for most parts of the year the weather and climate of Hyderabad remains fairly moderate and you can visit the Hyderabad city anytime in the year but the best season to visit Hyderabad is between October–February.

Hot steppe type climate prevails over Hyderabad. Telangana district in which Hyderabad is situated is the hottest part of the State during summer and coldest in winter. The mean daily temperature varies from 30 °C to 36 °C from April to June and from 20 °C to 24 °C in the months of December and January.

The mean maximum temperature ranges between 39 °C and 43 °C in May. After the withdrawal of the monsoon, the maximum temperature rises slightly due to increased insulation.

The mean minimum temperature is 13 °C to 17 °C in December and January, but it rises to 26 °C to 29 °C in May. The minimum temperature falls rapidly after October, and less than 10 °C was recorded on individual days.

The climate is pleasant from November to February. The summer months of April and May are uncomfortable due to oppressive heat. The period from July to September is warm, humid and uncomfortable

Rainfall

More than 75 per cent of the rainfall is received during the south-west monsoon season, i.e., from June to September, July being the month when it rains. September is the month, when there are rains. The south-west monsoon sets in by 7 June. Its advent is sudden and the rainfall increases from less than 5 per cent (of the annual) in May to 15 per cent in June.

Humidity

Humidity during the monsoon season is very high exceeding 75% from July to September. In the dry months of March, April and May, humidity is comparatively low with an average of 25 to 30%.

Cloudiness

June to October is the period when more than half of the sky is covered with clouds, while only about a quarter of the sky is clouded from January to March. Half of the days in July and August have overcast skies. About 10 to 13 days in the months of January, February and March, the skies are free from clouds in clear weather.

Recent Temperature Increases

According to India Meteorological Department, the summer months of April and May 2009 recorded the warmest temperatures since 1901, with mean maximum temperatures hovering frequently at around 42 °C with maximum temperature touching 45 °C.

Climate data for Hyderabad (1991–2020 normals, extremes 1951–2020)
Month	Jan	Feb	Mar	Apr	May	Jun	Jul	Aug	Sep	Oct	Nov	Dec	Year
Record high °C (°F)	35.9 (96.6)	39.1 (102.4)	42.2 (108.0)	43.3 (109.9)	44.5 (112.1)	45.5 (113.9)	38.0 (100.4)	37.6 (99.7)	36.5 (97.7)	36.7 (98.1)	34.0 (93.2)	35.0 (95.0)	45.5 (113.9)
Mean daily maximum °C (°F)	28.6 (83.5)	31.8 (89.2)	35.2 (95.4)	37.6 (99.7)	38.8 (101.8)	34.4 (93.9)	30.5 (86.9)	29.6 (85.3)	30.1 (86.2)	30.4 (86.7)	28.8 (83.8)	27.8 (82.0)	32.0 (89.5)
Daily mean °C (°F)	22.8 (73.0)	25.4 (77.7)	28.8 (83.8)	31.4 (88.5)	33.2 (91.8)	29.7 (85.5)	27.2 (81.0)	26.4 (79.5)	26.8 (80.2)	26.2 (79.2)	24.1 (75.4)	22.2 (72.0)	27.0 (80.6)
Mean daily minimum °C (°F)	13.9 (57.0)	15.5 (59.9)	20.3 (68.5)	24.1 (75.4)	26.0 (78.8)	23.9 (75.0)	22.5 (72.5)	22.0 (71.6)	21.7 (71.1)	20.0 (68.0)	16.4 (61.5)	13.1 (55.6)	20.0 (67.9)
Record low °C (°F)	6.1 (43.0)	8.9 (48.0)	13.2 (55.8)	16.0 (60.8)	16.7 (62.1)	17.8 (64.0)	18.6 (65.5)	18.7 (65.7)	17.8 (64.0)	11.7 (53.1)	7.4 (45.3)	7.1 (44.8)	6.1 (43.0)
Average rainfall mm (inches)	9.2 (0.36)	10.2 (0.40)	12.3 (0.48)	27.2 (1.07)	34.5 (1.36)	113.8 (4.48)	162.0 (6.38)	203.9 (8.03)	148.5 (5.85)	113.9 (4.48)	19.1 (0.75)	5.0 (0.20)	859.6 (33.84)
Average precipitation days (≥ 0.3 mm)	1.1	1	1.4	3.7	4.2	10.9	15.4	16.3	12.3	7.6	2.5	0.5	76.9
Average rainy days	0.6	0.6	0.9	2.0	2.5	6.8	9.5	11.3	8.4	5.6	1.3	0.3	49.8
Average relative humidity (%) (at 17:30 IST)	41	33	29	30	31	52	65	70	67	59	49	44	48
Average dew point °C (°F)	12 (54)	12 (54)	13 (55)	15 (59)	15 (59)	19 (66)	20 (68)	20 (68)	20 (68)	17 (63)	15 (59)	13 (55)	16 (61)
Mean monthly sunshine hours	272.8	265.6	272.8	276.0	279.0	180.0	136.4	133.3	162.0	226.3	243.0	251.1	2,698.3
Mean daily sunshine hours	8.8	9.4	8.8	9.2	9.0	6.0	4.4	4.3	5.4	7.3	8.1	8.1	7.4
Average ultraviolet index	9	11	12	12	12	12	12	12	12	11	9	8	11
Source 1: India Meteorological Department (sun 1971–2000) Time and Date (dewpoints, 2005–2015)
Source 2: Tokyo Climate Center (mean temperatures 1991–2020) Weather Atlas

== See also ==
- Hyderabad
- History of Hyderabad
- List of neighbourhoods in Hyderabad
- List of tourist attractions in Hyderabad
- Culture of Hyderabad
- Hyderabadi cuisine
- Economy of Hyderabad
