= Tree Day =

Tree Day was started in the Indian city of Hyderabad on 15 May 2016 to protest against the government's plans to cut down thousands of trees around the KBR National Park. The Government of Telangana had proposed a Strategic Road Development Plan (SRDP) under which the entire KBR Park periphery also called the KBR Park Eco-Sensitive Zone would be affected. This would lead to a significant impact on the flora and fauna of the park that houses more than 600 species of plants, hundreds of species of animals and birds. Tree Day was organised by a group called Hyderabad Rising, a group of non-partisan, non-political nature lovers who came together for a small protest rally in the last week of April. This gradually started taking shape as a movement, with hundreds to thousands of residents of Hyderabad joining.

Tree Day, a term inspired by Mothers' Day, Teachers' Day and Fathers' Day, was coined by Hyderabad Rising. It was organised with the objective of bonding with the trees by hugging them, watering them, tying the sacred Indian thread on them and taking selfies with them. The event had participation by runners, walkers, yoga enthusiasts, tree lovers, nature lovers, environmental conservationists, city planners and transport consultants, all of whom have questioned the government's move to cut down so many trees for road widening and flyovers, when planners such as Peter J. Park have asserted that flyovers do not solve traffic problems. The participants urged the government to adopt sustainable development policies.

The environmentalist Professor Purushottam Reddy noted, "The people of Hyderabad have set a precedent and made history by standing up for the trees in the city and have also introduced a 'Tree Day', which people across the country can now celebrate every year."
