= Gannaram =

- village
- Location in Telangana, India Gannaram (India)
- Coordinates: 18°31′39″N 78°14′42″E
- Country: India
- State: Telangana
- Region: Deccan Plateau
- District: Nizamabad
- Talukas: indalwai

Government
  - Member of the Legislative Assembly MLA: Bajireddy Goverdhan TSRTC Chairman
  - Mandala Praja Parishad - Indalwai: President: Badavath Ramesh Nayak
  - Mandala Praja Parishad - Indalwai: Vice President: Busani Anjaiah
  - Sarpanch: K.Mohan Reddy

Area
  - Total: 20 km^{2} (7.7 sq mi)
- Elevation: 385 m (1,263 ft)

Population
  - Total: 9,250
  - Rank: 1
  - Density: 460/km^{2} (1,200/sq mi)

Languages
  - Official: Telugu
- Time zone: UTC+5:30 (IST)
- PIN: 503164
- Telephone code: 91-8461
- Vehicle registration: TG 16
- Literacy: 75%
- constituency: Nizamabad
- Vidhan Sabha constituency: Nizamabad Rural
- Avg. annual temperature: 32 °C (90 °F)
- Avg. summer temperature: 40 °C (104 °F)
- Avg. winter temperature: 20 °C (68 °F)
- Website: @greatergannaram

Gannaram is a village which is 150 km from Hyderabad. It is located in indalwai mandal, under the constituency of Nizamabad Rural of Nizamabad district, Telangana in south India.

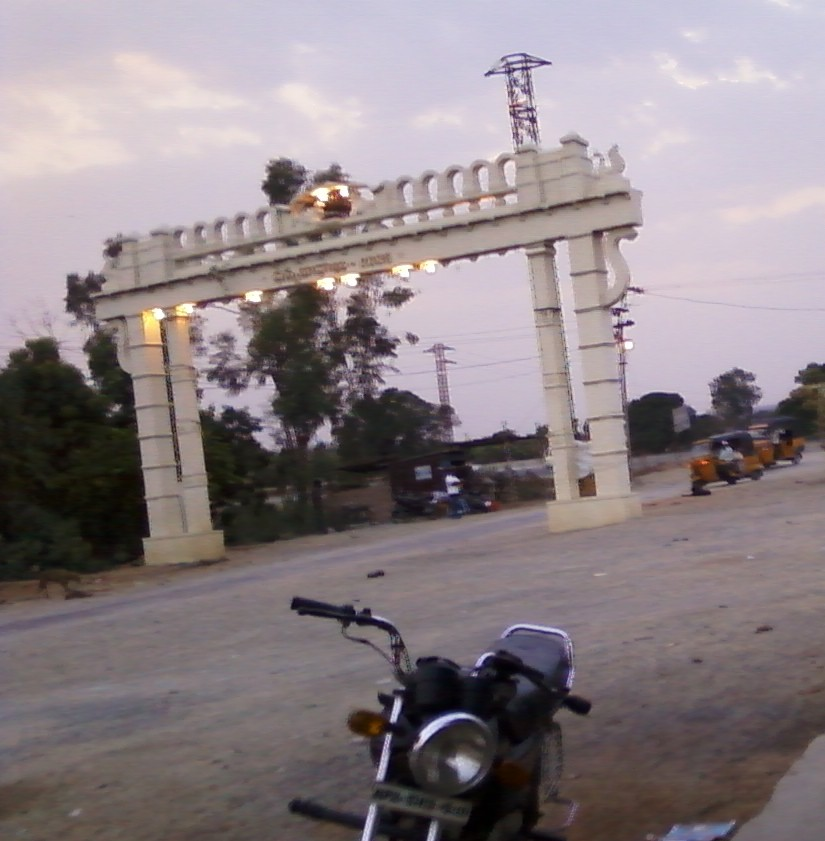
Welcome board of Gannaram

It has a population of more than 9250. It is well connected by National Highway 44 and number of buses plying from Nizamabad to Kamareddy. It is a religiously diversified Major village with Hindu Temples and Mosques. This village is famous for temples of Lord Shiva, Hanuman and Peddamma. Every year sree durga devi navrathri vutsawalu, is conducted by lalithadevi yuvajana sangam and village development committee"VDC"Kalyanothsavam is held in Village for Sri RamaNavami in April and special pujas held for Lord Shiva on the day of Shivarathri. Ugadi & Dusshera two are the major festivals celebrated in this village.

Agriculture is the main income source. People depend mostly on ground water. Major crops are Paddy, Chillies, Sunflower, Maize, Turmeric, Soyabeans, Sugarcane.

The major political parties are TRS Other

First sarpanch of the village Aarugonda Narsimloo ( 20 yrs), he started drainage system in the village and constructed shiva temple and roads of the village and arranged electricity for this village.

At the entrance of the village there is a Lord Shiva temple, at the end too there is a Shiva Temple on the Hill. This Shiva temple is constructed by Arugonda Narsimloo. The population of this village is nearly 9,250 and the total area of the village in about 20 km² including agricultural lands. Indalwai, Paty thanda, Nallavelli, Sirnapalli, and Chandrayan pally are the other surrounding villages to this village.

In the village there is 2 banks one is the branch of Andhra bank Indalwai and the other one is Telangana Grameena Bank started in 2017.

== History ==
Estimated at approximately 600 years old, this village is home to the ancient temple of Lord Shiva, though the actual date of the temple was constructed is unknown. Typical homes in the village range from 100 – 200 years old.

== Education ==
The village has a 75% literature rate and there is one government school for primary and secondary education. Most of the students studied B.Tech. and other degrees in Hyderabad and Nizamabad.

== Transport ==
The village is located 28 km from Nizamabad. The nearest towns to this village are Nizamabad, Kamareddy (32 km), Hyderabad (152 km) and Shamshabad International Airport is the nearest airport located in Hyderabad and Nizamabad has the nearest railway station. Three Bus service from Nizamabad to Nallavelli & Sirnapally APSRTC passes through the village and there are also automobiles that travel from Indalwai, a nearby village, with access to National Highway 7 (India)(New NH 44) and bus service between Hyderabad, Nizamabad, Adilabad, Nirmal and Armoor.

== Culture ==
Maha Shivaratri festival is celebrated very grandly also celebrating other hindu and islam festivals including village festivals. Also people belongs to different casts are living in this village. Main religion followed in village is hinduism with 95% of people, Christianity 2% and islam 3%. All the people belonging to different communities are living unitedly. This village is famous in district in the field of games like cricket and kabaddi.

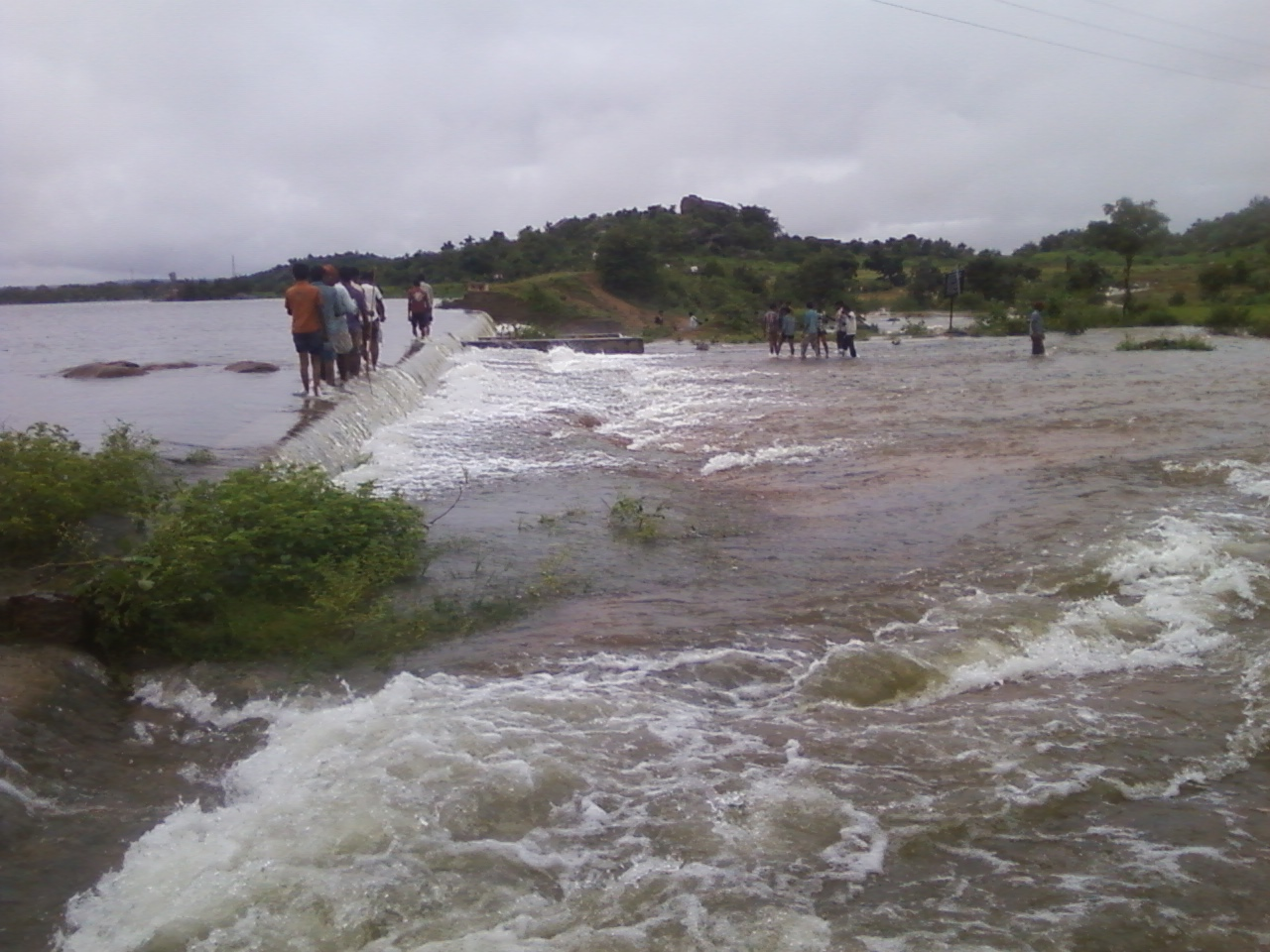
facing floods

== Agriculture ==
Most of the people living in this village are farmers, mainly they cultivate Rice, Turmeric(pasupu), Sweetcorn(mokka jonna), Pearl millet(sajja) soya bean, green chillies and ground nut. The water resources for cultivation are bore wells.

== NRIs Status ==
Most of the people are staying abroad like Dubai, Saudi Arabia, Muscat, Kuwait, Bahrain, Malaysia, Iraq, Afghanistan, South Africa, America and Australia for better opportunities.
