= Eidgah, Madannapet =

Old Eidgah, Madannapet is a two-minaret Eidgah (open-air mosque) located at Madannapet in Hyderabad, Telangana, India. It was built during Qutub Shahi rule in 16th century. The mosque's two huge minarets reflect magnificence. Only Eid prayers (Eid Ul Fitr and Eid Ul Azha are offered here) and Uras of Dargah Hazrath Imaam Ali Shah Qadri R.A is organized once a year by the Mutawalli of Eidgah and Dargah. Old Eidgah, Madannapet is an archeologically protected monument.

Qutub Shahi Period: The Eidgah dates back to the Qutub Shahi period, specifically the reign of Sultan Mohammed Qutb Shah (1612-1626).

Architectural Style: It showcases the Qutub Shahi architectural style, with two large granite minarets decorated with ornate carvings and a structure built with stone and lime.

Location: The Eidgah is located in Madannapet, a part of Saidabad, and is situated in isolation among concrete structures.

INTACH Heritage Award: The Idgah has been recognized by the Indian National Trust for Art and Cultural Heritage (INTACH) and was awarded an INTACH Heritage Award in 2011.

Function: Only Eid prayers are offered here two times a year and uras of Dargah Hazrath Imaam Ali Shah Qadri R.A.

Recent Eidgah: Another Eidgah, built on the banks of the Mir Alam tank, became more prominent, and the Madannapet Eidgah came to be known as the "Old Eidgah".

Description: The Old Eidgah has a five-bay prayer hall surmounted by a line of lobed arches and a prominent parapet. The façade is framed by massive minarets of stunted proportions with intermediate twelve-sided arcaded galleries.
