= Snow World =

Amusement park

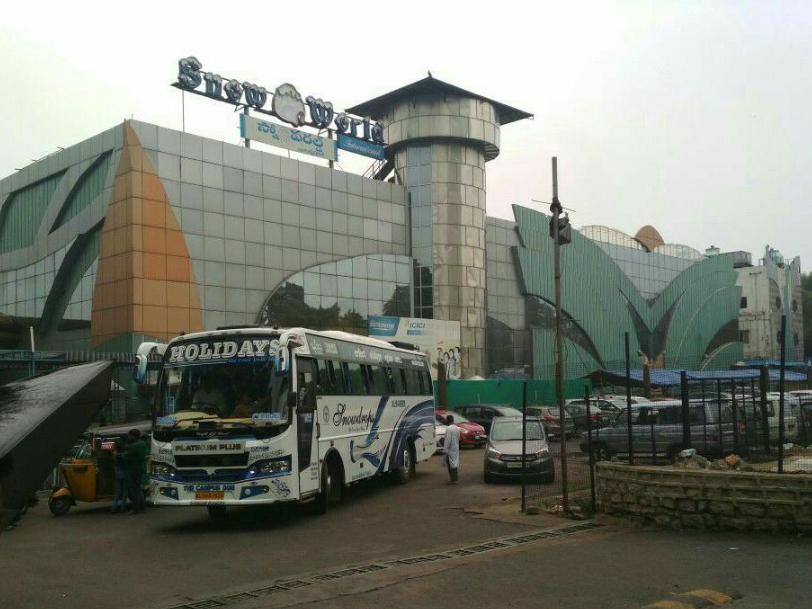
- Interactive map of Snow World
- Location: Lower Tank Bund Road, Hyderabad, Telangana, India
- Coordinates: 17°30′54″N 78°28′51″E
- Opened: 28 January 2004
- Owner: Ocean Park Multitech Ltd.
- Operating season: All year
- Area: 2 acres (0.81 ha)

Snow World is an amusement park located in Hyderabad, Telangana, India within an area of about 2 acres (0.81 ha). Located beside Indira Park and along the Hussain Sagar lake, the park was inaugurated on 28 January 2004.

== Background ==
Ocean Park Multitech Ltd. took the 2 acres (0.81 ha) plot on a 33-year lease from the Government of Andhra Pradesh at the rate of ₹3.6 million (US$38,000) per year. The lease amount was to go up by 5% every year. Constructed at a cost of ₹20 million (US$210,000), the 17,000 square feet (1,600 m^{2}) facility was designed by Nitish Roy, a well-known Indian art director, production designer and architect. The facility, which was built in collaboration with the local tourism department, is India's first and the biggest in the world and was only the third such snow park after the ones in Malaysia and Singapore.

On 28 January 2004, the then Chief Minister of Andhra Pradesh Chandrababu Naidu inaugurated the facility. Though it was not intended to be open for visitors on that day, some of them ventured into the facility. They experienced giddiness from inhaling excess nitrogen in the air, which is used to produce snow. Some of them also got swollen hands, feet and faces due to the snow and air

== Facilities ==
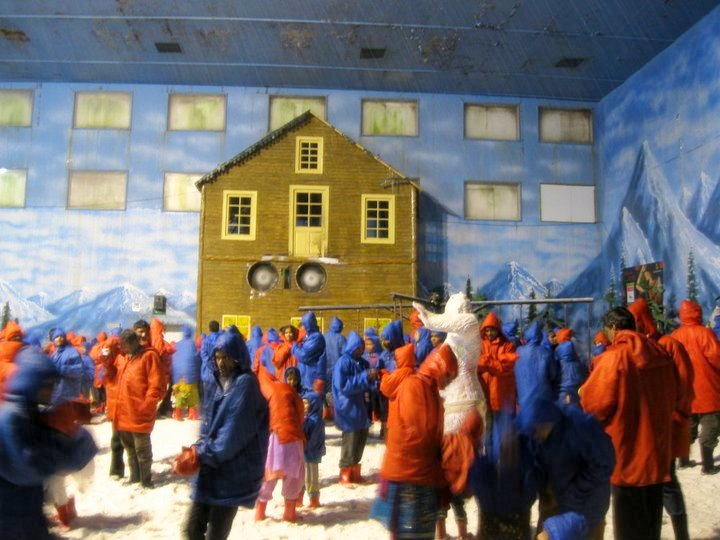
Visitors at the Snow World

A gigantic 200 tonnes of artificial snow was laid on the layered flooring which was specially prepared to avoid seepage or melting. Every day, the top layer of snow is cleaned and an additional two to three tonnes of snow, which is generated within the facility, is used to top the snow spread. The artificial snow is made using a patented technology from Australia. The snow is made from water that is filtered four times so it won't harm children if they consume it, as they are prone to in other such locations.

The park can accommodate a total of 2,400 visitors in a day. Every visitor gets acclimatised to lower temperatures in a step-wise manner, 20 °C (68 °F), then 0 °C, and then a sub zero temperature. This method is approved internationally. In addition, visitors are given protective clothing like extra-warm sweaters and jackets and snow caps and a steaming cup of soupy broth for consumption to help them acclimatise to the rapidly but gradual temperature change. The internal area, also called as the Cryo Zone, maintains a constant temperature of – 5 °C. For 1 hour, a maximum of 300 visitors at a time can explore the different facilities such as kids snow play area, snow wars, snow tube slide, sleigh slide, ice-bumping cars, merry-go-round and an ice skating rink.

A few months after its inauguration, a snowfall feature was added. Said to be the first of its kind at any show theme park or snow dome in India, the visitors are exposed to snowfall for five minutes just before a session ends. A 40,000 square feet (3,700 m^{2}) kart racing, built at a cost of ₹25 million (US$260,000), was open to public. 300 workers took one year to construct the thematic indoor go karting arena. The indoor resemble a cave that was uniquely designed using plaster of paris. With an exhaust system and a fresh air system to ensure uninterrupted supply of fresh air, the facility sought certification from the Motor Sports Association of India.
