= Azamabad Industrial Estate =

Industrial estate in Hyderabad, India

Azamabad Industrial Estate is an Industrial estate located in Hyderabad, India. It is located in Azamabad.

Many historic companies are located which include cigarette manufacturer VST Industries & Edible Oil manufacturers Agarwal Industries Private Limited set up in the 1940s.

A power plant, Azamabad Thermal Power Estate was operationalized in 1956.

Azamabad Industrial Estate was built during the time of the Nizam.
