= Jubilee Hills Check Post metro station =

Metro station in Hyderabad, India

Apollo Hospitals Jubilee Hills Check Post
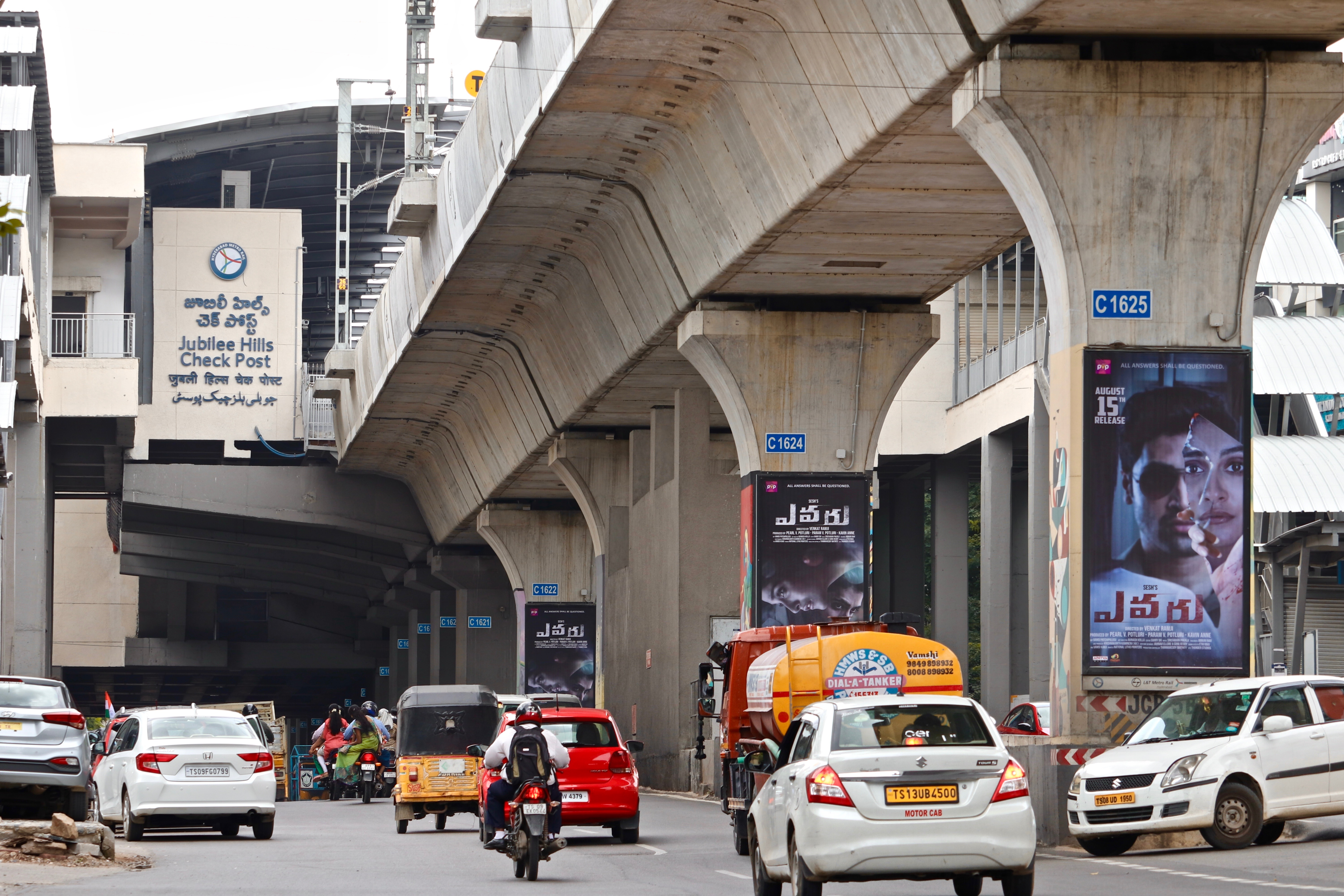

General information
- Location: Rd Number 36, Jawahar Colony, Jubilee Hills, Hyderabad, Telangana - 500033
- Coordinates: 17.416471°N 78.438247°E
- System: Hyderabad Metro station
- Line: Blue Line
- Tracks: 2

Construction
- Structure type: Elevated
- Depth: 7.07 m (23.2 ft)
- Platform levels: 2

History
- Opened: 18 May 2019; 7 years ago

Services
Preceding station	Hyderabad Metro	Following station
Peddamma Gudi towards Raidurg	Blue Line	Road No 5 Jubilee Hills towards Nagole
Location

Jubilee Hills Check Post (also known as Apollo Hospitals Jubilee Hills Check Post) is a metro station located on the Blue Line of the Hyderabad Metro, in India. It was the 50th metro station to be operationalised.

== History ==
It was opened on 18 May 2019.

== Facilities ==
It is a single-deck metro station with no concourse due to a peculiar land profile, which means passengers entering the station directly go to the platform deck. This metro station serves commuters from and to Film Nagar, Journalists Colony, Nandagiri Hills, Taraka Rama Nagar, Deen Dayal Nagar, Gayatri Hills and other colonies around Jubilee Hills Check Post and KBR Park and other areas of Banjara Hills. Jubilee Hills Check Post is the highest metro station in Hyderabad.
