= Madannapet =

Coordinates: 17°58′N 79°53′E

- Neighbourhood
- Interactive map of Madannapet
- Country: India
- State: Telangana
- District: Hyderabad
- Metro: Hyderabad

Government
  - Body: GHMC

Languages
  - Official: Telugu, Urdu
- Time zone: UTC+5:30 (IST)
- PIN: 500059
- Vehicle registration: TS
- Lok Sabha constituency: Hyderabad
- Vidhan Sabha constituency: Yakutpura
- Planning agency: GHMC

Madannapet is a locality in Hyderabad, Telangana, India.

== Commercial area ==
There are many shops and a big vegetable market called Madannapet mandi, which is quite popular among people of surrounding suburbs.

A popular fish market situated near the vegetable market attracts people looking to buy fresh fish and seafood. It is particularly crowded on Sundays.

An old Eidgah (recognized by TS Wakf Board) is in this area.

== Transport ==
TSRTC connects Madannapet with all parts of the city.

The closest MMTS Train station is at Yakutpura.
