= Chengicherla Abattoir =

Slaughterhouse in Telangana, India

Chengicherla Abattoir is a slaughterhouse located in Chengicherla village near Hyderabad, TS, India. It is located 30 kilometers away from Hyderabad. The communities that are involved are Aare Katikas and Qureshis.

== History ==
Chengicherla Abattoir was opened on 1 January 2004 after a high court verdict.

== Infrastructure ==
Chengicherla Abattoir was built at a cost of ₹330 million (US$3.9 million) over 83-acre site, was to become the alternative source for meat and beef for city residents.

The Abattoir has a capacity to slaughter 5,000 sheep and goat, and 4,000 large animals (beef) in each shift. They are working four shifts in a day.
