= Challagalla Narasimham =

Indian civil servant and author

Challagalla Narasimhan
- Born: Andhra Pradesh, India
- Occupation: Civil servant
- Awards: Padma Shri

Challagalla Narasimham was an Indian civil servant and author, known for his contributions for the modernization of Jubilee Hills area in Greater Hyderabad in the Indian state of Andhra Pradesh He was a former Indian Administrative Service officer and Commissioner of Chennai Corporation from 1947 to 1953 who developed several townships in Chennai, in Tamil Nadu. The story of his life has been documented in his autobiography, Me and My Times, published in 1986. The Government of India honoured him in 1962, with the award of Padma Shri, the fourth highest Indian civilian award for his services to the nation.

== See also ==
- Jubilee Hills
