= Gudimalkapur =

- neighbourhood
- Panorama of Gudimalkapur flower market

- Location in Telangana, India Gudimalkapur (Telangana) Gudimalkapur (India)
- Coordinates: 17°22′47″N 78°26′09″E
- Country: India
- State: Telangana
- District: Hyderabad
- Metro: Hyderabad

Government
  - Body: GHMC

Languages
  - Official: Telugu
- Time zone: UTC+5:30 (IST)
- PIN: 500 028
- Vehicle registration: TG
- Lok Sabha constituency: Hyderabad
- Vidhan Sabha constituency: Nampally
- Planning agency: GHMC
- Website: telangana.gov.in

Gudimalkapur is a major suburban neighbourhood of Hyderabad, India. It is one of the oldest parts of the city, 2 km from Mehdipatnam, another famous suburb. The area has a small-town environment, as it has seen very little development being an interior location away from the mainstream city. It is very famous for the Gudimalkapur Vegetable Mandi and flower market. There is a very old huge Lord Venkateswara Temple called "Jhamsing Venkateswara Temple" just beside the market.

== Commercial area ==
There are many shops in this area catering to all budgets.

It is home to a big vegetable market called Gudimalkapur market, where the vegetable prices are very cheap. The flower market of the very famous Moazzam Jahi Market has been shifted to Gudimalkapur in 2009, making it a busy place every morning.

There are a chain of function halls located here which are very popular during weddings and parties season.

== Transport ==
Gudimalkapur has a TSRTC bus depot at Mehdipatnam. It is a hub of many buses bound to all parts of the city which is just beside the famous Amba Theater.

The closest MMTS Train station is at Nampally.

== Religious Places ==
=== Triambhakeshwar Temple ===
Also known as Sai Baba Temple, it attracts many devotees from various areas of Hyderabad. It is home for deities like Shiva Lingam, Sri Durga Devi, Sai Baba and Navagraha. All the festivals are celebrated with devotion and Bhakti. Special life-sized idols of deities portraying important incidents of Hindu Mythology are set up on festivals. To manage the devotees on occasions like Sri Rama Navami, Maha Shivaratri, Udagi, Dussera, which are very well celebrated here, special security and crowd management techniques are implemented.

=== Jhamsing Venkateshwara Temple ===
It is one famous and oldest temples in the city, located right next to the market. Deities here include, Lord Venkateshwara along with Padmavathi and Alamelu and Radha Krishna. It stands in the corner a half-acre open ground. The temple is surrounded by greenery in the small garden.

== Educational Institutions ==
There are many schools here catering to all economic classes of the society.

1. Lal Bahadur College

2. MNR School

3. Sri Chaintanya Jr College

4. Vivekananda High School

5. Many other day-care centers for kids.
