= Film Nagar =

Neighbourhood in Jubilee Hills, Hyderabad, Telangana, India

- neighbourhood
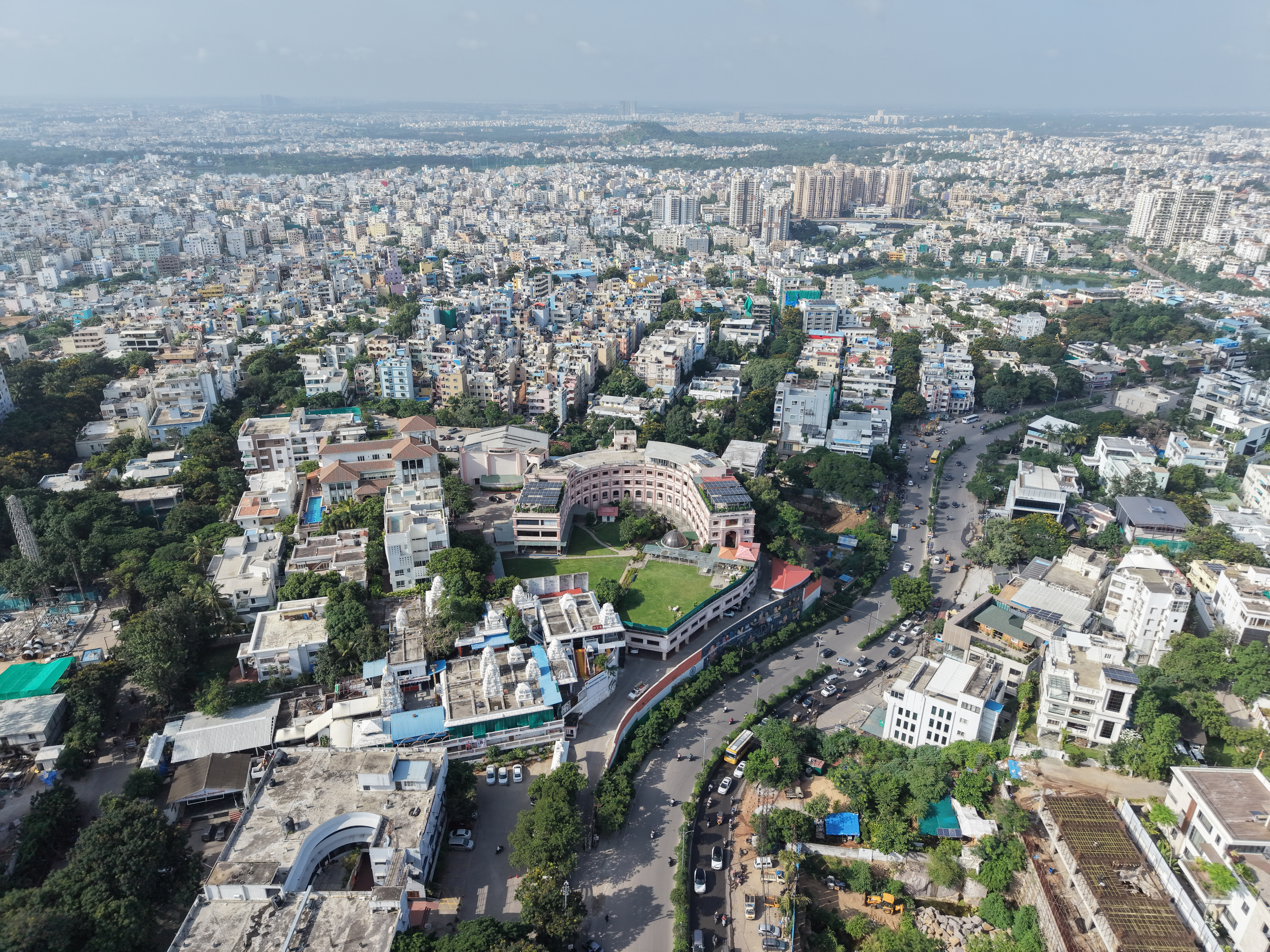
- Aerial view of Telugu Film Chamber

- Location in Telangana, India Film Nagar (Telangana) Film Nagar (India)
- Coordinates: 17°24′53″N 78°24′32″E
- Country: India
- State: Telangana
- Location: Hyderabad
- Named for: Film actors colony

Government
  - Type: TRS
  - Body: GHMC

Languages
  - Official: Telugu
- Time zone: IST
- Vehicle registration: TG 09
- Website: telangana.gov.in

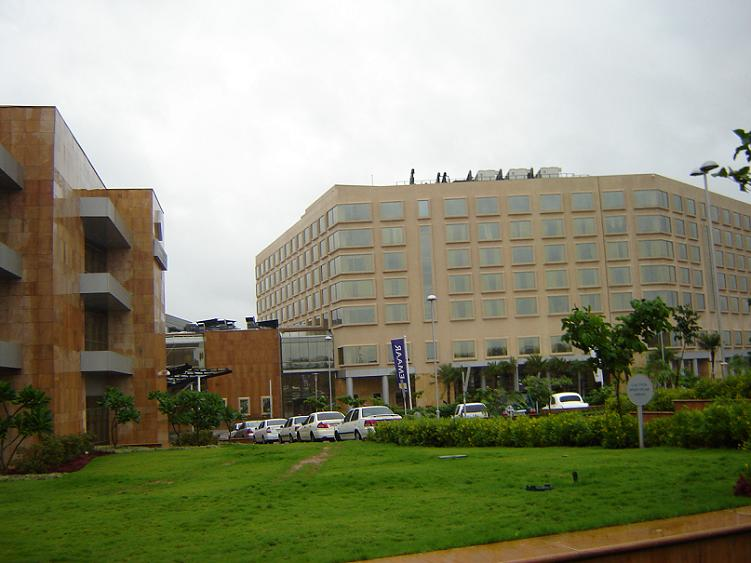
Hyderabad International Convention Centre in Madhapur, has been the Hyderabad home for Filmfare Awards South since 2007

Film Nagar, also known as Tinsel Town or Tollywood, is a neighbourhood in the western part of Hyderabad, Telangana, India. It is notable for its place as the home of the entertainment industry, including several of Telugu cinema's historic studios. The area is mostly a part of Jubilee Hills and also a small part of Banjara Hills. The area is the headquarters of Telugu film industry, and the residential hub of many Telugu film personalities such as Chiranjeevi, Daggubati Venkatesh, Allu Arjun, Nagarjuna, Junior NTR, Brahmaji, Mohan Babu and Balakrishna.

The area and the vicinity is home to some of the largest film production companies like Ramanaidu Studios, Annapurna Studios, Ramakrishna Studios, Padmalaya Studios, Sabdhalaya Theatres, Vaishno Academy, Vyjayanthi Movies, Sri Lakshmi Prasanna Pictures, Sri Venkateswara Creations, Fire Fly Creative Studios, and Makuta VFX. Shilpakala Vedika and Hyderabad International Convention Centre, home to the Filmfare Awards South ceremony, are located in the vicinity.

== Transport ==
TSRTC connects Film Nagar to other parts of Hyderabad. The closest MMTS Train station is at HITEC City and the closest Hyderabad Metro station is at Jubilee Hills Check Post metro station in Jubilee Hills.
