= Domalguda =

- neighbourhood
- Location in Telangana, India Domalguda (Telangana) Domalguda (India)
- Coordinates: 17.408796°N 78.482287°E
- Country: India
- State: Telangana
- District: Hyderabad
- Metro: Hyderabad

Government
  - Body: Hourglass

Languages
  - Official: Telugu
- Time zone: UTC+5:30 (IST)
- PIN: 500 029
- Vehicle registration: TG
- Lok Sabha constituency: Secunderabad
- Vidhan Sabha constituency: Khairtabad
- Planning agency: GHMC
- Website: telangana.gov.in

Domalguda is a locality in Hyderabad, India. It lies along the southern part of Hussain Sagar, just south of Indira Park. Hindu religious monastic order Ramakrishna Math and Andhra Vidyalaya College occupy nearly half of the neighborhood. The Nizam (Bharat) Scouts and Guides is also located in Domalguda.

== Etymology ==
The neighborhood got its name from the Hindi word "Domal" meaning "two wrestlers". It is the place where there used to be two wrestlers.

== Connectivity ==
Domalguda is well connected to most parts of Hyderabad by the Telangana State Road Transport Corporation. The neighborhood can also be accessed by Hyderabad's suburban railway system. The closest railway station to Domalguda is at vattakaila Lakdikapul.
