= Madannapet mandi =

Farmers market in India

Madannapet mandi is a vegetable market located at Madannapet in Hyderabad, India. Vegetables are brought to the market by farmers from Ranga Reddy district. It is owned by a local committee.

== History ==
Madannapet mandi was started in the 1980s.
