= Jubilee Hills =

- Neighbourhood
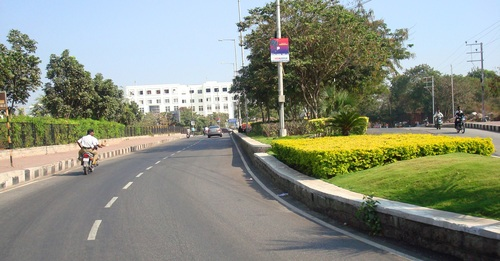
- Cancer foundation main road

- Location in Hyderabad, India Jubilee Hills (India)
- Coordinates: 17.416471°N 78.438247°E
- Country: India
- State: Telangana
- City: Hyderabad
- Metro: Jubilee Hills Check Post metro station

Government
  - Body: GHMC

Area
  - Total: 13.45 km^{2} (5.19 sq mi)

Population (2020)
  - Total: 148,869
  - Density: 11,070/km^{2} (28,670/sq mi)

Politics
  - MLA (Member of Legislative Assembly): Vacant
- Time zone: UTC+5:30 (IST)
- PIN: 500 033
- Vehicle registration: TG
- Lok Sabha constituency: Secunderabad
- Sasana Sabha constituency: Jubilee Hills
- Planning agency: HMDA
- Civic agency: GHMC
- Website: www.telangana.gov.in

Jubilee Hills is an affluent suburban neighbourhood in the western part of Hyderabad, Telangana. It is one of the most expensive commercial and residential locations in India with prime land prices fetching up to ₹360,000 per square metre (₹300,000/sq yd) [US$3,714.76/m^{2} or US$3,106.01/sq yd]. A 2.4-hectare (6-acre) tract of land in the city was sold for nearly ₹3.34 billion (equivalent to ₹12 billion or US$130 million in 2026) in 2005. Rental prices on Road Numbers 36 and 37 range from ₹1,100–₹2,200 per square metre (₹100–₹200/sq ft) [$11.2–$22.3/m^{2} or $1.04–$2.07/sq ft], among the top commercial rental locales in India.

This suburb is between the wealthy commercial district of Banjara Hills and is located within two kilometres of Hyderabad's IT hub of HITEC City.

To its southeast is the Kasu Brahmananda Reddy National Park, the erstwhile Chiran Palace, which is one of the largest urban national parks in India covering an area of 1.58 km^{2} (0.61 sq mi).

== History ==
The idea of Jubilee Hills came about in 1963. In 1967, IAS officer and Padma Shri award winner, Challagalla Narasimham was asked to become the President and "help proper development of the colony". He was thought to be the best person for office since he had planned and developed several colonies in Madras. At the time, Jubilee Hills was a hilly terrain without development. Challagalla's family happens to be the first family to have built and occupied the house in Jubilee Hills, making them the first residents. By 1980, 350 houses were built in the area which started the subsequent growth of the area. He had also cut down the trees to build his house and the others followed his example.

== Commercial area ==
Jubilee Hills is home to the Telugu film industry hub of Film Nagar, and some of its studios such as Ramanaidu Studios, Padmalaya Studios and Annapurna Studios are located here. It is also home to most of the Telugu movie industry's actors, business tycoons, and leading politicians.

Jubilee Hills is the political heart of Hyderabad as well as the state of Telangana. The Bharat Rashtra Samithi has recently built a headquarters here and the Telangana Ex-Chief Minister KCR resides here. Large scale political rallies are witnessed in the area occasionally.

=== Healthcare and education ===
The Indian Heart Association, an international non-profit organisation focused on expanding South Asian cardiac health awareness is headquartered in Jubilee Hills. Hamstech Institute of Fashion & Interior Design is located here.

The Apollo Hospital, Apollo Cancer institute, and other Apollo Subsidiaries located in Jubilee Hills Apart from hospitals in health care, Jubilee Hills has also surrounded with diagnostic centres.

Jubilee Hills has numerous schools including Bharatiya Vidya Bhavan, Jubilee Hills, P. Obul Reddy Public School, Jubilee Hills Public School, as well as Walden's Path, Sreenidhi, Oakridge, and Orchids Schools in the posh commercial Road Number 37. Dr. B. R. Ambedkar Open University is a distance education university of higher education that is also located here. The regional office of the Central Silk Board is in Prashasan Nagar locality in Jubilee Hills. The neighbourhood is a base to a number of small IT startups and BPOs.

=== Media ===
Jubilee Hills is home to large media houses like NTV, YuppTV, TV-9, TV5, T News, RMFT Rainbow Media, Mahaa TV, V6, CVR News, etc. It has become a media hub with a majority of the leading Telugu media houses headquartered here.

== Recreation ==
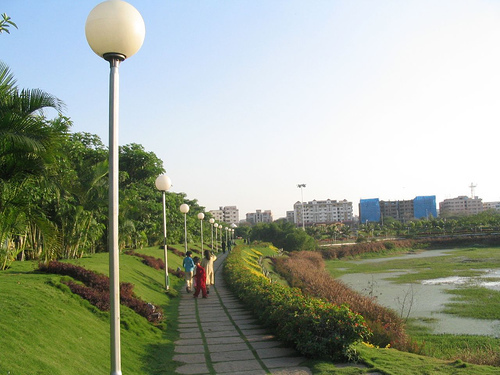
KBR Park

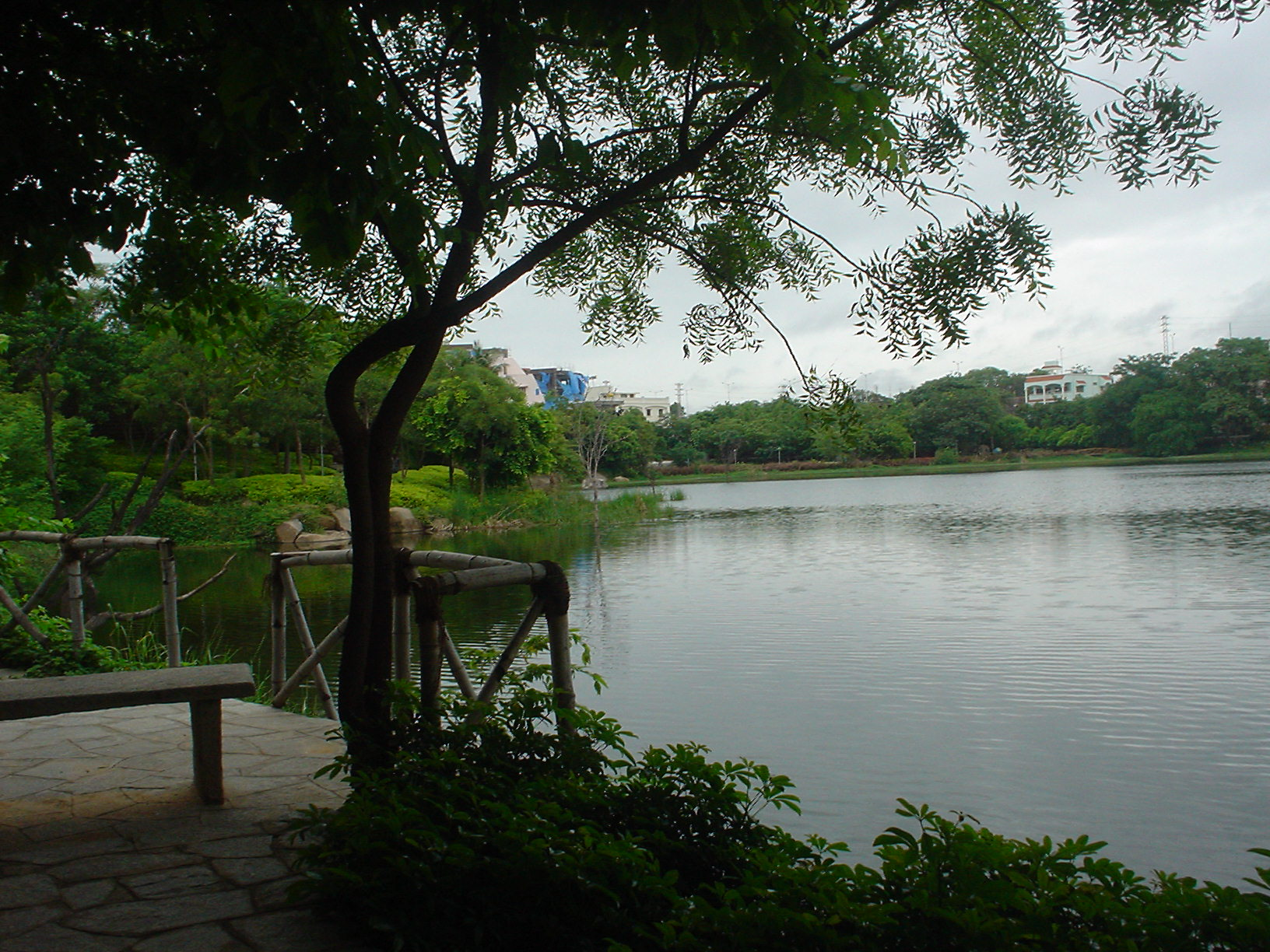
View of the Lotus Pond

The Kasu Brahmananda Reddy National Park and a man-made pond, Lotus Pond, are used by walkers and joggers. Also, there are two other significant natural water bodies in the area: Durgam Cheruvu and Hakimpet Kunta. The former is a major attraction to visitors where boating, trekking, restaurants, and an open-air disco operate. The State Gallery of Fine Arts is located to the northwest or in the region behind the business hub of Road Number 37.

Places for recreation in the region include the Jubilee Hills International Club, the Film Nagar Club, and the Hyderabad Gymkhana. The Jubilee Hills International Club (JHIC) is an exclusive membership only facility including outdoor Olympic-sized pools, indoor and outdoor restaurants, outdoor movie theatres, library, grand halls, playgrounds, fountains, badminton courts, squash courts, basketball courts, cricket courts, billiards hall, nature spaces, and grand lobby. The JHIC is home to the political and economic elites of Telangana . Nightlife in Jubilee Hills got enhanced by Dock 45, Fat Pigeon, Fusion 9, etc.

=== Places of Worship ===
The Sita Ramaswamy Temple, Jagannath Temple, Peddamma Temple and Jubilee Hills Mosque and Islamic Centre are the most popular in the area.

== Transport ==
TGRTC connects Jubilee Hills to the other parts of Hyderabad. The closest MMTS Train station is at HITEC City. State of the art Hyderabad Metro Rail blue line stations are at Road Number 5, Check Post, Peddamma Temple, and near the intersection of Road Numbers 36 and 37 towards Madhapur road. The Telangana government has also announced the building of a flyover connecting Madhapur to the Jubilee Hills Check Post. The flyover will come up at the backside of Road Numbers 36 and 37. With this addition, Jubilee Hills is set to be a central transport hub of Hyderabad.
