= Sri Peddamma Thalli Temple =

Building in India

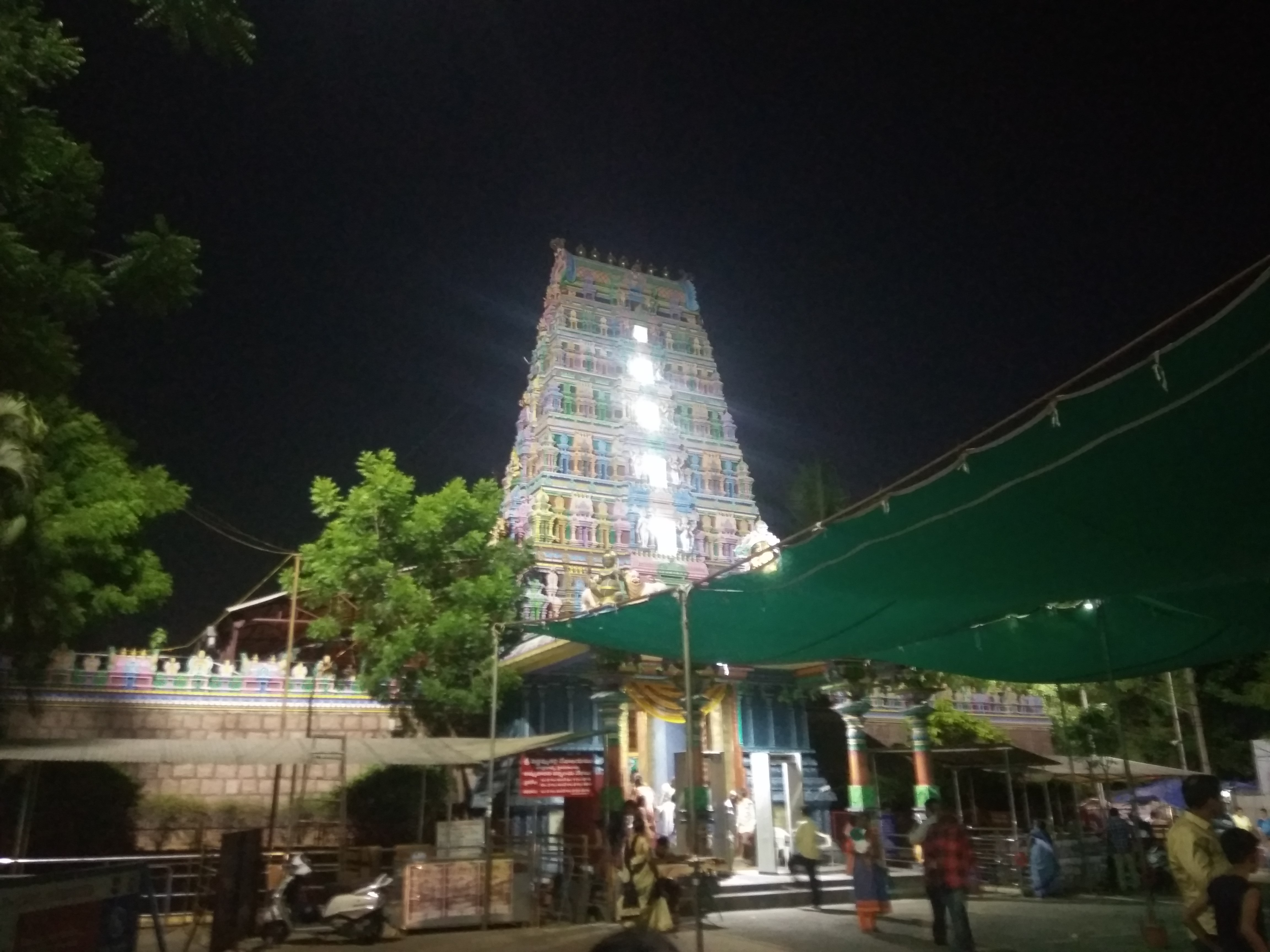
- Peddamma Temple

Religion
- Affiliation: Hinduism
- Deity: Shachi

Location
- Location: Jubilee Hills, Hyderabad
- State: Telangana
- Country: India
- Interactive map of Sri Peddamma Thalli Temple
- Coordinates: 17.430646°N 78.404990°E

Architecture
- Type: South Indian

Sri Peddamma Thalli Temple is a Hindu temple located at Jubilee Hills in Hyderabad, Telangana, India. It is very famous during the festive season of Bonaalu. The temple is dedicated to Peddamma, a village form of Vedic goddess Shachi.

== Location ==
This temple is located at Road no.55 of Jubilee Hills, Hyderabad, Telangana.

== Etymology ==
The word "Peddamma", which consists of two separate words, Pedda and Amma, literally means 'Mother of Mothers' or "The Supreme Mother". She is one of the 11 forms of Village Deities and is known as The Supreme most. She is associated with the Vedic goddess Sachi.

The two mega events of this goddess namely Mahotsavam and Rathotsavam will be celebrated in February. Other temples located here are Lakshmi, Ganapati, Saraswathi temple and Naga Devatha.

== Timings ==
The temple is open from 6a.m. to 1p.m. and 3p.m. to 8p.m. from Monday to Saturday.

On Sundays, the temple is open from 6a.m. to 8:30 p.m.
