= Chengicherla =

- Exurb
- Location in Telangana, India Chengicherla (Telangana) Chengicherla (India)
- Coordinates: 17.4420167°N 78.599525°E
- Country: India
- State: Telangana

Languages
  - Official: Telugu
- Time zone: UTC+5:30 (IST)
- Postal code: 500098
- Telephone code: 040
- Vehicle registration: TG-08

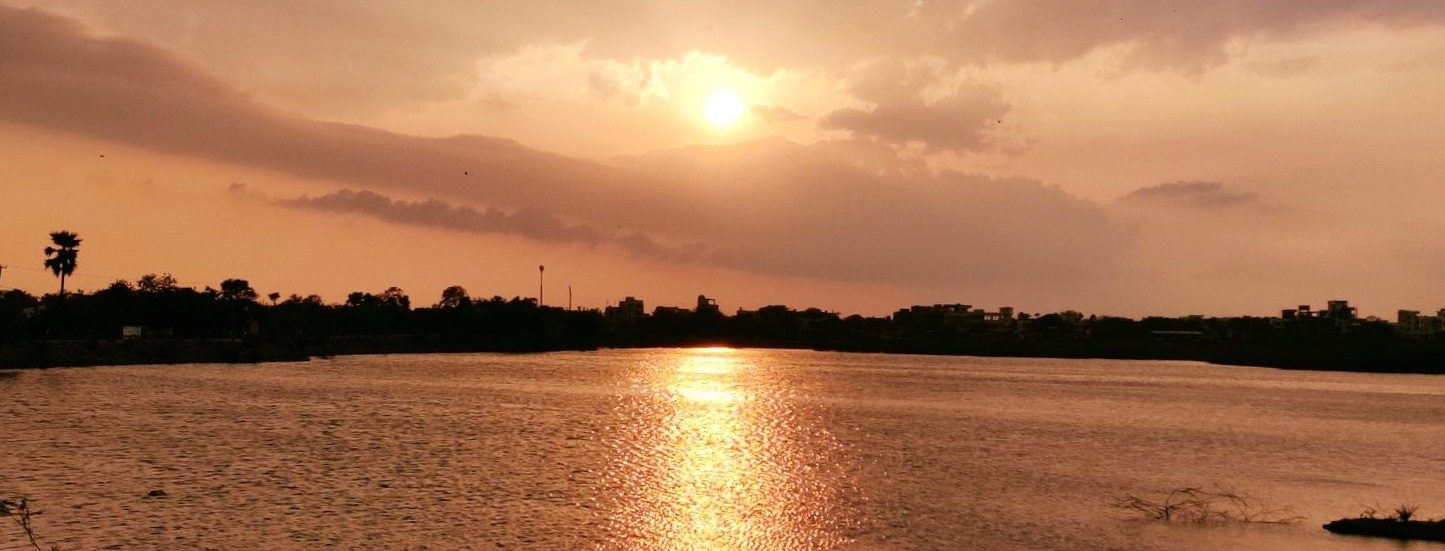
Sunset on a lake in Chengicherla beside the Bus-Depot

Chengicherla is a locality in Hyderabad. It falls under Medipally, Telangana mandal of the Medchal–Malkajgiri district in Telangana, India. It is administered by Boduppal Municipal Corporation. Chengicherla was merged with Boduppal gram panchayat in 2016 to form Boduppal Municipality which was later upgraded to municipal corporation in 2019.

A major abattoir, Chengicherla Abattoir, is located here.
