= Azamabad, Hyderabad =

Azambad
- neighbourhood
- Location in Telangana, India Azambad (Telangana) Azambad (India)
- Country: India
- State: Telangana
- District: Hyderabad
- Metro: Hyderabad
- Founded by: City Improvement Board

Government
  - Body: GHMC
- Time zone: UTC+5:30 (IST)
- PIN: 500020
- Vehicle registration: TG
- Planning agency: GHMC
- Civic agency: GHMC
- Website: telangana.gov.in

Azamabad is one of oldest Industrial area located in Hyderabad, India. The industrial area of Azambad was established during the reign of the Nizam on an area of 120 acres (0.49 km^{2}) east of Hussain Sagar lake by City Improvement Board to set up various industries such as tobacco, matches and silk so as to improve the economy of Hyderabad.

VST Industries which was established in 1930 is located at Azambad.
