= Hyderabad International Convention Centre =

Venue in Hyderabad, Telangana, India

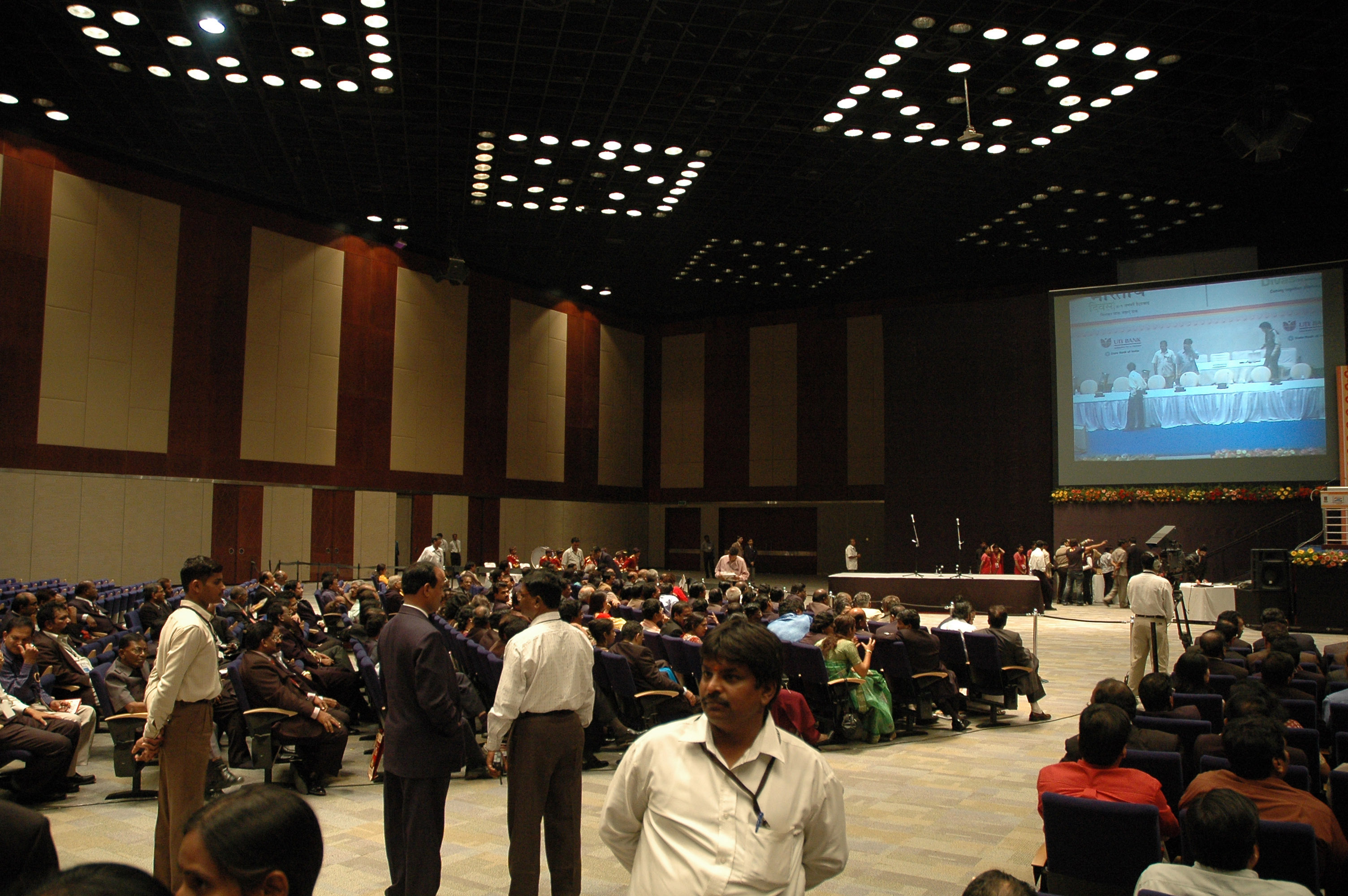

General information
- Architectural style: Contemporary high-tech modernist architectural style
- Location: Hyderabad, Telangana, India
- Coordinates: 17.473°N 78.374°E
- Inaugurated: 7 January 2006; 20 years ago

Design and construction
- Main contractor: Emaar MGF

Other information
- Seating capacity: 6,500

Hyderabad International Convention Centre is an modern convention centre located in Hyderabad, Telangana, India. To create an events destination in Hyderabad, then chief minister N. Chandrababu Naidu created a convention hub with the Hyderabad International Convention Centre, is a purpose-built, state-of-the-art convention facility, the first of its kind in South Asia. The convention centre was built by Emaar MGF of India. It has been the winner of the excellence award for "Best Standalone Convention Centre" for a record four times, nationally awarded by Ministry of Tourism, Government of India and the company is part owned by Emaar of UAE. The facility is managed by Accor Hospitality. The Hyderabad International Convention Centre with 5,000 seating capacity is India's largest convention facility. It is an integrated 27,000-square-metre (290,000 sq ft) covering 6.1 ha (15 acres). The centre can be configured to increase seating capacity to about 6,500. The convention centre is connected to Novotel Hyderabad, an international business hotel, it has 288 rooms and is equipped with meeting rooms, restaurants, business centre, spa and a health club.
