= Bharat Nagar =

- Neighbourhood
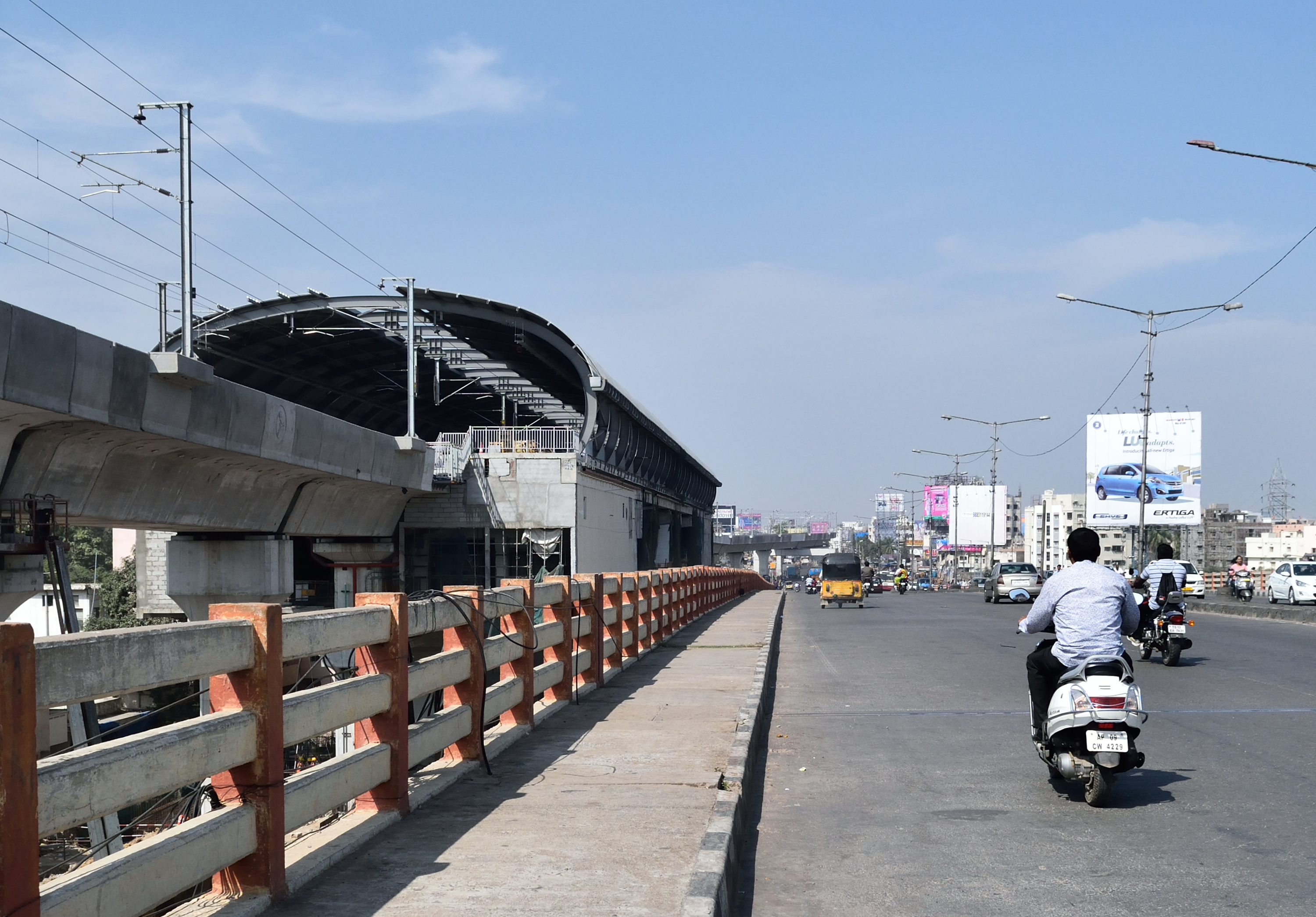
- Bharat Nagar metro station under construction as seen from Bharat Nagar flyover

- Location in Telangana, India Bharat Nagar (Telangana) Bharat Nagar (India)
- Coordinates: 17°27′48″N 78°25′44″E
- Country: India
- State: Telangana
- District: Ranga Reddy district
- Metro: Hyderabad

Government
  - Body: GHMC

Languages
  - Official: Telugu
- Time zone: UTC+5:30 (IST)
- PIN: 500018
- Planning agency: GHMC
- Civic agency: GHMC
- Website: telangana.gov.in

Bharat Nagar is a neighbourhood in the northwestern part of the city of Hyderabad, India. Prior to being incorporated into the Greater Hyderabad Municipal Corporation (GHMC), it was part of the Kukatpally municipality. At present it is located in Circle XIV of the GHMC, on Sanjeeva Reddy Nagar Main Road (NH-9) at the flyover, south of Moosapet. It is in the eastern part of the Motinagar election ward. It is located by the Pune Hyderabad Machilipatnam highway NH 65.

== Transport ==
Bharat Nagar is connected by buses run by TGRTC. Buses that run are 218D, 113, and 10. There is an MMTS train station and a station on the Red Line of the Hyderabad Metro at Bharat Nagar.

The buses from Secunderabad station to Bharath Nagar are 10K, 10K/L,10K/18.

== Culture ==
Bharath Nagar is famous for Hari Hara Temple.
