= Gudimalkapur market =

Aerial view of Gudimalkapur Vegetable market

Gudimalkapur market is a vegetable market located in Hyderabad, India. It is located in Gudimalkapur suburb. The vegetables are mainly brought from the neighbouring Ranga Reddy district. Many hawkers sell outside the market yard on bicycles and mopeds.

== Flower market ==
The wholesale Jambagh flower market was shifted to Gudimalkapur market in 2009.
