= Jambagh flower market =

Jambagh flower market is a flower market located at Hyderabad, India. It is part of Moazzam Jahi Market.

The flower market was shifted to Gudimalkapur market in 2009.
