= List of defence research centers in Hyderabad =

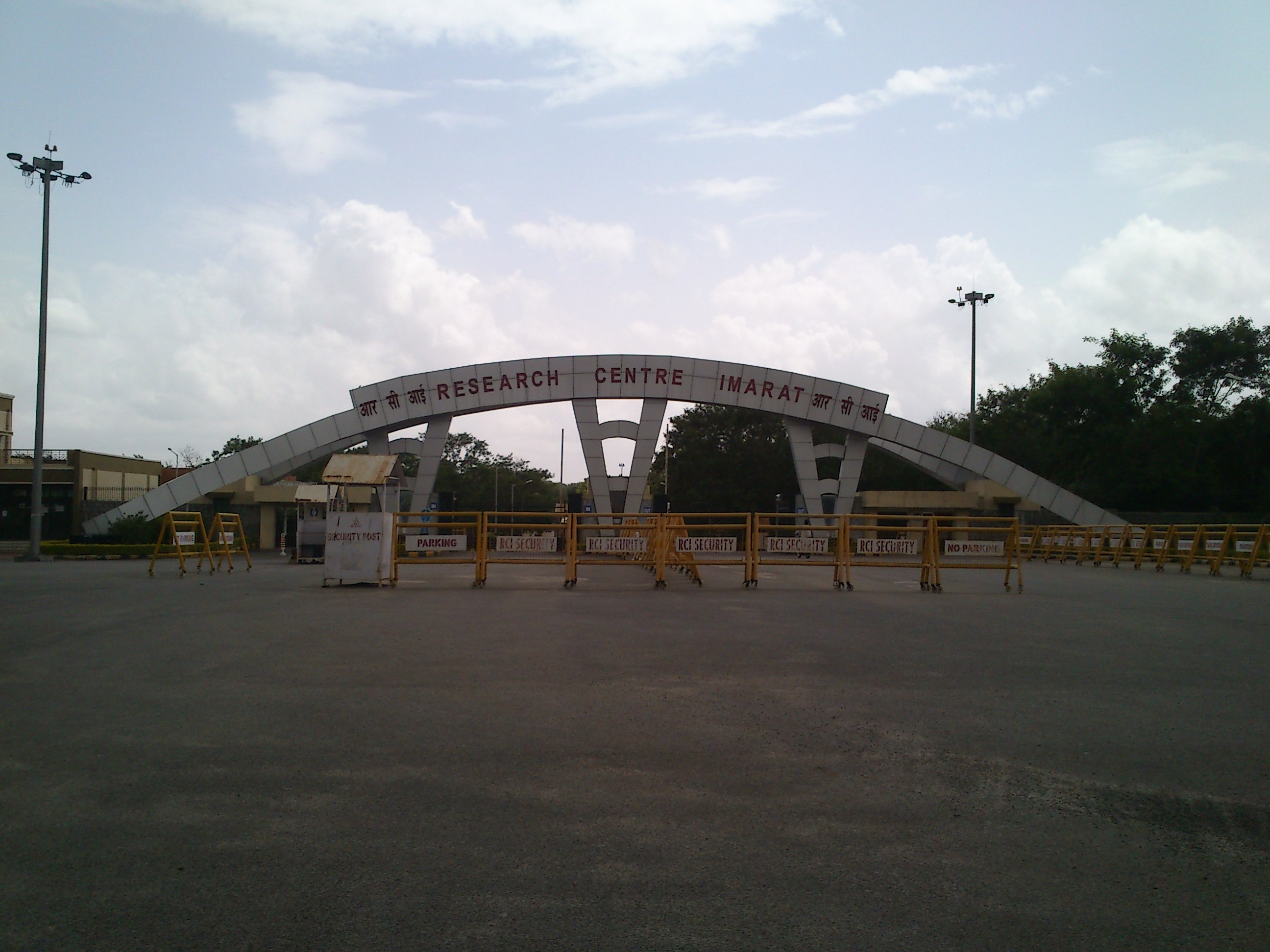
Research Centre Imarat

Hyderabad, India is a major hub of Defense research and missile technology in India. The city houses many multinational and Indian premier research centers for defense technology.

== Indian Premier Defence Centers ==
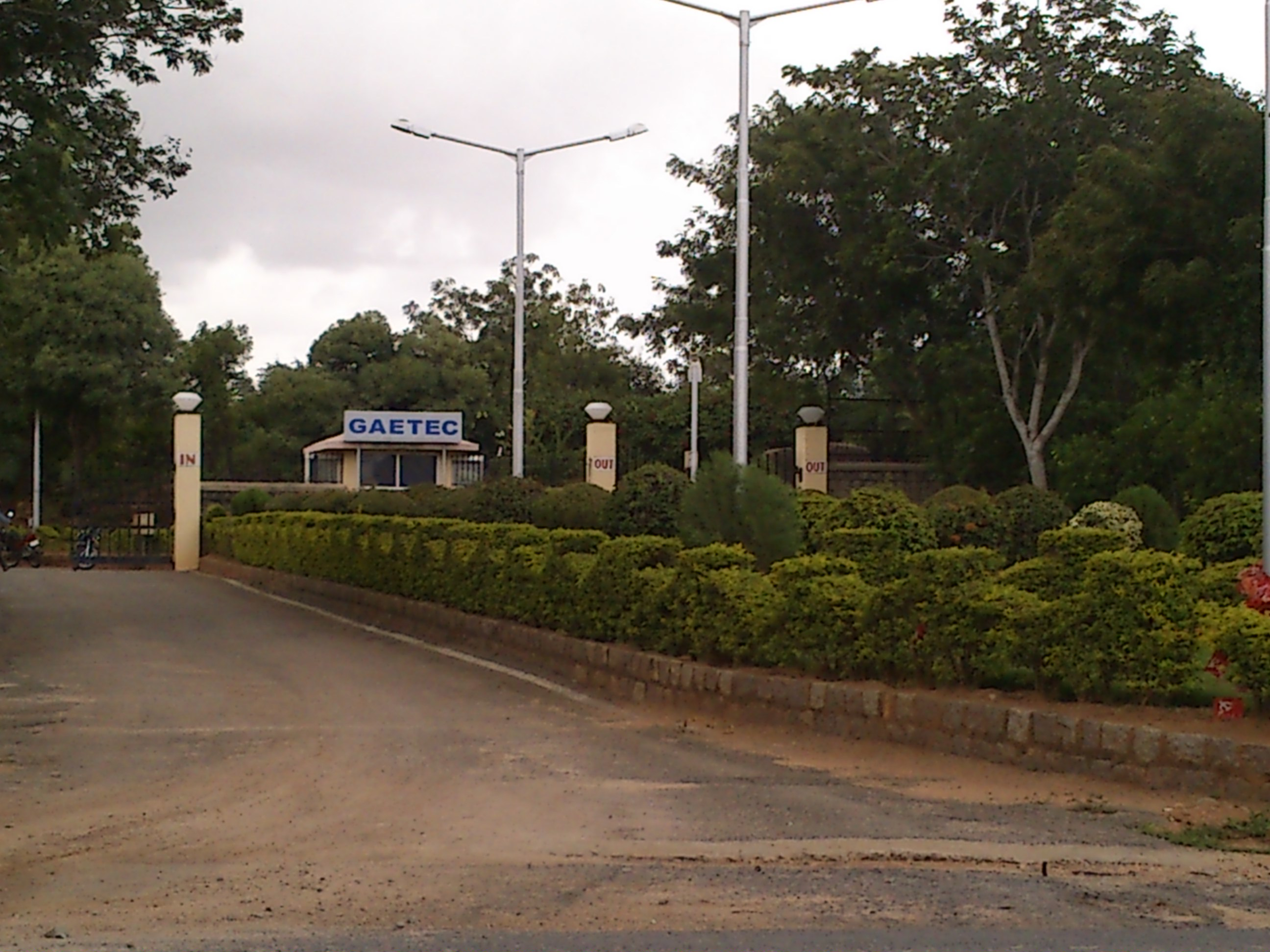
GAETEC

- Advanced Numerical Research and Analysis Group (ANURAG)
- Defence Electronics Research Laboratory (DLRL)
- Defence Metallurgical Research Laboratory (DMRL)
- Research Centre Imarat (RCI)
- Centre for Advanced Systems (CAS)

== Private Partnership ==
- Tata Advanced Systems (TAS)
- Saab India Technology Centre (SITC)
- DuPont Ballistics Facility (DBF)
- National Balloon Facility (NBF)
