= Kasu Brahmananda Reddy National Park =

National park in Hyderabad, Telangana, India

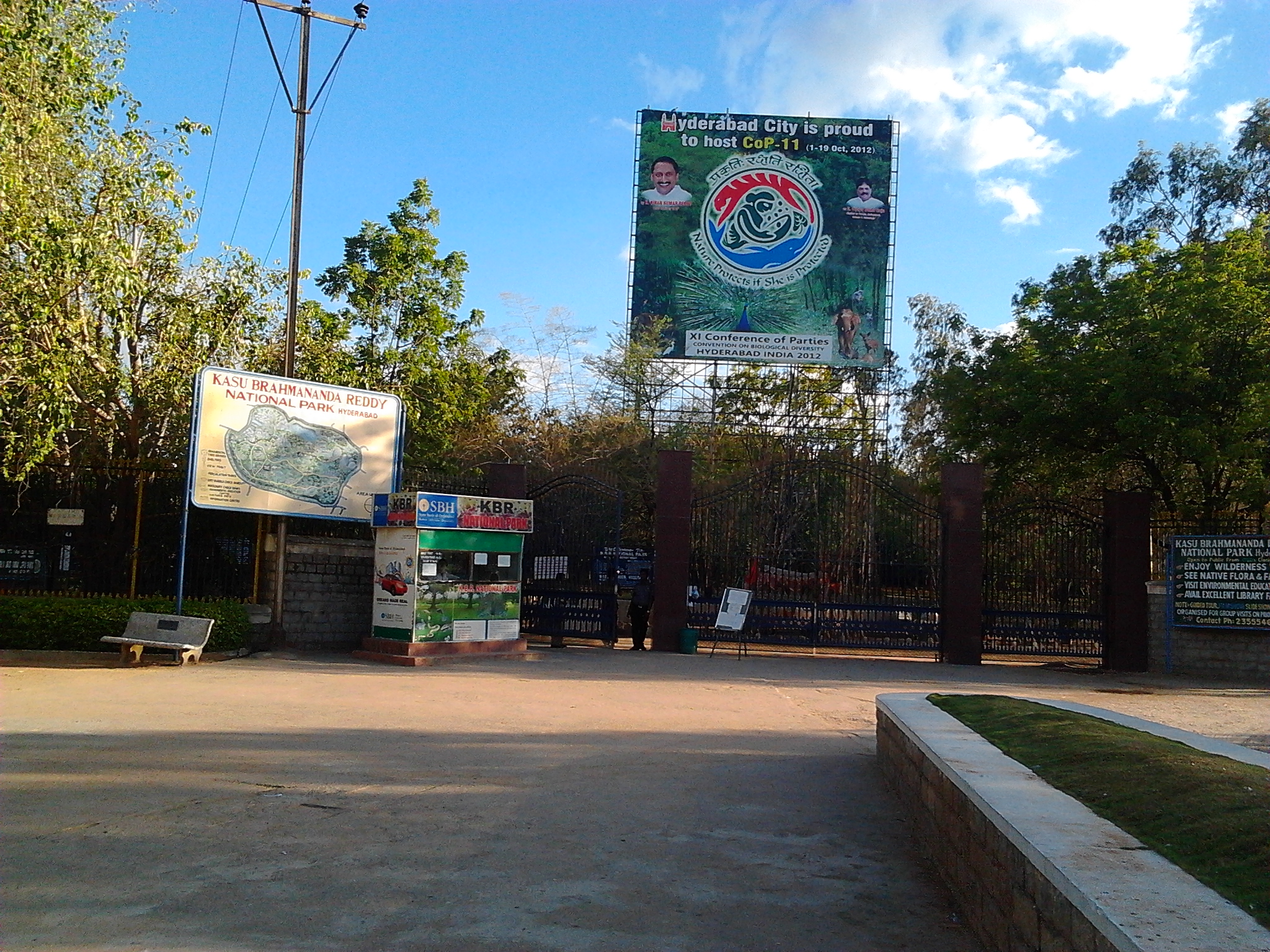

- Location within Hyderabad Location within Telangana Location within India
- Interactive map of Kasu Brahmananda Reddy National Park
- Location: Jubilee Hills, Hyderabad, Telangana
- Nearest city: Hyderabad
- Coordinates: 17°25′14″N 78°25′09″E

Kasu Brahmananda Reddy National Park is a national park located in Jubilee Hills and Banjara Hills in Hyderabad, Telangana, India. The park has an approximate area of 390 acres (1.6 km^{2}). The palace complex was given to Prince Mukarram Jah on his coronation by his father Prince Azam Jah in 1967. It was declared as a National park by the Andhra Pradesh state government after getting approval from the central government in the year 1998. It is located centrally in Jubilee Hills and is described as a jungle amidst the concrete jungle.The Eco sensitive zone was declared on 27 October 2020 by Govt. of India.

The complex has the palace and besides it the other property include Mor (peacock) bungalow on a hillock, Gol Bungalow; stables for elephant, horses and cattle, motor khana that housed a fleet of exquisite vintage cars, a workshop for heavy machinery, petrol pump, several outhouses, two wells and an equal number of water tanks.

== National park status ==
The entire palace complex area was declared as a National park by the Andhra Pradesh state government after getting permission from the central government in the year 1998. This gave control of the major part of the land to the forest department and the Nizam was left with the control of only about 11 acres. As time passed the control of the Nizam was further reduced to the present less than six acres. Further the park was renamed to Kasu Brahmananda Reddy National Park with only the palace building being referred to as Chiran palace, built in 1940.

In June 2010 the Prince and his representatives reached an agreement with the state government to exchange Chiran Palace and 16 other pieces of his property scattered over the national park with six acres of land on the north-west corner of the park. This land would not be considered the part of the National park and thus will not provide access to forest officials and visitors to the park. All the properties on the land, including the Chiran palace, would be notified as part of the national park and the land to be handed out to the prince was struck out of the park.

This agreement received the approval of The Indian Board of Wildlife, Supreme Court, and the central government.

== The Palace ==
The Chiran Palace, unlike the other palaces of the Nizam like Falaknuma or Chowmahalla, is a modern facility designed to serve the needs of the prince. It is not a palace in the traditional sense of the term. It is more like a big villa constructed on 6,000 sq meters of land.

The duplex type palace has two cellars where the prince had his billiard room along with a large conference hall. The ground floor contains an armory hall, two guest rooms in addition to his office, a place for visitors, pantry and kitchen etc. The first floor comprises seven bedrooms where the Nizam lived with his wife and children.

== The Park ==
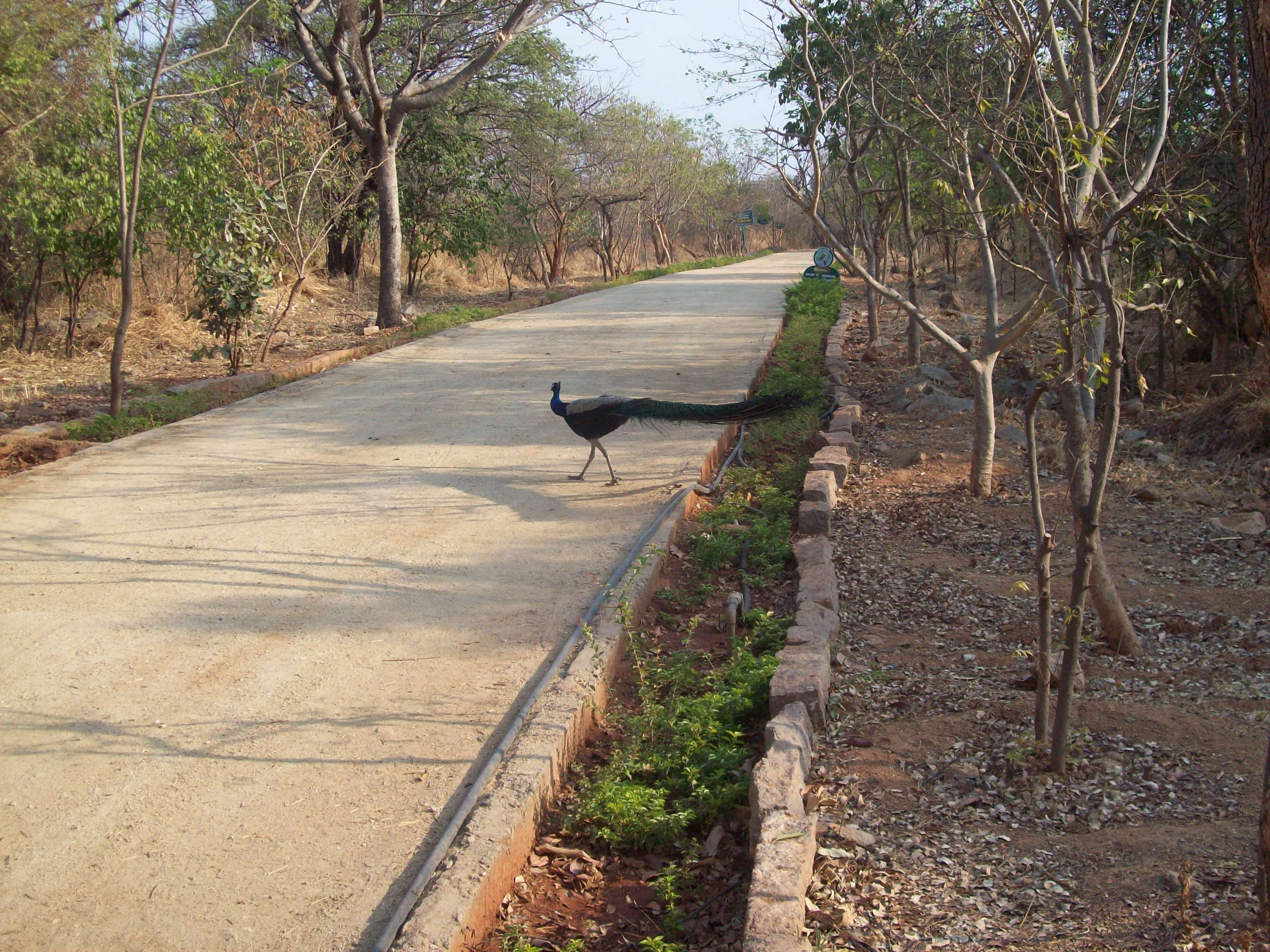
Peacock in the park

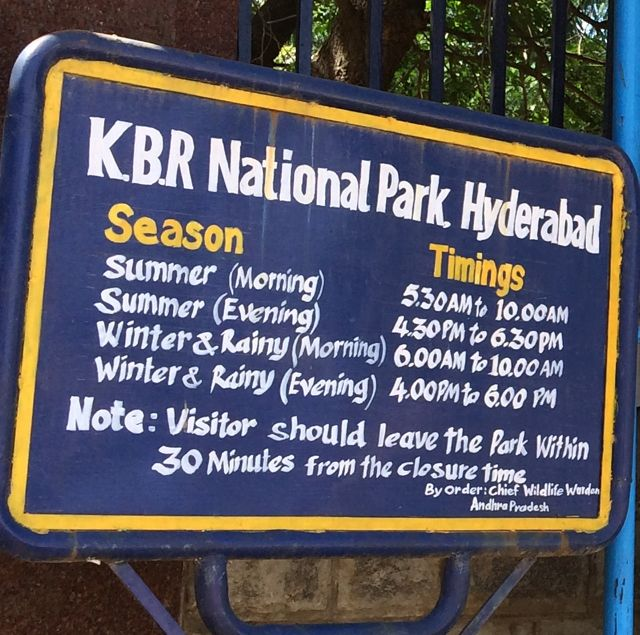
Hours sign as of 2013.11.27

The park provides an excellent lung space and environment from the busy city life and rising pollution levels. The park has over 600 species of plant life, 140 species of birds and 30 different varieties of butterflies and reptiles. Some of the animals making their home in the park include: pangolin, small Indian civet, peacock, jungle cat and porcupines. There are few water bodies present in the park providing the needed moisture for the plants and quenching the thirst of birds and small animals.

The park is frequented in the evenings and weekends by young and old alike.

In a letter to the Chief Minister of Telangana state Himayat Ali Mirza, the great-grandson of the Nizam VII, stated that the way his uncle Prince Mukarram Jah's property known as Chiran palace was converted into KBR park, Nizam's other lands ranging over thousands of acres seized under the ULC Act, 1976 should be converted into green parks and spaces for the general public.

== Transport ==
One can commute to KBR Park through nearest Metro station at Jubilee Hills Check Post or nearest MMTS station which is at Begumpet. Annapurna Studios, Park Hyatt and LV Prasad Eye Hospital are some of the closest landmarks.

== See also ==
- Nizam Palace (Kolkata)
- Chowmahalla Palace
- Falaknuma Palace
