= Indira Park =

Public park in Hyderabad, India

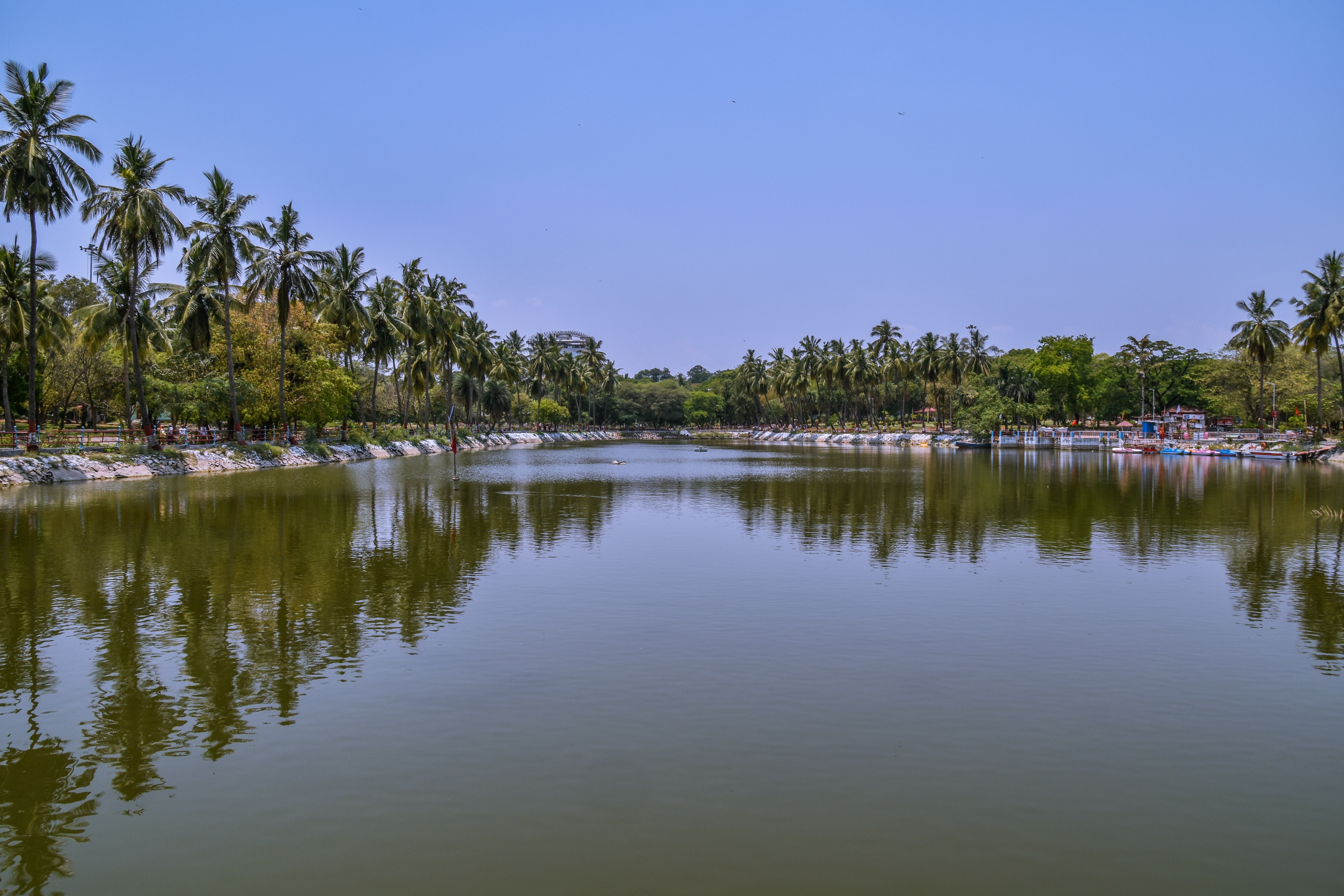
- View of the lake at Indira Park

- Location within Hyderabad
- Type: Public park
- Location: Hyderabad, India
- Coordinates: 17.414754°N 78.483045°E
- Area: 76 acres (310,000 m^{2})
- Created: 1978; 48 years ago
- Operator: Hyderabad Metropolitan Development Authority
- Status: Open all year

Indira Park is a public greenspace and park in the heart of Hyderabad, India. The foundation stone for the Indira Park was laid during September 1975 by the then President of India Fakhruddin Ahmed and was opened to the public in the year 1978 with complete landscaping. Indira Park occupies 76 acres (310,000 m^{2}) of area. The park located in Domalguda is managed by the Hyderabad Metropolitan Development Authority and lies along the Hussain Sagar lake. The park contains a rock garden.

== Facilities ==
In 2001, the civic authorities of Hyderabad planned to construct a rock garden inside the park. Besides the garden, which was to be constructed over an area of 2 acres (0.81 ha), other recreational facilities were planned to be set up. A man-made desert and purification of the lake within the park so as to enable a boating facility were also to be taken up. These new plans were to assist the park in its promotion as a tourist destination. Subrata Basu, the then local commissioner of customs and excise duty, had earlier succeeded with a similar rock sanctuary in Shilparamam, an arts and handicrafts village near Hyderabad.

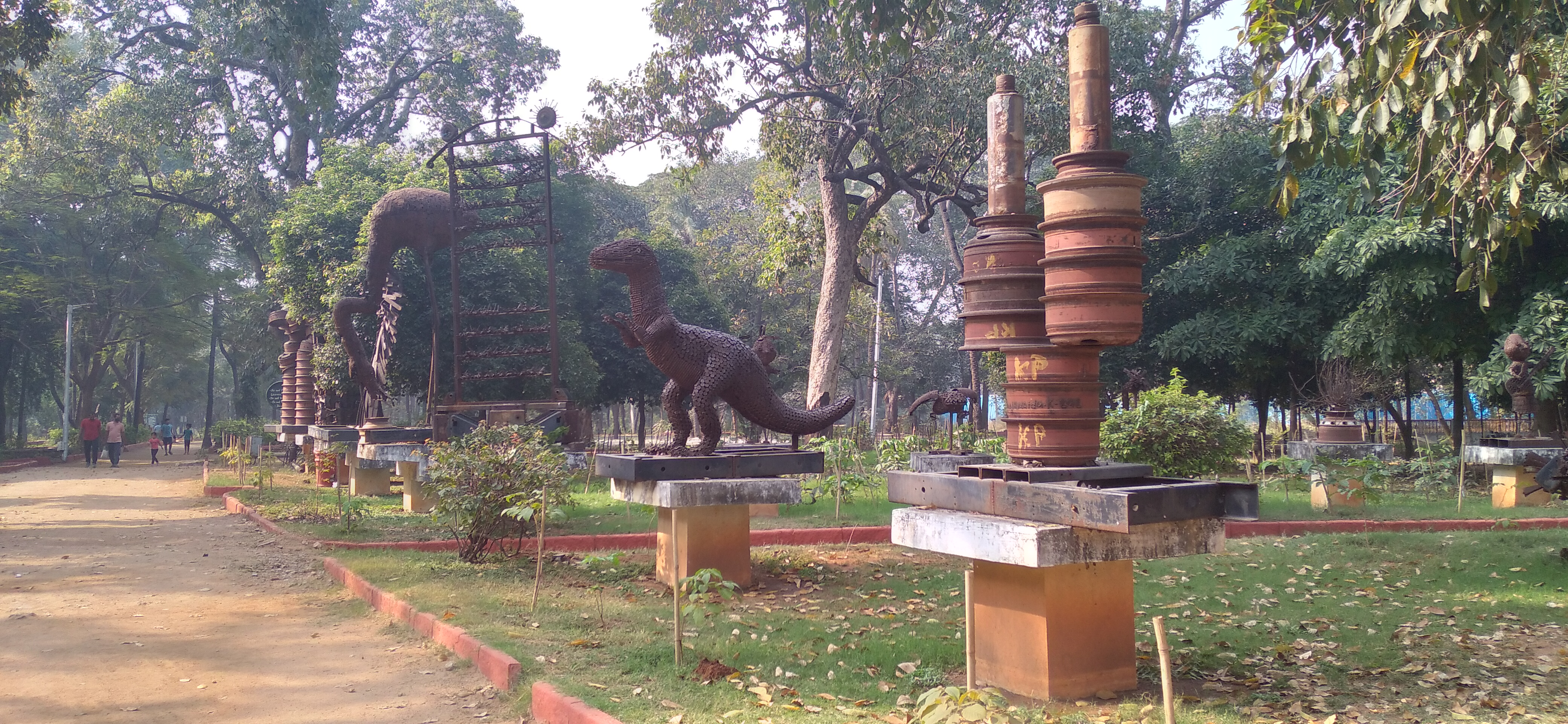
Statue Path in Indira Park

In 2002, the rock garden was readied as per the ideas of Basu's designs. While explaining his zeal in design the garden, Basu said that the natural rock formations were in danger from real estate developers. He only wished to preserve them. In the same year, the local government honored Basu's contribution with an award.

The Park has a pathway (dubbed "Statue Path") which showcases abstract cast iron statues. These include various human, animal and abstract forms.

Sandalwood trees are spread across the park's interiors. Though the sandalwood is inferior in its quality as compared to trees growing in other regions, the bark could be used as firewood and can also be used as an ingredient in cosmetics products.

The park has a large lake which is fed from controlled flow from Hussain Sagar lake. There are boating activities on this lake for recreation.

== As a centre of agitations ==
The park has been a centre of agitations by various strata of the society since early 2000. Rallies or sit-ins have been organised towards achieving goals by dalit rights groups, auto rickshaws unions, students and teachers, political leaders, and others. On an average, three such rallies are given permission by the local authorities.

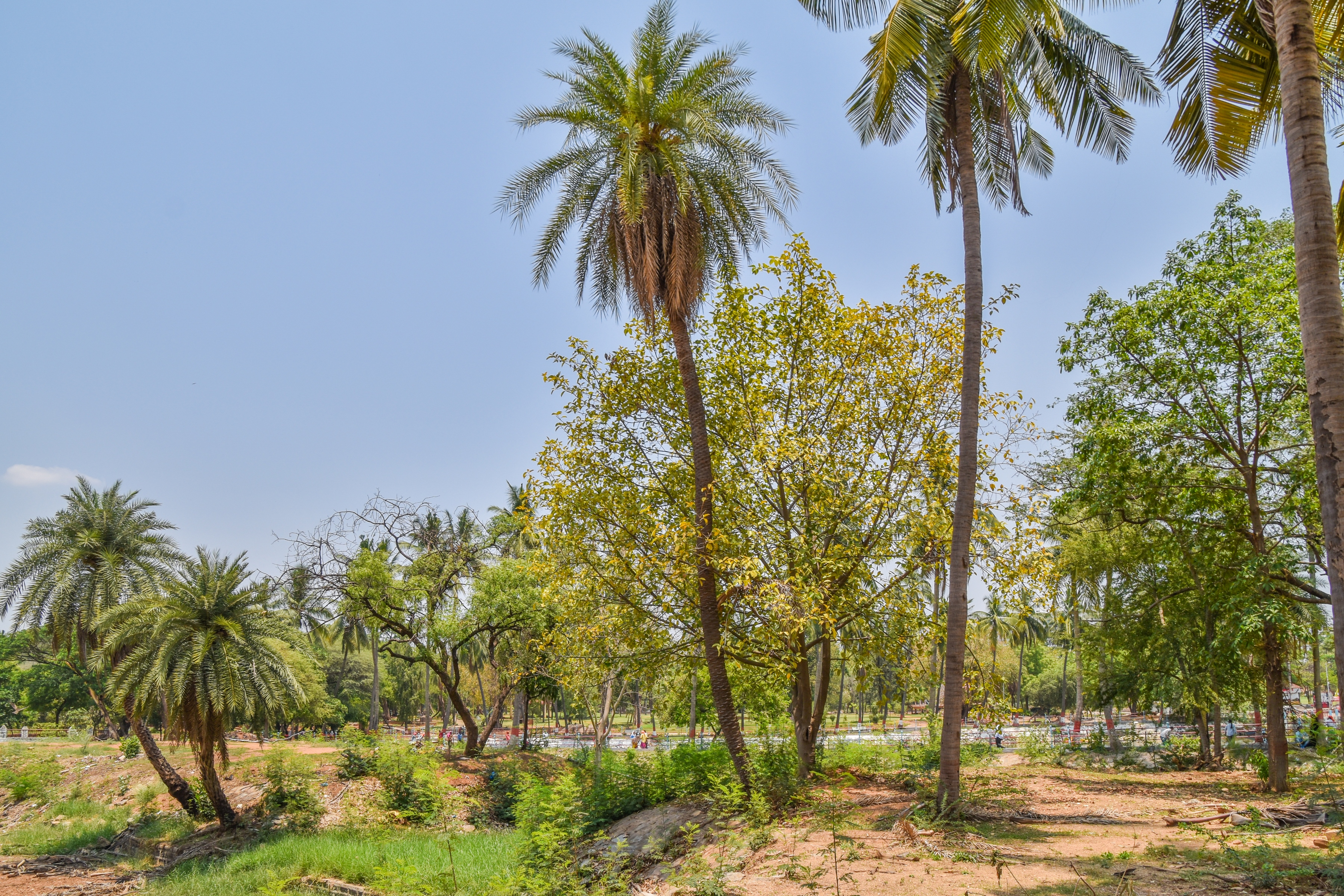
Trees in Indira Park

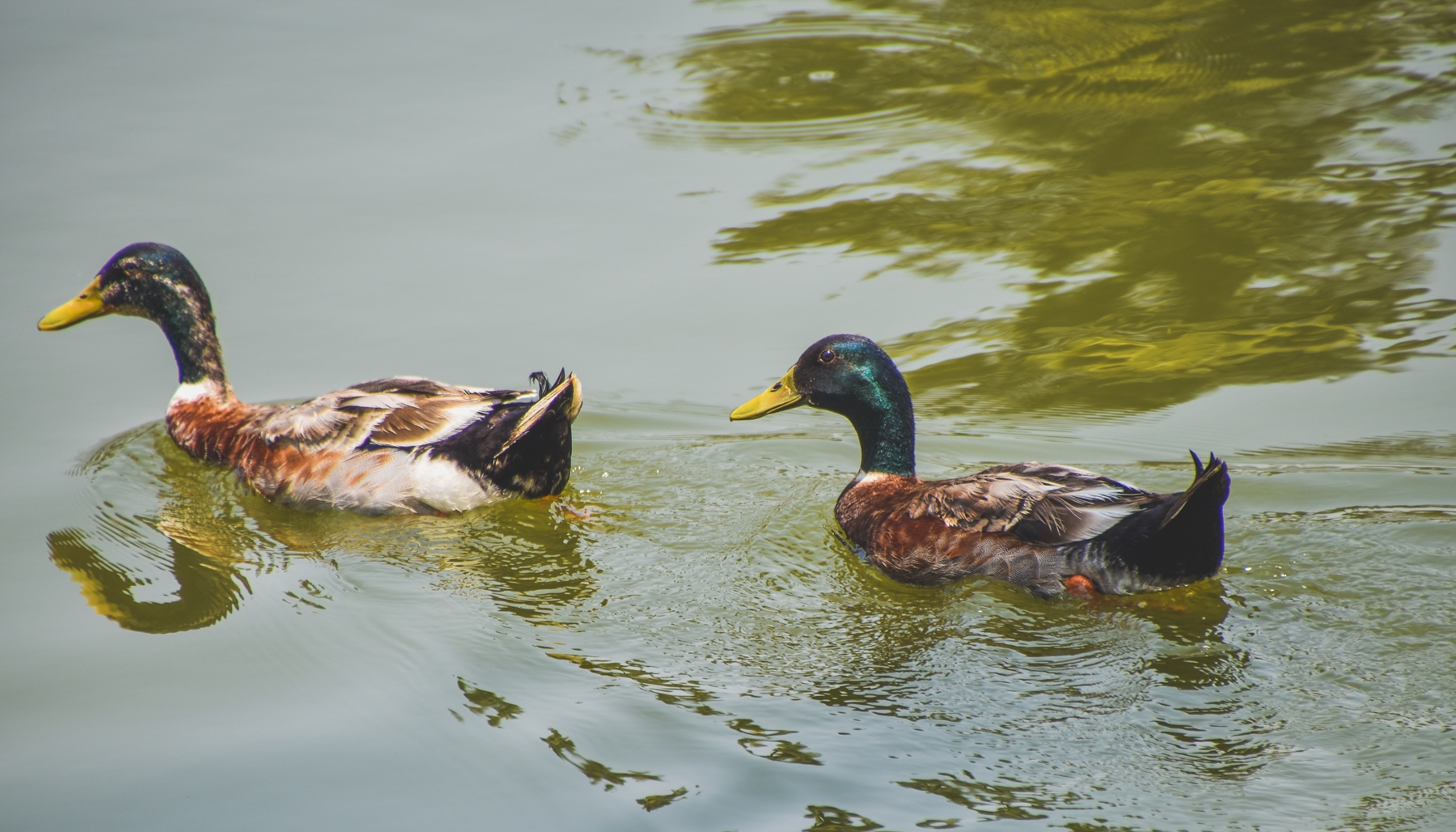
Ducks in the lake

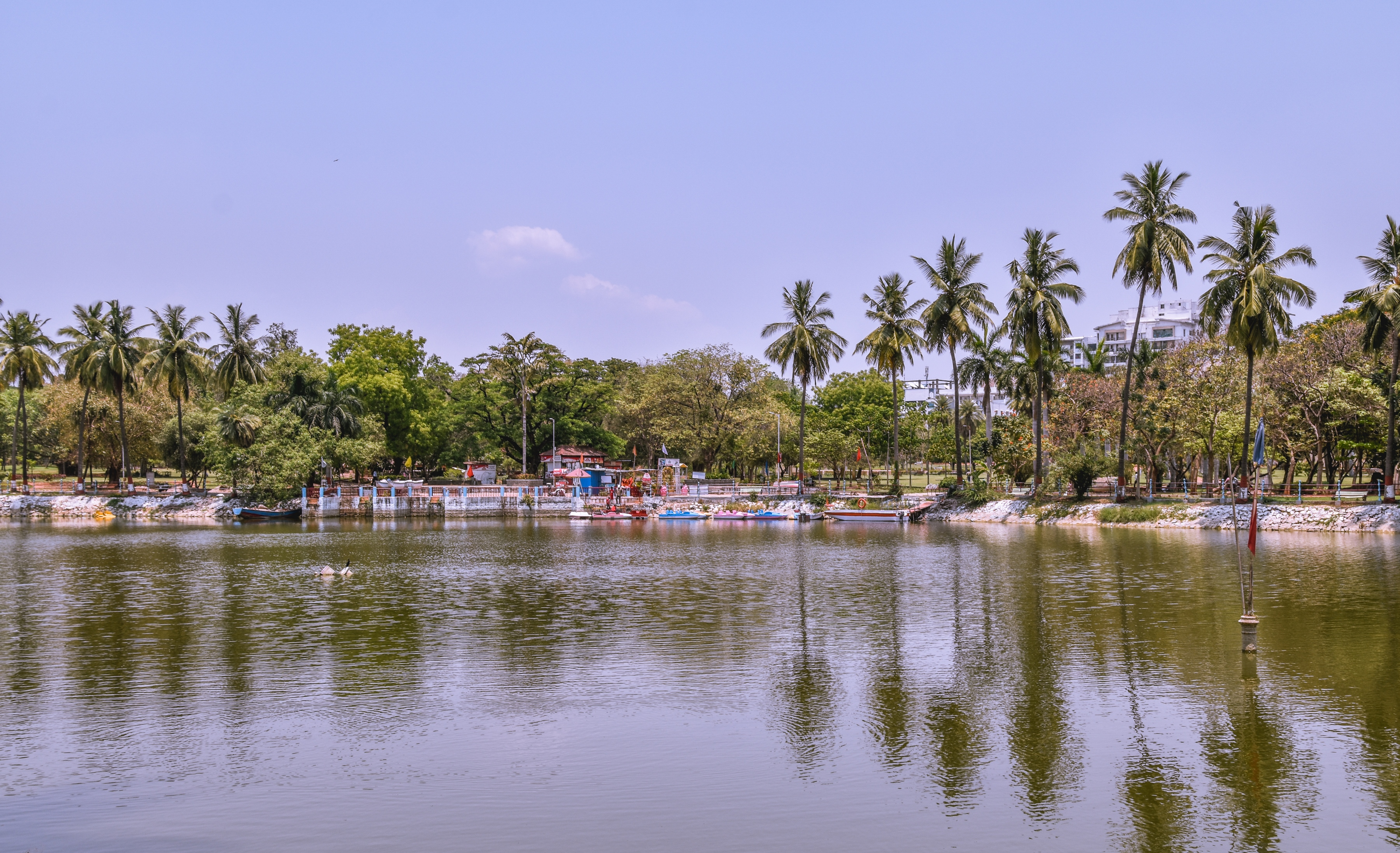
View of the pier on the lake

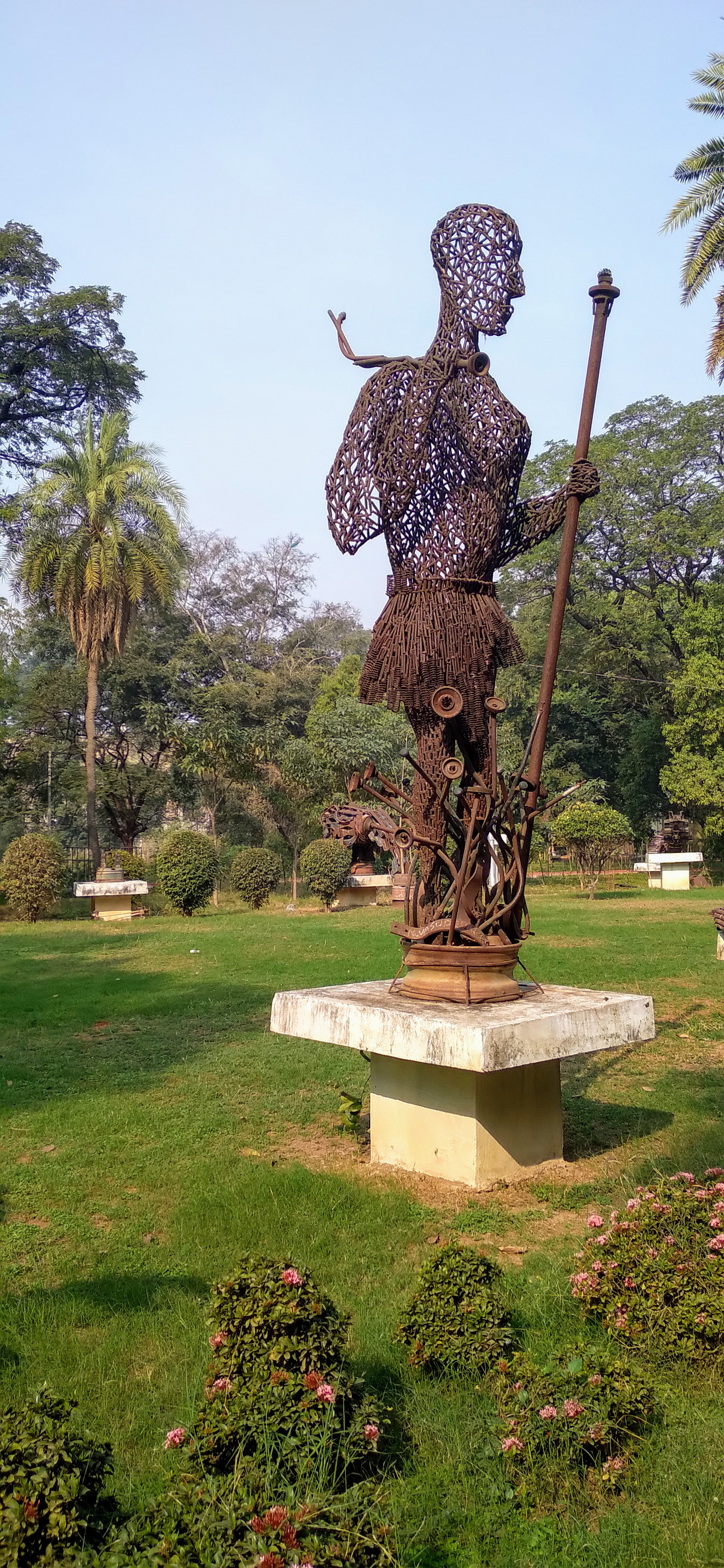
Sculpture at Indira Park
