= District Grand Lodge of Madras =

Indian Masonic organization

- Established: 1866; 160 years ago (as District Grand Lodge of Madras under the United Grand Lodge of England)
- Location: India
- Region served: Madras
- Website: dglofmadras.org

The District Grand Lodge of Madras is a Masonic organization under the jurisdiction of the United Grand Lodge of England (UGLE), serving as the administrative and governing body for Freemasonry lodges in the southern Indian states of Tamil Nadu, Telangana, Andhra Pradesh, Karnataka, and Kerala.

Collectively referred to as the "District of Madras" for Masonic purposes, this region has a history of Freemasonry dating back over 250 years.

== History ==
Freemasonry arrived on the Coromandel Coast of India in the mid-18th century, with the first lodge consecrated in Madras (now Chennai) in 1752 under the authority of the United Grand Lodge of England.

This marked the beginning of organized Freemasonry in southern India, initially tied to the presence of the British East India Company. The oldest surviving lodge in the District, Lodge of Perfect Unanimity No. 150, was established in 1786 and celebrated its bicentenary in 1986, making it a cornerstone of Masonic heritage in the region.

The District Grand Lodge of Madras was formally designated as a "District" under the UGLE in 1866, reflecting a reorganization of Masonic governance in colonial India. Prior to this, the region operated under Provincial Grand Masters, with Captain Edmund Pascal appointed as the first in 1752. Freemasonry in the region adapted to the post-independence era, maintaining its traditions while fostering a sense of community among members in southern India.

== Masonic Temple ==
In the mid-19th century, the Lodge of Perfect Unanimity constructed a Masonic temple near the Madras seafront. When the location proved inconvenient, the building was rented to and later purchased by the Madras Police, becoming the police headquarters of Chennai; Masonic symbols from its earlier use remain visible on the building.

Freemasons’ Hall at Egmore was formally opened on 26 February 1925 by Lord Goschen, then Governor of Madras, providing the first permanent home for Freemasonry in the city after more than a century of meetings at temporary venues such as Fort St. George, the Pantheon, Vepery, and Mount Road.

The move to Egmore followed decades of frequent relocations caused by financial and spatial constraints. After recommendations made between 1914 and 1916 by Masonic officials, the District Grand Lodge consolidated resources to build a modern, shared temple, establishing Freemasons’ Hall, Egmore, as a significant institutional and architectural landmark in Chennai.

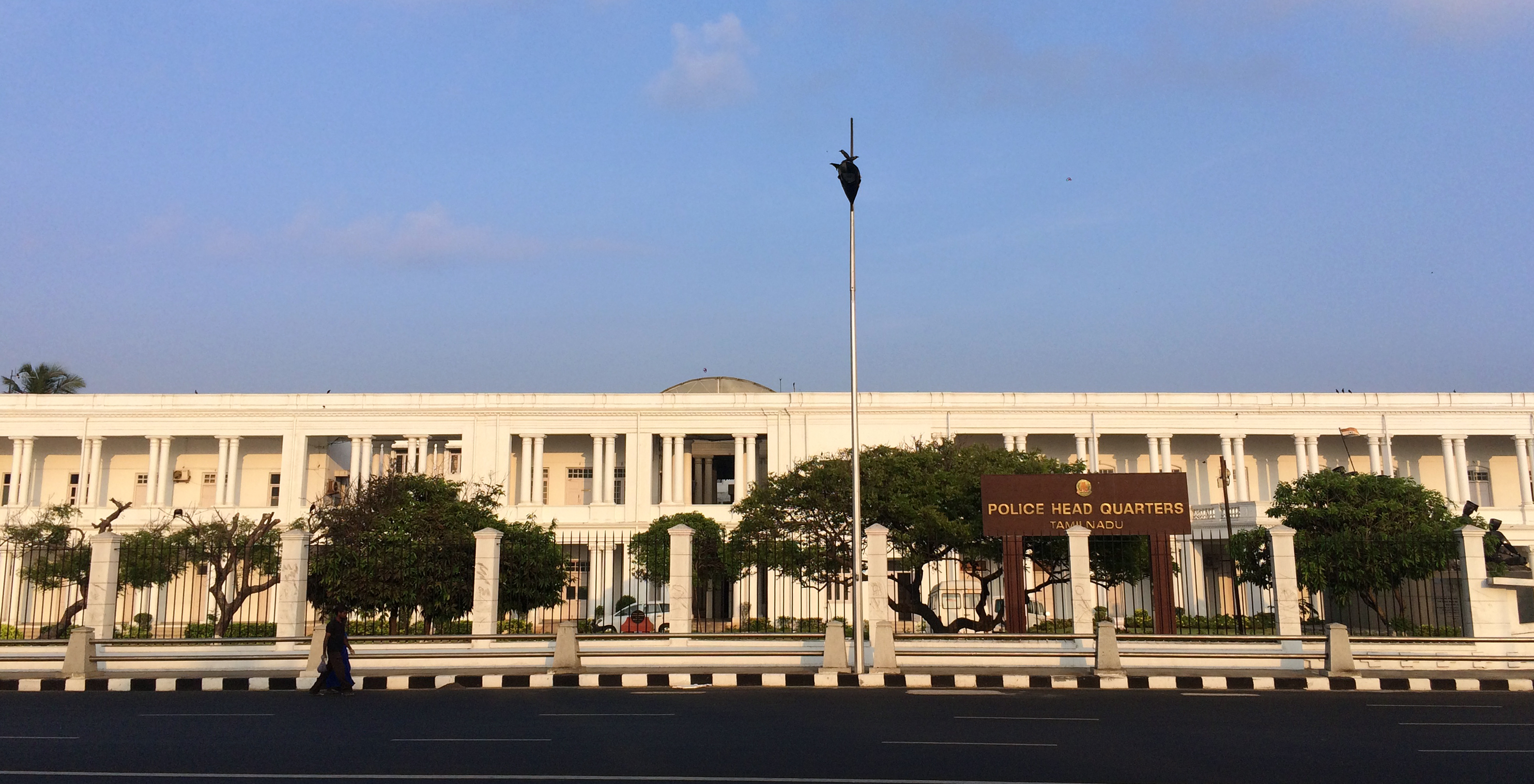
Early Masonic temple later acquired by the Madras Police

Masonic Meeting Places in Madras (Chennai)

Location	Area	Type	Notes
Fort St. George	Fort	Temporary	Earliest documented meetings; exact temple location unknown
Site of present St. Andrew’s Kirk	Egmore	Temporary	Early Masonic temple noted by H. D. Love
Old Jail premises	Broadway	Temporary	Used for meetings in early period
General Collins’ House	Vepery	Temporary	Venue of first recorded DGL meeting (1799)
Pantheon	Pantheon Road	Temporary	Major shared venue; jointly hired by Lodge PU and DGL
House near Spur Tank	Spur Tank	Temporary	Rented as DGL office
Bungalow behind the Pantheon	Egmore	Temporary	Former Lodge St. Andrew premises
College House	College Road	Temporary	Still extant; later government use
Unspecified premises	Vepery	Temporary	Shared by multiple lodges in mid-19th century
Book Mooneappa’s Library (upper room)	Mount Road	Temporary	Lodge Carnatic meeting place

Purpose-Built or Long-Term Masonic Buildings

Location	Area	Status	Notes
Beach Road Masonic Temple	Seafront	Sold	Built by Lodge PU; later sold to Madras Police; now Tamil Nadu Police HQ
Cotgrave House	Vepery	Repurposed	Major shared lodge building; now St. Aloysius Convent
Masonic Hall, Vepery	Vepery	Temporary	Used during repairs and transitions
Mount Road Masonic Hall (Chisholm design)	Mount Road	Sold	Architect R. F. Chisholm; sold to fund Egmore move
Freemasons’ Hall	Egmore	Permanent	Opened 1925; current headquarters of DGL Madras

== Activities & Cultural significance ==
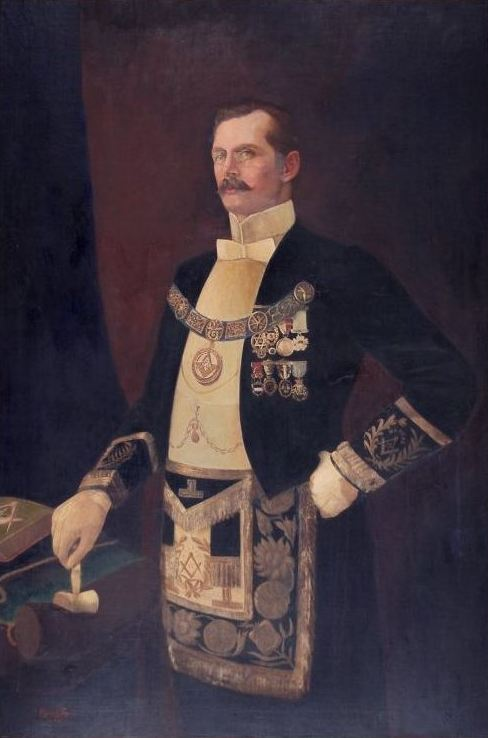
Portrait of RW Bro. Lord Ampthill, Governor of Madras from 1900 to 1906.

Freemasonry in the District of Madras has historical ties to colonial architecture and cultural events in southern India. The laying of the foundation stone for Presidency College in Chennai on February 6, 1867, by Lord Napier, a prominent Freemason and then-Governor, exemplifies this connection.

The District maintains a museum and library at its headquarters in Chennai, preserving artifacts and documents related to its history and the broader story of Freemasonry in India.

The District Grand Charity Fund Trust serves as the charitable arm of the organization, supporting initiatives such as scholarships, medical aid, and assistance to masons in distress. These efforts reflect Freemasonry's emphasis on philanthropy and community service.

== Gallery ==
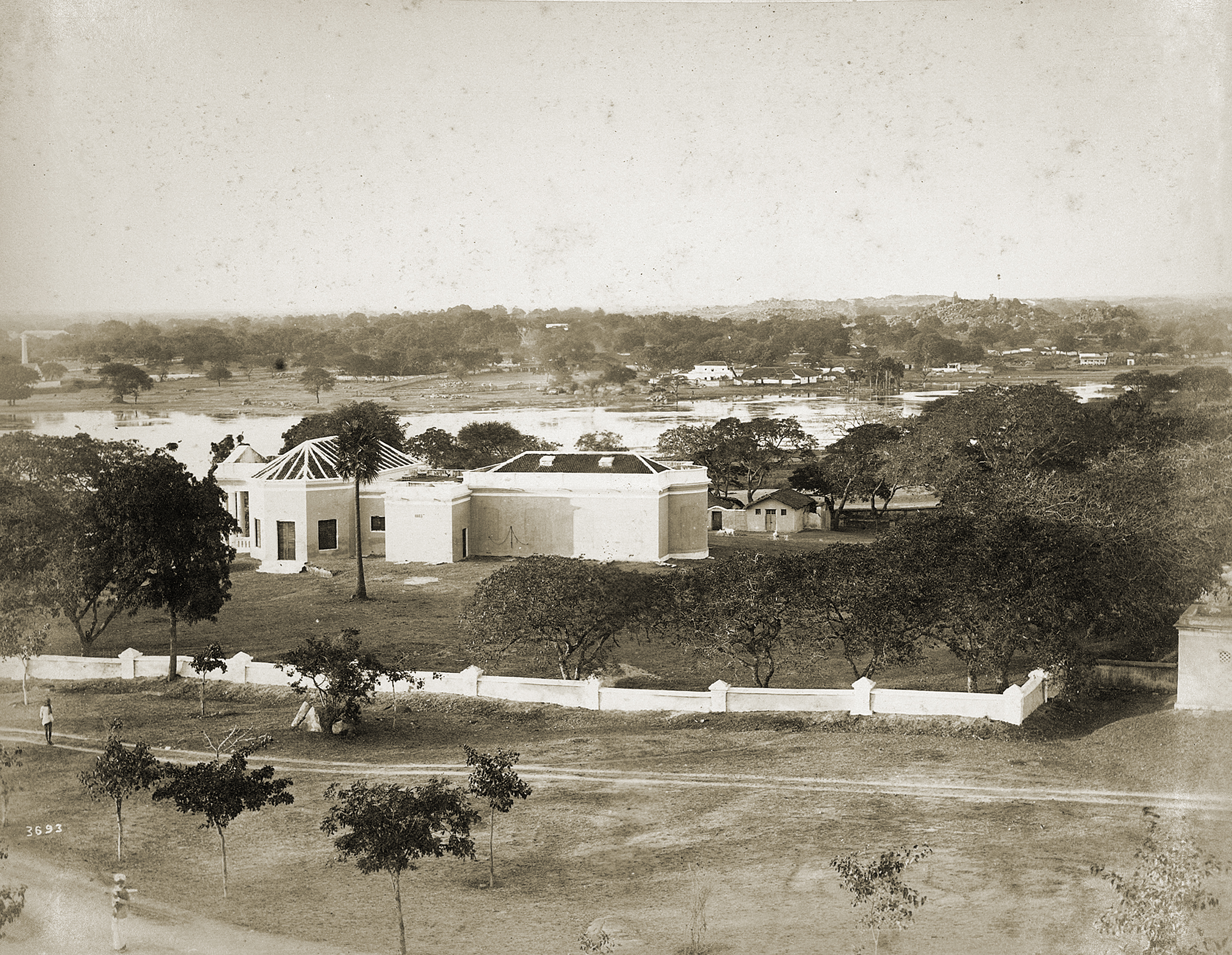
St. John's Masonic Lodge & Temple (St. John's Lodge No. 434 EC) Secunderabad

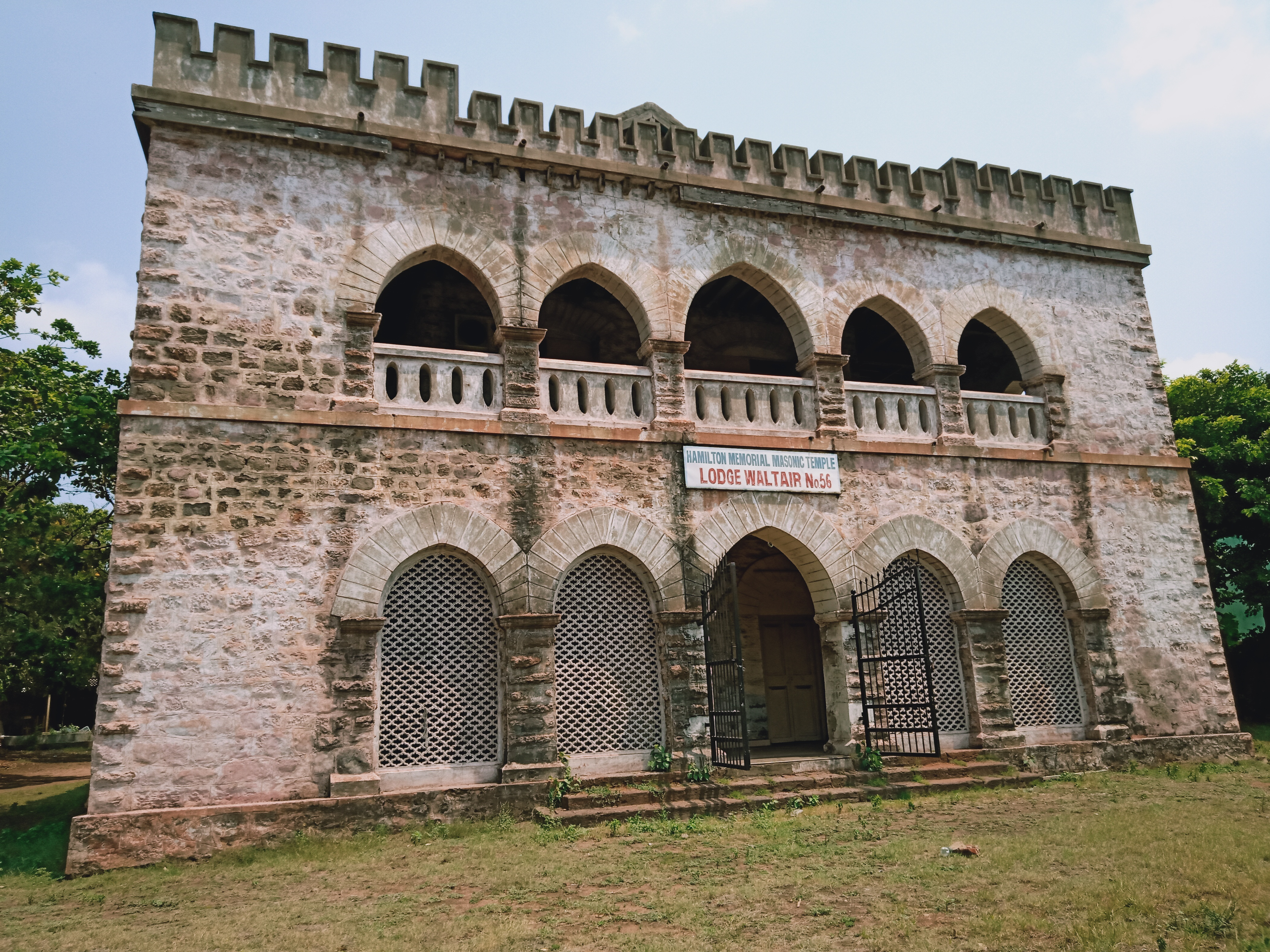
Hamilton Memorial Masonic Temple, Visakhapatnam

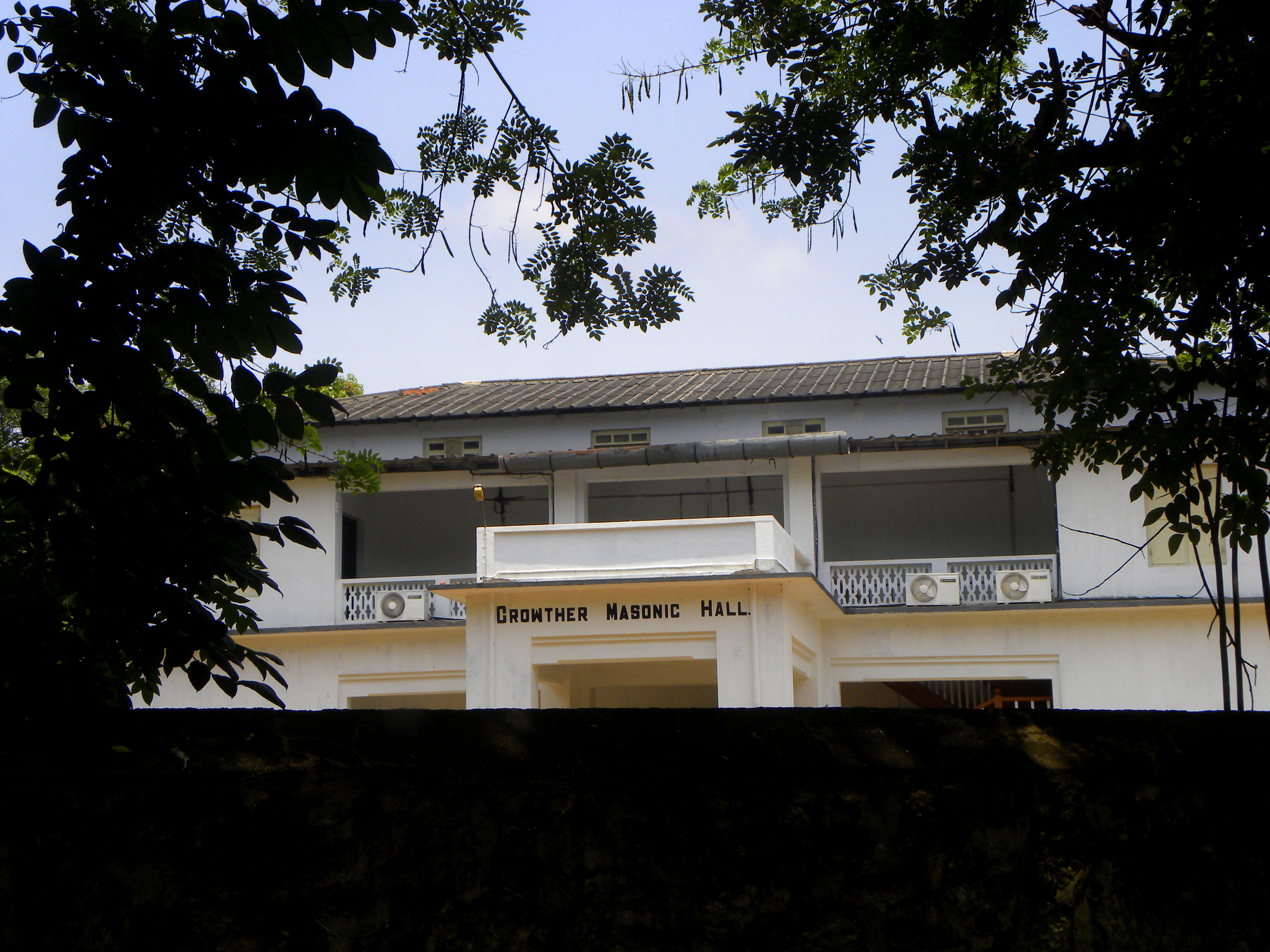
Crowther Masonic Hall, Kollam

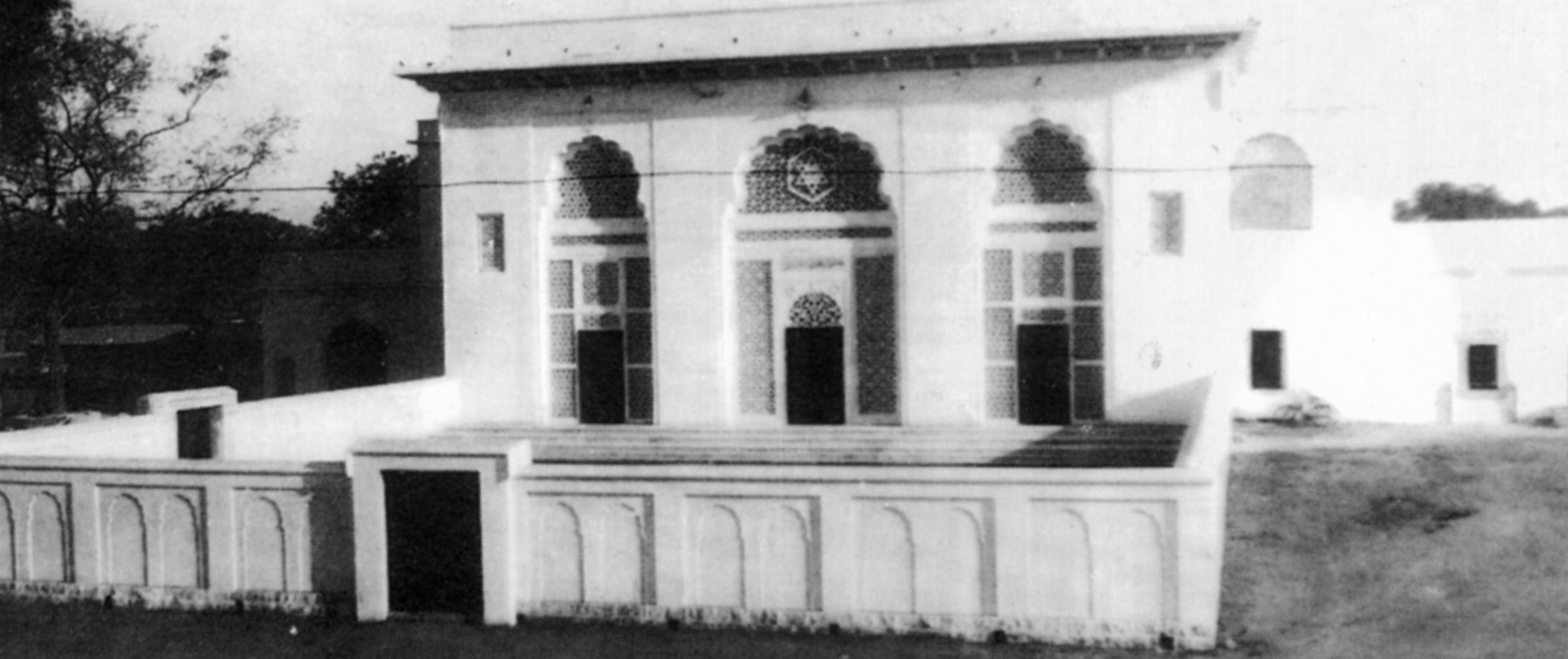
Gosha Mahal Baradari, Hyderabad

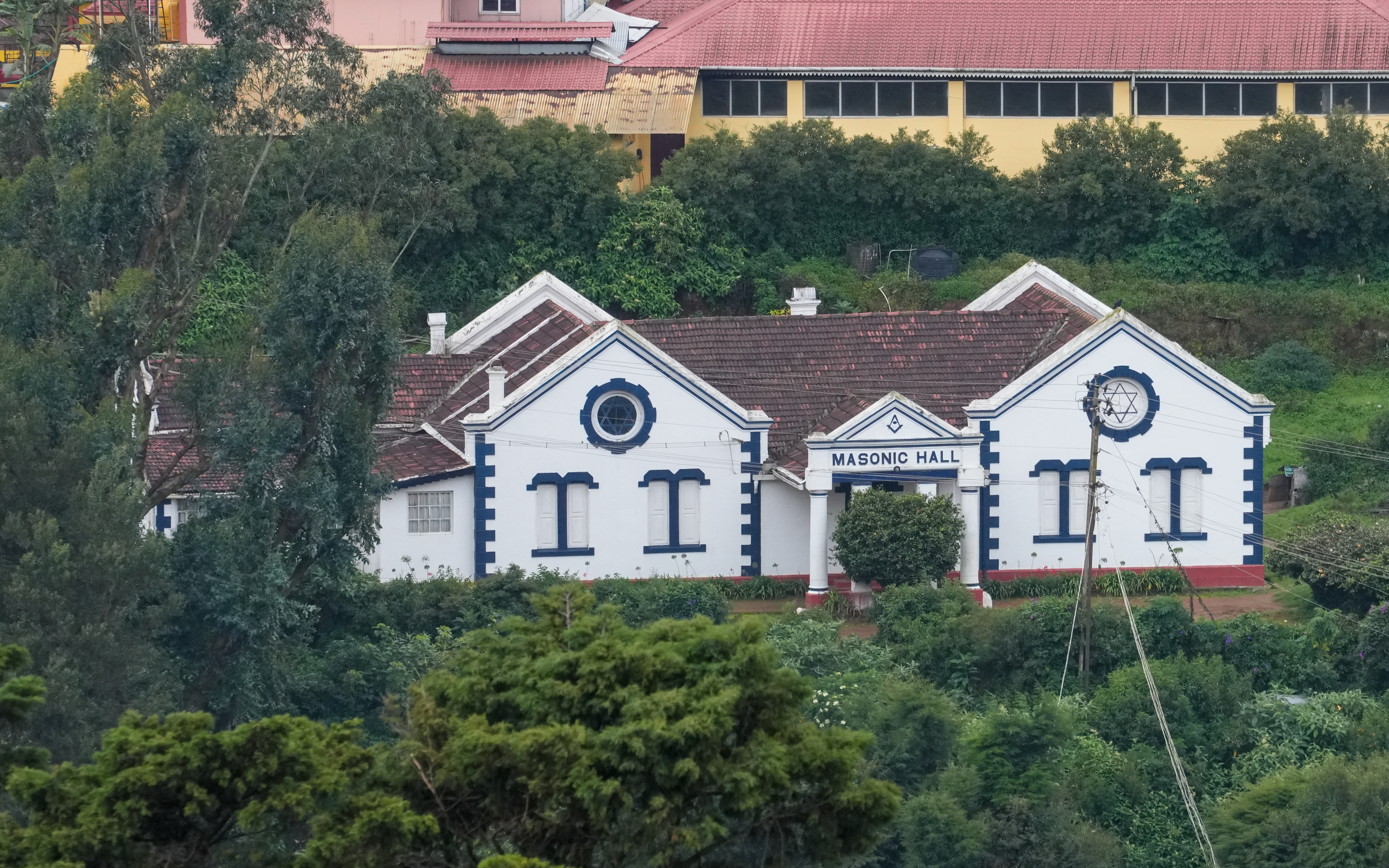
Masonic Hall (Anchor Of Hope Lodge No. 1093 EC), Nilgiris

== List of Lodges ==
Lodge Name	Lodge No.	Location	Date of Warrant
Lodge of Perfect Unanimity	150	Chennai	1786
Lodge of Rock	260	Chennai	1816
Lodge of Universal Charity	273	Chennai	1811
St. John's Lodge	434	Secunderabad	1822
Anchor of Hope Lodge	1093	Wellington	1866
Pitt Macdonald Lodge	1198	Chennai	1867
Lodge of Faith, Hope & Charity	1285	Ootacamund	1869
John Miller Lodge	1906	Chennai	1881
Kerala Lodge	2188	Calicut	1886
Lodge St. George	2532	Chennai	1894
Lodge Minchin	2710	Trivandrum	1897
Golconda Lodge	3249	Secunderabad	1907
Lodge of Southern Brotherhood	3311	Bangalore	1908
Lodge Ampthill	3682	Coimbatore	1913
Cauvery Lodge	3848	Thanjavur	1918
Lodge Cochin	4359	Cochin	1921
Archibald Campbell Lodge	4998	Chennai	1928
Lodge Quilon	5839	Quilon	1941

== See also ==
- United Grand Lodge of England
- District Grand Lodge of Bengal
- The St. John's (Secunderabad)
