= Lady Hydari Club =

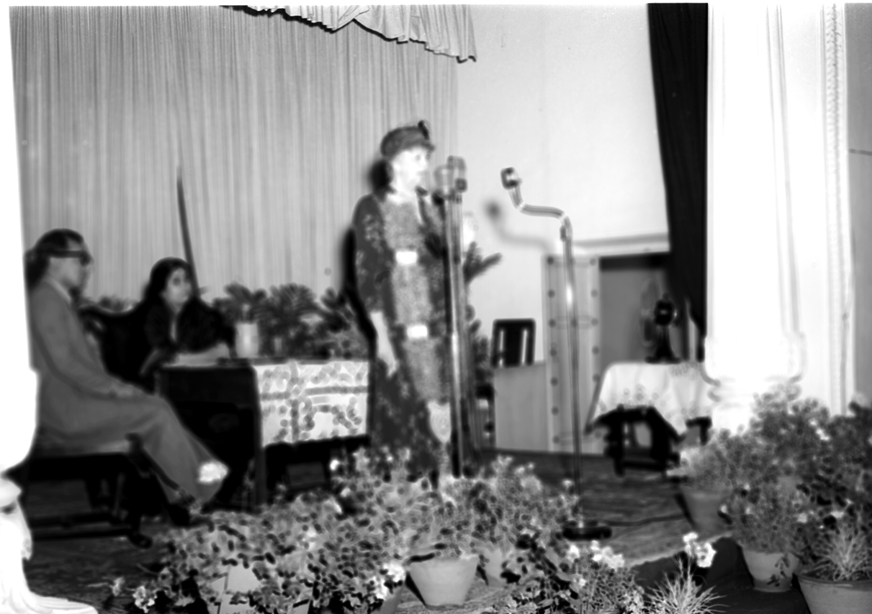
Eleanor Roosevelt speaking at the club in 1952

Lady Hydari Club was an elite club exclusive to women in the erstwhile Hyderabad state in India. It was located in what is now the Old Gandhi Medical College near Basheerbagh.

== History ==
The club was started in 1929 by Lady Amina Hydari so that women could play tennis and socialise. The club is named in commemoration of Lady Amina Hydari, wife of Sir Akbar Hydari, President of the Nizam's Executive Council, 1938–42. It was used by both elite Indian and British women and The Hyderabad Ladies' Association Club which was founded in 1901.

In 1952 there was a conference of social workers at the club. One of the speakers was Eleanor Roosevelt.

== The Club ==
The building was designed by Zain Yar Jung. It featured a special entrance which allowed veiled women (zenana) to be delivered by car and enter without being seen. The large entrance foyer opened out onto rooms and halls. Women could play Tambola, cards or badminton or take lessons in cooking or needlework. The club use to organize an annual tennis tournament for women. The club was at one time the fashionable location for weddings. The club once ran a school for the poor of the area and it had a library of Urdu, Telugu and English books.

== Present ==
The club building was annexed to be part of the Gandhi Medical College in 1986. The college felt that the space used by the club was too lavish and the club was obliged to allow the college to use it. In 2011 the club had 120 members but its buildings were in need of renovation.

== Notable members ==
- Amina Hydari, wife of Sir Akbar Hydari, Prime Minister of Hyderabad State
- Nilüfer Hanımsultan, an Ottoman princess who married Moazzam Jah, Nizam Mir Osman Ali Khan's son.
