= Nizam's Guaranteed State Railway =

Railways established by the Nizams of Hyderabad

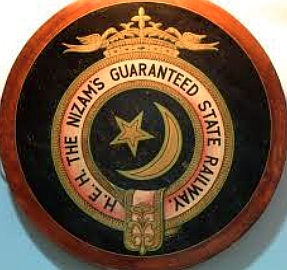

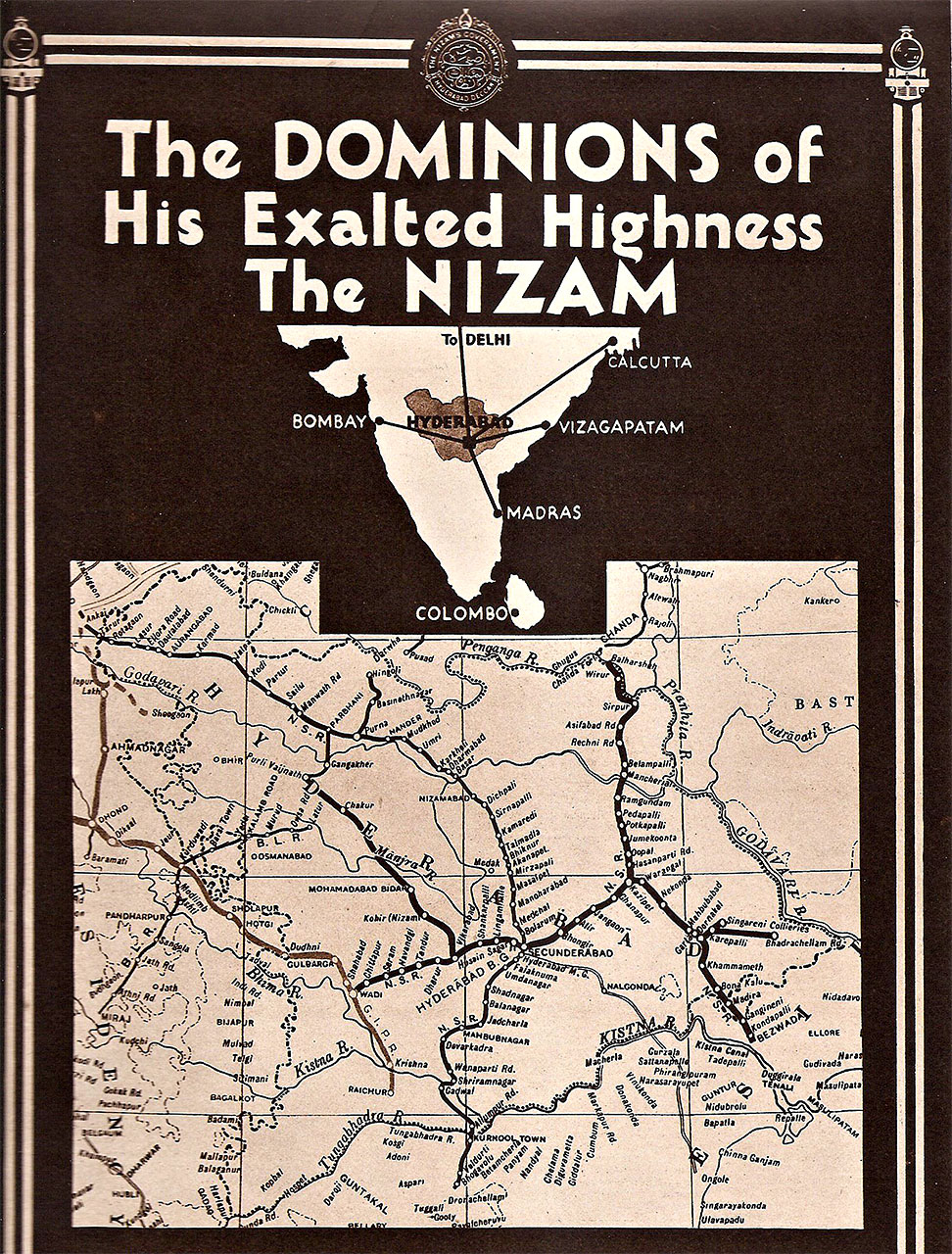
- Nizam State Railway map

Overview
- Headquarters: Secunderabad (1870–1916); London (1883–1941); Kachiguda (1916–1950)
- Locale: Hyderabad State, India
- Dates of operation: 1870 to 1883, fully owned by Nizam. Owned by Hyderabad State from 1930 to 1951.–1950 (nationalised and merged with Indian Railways)
- Predecessor: Nizam State Railways (1873–1883)
- Successor: Central Railway(1951); South Central Railway(1966)

Technical
- Track gauge: Broad gauge metre gauge
- Length: 351 miles (565 km) (1905); 688 miles (1,107 km) (1943); 2,351 kilometres (1,461 mi) (1951)

Nizam's Guaranteed State Railway (NGSR) was a railway company operating in India from 1883 to 1950. The company began with a line built privately by the HEH, the Nizam, which was owned and operated by the company under a guarantee from the Hyderabad State. Capital for the line was raised by issuing redeemable mortgage debentures. The Nizam's railway was eventually consolidated with the Hyderabad-Godavari Valley Railway (HGVR). In 1951, both the NGSR and the HGVR were nationalised and merged into Indian Railways.

== History ==
=== Nizam's State Railway ===
The GIPR line connecting Bombay with Madras had bypassed the Nizam's territories. The Britishers were interested in joining the GIPR line with Hyderabad and make the Nizam incur all the expenses and pay a guaranteed interest to GIPR. On 19 May 1870 an agreement was signed by Governor General Lord Mayo with the Nizams. As per this agreement, the new company would be owned by the Nizams and be known as Nizam's State Railway. The capital to set it up would be provided by the Nizam, but will be constructed and operated by Government of India through British Resident at Hyderabad. Hyderabad was connected to GIPR and a new line from Wadi to Secunderabad was finalised. The construction of 192 km (119 mi) line started on 25 March 1871 and was completed on 9 October 1874. The line was split at Begumpet with one going to Secunderabad and another line going to Hyderabad. The 140 kilometres (87 mi) line from Secunderabad to Warangal was opened on 8 April 1886. Later, starting from 1889, metre-gauge lines were laid from Manmad Junction railway station to Secunderabad, connecting Aurangabad, Jalna, Nanded and Nizamabad. Financial deterioration of NSR coupled with the need to extend the railways to Singareni to carry coal to the GIPR forced Salar Jung to seek funds in the London financial markets. Nizam State Railways was taken over by Morton, Rose & Co, a joint stock company based in London and renamed as Nizam's Guaranteed State Railway on 27 December 1883.

=== Nizam's Guaranteed State Railway ===
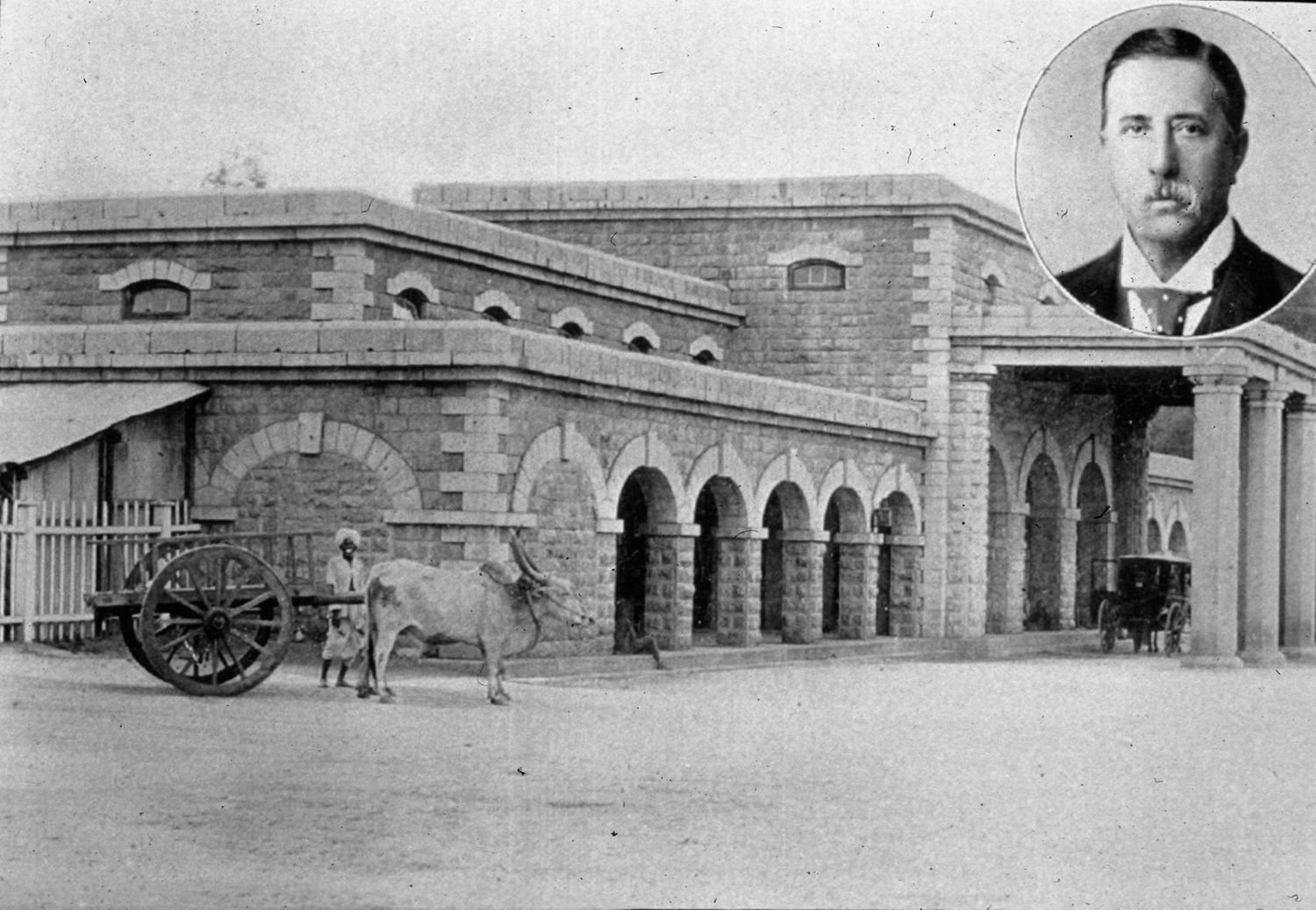
Secunderabad Railway Station (circa 1874)

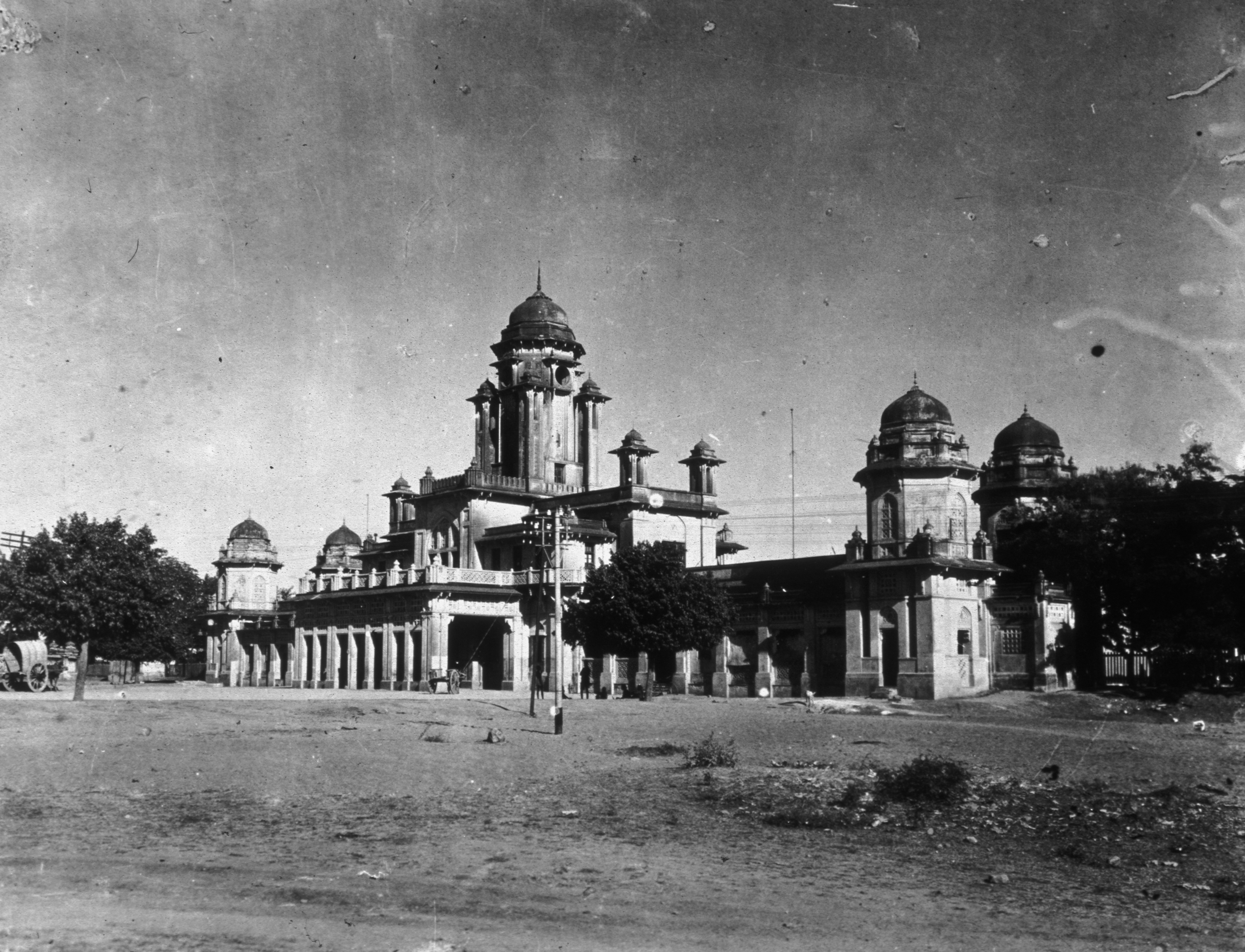
Kacheguda Railway Station (circa 1922)

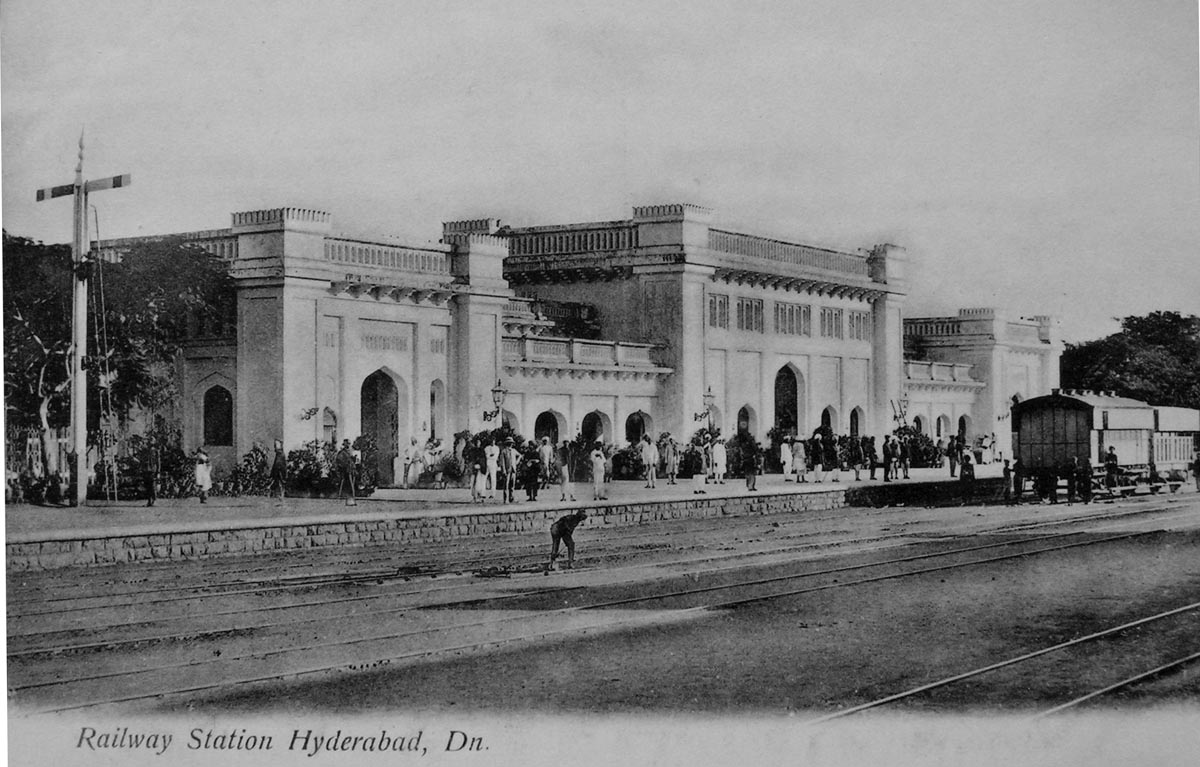
Hyderabad Deccan Railway Station (before 1905)

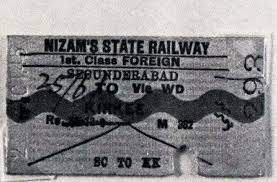
A copy of ticket issued by Nizam State Railways

Nizam's Guaranteed State Railway was formed on 27 December 1883 after the Nizam State Railways was taken over by Morton, Rose & Co. As per the agreement signed the Nizam's government had to deliver all existing railway lines free of all encumbrances to the newly formed company. The Nizams had to pay annuity for 20 years to the newly formed company. This company had ten directors out of whom only one was an Indian. The lone Indian member was Sardar Diler Jung Bahadur who was the Secretary of the Railways Department of Nizam's Government. On 1 April 1930 the NGSR was brought under the direct control of Hyderabad State with Sir Akbar Hydari as the president. The remaining members of the board of the nationalised company were Britishers and the headquarters of H. H. Nizam's State Railways remained at London. The office was relocated to Hyderabad on 1 November 1941, as the ongoing war was making it difficult to work over such a long distance. Hyderabad was integrated with India in 1948 and on 5 November 1951 NGSR, along with GIPR and some other small railway companies were merged to form Central Railways. On 2 October 1966, South Central Railway was carved out of Central Railway with areas of erstwhile NGSR under its jurisdiction and Kacheguda as its headquarters. At the time of merger, the total length of Nizam State Railway system was 2,351 kilometres (1,461 mi) and was the largest system in any princely State in India.

The proposal was for an initial railway line to be built from Secunderabad Railway Station in Hyderabad to Wadi Junction. Nizam agreed to fund the construction expenses for the initial line, leaving subsequent branches to be financed through a variety of means. Construction commenced in 1870, and the Secunderabad-Wadi Line was completed in 1874. Between 1874 and 1889, this line was extended to Kazipet and then to Vijayawada.

In 1879, the Nizam Mahbub Ali Khan, Asaf Jah VI took direct control of the company, integrating it into the state bureaucracy as the state-owned Nizam's Guaranteed State Railway. This partial-nationalisation was reversed in 1883 when a management company was formed to gradually take over the lines, under the provision of a guarantee from the government of HEH, the Nizam of Hyderabad State.

In 1899, the broad gauge connection between Bezwada (Vijayawada) and Madras (Chennai Central) opened, making rail travel between Hyderabad and Chennai possible. Railroad tracks in the state thus contained 467 miles (752 km) on the broad gauge, all built before 1891, and 391 miles (629 km) on the metre gauge, which were opened between 1899 and 1901. The total capital expenditure on the Nizam's State Railway at the end of 1904 was 4.3 crores. In that year, the net earnings were nearly 28 lakhs, or about 6 1/2 percent of the outlay.

In 1916, another railway terminus, Kachiguda Railway Station, was built to serve as the railway's headquarters. The Nizam's railway was then divided into various, directly owned subcorporations. Each had a head official appointed by the Nizam's Railway. The profits of these rail lines were distributed by the Nizam's Railway.

=== Hyderabad-Godavari Valley Railway ===
The Hyderabad-Godavari Valley Railway was a 1,000 mm (3 ft 3 3/8 in) gauge railway. John Wallace Pringle — who had recently completed surveying routes for the Uganda railway — was appointed as the superintending engineer in 1896. The railway opened in 1896, with a 391 miles (629 km) line from Hyderabad city to Manmad Junction. The railway eventually grew to 467 miles (752 km) of 5 ft 6 in (1,676 mm) gauge track and 391 miles (629 km) of 1,000 mm (3 ft 3 3/8 in) gauge track. The Hyderabad-Godavari Valley Railways cost 2.6 crores, and earned 7.7 lakhs net in the same year, or nearly 3 percent. In 1901 and 1902 the earnings were about 3 1/2 percent.

In the early twentieth century, the cotton industry held an important place in Nizam's Hyderabad Government as the largest export of Hyderabad State. In 1889, a cotton spinning mill and a weaving mill were erected in Aurangabad, employing a total of 700 people. In Jalna alone there were 9 cotton ginning factories and five cotton presses, with two more ginning factories at Aurangabad and Kannad. In 1901, the cotton presses and ginning factories employed a total of 1,016 people. The area of cultivated land under cotton in 1914 was three million acres (12,000 km^{2}), with most of the cotton being grown in the Marathwada districts, where the soil was particularly well suited to it.

=== Expansion of Cotton industry ===
The opening of the Hyderabad–Godavari Railway in October 1900 led to the growth of the cotton industry in the Nizamabad, Nander, Parbhani and Aurangabad Districts; the line was used to transport the heavy machinery needed to open ginning and pressing factories. Bombay buyers began to arrive in considerable numbers during the cotton season, which lasted from October to December. More land was turned over to growing cotton and machines replaced the traditional hand gins. Grain and pulses became more expensive, with much of the best land used for cotton farming, and Marathwada entered a critical period of its history.

According to a census report from the period: "The evolution from the agricultural to the manufacturing stage has already begun in Marathwada. When a country begins to produce the raw materials of manufacture in place of food crops, it has started on the road to industrialisation." There were three large spinning and weaving mills and about 90 small ginning and pressing factories in the State. In 1914 69,943 people were employed in cotton spinning, sizing, and 517,750 in weaving, cotton ginning, cleaning, and pressing. The wages paid were good, but the cost of living in Marathwara rose significantly due to the rise of the cotton industry, the uncertainty of rainfall, and availability of credit from money lenders.

== Railway lines ==
The following lines constituted Nizam's Railway:

- Bezwada Extension (34.5 miles (55.5 km)) opened in 1889
- Belharshah-Kazipet (234.5 miles (377.4 km)) opened in 1924
- Karipalli-Kothagudam (39.5 miles (63.6 km)) opened in 1927
- Vikarabad-parli vaijanath-parbhani (91 miles (146 km)) opened in 1930
- Purna Junction-Hingoli (miles) opened in 1912
- Secunderabad-British Frontier (188.2 miles (302.9 km)) opened in 1916
- Dhone Kurnool (cont. to Madras) (58.5 miles (94.1 km)) opened in 1909
- The Singareni coal fields were served by a branch line from Dornakal Junction covering a distance of 19 miles (31 km)

== Rail and Road Transport Department ==
In 1932, scheduled bus services – under the auspices of the railway administration – began with over 280 miles (450 km) of routes and 27 vehicles. Within a decade, bus service investments became a total expense of 7½ million HRs with nearly 500 vehicles servicing 4475 miles (7200 km) in routes. To coordinate transport policies, the Nizam's State developed a unified Rail and Road Transport Department. According to historian M.A. Nayeem, the functioning of the railways, roadways and airways under a single department was unique in the world. As a result, post-1948, Hyderabad State (later Andhra Pradesh) had a significantly superior bus network compared to the rest of India. Other Indian states such as Madhya Pradesh even bought used buses out of Andhra Pradesh. A four-lane highway has now replaced the Nizam-era road from Hyderabad through North India.

== Rolling stock ==
In 1936 the company owned 173 locomotives, 2 steam railcars, 266 coaches and 4192 goods wagons.

== Classification ==
It was labeled as a Class I railway according to Indian Railway Classification System of 1926.

== Merger and later ==
In 1950, the NGSR and HGVR were nationalised and in 1951 became part of Central Railway, a zone of Indian Railways. It was later re-zoned to South Central Railway, another zone of Indian Railways.

All the metre-gauge lines were gradually converted to the nationwide rail standard, 1,676 mm (5 ft 6 in) broad gauge, from 1992 to 2004.

== See also ==
- Deccan Queen (bus)
- Cyril Lloyd Jones
- Mir Osman Ali Khan
- Mir Mahbub Ali Khan
