= Muhammad Saleh Akbar Hydari =

Indian civil servant and politician (1894–1948)

Sir Muhammad Saleh Akbar Hydari KCIE CSI

Governor of Assam
- In office 4 May 1947 – 28 December 1948
- Preceded by: Henry Foley Knight (acting)
- Succeeded by: Ronald Francis Lodge (acting)

Personal details
- Born: 12 October 1894 British India
- Died: 28 December 1948 (aged 54) Waikhong, Manipur, Dominion of India
- Spouse: Sigrid Westling
- Relations: Tyabji family
- Parent(s): Akbar Hydari; Amina Hydari
- Occupation: Civil servant, politician

To be distinguished from his ancestor of the same name, Akbar Hydari.

Sir Muhammad Saleh Akbar Hydari KCIE, CSI (12 October 1894 – 28 December 1948) was an Indian civil servant and politician. He was the last British-appointed Governor of the province of Assam, who also continued in the role after Indian independence.

== Early life ==
Hydari was born to Amina and Sir Akbar Hydari, a Sulaimani Bohra Muslim family, on 12 October 1894. He was one of seven children. The lawyer and eminent Congressman Badruddin Tyabji was his granduncle. He completed his studies in Bombay and Oxford.

== Career ==
Hydari entered the Indian civil service in 1919, beginning his career in the Madras Presidency. In June 1924, he was appointed as an undersecretary in the Department of Education, Health and Lands of the Government of India. He then served as Agent to the Governor-General in Ceylon from October 1927 to June 1929 dealing with welfare and rights of the large Indian labour force in the plantations. After the creation of Imperial Council of Agricultural Research in 1929, he became its secretary.

Hydari, in the position of joint secretary to the delegation from the Indian princely states first and later as the adviser to the Hyderabad delegation led by his father, visited London for the Round Table Conferences. Speaking at the second conference on the state's behalf, he called for "work[ing] in harmony ... for the Greater and United India". On the discussions that followed the second conference, he was a member of the Federal Finance Committee and the Consultative Committee.

Subsequently, Hydari returned to the Department of Education, Health and Lands as its joint secretary and then served as the secretary of the Labour Department. During the early stages of World War II, he represented India on the Eastern Group Supply Council, a body set up to co-ordinate the build-up of supplies in the British colonies and dominions east of Suez. He was then placed on special duty in the Foreign Affairs Department. In 1945, he was appointed a member of the Viceroy's Executive Council and was given the charge of Information and Broadcasting Department. Upon the formation of an Interim Government of India in 1946, Hydari was given the charge of labour, works, mines, power, information and arts, and health.

In January 1947, he was appointed as the Governor of Assam, succeeding Sir Andrew Gourlay Clow. He took office on 4 May and he continued to hold the post following independence. With the Naga movement on during the time, in its demand for an independent State, Hydari signed a nine-point agreement with Naga National Convention in June that year.

== Personal life ==
Akbar Hydari married Sigrid Westling, a Swedish woman, and they had three children together: son and namesake Akbar Hydari III (1919–1998) and two daughters. His son, also called Akbar Hydari, was an industrialist and served as the Chairman of Western India Match Company (WIMCO) Ltd. from 1964 till the 1980s, later, as the director of Facit Asia and as the Honorary Swedish Consul in Madras.

== Death ==
Hydari died from a stroke on 28 December 1948 while on a visit to Manipur, in a dak bungalow at a village called Waikhong, 30 miles (48 km) away from Imphal. He was on a tour of Manipur with his wife and son; his tribal adviser N. K. Rustomjee and military secretary Major Dhamija. His body was carried in procession in a coffin draped in the National and Governor's flag to the cemetery of the Imphal Cantonment in the Kangla Palace. A three-day mourning was observed in Manipur.

Government offices
Preceded by Henry Foley Knight, acting	Governor of Assam; 1947–1948	Succeeded by Ronald Francis Lodge, acting
