= Amina Hydari =

Indian social worker

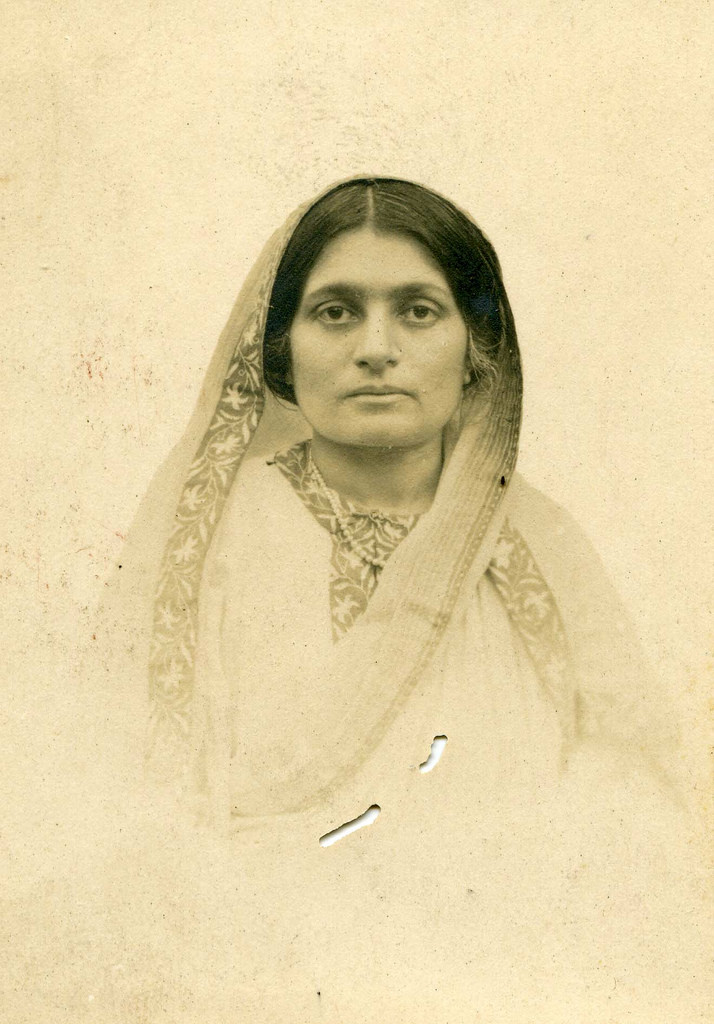
- Born: Amina Najmuddin Tyabji; 1878; Hyderabad, Hyderabad State, British India
- Died: 1939 (aged 60–61); Hyderabad, Hyderabad State, British India
- Occupation: Social worker
- Spouse: Akbar Hydari
- Children: 7; including Muhammad Saleh Akbar Hydari
- Relatives: Badruddin Tyabji (uncle)
- Family: Tyabji family

Amina Hydari (1878–1939) was an Indian social worker. In 1908, she received the Kaisar-i-Hind Medal, the first woman recipient, for her work during the Great Musi Flood of 1908. The wife of former Prime Minister of Kingdom of Hyderabad Akbar Hydari, she founded the Lady Hydari Club in 1929 and Mahboobia Girls School, the first girls' school in the State. Her uncle was the lawyer and congressman Badruddin Tyabji.

== Social life ==
She founded the Lady Hydari Club in 1929 exclusively for women.

== See also ==
- Akbar Hydari
- Aditi Rao Hydari
