= Deccan Queen (bus) =

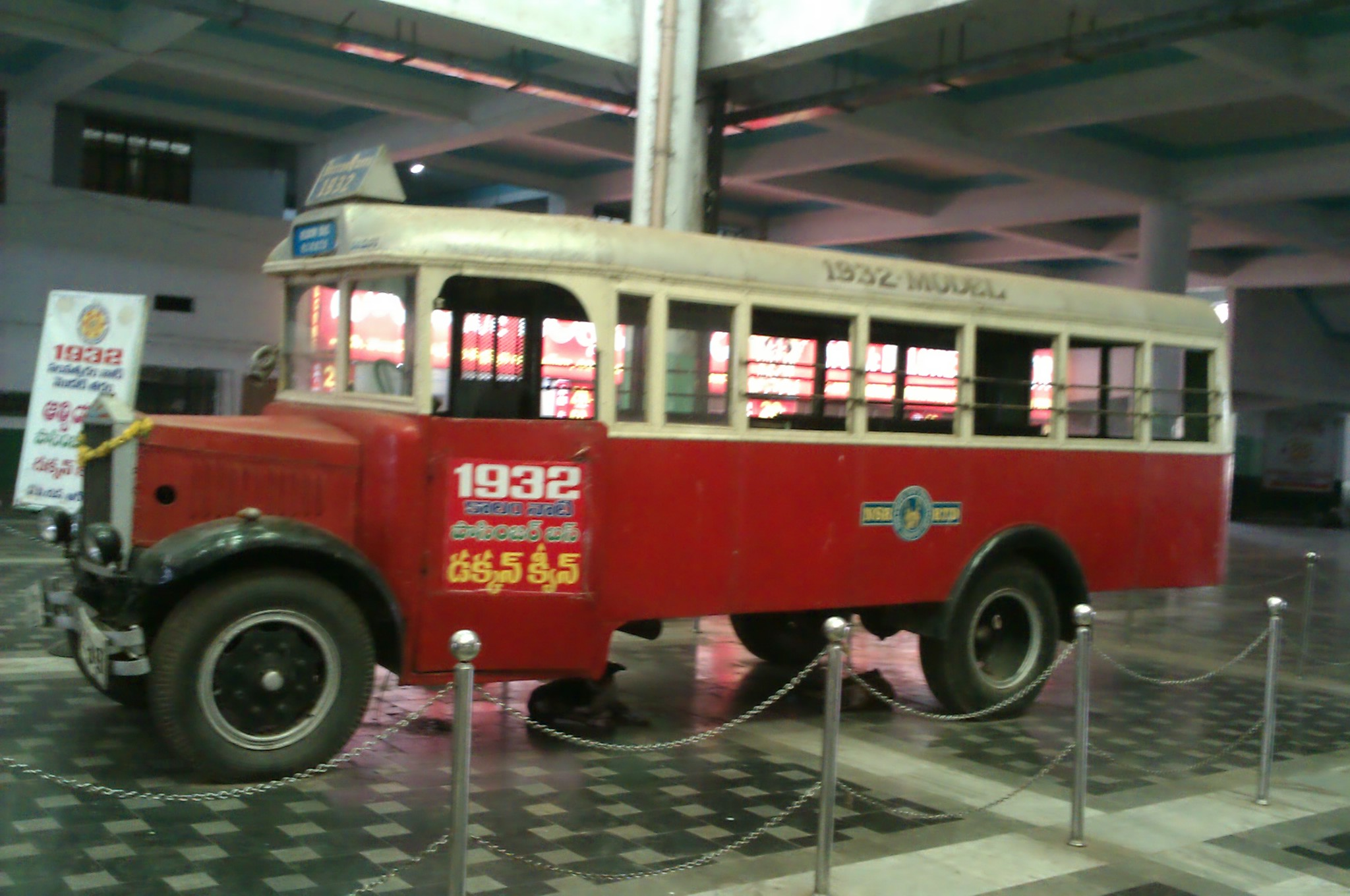
- The Deccan Queen bus at Vijayawada bus station

Overview
- Manufacturer: Albion Motors

Body and chassis
- Doors: 1
- Floor type: Step entrance

Powertrain
- Engine: Albion diesel engine

Dimensions
- Length: 19 seats

Deccan Queen is a 1932 model Albion vehicle run by the road transport division of Nizam's Guaranteed State Railway. Two of these buses still exist in India, one at Pandit Nehru bus station in Vijayawada, Andhra Pradesh and the other at Hyderabad, Telangana.

The bus, manufactured 85 years ago, is a heritage asset of Nizam State Rail and Road Transport Department (NSR-RTD). Till the early 1970s, the department used to run the 'Deccan Queen'. Along with 26 other Albion buses, it formed part of the Nizam's Guaranteed State Railway (NGSR). All of them had a seating capacity of 19 and were imported from London to cover the 400-km road network in the areas falling under the Hyderabad ruler's jurisdiction.

== See also ==
- Nizam's Guaranteed State Railway
