= Goshamahal Baradari =

Goshamahal Baradari (Freemasons' Hall)
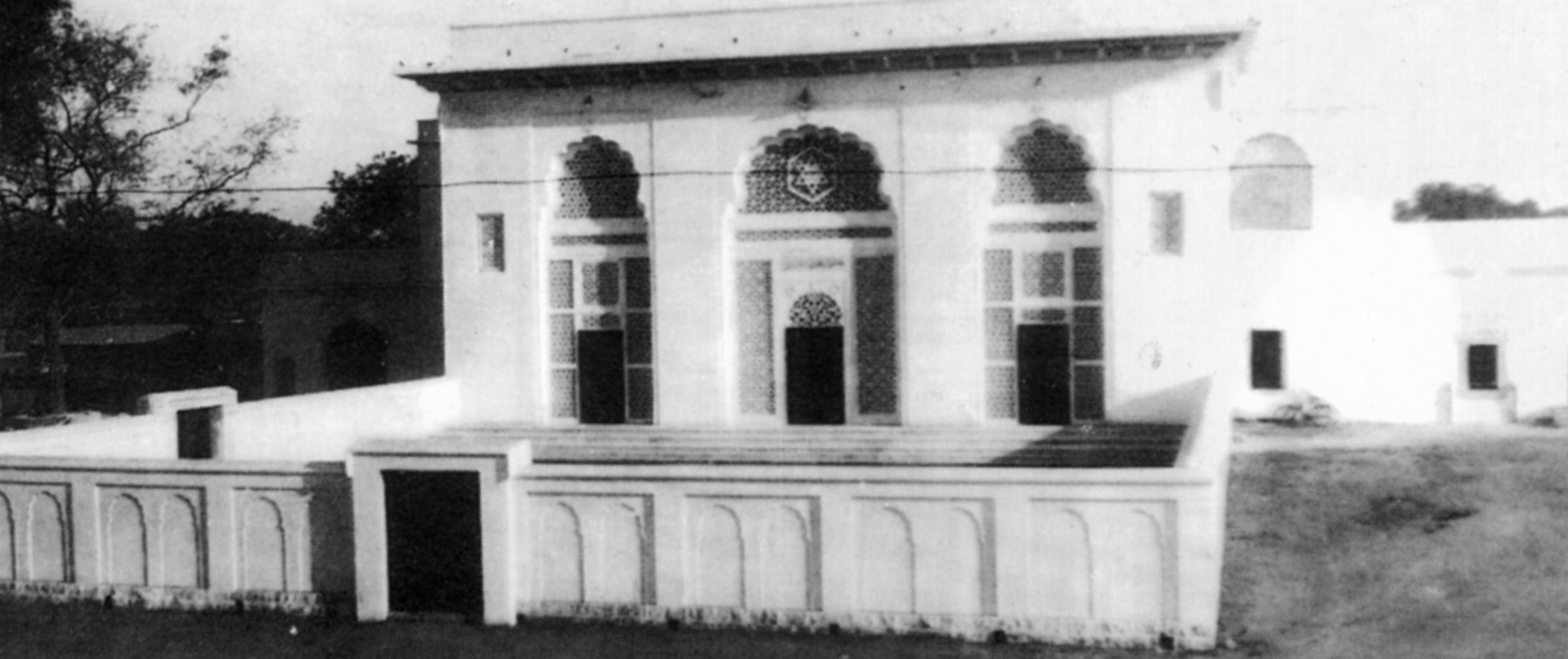
- Goshamahal Baradari, in 1920s
- Interactive map of the Goshamahal Baradari (Freemasons' Hall) area

General information
- Status: Completed
- Type: Baradari
- Architectural style: Qutb Shahi
- Location: 5-3-590 Goshamahal Road, Goshamahal, Nampally, Hyderabad, Telangana, India
- Coordinates: 17.3823°N 78.4703°E
- Completed: 1682 (344 years ago)

Technical details
- Size: 14,800 sq ft (1,370 m^{2})
- Lifts/elevators: 1

Goshamahal Baradari (Freemasons' Hall) is a building constructed in 1682 located in Goshamahal, a suburb of Hyderabad, India. It is a well-preserved baradari that originally served as a palace during the Qutb Shahi dynasty. It was donated for use as a Masonic hall in 1872 by the Nizam of Hyderabad, and has held the distinction of the oldest structure serving as an active masonic lodge in India since 1933.

The Goshamahal Baradari is considered by the Freemasons as a precious monument with its massive, majestic balustrades, walls adorned by portraits and photographs of Freemasons in their regalia and an equally lavish banquet hall, all being awe-inspiring sights. Now the oldest Masonic temple in the country, the Baradari has nine Masonic lodges and chapters meeting inside its imposing interiors. It is primary meeting place of freemasonry in Hyderabad alongside The St. John's (Secunderabad).

Freemasonry, said to be among the "world's oldest secular fraternal societies," is based on the "principles of fatherhood of God and the brotherhood of man" and has a member list that boasts of names like Justice Devender Gupta, several nawabs of the Nizam's era, Nawab Salar Jung Bahadur, Maharaja Sir Kishen Pershad, Raja Bahadur Venkatarama Reddy and several others. The walls of this building are adorned with portraits of many freemasons including the 7th Nizam - Mir Osman Ali Khan.

In 2015, an elevator was added to the structure's east wing.

== See also ==
- District Grand Lodge of Bengal
- Grand Lodge of India
- Freemasons Hall, Asansol
