= Cyril Lloyd Jones =

British railway engineer (1881–1981)

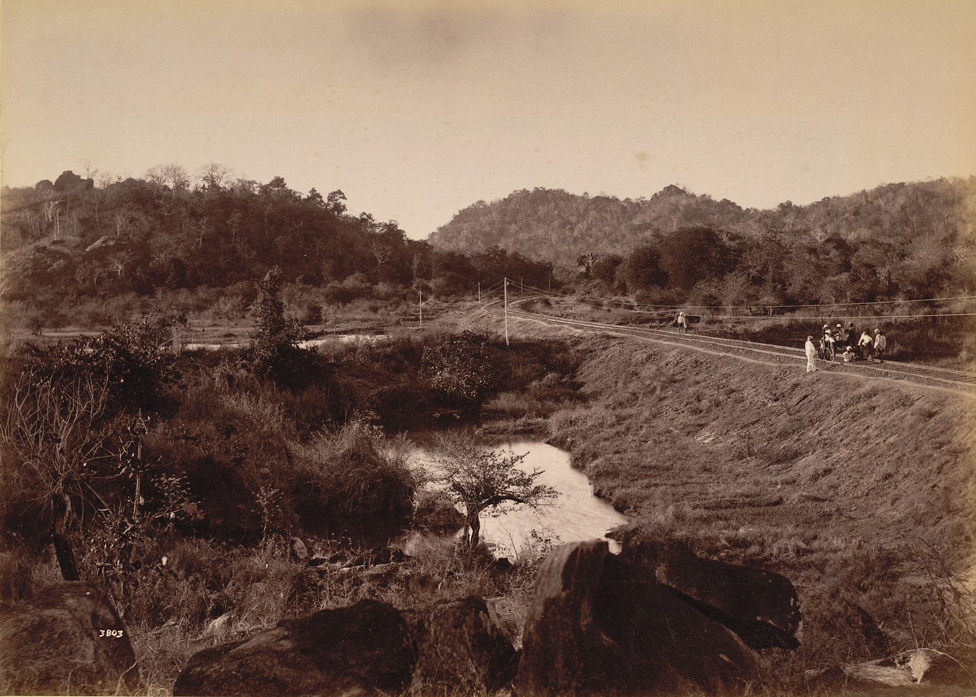
British engineers working at Hyderabad, for the Nizam's Guaranteed State Railway.

Cyril Walter Lloyd Jones CIE (6 March 1881, Wandsworth, London SW–10 July 1981, Surrey, England), was an early 20th-century British railway engineer who served in India.

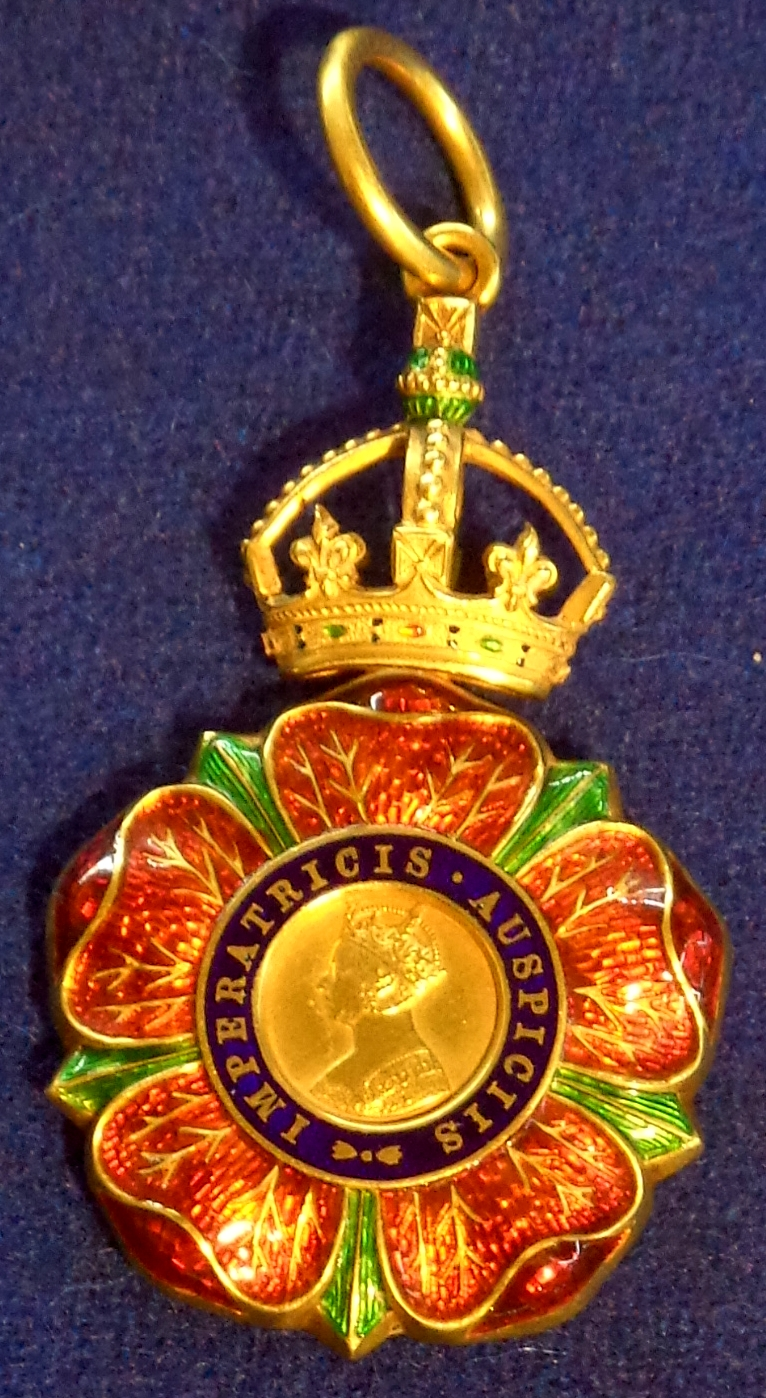
CIE insignia

== Life ==
The elder son of Richard Lloyd Jones, he was educated at Haberdashers' Aske's School and the Imperial College of Science in London, before joining the Nizam's State Railways (NSR) in 1904. Becoming HEH's chief engineer in 1913, then the NSR managing director by 1930, he retired in 1941.

In 1907, Lloyd Jones married Edith Penty, a cousin of Arthur Penty, having two sons a two daughters. His son, Michael Lloyd Jones, born in Secunderabad, was part of the Indian Civil Service and left India soon after independence.

In late 1920s, he served as Treasurer for St. John's Lodge No. 434, EC in Secunderabad.

== Honours and awards ==
- CIE (1925)
  - FCGI
  - FICE
