= The St. John's (Secunderabad) =

St. John's Freemasons' Hall & Masonic Temple
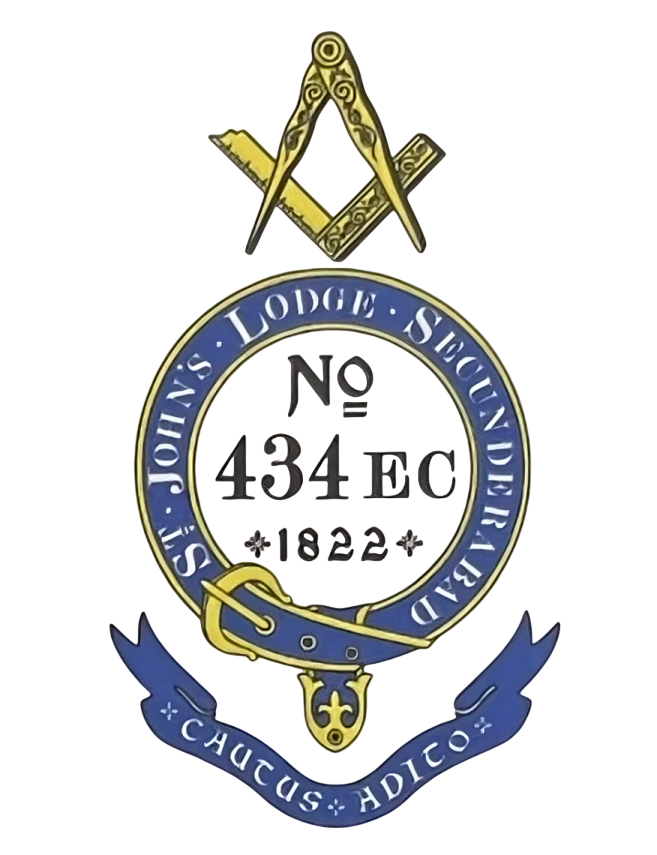
- Coat of arms of The St. John's Lodge, No. 434, EC
- Interactive map of the St. John's Freemasons' Hall & Masonic Temple area

General information
- Status: Completed
- Type: Masonic Hall
- Architectural style: Victorian
- Location: Lodge No. 434 EC, Opposite YWCA, West Marredpally, Secunderabad, Telangana, India - 500026, Secunderabad, Telangana, India
- Coordinates: 17°26′41″N 78°30′00″E
- Owner: St. John's Lodge No. 434 E.C.

Website
- www.stjohnslodge434.com

St. John's Freemasons' Hall & Masonic Temple also known as The St. John's, is a historic building located in West Marredpally, Secunderabad, Telangana, India, serving as a hub for Masonic activities in the region.

It is the primary meeting place of St. John's Lodge No. 434 EC. It has also been used by Golconda Lodge No. 3249 EC, Universal Peace No.1208 SC and other masonic lodges under the warrant of the Grand Lodge of India

== History ==
St. John's Lodge No. 434 EC was founded on 16 August 1822 by British military officers stationed in the Secunderabad Cantonment, a key base for the East India Company. The foundation stone of the building was laid on 11 March 1824. The lodge gets its name from St. John's Church, located about a kilometer away.

Formally constituted in 1836 under the English Constitution, the lodge provided a space for officers to practice Freemasonry, fostering brotherhood and philanthropy. Its establishment reflects the cultural influence of the British military and its enduring legacy in Secunderabad.

There was a story that it had originally been a church. Later, when the current St. John's Church was built about a quarter mile away, the old building was given to the Freemasons by the contractor.

Six chairs now used by the Past Masters originally came from the Brighton Royal Pavilion and were sent to the British Residency at Chudderghat in the early 19th century. Though there's no official record, six were likely gifted to the Lodge. Richly gilt but lacking in taste and comfort, the chairs hold more historical value than practical use.

On September 7, 1850, a proposal was made to nominate two prominent Muslim noblemen—the newly appointed Minister of Hyderabad and his nephew, Salar Jung I, but it failed due to a royal order restricting the Minister’s movement. Since Lodge meetings were held in Secunderabad, outside Hyderabad city, the Minister could not attend without special permission.

== Activities ==
Many prominent members of the region, both British and Indian alike, have been part of the lodge, many of whose descendants as far from the British Isles still continue to visit the lodge.

Most members of the St. John's Lodge have also been members of the Secunderabad Club. It is primary meeting place of freemasonry in Secunderabad alongside Goshamahal Baradari.

== Gallery ==
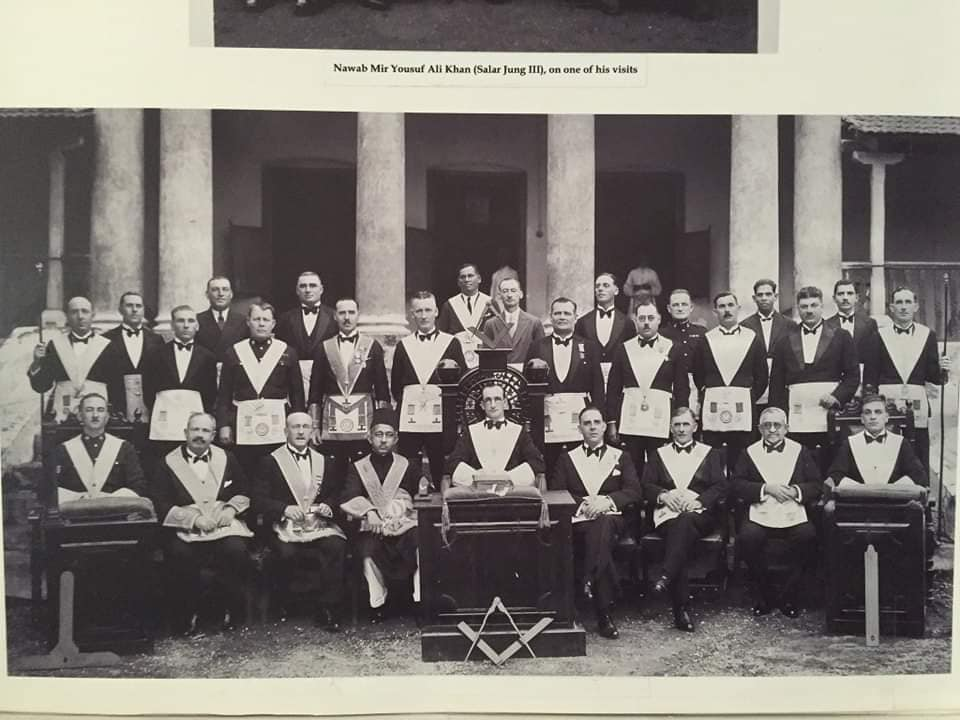
Nawab Mir Yousuf Ali Khan, Salar Jung III and Sir Akbar Hydari seen outside the St. John's.

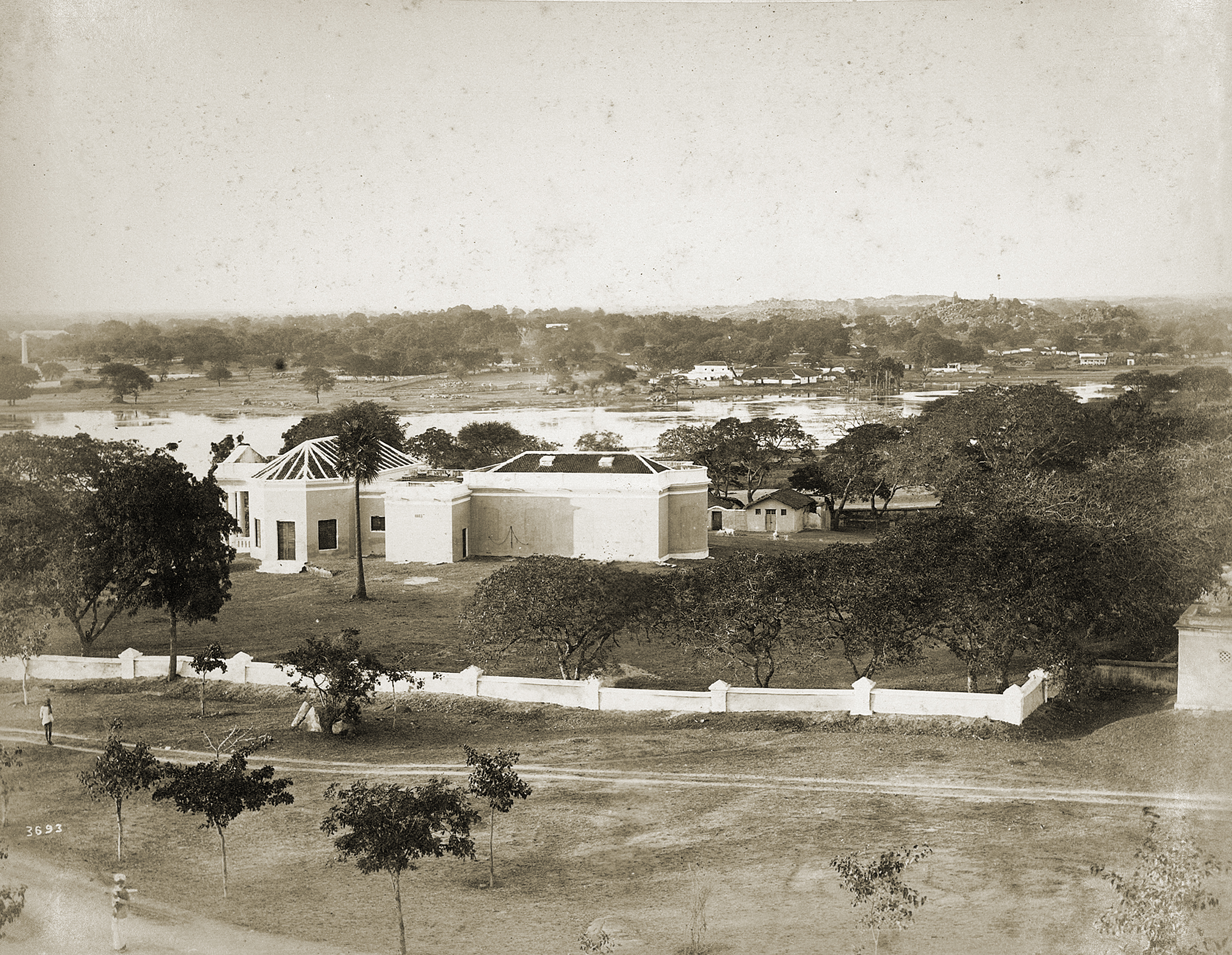
The St. John's photographed by Lala Deen Dayal, c. 1890s

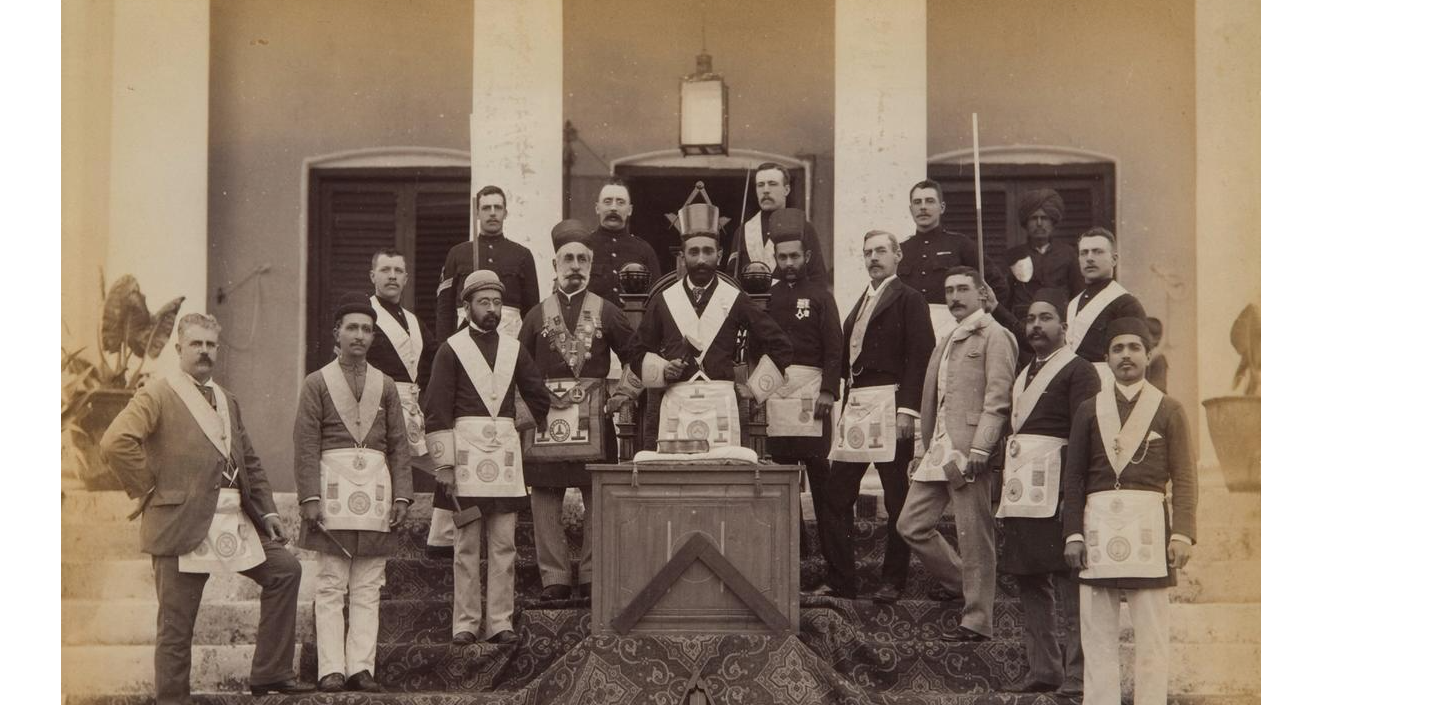
Members of the Lodge, Asian Art Museum collection.

== Notable people ==
St. John Lodge No. 434 E.C.

- Lt-Col James Oliphant
- Cyril Walter Lloyd Jones, CIE
- Surgeon-Major Edward Lawrie
- Nawab Syed Hussain Bilgrami, CSI
- Washington Teasdale
- William Thomas Marshall, VC
- John Berryman, VC
- Francis Douglas Lumley
- De Renzie Brett
- Sir Charles Wentworth Burdett, 6th Baronet
- Sir Charles John Oswald FitzGerald, K.C.B.
- General. Sir Thomas Astley Cubitt, K.C.B., C.M.G., D.S.O.
- Major-General Francis Neville Mitchell, CB, CBE, DSO
- The Hon'ble Montagu Henry Mostyn
- William Campbell Maclean
- Major-General Sir Ralph Bignell Ainsworth, CB, DSO, OBE, KStJ
- Major-General Henry Richard Abadie, CB
- John Maxwell Heron-Maxwell, MP

Golconda Lodge No. 3249 E.C.

- Nawab Mir Yousuf Ali Khan, Salar Jung III, KCIE
- Sir Akbar Hydari, Kt., PC
- K. P. S. Menon, CIE ICS
- Lt-Col Richard Gilbert Lees OBE, Father of Richard Flanagan

Ekram Lodge 756 S.C.

- Brig-General Sir Terence Humphrey Keyes, KCIE, CSI, CMG

Mayo Lodge No. 1406 E.C.

- Arthur Henderson VC, MC
