= St. John's Church, Secunderabad =

Historic building in Hyderabad, India

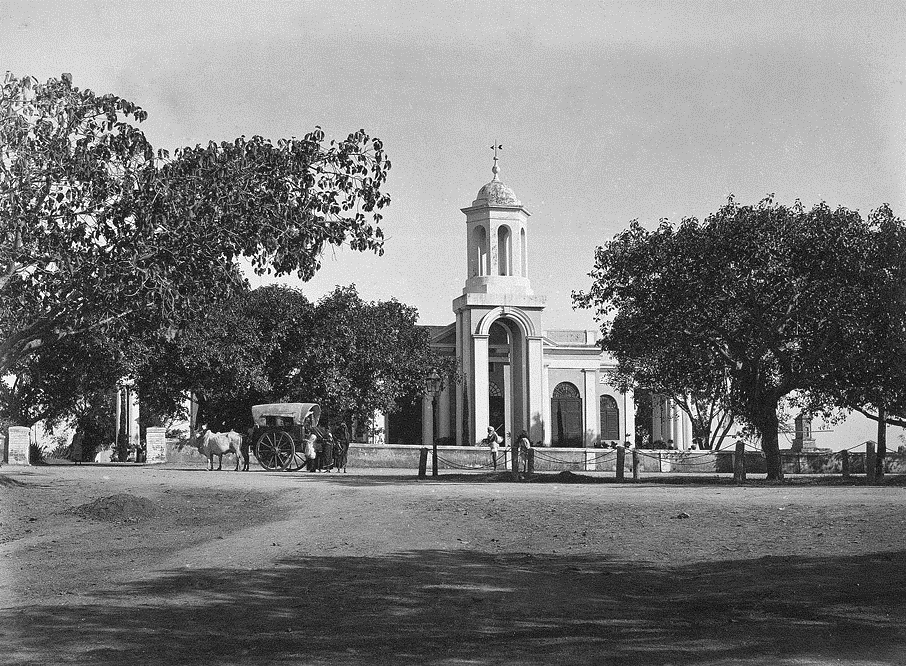
- St. John's Church photographed by Lala Deen Dayal, c. 1880s

Religion
- Affiliation: Christianity

Location
- Location: Hyderabad, Telangana, India
- Interactive map of St. John's Church, Secunderabad

Architecture
- Completed: 1818

St. John's Church, Secunderabad is a historic building, built in 1813, in Marredpalli, Secunderabad. It is the oldest Christian church in Hyderabad.

== History ==
The church was built for British troops of the Secunderabad cantonment. British troops were allowed to bring guns inside, after guns kept outside were stolen once during the 1857 War of Indian Independence.

The St. John's Masonic Lodge, located about a kilometer away, is named after the church. Many repairs and important construction projects of the church, including mosaic pavements, were funded by the Freemasons of Lodge St. John's No. 434 EC.

It was designated as a Heritage structure of Hyderabad in 1998.
