= Freemasons Hall, Asansol =

- Asansol Masonic Lodge
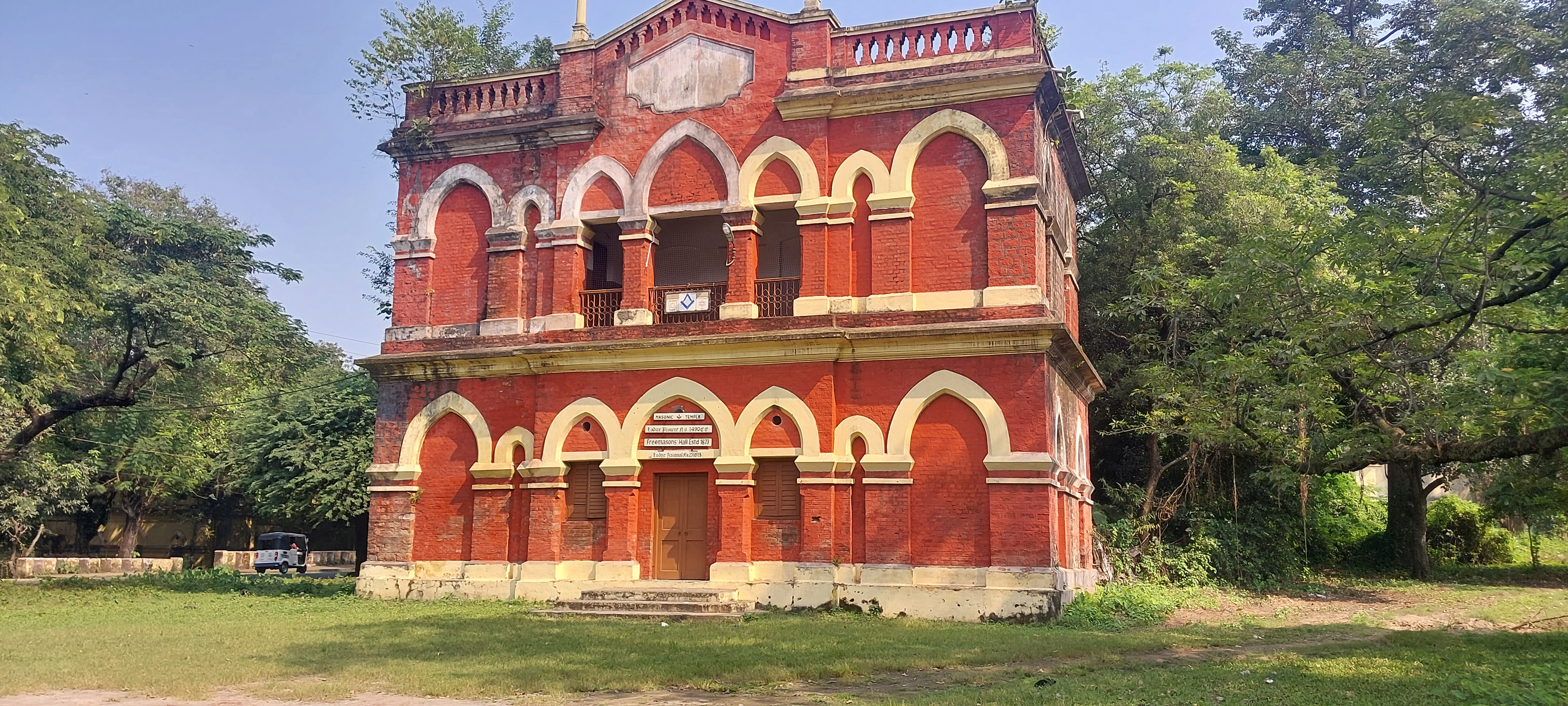
- Freemasons Hall in Asansol

General information
- Location: Asansol, Paschim Bardhaman district, West Bengal, India
- Current tenants: Freemasonry
- Completed: 1874
- Opened: 1873
- Owner: Lodge Pioneer

Freemasons Hall, Asansol is a historic Masonic hall located in Asansol, Paschim Bardhaman district in the Indian state of West Bengal.

== History ==
Asansol Freemasons Hall was established in 1873 in Gothic architectural style. The hall was founded on land of the East Indian Railway company during the rapid expansion of Asansol as an important railway and coal-mining centre in British India. The building became the home of Lodge Pioneer, which was registered as Lodge No. 1490. The building has been recognised as a heritage structure by the Eastern Railway.

== Gallery ==
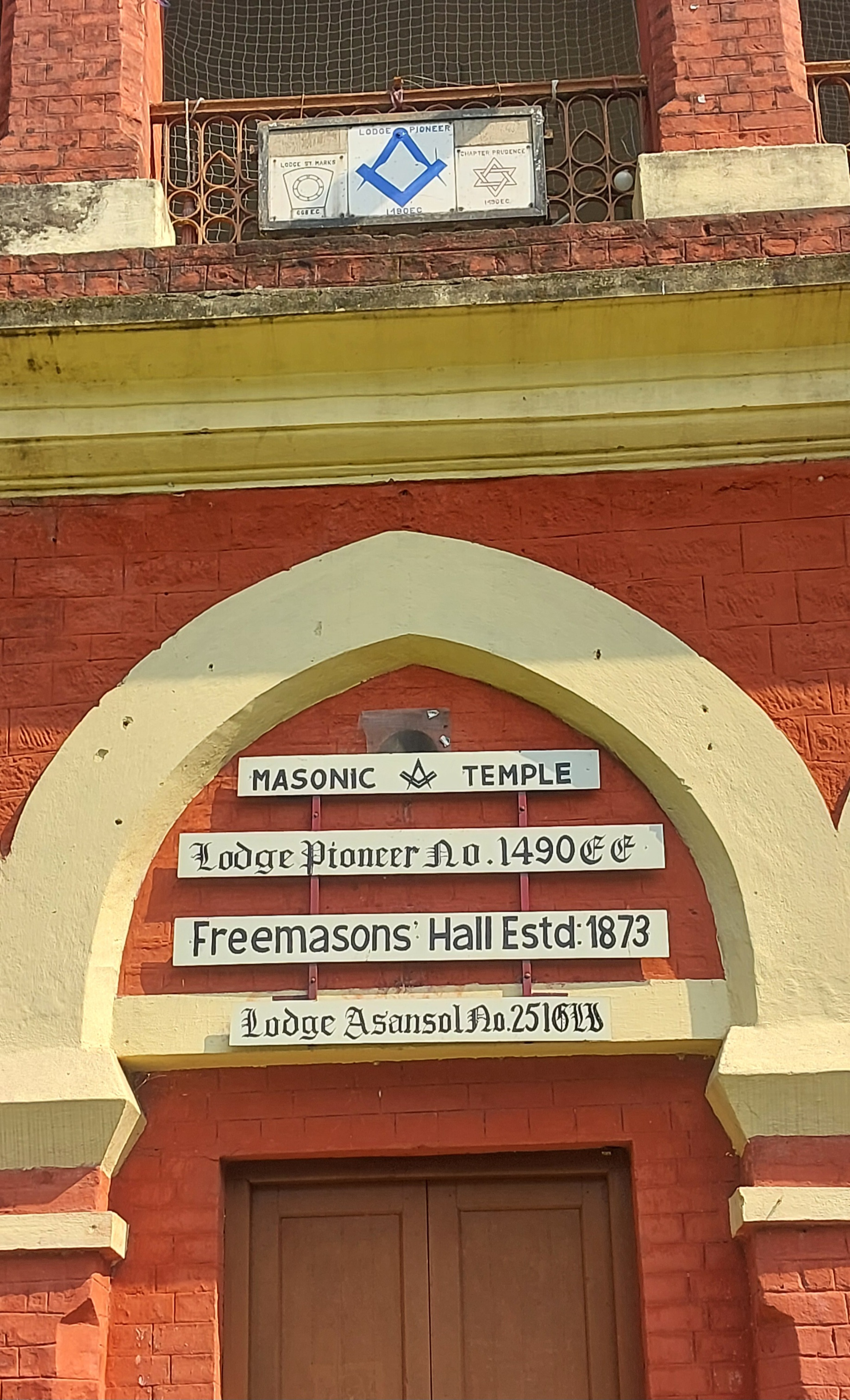

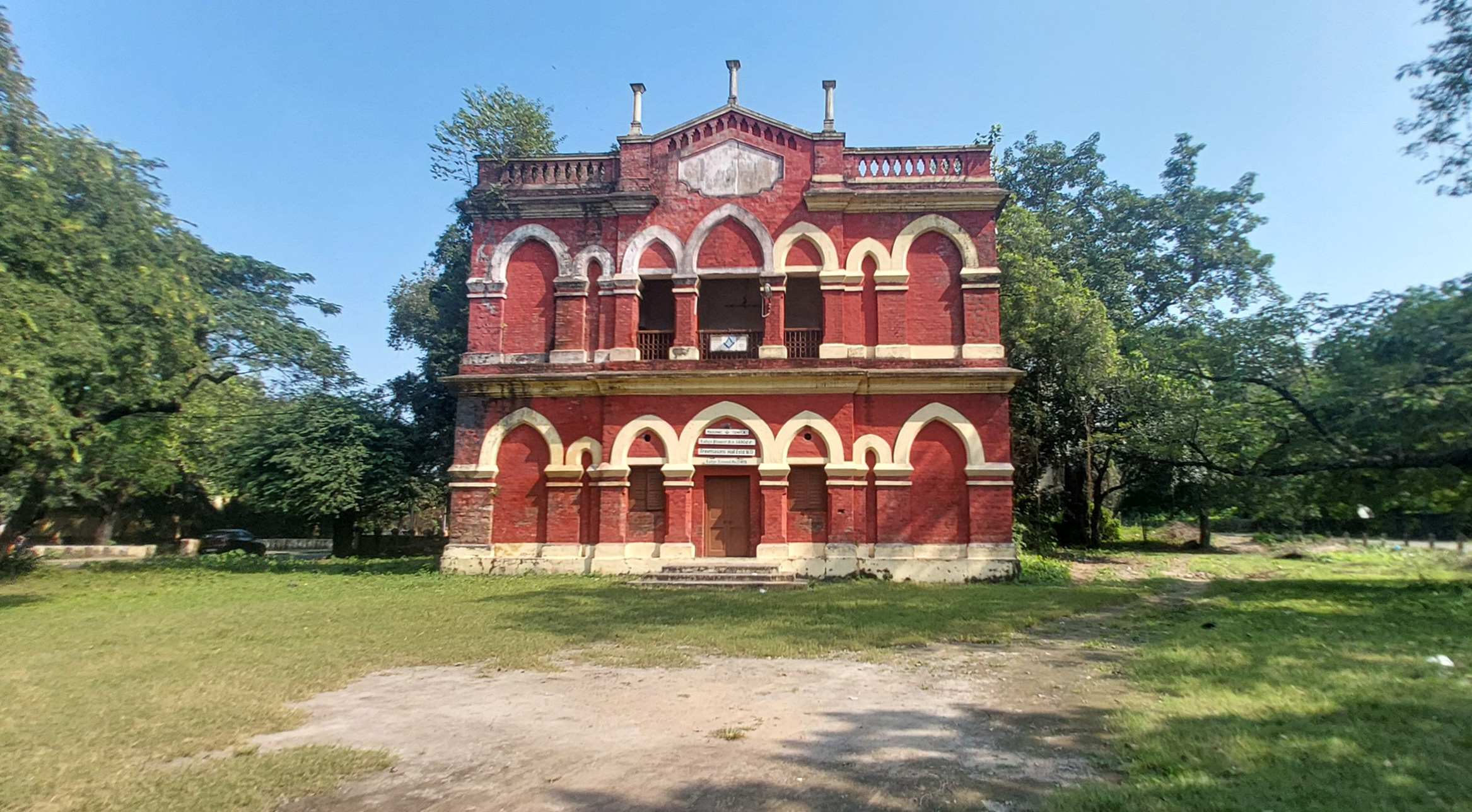

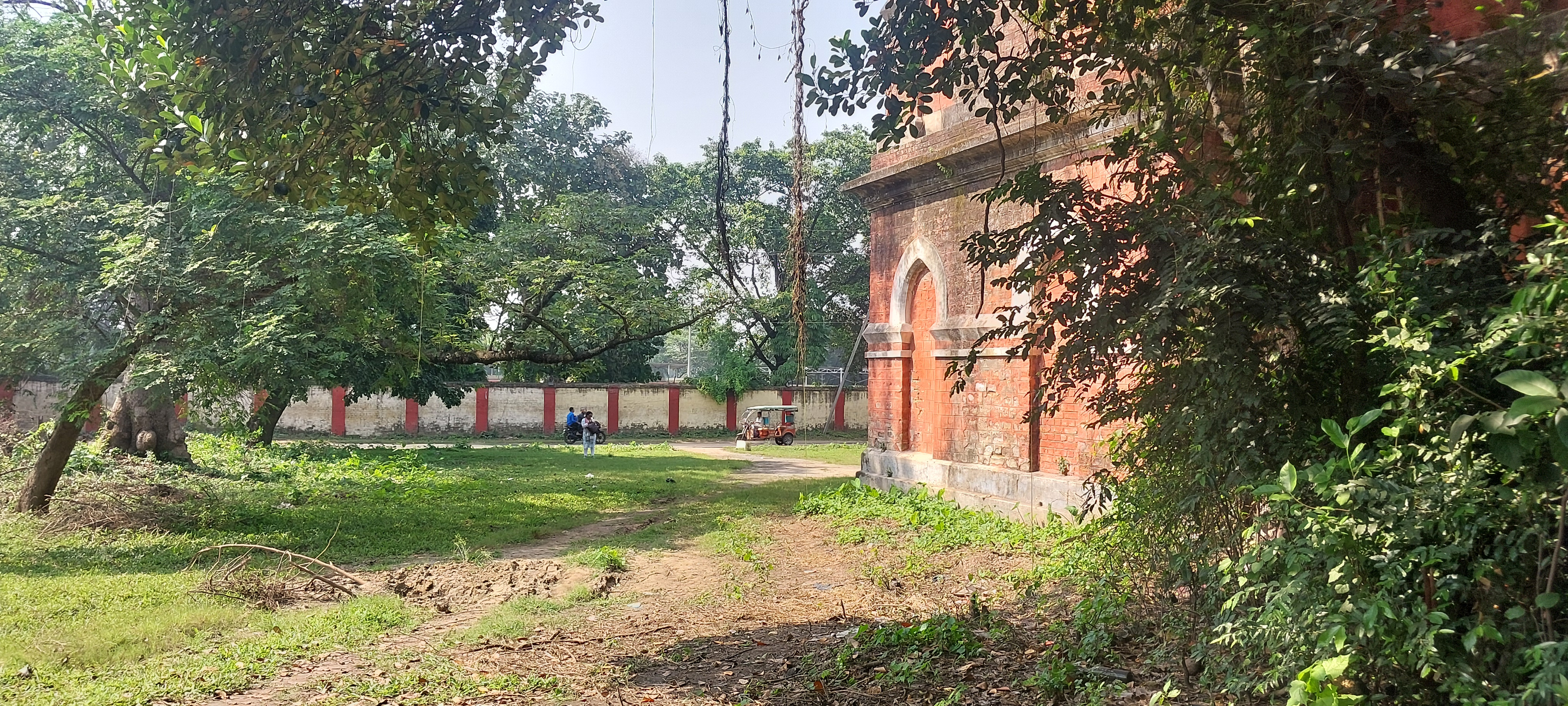

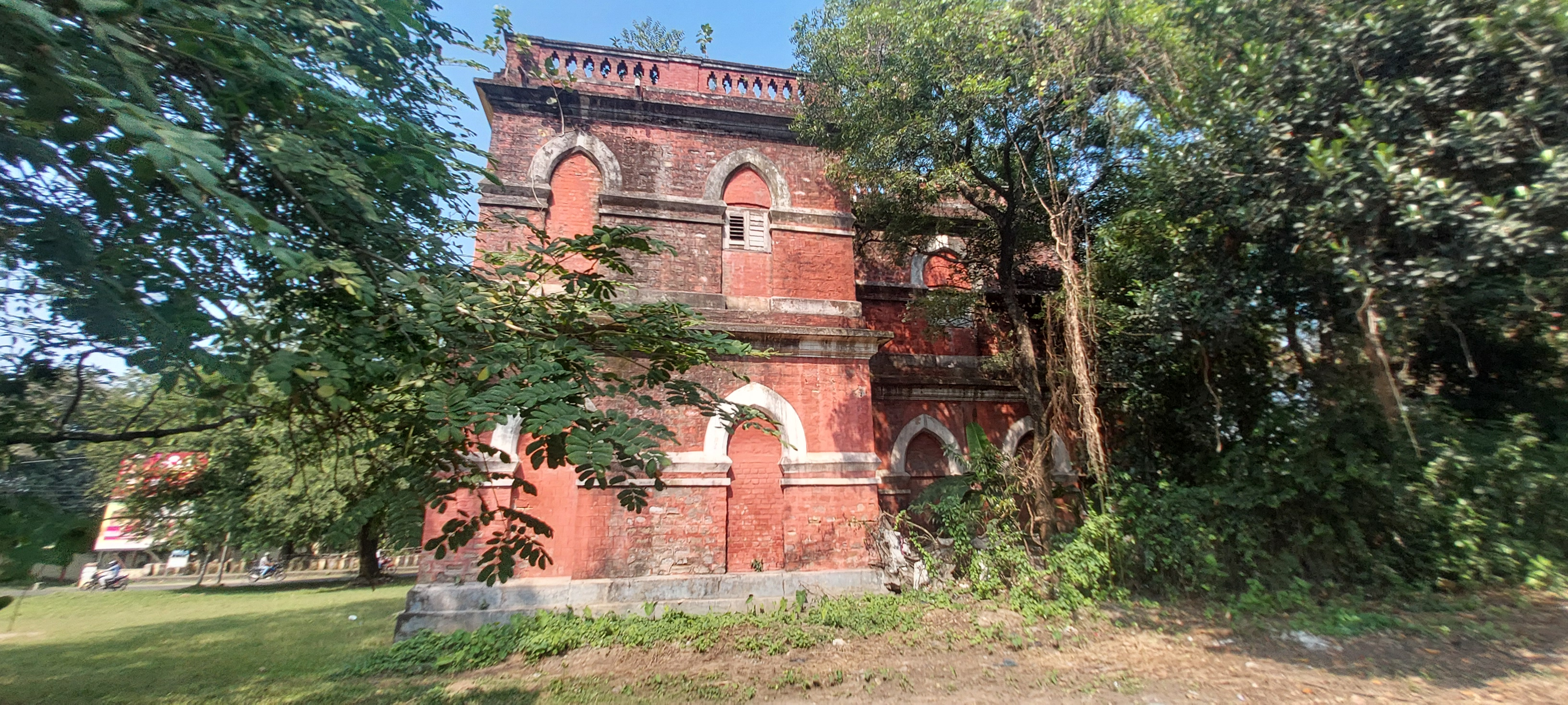

== See more ==
- District Grand Lodge of Bengal
- Grand Lodge of India
- Goshamahal Baradari
