= Grand Lodge of India =

Governing body of Freemasonry in India

The Grand Lodge of India (GLI) is the main governing body of Freemasonry within India, it was officially constituted on Friday 24 November 1961.

There were three delegations from the Grand Lodge of Scotland, Grand Lodge of Ireland and Grand Lodge of England in that order.

Out of a total of 277 individual Lodges in India already existing at the time, 145 opted for the new Grand Lodge of India. This represented a little over 52 per cent of the Warranted Lodges in India.

== Advent of Freemasonry in India ==
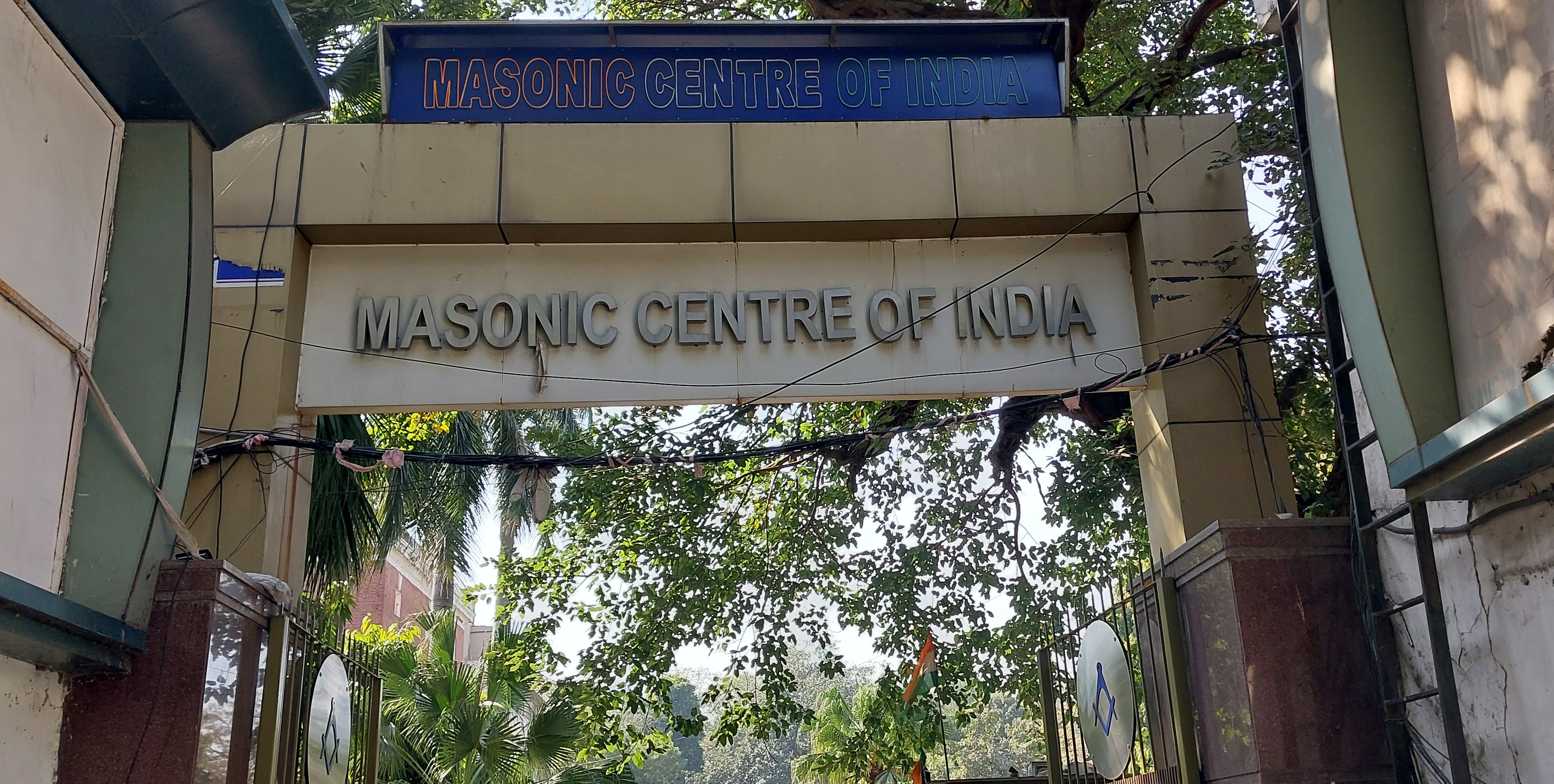
Masonic Centre Headquarter in New Delhi.

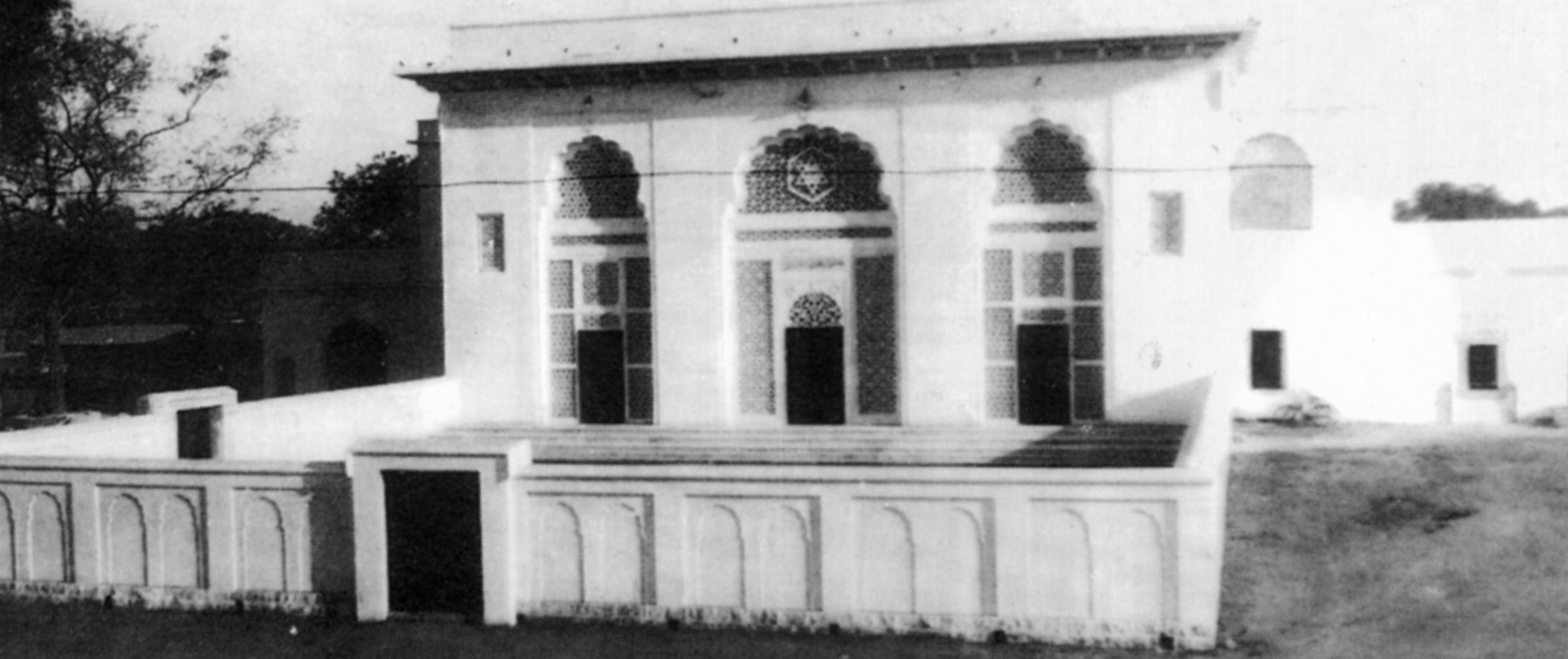
Goshamal Baradari, Hyderabad, circa 1920

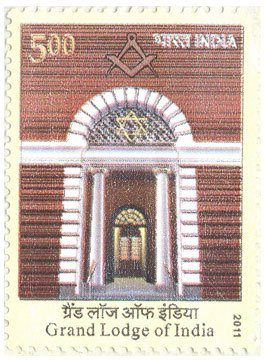
Commemorative stamp issued by the Department of Posts to mark the Golden Jubilee of the Grand Lodge of India (1961–2011)

Freemasonry traces its roots in India in the early years of the 18th century. The history of Freemasonry in India dates back to 1729 when the first Provincial Grand Lodge was established in Fort William, Calcutta, under the authority of the Grand Lodge of England. This development occurred just 12 years after the constitution of the Premier Grand Lodge of England in 1717. By 1730, officers of the East India Company held their meetings in Fort William in Calcutta. The number given to the Lodge was 72. The establishment of Freemasonry in India coincided with the expansion of British influence through the East India Company, although Lodges under other European Grand Lodges were also present, albeit in fewer numbers.

By the late 18th and early 19th centuries, over 100 lodges were operational in India, most of which were warranted under the Grand Lodges of England, Scotland, and Ireland.

Several notable historical figures were associated with Freemasonry in India, including military leaders such as Lord Nelson, Sir Charles Napier, and Lord Kitchener of Khartoum. There are also historical records suggesting that Tipu Sultan, the ruler of Mysore, was affiliated with the fraternity. In the 19th and early 20th centuries, many Indian leaders and intellectuals, including Swami Vivekananda (Narendra Nath Dutt), Motilal Nehru, C. Rajagopalachari, Sir C.P. Ramaswamy Iyer, and Fakhruddin Ali Ahmed, were known to have been members of various Masonic lodges.

Following India's independence in 1947, the number of lodges declined due to the withdrawal of the British. However, in 1961, the Grand Lodge of India was officially constituted at Ashoka Hotel, New Delhi. The ceremony was attended by representatives from the Grand Lodges of Scotland, Ireland, and England, along with Masonic dignitaries from other countries. Major General Dr. Sir Syed Raza Ali Khan, the Nawab of Rampur, was installed as the first Grand Master of the Grand Lodge of India. Initially, 145 of the 277 existing lodges in India chose to align with the newly established Grand Lodge, while others remained affiliated with their original parent Grand Lodges.

The Grand Lodge of India established four Regional Grand Lodges to oversee Masonic activity in different parts of the country:

- Regional Grand Lodge of Northern India (headquartered in New Delhi)
- Regional Grand Lodge of Eastern India (headquartered in Kolkata)
- Regional Grand Lodge of Western India (headquartered in Mumbai)
- Regional Grand Lodge of Southern India (headquartered in Chennai)

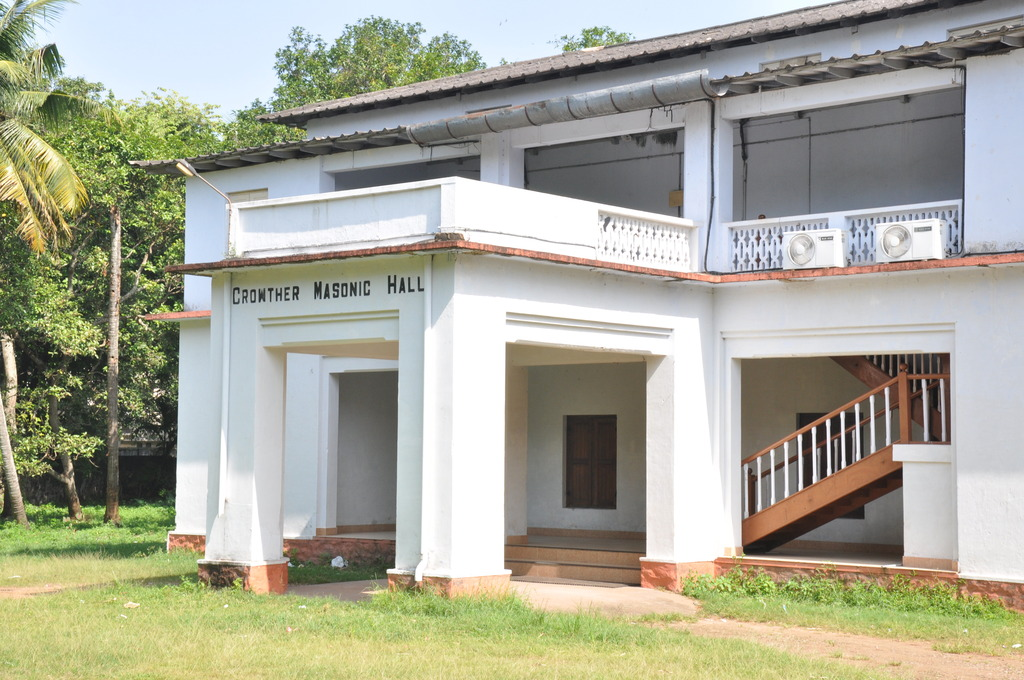
The Freemasons' Crowther Masonic Hall in Quilon city

The Goshamal Baradari, Hyderabad, built in 1682 by Sultan Abul Hassan Tana Shah, is the oldest building used as a Masonic Temple in India. Built in 1682, it was donated to the fraternity in 1872 by the 6th Nizam of Kingdom of Hyderabad - Mir Mahbub Ali Khan.

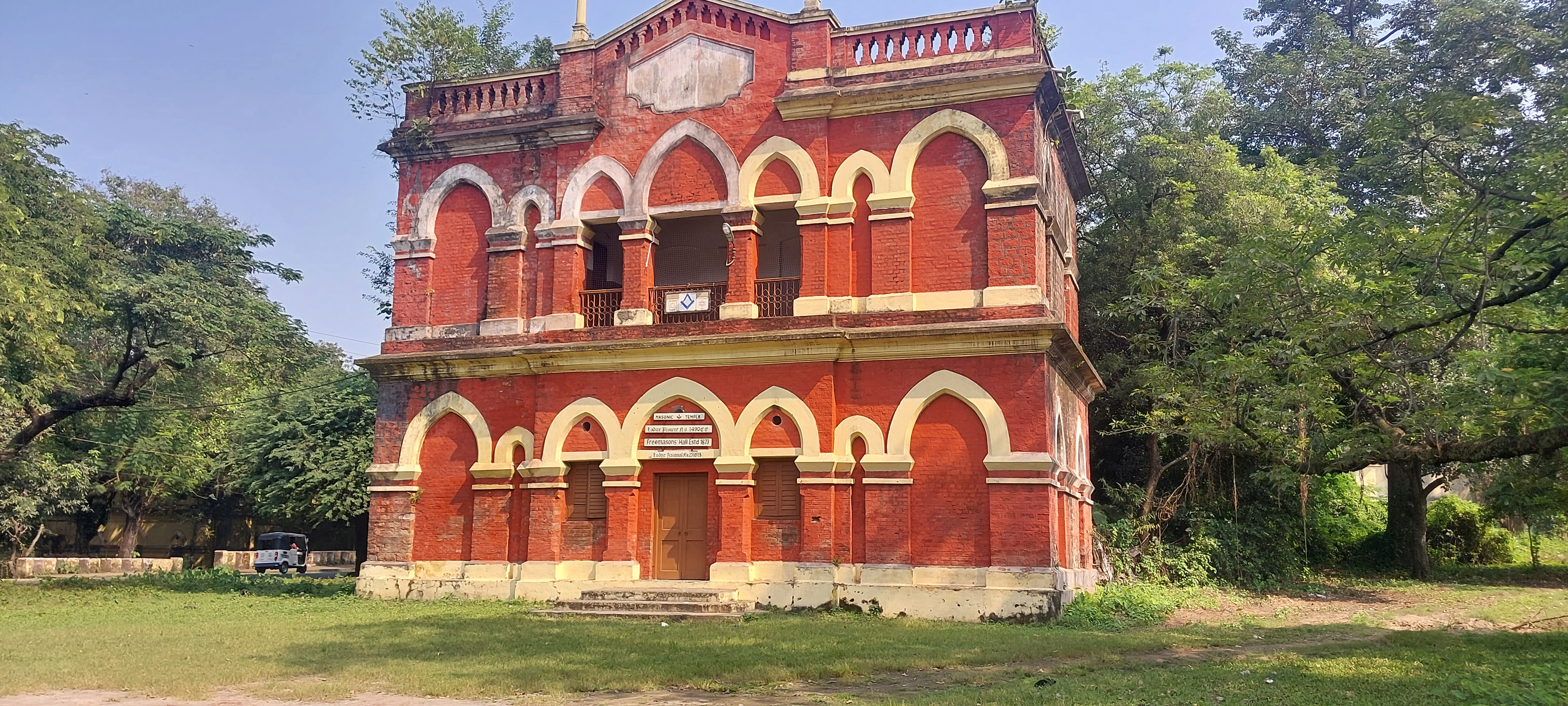
Freemasons Hall, Asansol, founded in 1873 in Asansol

Over the decades, Freemasonry in India has continued to expand. Today, the country has approximately 470 lodges and over 160 Royal Arch Chapters, along with Mark Lodges and Royal Ark Mariner Lodges. These lodges are distributed across 172 cities, with a total membership of around 23,000 Freemasons.

== Philanthropy ==
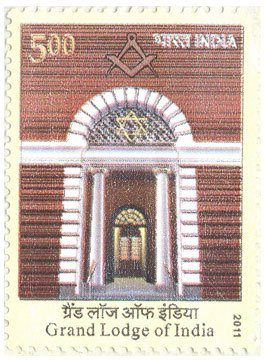
Stamp of India 2011 Grand Lodge Of India

Under the Jyotirgamaya, initiated by Grand Master Dr Balaram Biswakumar to mark the Golden Jubilee of the GLI; The Grand Lodge of India took the initiative to light up 50 villages across remote areas in the country that did not have access to electricity till date. The GLI constructed 74 houses for the tsunami-affected, building a 10,000 sq.ft hall in Pallam village in Kanyakumari. The GLI also organizes classrooms for children in prisons, and renders help for disaster victims. The GLI has close to 500 Lodges in India with close to 25,000 members.
