= Indian civil servant =

Indian civil servants includes five principal sub-categories of officials:

- Administrators of the native states of India
- Administrators of British India who came as servants of the East India Company before the formation of the ICS in 1853
- Members of the former Indian Civil Service (ICS) as well as the superior central and nationalised services in British India, who joined the civil service after 1853.
  - Dewans of the former Indian Princely States
- Employees of the Central Civil Services of the present Government of India, and respective Indian state governments including the
  - Indian Administrative Service
  - Indian Forest Service
  - Indian Police Service
- Technocrats and Academic Administrators who have held official positions of the Government of India and the respective state governments of the Indian Union.

For lists of civil servants of respective cadres see:

- List of Chief Secretaries of Rajasthan

== In popular culture ==
Since early 20th-century, Indian civil servants are colloquially called "babus", while Indian bureaucracy is called "babudom", as in the "rule of babus", especially in Indian media.

== See also ==
- Category:Indian civil servants
