= Crowther Masonic Hall =

Crowther Masonic Hall, Kollam
- ക്രൗതര്‍ മസോണിക് ഹാള്‍, കൊല്ലം
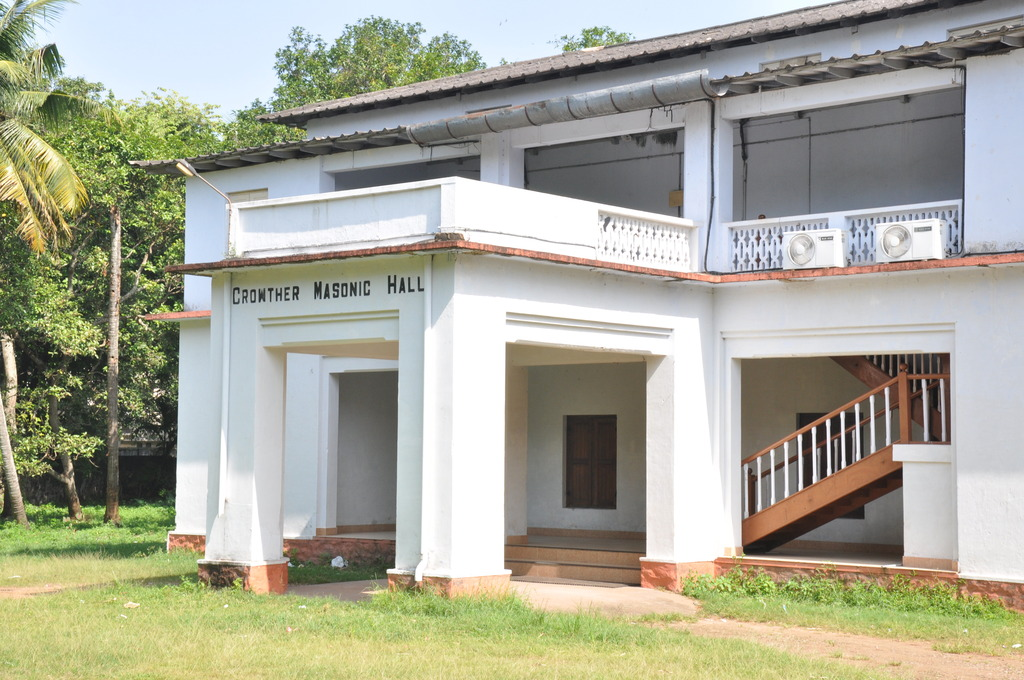
- The Crowther Masonic Hall in Quilon
- Interactive map of the Crowther Masonic Hall, Kollam area
- Former names: The Crowther Hall

General information
- Architectural style: British
- Location: Near DCC Office, Kochupilamoodu; Kollam, India
- Completed: 1806
- Owner: Freemasons of Kerala (Lodge Vanchinad)

Technical details
- Floor count: 2

Crowther Masonic Hall in Kollam is a part of the Grand Lodge of India and it was a meeting place for many Masonic Lodges in the Quilon (Kollam) area. It is near Kochupilamoodu in Kollam city and has been a Masonic meeting place since 1806. The building is now considered as a historic monument of Freemasonry activities in ancient Travancore area.

== History ==
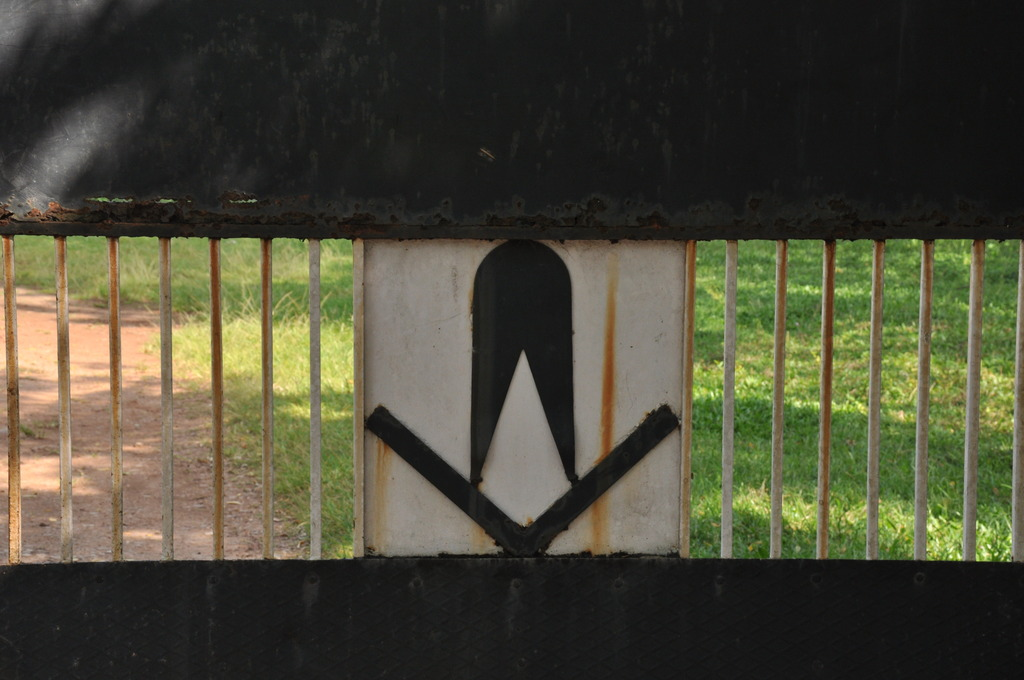
Freemasons Logo in the gate of Kollam Crowther Masonic Hall

The Crowther Masonic Hall, Kollam (formerly known as Quilon), built by the patron Esquire Mr. Richard Facey Hunter Crowther popularly known as R.F.H. Crowther (1892-1953), was there in the map of Grand Lodge of Freemasons even before the constitution of Grand Lodge of India. The first Freemasons lodge was established at Calcutta in 1730 and first Irish Lodge was established at Madras in 1754. Incidentally, the first Lodge in Kerala was founded in the year 1806 by the name "Travancore Union" at Quilon. It was actually the relocation of Lodge Minden (Lodge Minden no. 464) to Quilon. The Crowther Hall was constructed during that time by Richard Facey Hunter Crowther (1892-1953), who received Roll of Honour repeatedly in the years 1934, 1935 and 1941.

In 1822 another Lodge by the name ‘Hibernia and Union’ was started and that too at Quilon. In 1941, Lodge Quilon was established, nearly 135 years after the first Lodge in Quilon was constituted. Now the Kollam Freemasons are active in Lodge Vanchinad No. 273 Kollam, which is near Anandevalleeswaram temple in the city. A Freemasons hall is there in Anandevalleeswaram. They are conducting meetings on 1st Sunday of every month

== Threat of Demolition ==
In 2009, the district authorities had taken a decision to demolish Crowther Masonic Hall to build Kollam's court complex. Mr. Shajahan, the then district collector have directed the authorities to initiate the land inspection as a preliminary to the land transfer proposal. But later they dropped the project because of protests from the local population to demolish an ancient pride of the city.

== Location ==
- Kollam Junction railway station - 700 m
- Kollam KSRTC Bus Station - 1.9 km
- Andamukkam City Bus Station - 800 m
- Chinnakada - 1 km
