= Akbar Hydari =

Indian politician (1869–1941)

Sir Akbar Hydari
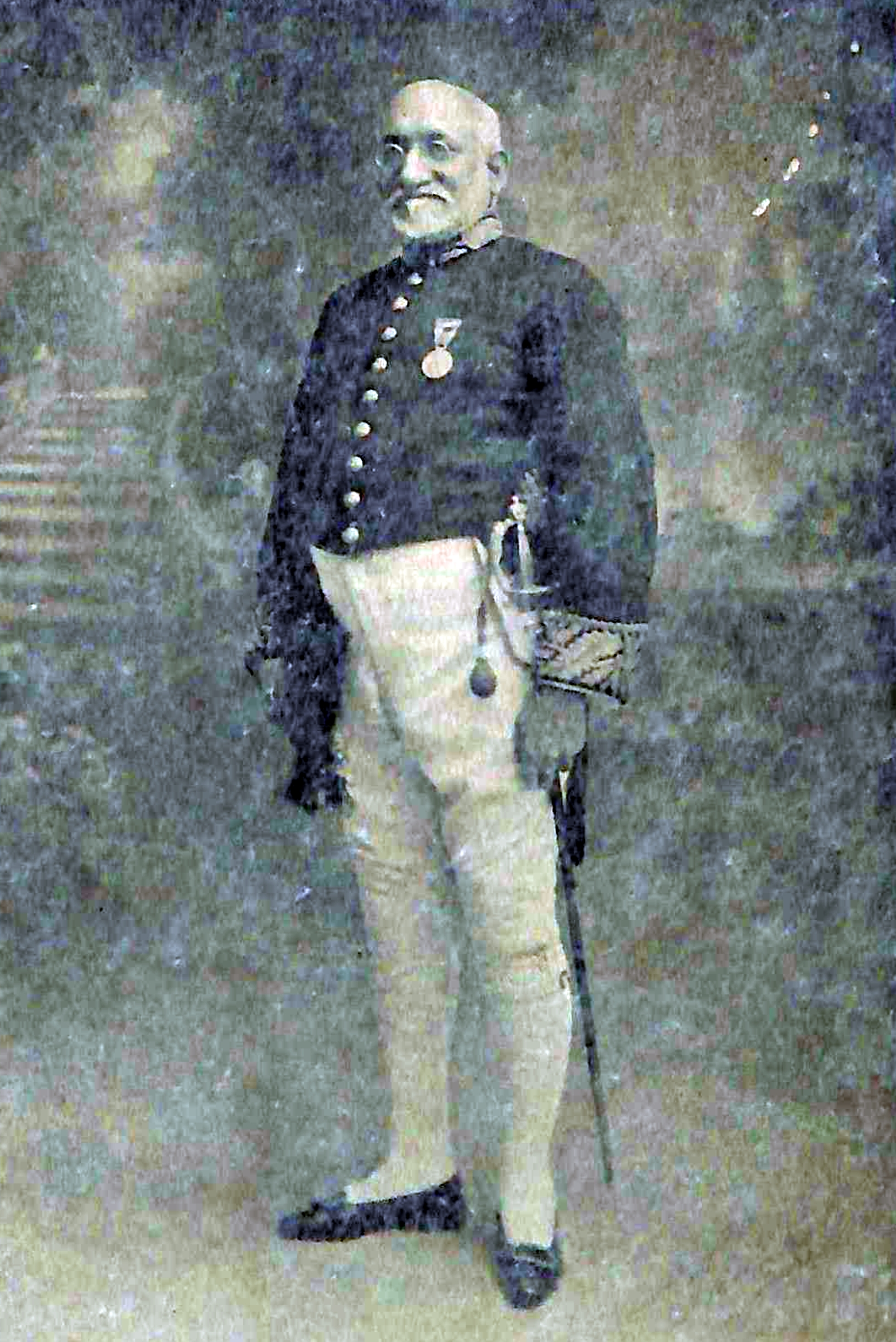

Prime Minister of Hyderabad
- In office 18 March 1937 – September 1941
- Preceded by: Maharaja Sir Kishen Pershad
- Succeeded by: Muhammad Ahmad Said Khan Chhatari

Personal details
- Born: 8 November 1869 Bombay, Bombay Presidency, British India
- Died: November 1941 (aged 71–72)
- Spouse: Amina Hydari (died 1939)
- Children: Muhammad Saleh Akbar Hydari
- Relatives: Tyabji family (through spouse)
- Occupation: Politician

To be distinguished from his son, Muhammad Saleh Akbar Hydari, who was the Governor of Assam.

Sir Muhammad Akbar Nazar Ali Hydari, Sadr ul-Maham, PC (1869–1941) was an Indian politician. He served as the Prime Minister of Hyderabad State from 18 March 1937 to September 1941.

== Early life and education ==
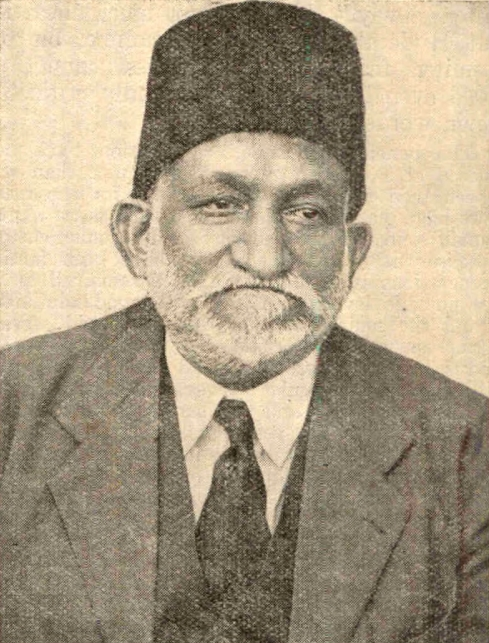
Portrait from Modern Review (1942)

Hydari was born on 8 November 1869 into a Sulaymani Bohra family of Muslims. His father was Seth Nazar Ali Hydari, a businessman based in Bombay.

Hydari was educated at St. Xavier's College in Bombay and from 1888 worked in the civil service of British India. In 1905, he entered the service of the Nizam of Hyderabad and held various senior positions. He oversaw the expansion of the school system and the reform of state finances. Hydari planned the establishment of Osmania University.

== Career ==
Hydari served in the Indian Audit and Accountancy Service before moving to Hyderabad State, where he became the finance minister and later the prime minister.

In 1920, he spent a short period back in British India as chief accountant in Bombay. After returning to Hyderabad, he headed the Department of Police, Justice, and General Affairs. Hydari was the first Muslim to pass the examination of the Gazetted Officer for the Finance Department. In 1921, he became head of the Finance Department. Hydari also led the state railway company and the Hyderabad (Deccan) Company. From 1930 to 1931, he headed Hyderabad's delegation to the First Round Table Conference on India's future in London.

On 13 March 1937, Hydari was appointed Prime Minister and head of the Executive Council, succeeding Kishen Pershad. In July 1941, he was appointed a member of the Viceroy's Executive Council., after which he was succeeded as Prime Minister by Sayyad Hafiz Mohammed Ahmed, Nawab of Chhatari, and moved to New Delhi.

Hydari was also interested in archaeology and was involved in the establishment of the Archaeological Department in Hyderabad. The collection of miniature paintings he acquired was bequeathed to the Prince Albert Museum, now the Dr. Bhau Daji Lad Museum, in Bombay and the State Archaeological Museum in Hyderabad.

Hydari was pivotal in the foundation of the Doon School, working to obtain the former estate of the Forest Research Institute, in Dehradun, from the government on favourable terms for the site of the school. Of the four original houses Hyderabad House was named after Akbar Hydari, who secured a contribution from Nizam of Hyderabad's government.

He was a freemason, and largely responsible for the restoration of the Ajanta Caves.

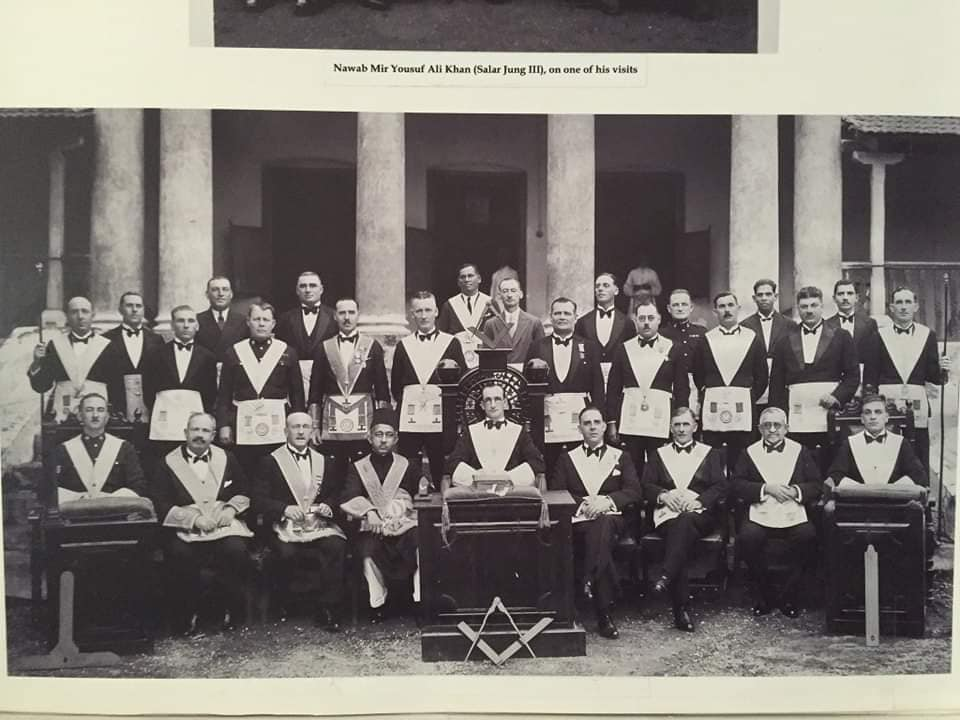
Sir Akbar Hydari seen with freemasons outside The St. John's Masonic Lodge, Secunderabad

== Family ==
He was the father of Muhammad Saleh Akbar Hydari through his wife Amina Hydari of the Tyabji family. His grand daughter, Habiba Hydari married the Goan painter, Mario Miranda. His great-granddaughter is actress Aditi Rao Hydari.

=== Honours ===
Hydari was knighted by the British government in the 1928 Birthday Honours. and was formally invested with his knighthood at Hyderabad on 17 December 1929 by the Viceroy, the Lord Irwin.

Hydari held a number of honorary titles and received many distinctions. He was awarded the titles Nawab Hyder Jung Bahadur. In 1928, Hydari received British knighthood as a Knight Bachelor, and was formally invested with his knighthood at Hyderabad on 17 December 1929 by the Viceroy, the Lord Irwin. In January 1936, he was appointed a member of the Privy Council of the United Kingdom. Hydari was an honorary doctor at Osmania University and the University of Madras.

== See also ==
- Aditi Rao Hydari
- Mario Miranda
- Tyabji Family

Government offices
Preceded by Maharaja Sir Kishen Pershad	Prime Minister of Hyderabad; 1937–1941	Succeeded by Nawab Chhatari
