= 2009 Greater Hyderabad Municipal Corporation election =

- 23 November 2009

All 150 elected seats in the Greater Hyderabad Municipal Corporation 76 seats needed for a majority
- Turnout: 43.04%
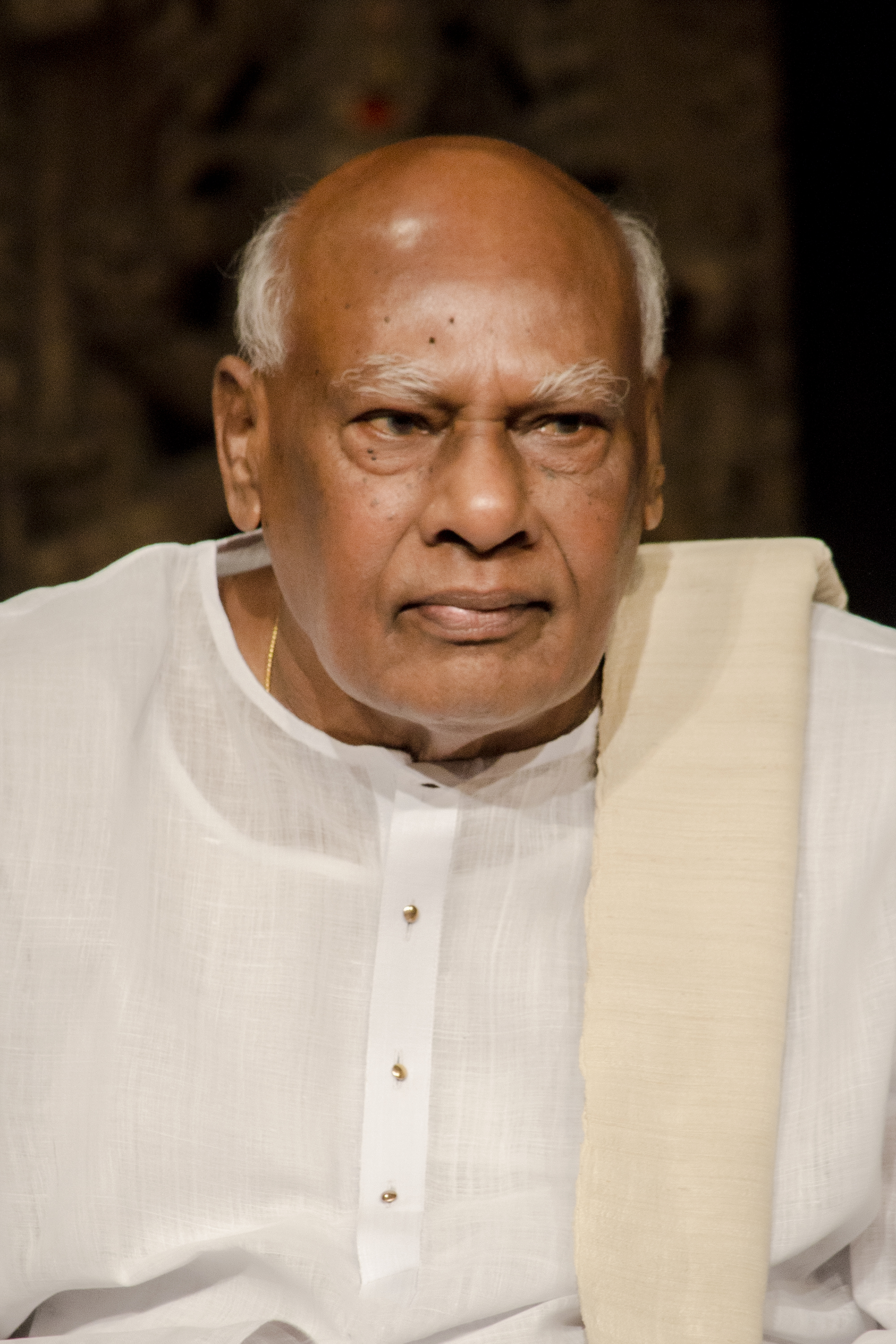

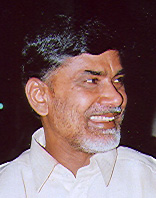

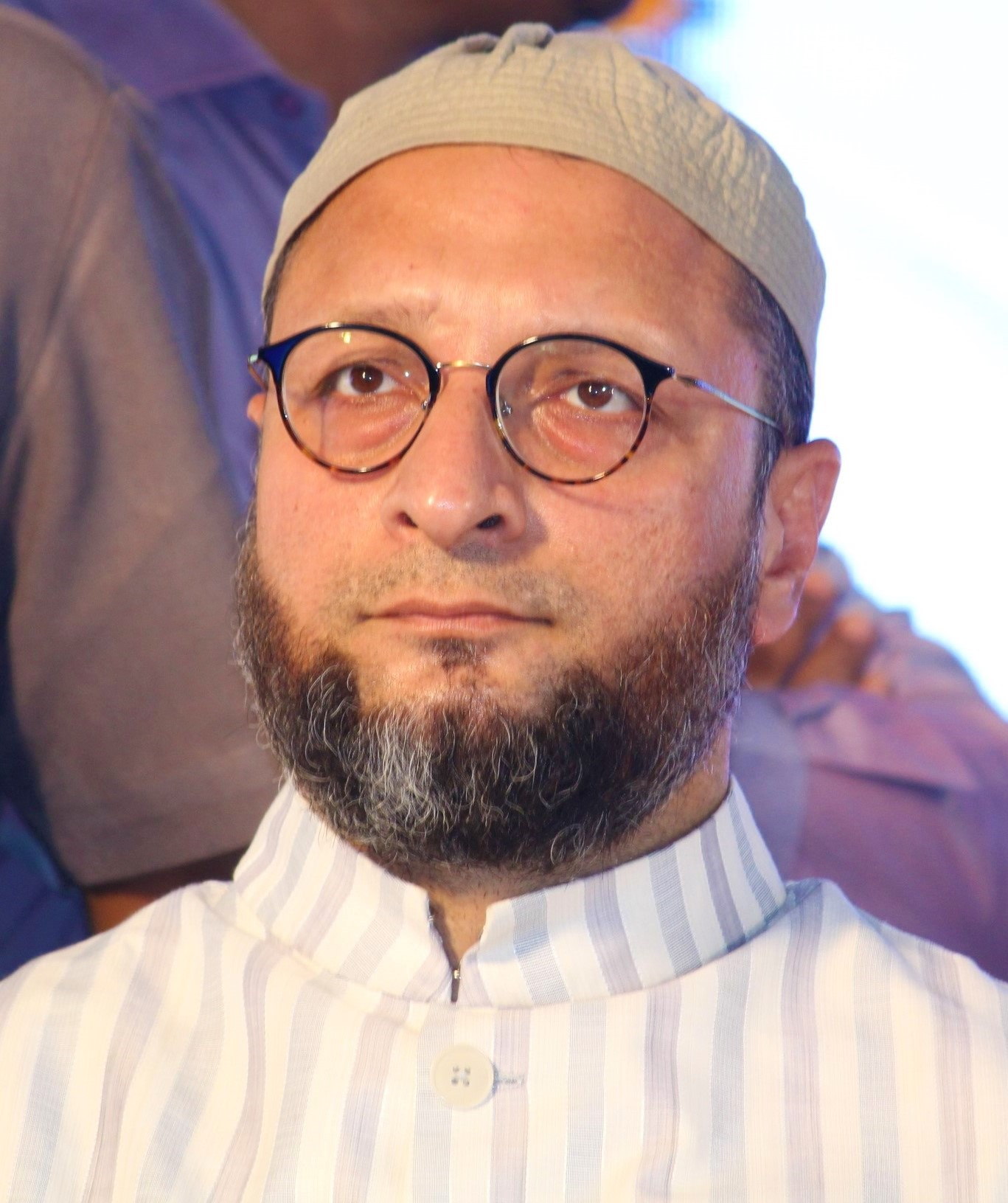

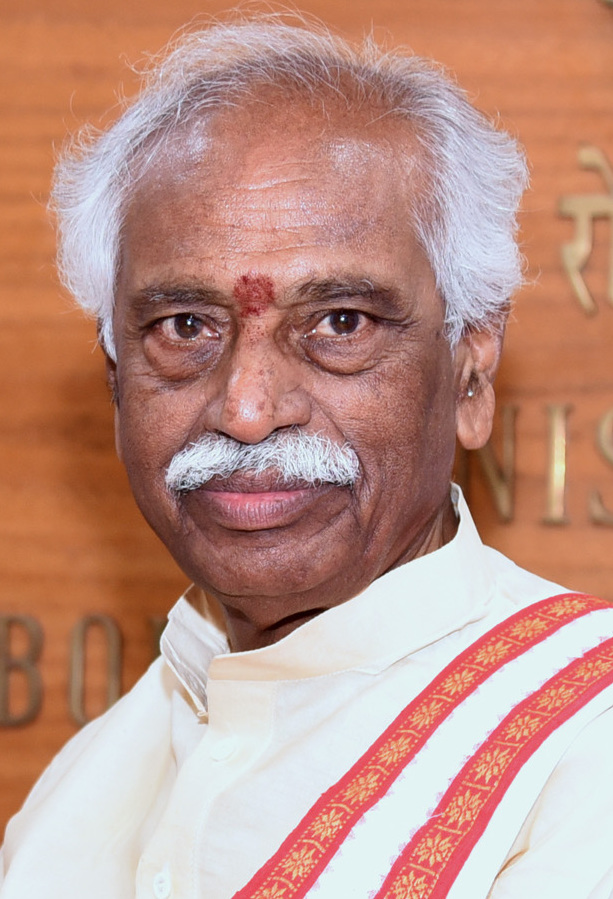
	First party	Second party
Leader	Konijeti Rosaiah	N. Chandrababu Naidu
Party	INC	TDP
Seats before	19	22
Seats won	52	45
Seat change	▲33	▲23
Percentage	28.40%	28.03%
	Third party	Fourth party
Leader	Asaduddin Owaisi	Bandaru Dattatreya
Party	AIMIM	BJP
Seats before	34	18
Seats won	43	5
Seat change	▲11	▼13
Percentage	14.44%	9.97%
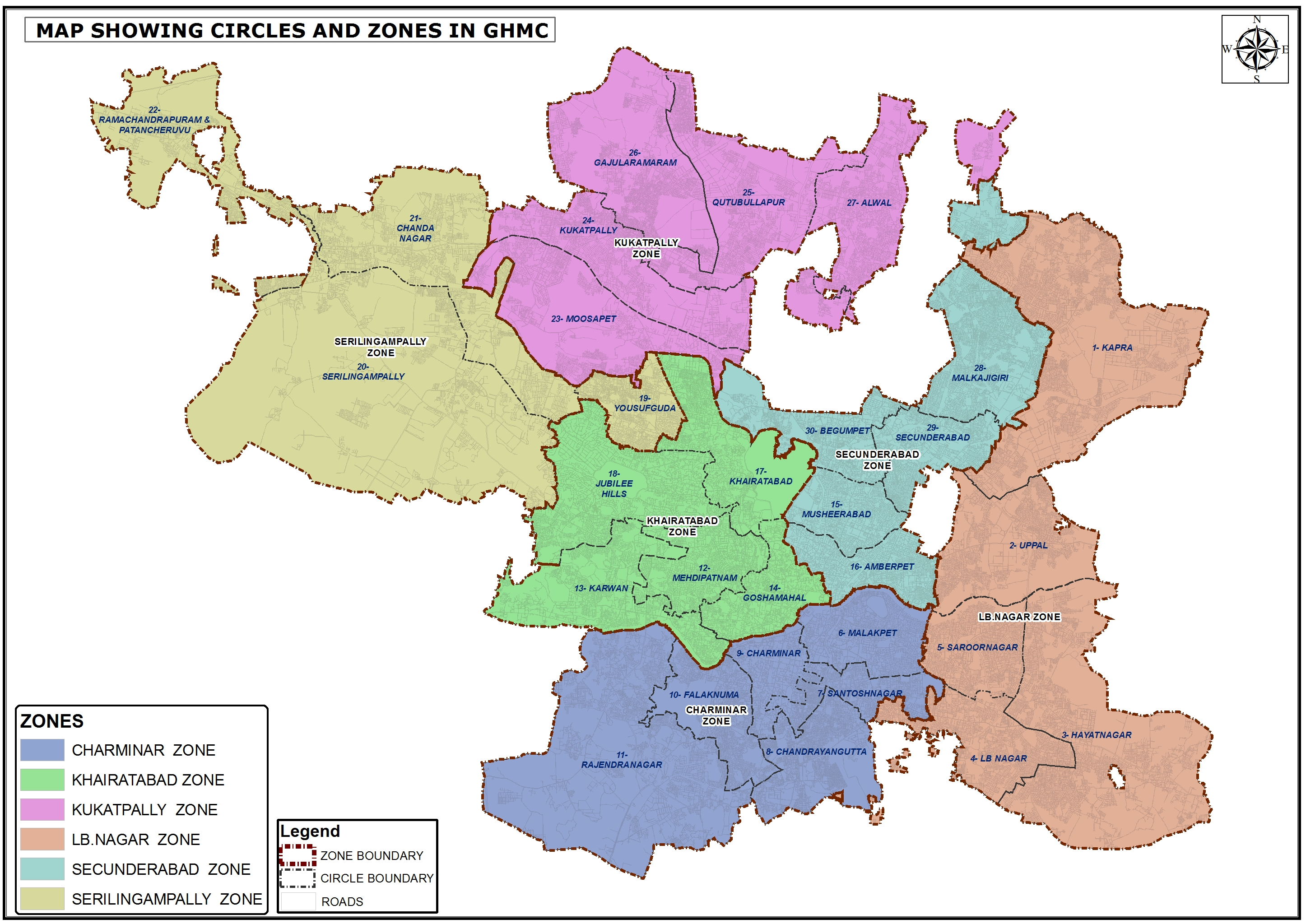
Mayor before election
Vacant
Elected Mayor
Banda Karthika Reddy
Indian National Congress

The 2009 Greater Hyderabad Municipal Corporation election was conducted on 23 November 2009 to elect members to all 150 wards of the municipal corporation. These were the first elections since to the GHMC since its creation in 2007. About 43% of the 57 lakh (5.7 million) voters cast their vote in the polls. The Indian National Congress and the All India Majlis-e-Ittehadul Muslimeen formed the government in a post-poll agreement. Banda Karthika Reddy, corporator from Tarnaka became the mayor from the Congress Party and Toli Chowki corporator Jaffer Hussain became deputy mayor from AIMIM.

== Election schedule ==
The Andhra Pradesh State Election Commission announced the schedule for the GHMC election on 29 October 2009.

Event	Date
Date of notification	31 October 2009
Last date for filing nominations	6 November 2009
Date for scrutiny of nominations	7 November 2009
Last date for withdrawal of candidatures	10 November 2009
Date of poll	23 November 2009
Date of counting	26 November 2009

== Results ==
=== Results by ward ===
Results
Ward		Winner			Runner Up			Margin
#	Name	Candidate	Party	Votes	Candidate	Party	Votes	Margin
1	Kapra	Kotha Rama Rao	TDP	6216	B. Ramachandar	INC	5803	413
2	Cherlapally	Singireddy Dhanpal Reddy	IND	6880	Sappidi Srinivas Reddy	INC	4673	2207
3	Mallapur	G. Srinivas Reddy	TDP	7916	Pericherla Krishnam Raju	INC	6669	1247
4	Nacharam	Nemali Suresh	INC	6078	A. Padma Reddy	IND	4914	1164
5	Uppal	Pogula Suguna	INC	6546	Aratikayala Balamari	TDP	6221	325
6	Habsiguda	Hari Vardhan Reddy S.	INC	6332	Bobbala Ramana Reddy	TDP	6229	103
7	Ramanthapur	M. Parameshwar Reddy	INC	6978	Kandikanti Ashok Kumar	TDP	6001	977
8	Kothapet	V. Prakash Goud	TDP	8430	Ananthula Raja Reddy	INC	8220	210
9	Mansoorabad	Koppula Latha	TDP	14102	Jakkidi Prasanna	INC	9459	4643
10	Hayathnagar	Sama Prabhakar Reddy	TDP	9788	Kallem Ravinder Reddy	BJP	7148	2640
11	Vanasthalipuram	Jitta Raja Shekar Reddy	TDP	5911	Muddagouni Jagan Mohan Goud	INC	4879	1032
12	Karmanghat	Gajjala Sushma	TDP	13936	Alampally Manjula	INC	6572	7364
13	Champapet	S. Ramana Reddy	TDP	10648	Middela Jithender	INC	8824	1824
14	Saroornagar	Yellati Bhargavi	TDP	6782	K. Vijaya	INC	6691	91
15	Ramakrishnapuram	Depa Surekha	TDP	10568	Shailaja Kolisetty	INC	7384	3184
16	Gaddiannaram	Bichinepally Subhasini	INC	6671	Rapolu Manikeshwari	TDP	5632	1039
17	P&T Colony	Dhana Lakshmi Edupuganti	TDP	7055	Satya Prabha G.	INC	4817	2238
18	Moosarambagh	Mohammed Aslam Pasha	TDP	2798	P. Ramu Yadav	BJP	2617	181
19	Saidabad	Singireddy Srinivas Reddy	TDP	8555	Borra Praveen Reddy	INC	5119	3436
20	IS Sadan	Manchi Reddy	TDP	6537	Sama Sunder Reddy	BJP	5399	1138
21	Santoshnagar	Mir Wajid Ali Khan	AIMIM	9723	Shameem Sultana	TDP	1672	8051
22	Riyasat Nagar	Mirza Mustafa Beig	AIMIM	9074	M. A. Habeeb	MBT	1791	7283
23	Kanchanbagh	Mohd Mumtaz Ali	AIMIM	5058	Ayub Khan	MBT	1301	3757
24	Barkas	Mansoor bin Mohd Awalgi	AIMIM	6682	Saleh bin Ahmed Bahamed	MBT	3946	2736
25	Chandrayan Gutta	Abdul Qavi Ansari	AIMIM	1944	J. Rajender Kumar	INC	1084	860
26	Jangammet	Karamtot Thara Bai	AIMIM	3966	K. Vijay Laxmi	TDP	3848	118
27	Uppuguda	A. Samed Ahmed Abdul	AIMIM	4890	Bujji Venkatesh Rao	TDP	2708	2182
28	Lalithabagh	Dr Mohd Yousuf Naqshbandi	AIMIM	4467	Pendam Laxman	BJP	2332	2135
29	Rain Bazar	Khaja Ghouse Mohiuddin	AIMIM	10729	Md Abdul Shafeeq	TDP	3136	7593
30	Kurmaguda	K. Sahadev	BJP	5165	Mohd Mazaffar Hussain	AIMIM	4954	211
31	Chavni	Mohd Murtuza Ali	AIMIM	5446	Shaik Gaffor	TDP	1938	3508
32	Akberbagh	Syed Minhajuddin	AIMIM	4169	Yadi Reddy G.	TDP	4121	48
33	Saleem Nagar	C. Srinivas	TDP	2022	V. N. Reddy	INC	1998	24
34	Old Malakpet	Syed Abdul Haq Nazeer	AIMIM	6566	Nakka Amarender Goud	TDP	3380	3186
35	Azampura	Amjed Ullah Khan	MBT	5768	Aslam Ali Khan	AIMIM	4436	1332
36	Dabeerpura	Shaik Shakeel Mahmood	AIMIM	7510	Mohammed Chand	MBT	1297	6213
37	Noorkhan Bazar	Mirza Riyaz ul Hassan Effendi	AIMIM	4935	Hussain bin Ahmed	TDP	1855	3080
38	Pathergatti	Mohsin bin Abdullah Balala	AIMIM	6482	M. A. Wahed Shakeel	TDP	2130	4352
39	Talabchanchalam	Mohd. Wajahat Ali Khan	AIMIM	14948	Hani bin Mubarak	MBT	4288	10660
40	Moghalpura	Mohd Mukrram Ali	AIMIM	6406	Mohammed Abdul Qavi Abbasi	TDP	2213	4193
41	Gowlipura	A. Jeetendra	INC	4505	Gali Prabhakar	BJP	3894	611
42	Aliabad	Chenna Boina Rajender	TDP	4239	Buddan Sadanand	IND	2628	1611
43	Falaknuma	Noor Jahan Begum	AIMIM	9243	Raheemunnisa Begum	INC	977	8266
44	Nawabsaheb Kunta	Qamar Begum	AIMIM	6148	S. Manjula	INC	499	5649
45	Jahanuma	Ameena Begum	AIMIM	7970	Kum. Aliya Begum	TDP	428	7542
46	Fathe Darwaza	Meraj Mohammed	AIMIM	5206	Shaik Azeem	TDP	395	4811
47	Shali Banda	Mohd. Ghouse	AIMIM	8386	Md. Nazeeruddin	TDP	1310	7076
48	Hussain Alam	Mir Zulfeqar Ali	AIMIM	9057	Mohd Abdul Qayyum	TDP	2121	6936
49	Ghansi Bazar	Ranjana Devi Goel	INC	3318	Megha Rani Agarwal	BJP	2766	552
50	Begum Bazar	G. Shanker Yadav	INC	6236	Ramesh Lal Yadav	BJP	4531	1705
51	Goshamahal	M. Vaikuntham	BJP	5744	Ala Purushotham Rao	INC	5155	589
52	Dhoolpet	Anil Singh D.	INC	4544	Dinesh Yadav	TDP	3354	1190
53	Puranapul	Sunnam Srilatha	AIMIM	4948	Pusthe Uma Rani	TDP	4734	214
54	Doodbowli	Gaffar M. A.	AIMIM	6551	Katta Venkatachalam	BJP	1981	4570
55	Ramnaspura	Md. Mubeen	AIMIM	8024	Mohammed Yousuf	TDP	1398	6626
56	Kishanbagh	Aziz Baig	AIMIM	8955	Dr. Aluka Srinivas Rao	TDP	1276	7679
57	Shivarampally	Habeeb Zain	AIMIM	6277	Syed Haji	IND	3328	2949
58	Mylardevpally	Tholukatti Prem Dass Goud	TDP	10236	Sanem Srinivas Goud	INC	9911	325
59	Rajendranagar	Satyanarayana J.	INC	7306	Rajkumar S.	TDP	5824	1482
60	Attapur	Farhana Begum	AIMIM	8931	Anasuya V.	INC	7471	1460
61	Karwan	Avvula Aruna	AIMIM	5897	Suman Bai	BJP	4235	1662
62	Ziaguda	A. Krishna	INC	5782	Aadala Chandra Mohan	TDP	3509	2273
63	Dattathreyanagar	Eshrath Sultana	AIMIM	9328	M. Tara Bai	INC	1499	7829
64	Manghalhat	T. Raja Singh	TDP	6467	Anand Singh	INC	5569	898
65	Asifnagar	Malekaunnisa Begum	AIMIM	5208	A. Indira	INC	3809	1399
66	Muradnagar	Md. Zakir Baqueri	AIMIM	6394	T. Swamy Goud	INC	1670	4724
67	Mehdipatnam	Bangari Prakash	BJP	3560	T. Jeevan Singh	AIMIM	2035	1525
68	Gudimalkapur	D. Deepa	BJP	6816	G. Vijaya	AIMIM	3582	3234
69	Lunger House	B. Ravi Yadav	AIMIM	5069	C. Uday Kumar	BJP	4861	208
70	Tolichowki	Jaffer Hussain	AIMIM	9167	Mohd Yousuf	INC	1959	7208
71	Nanalnagar	Najma Sulthana	AIMIM	10759	Qauser Shaik	TDP	1090	9669
72	Ahmed Nagar	Mohd Majid Hussain	AIMIM	6435	Mohammed Azam	PRP	1932	4503
73	Vijayanagar Colony	Mohsina Parveen	AIMIM	3305	B. Chandrakala	INC	2141	1164
74	Chintalbasti	Yasmeena Sultana	AIMIM	3696	L. Srivara	INC	3185	511
75	Mallepally	Md. Ghouse Pasha	AIMIM	5380	S. Jeevan Lal	INC	2801	2579
76	Red Hills	Zaheera Begum	AIMIM	3731	Jaya Prabha V.	INC	1713	2018
77	Jambagh	Mohammed Nazeeruddin	AIMIM	5223	G. Srinivas Yadav	BJP	4520	703
78	Gunfoundry	Madhu Goud	INC	3151	D. Mohan	IND	2985	166
79	Sultan Bazar	M. P. Sriram Chander	INC	4891	M. Anand Kumar	TDP	4268	623
80	Himayathnagar	J. Hemalatha	TDP	5856	J. Indira Rao	INC	5690	166
81	Barkatpura	Diddi Rambabu	IND	3428	Krishna Reddy A.	TDP	3326	102
82	Kachiguda	K. Uma Rani	BJP	6606	R. Urmila Yadav	INC	5532	1074
83	Golnaka	Kaleru Venkatesham	INC	5462	K. Durga Prasad Reddy	TDP	3963	1499
84	Amberpet	Md. Farooquddin	AIMIM	6423	G. Anand Goud	INC	4464	1959
85	Bagh Amberpet	Ganeshwar Goud P.	INC	3261	Narsing Rao C.	BJP	2520	741
86	Vidyanagar	Adapa Chandra Mouli	TDP	3050	N. Yadagiri Rao	BJP	2910	140
87	Nallakunta	Gariganti Sridevi	INC	7120	Peram Shyama Sundari	BJP	4354	2766
88	Bagh Lingampally	M. Prabhakar Reddy	INC	4974	A. Venkat Reddy	BJP	3421	1553
89	Adikmet	C. Sunitha	INC	3375	V. Aruna Kumari	TDP	3373	2
90	Ramnagar	R. Kalpana Yadav	INC	6042	Geeta A.	TDP	4748	1294
91	Musheerabad	Saritha Govind	TDP	2822	Mani Rajeshwar T.	INC	2616	206
92	Bholapur	Mohammed Wajid Hussain S.	IND	5072	Md. Junaid Baghdadi	AIMIM	4203	869
93	Gandhinagar	Muta Padma	TDP	3716	Esthar Rani G. K.	INC	2755	961
94	Kavadiguda	Raj Kunar G.	INC	4473	Dasaratham M.	CPI(M)	3838	635
95	Domalguda	P. Nirmala	INC	5518	B. Kamala	TDP	3674	1844
96	Khairtabad	Shaik Shareef	INC	7820	M. Mahender Babu	TDP	5786	1844
97	Punjagutta	B. Raju Yadav	INC	5759	A. Narasimha Rao	TDP	5123	636
98	Somajiguda	A. Mahesh Yadav	INC	4295	B. Narsimha Reddy	TDP	4233	62
99	Ameerpet	M. Venkata Ramana	TDP	2119	M. Lalitha Chouhan	INC	2071	48
100	Balkampet	N. Seshu Kumari	TDP	5408	P. Sandhya	INC	4462	946
101	Sanathnagar	Md. Ayub Khan	INC	3163	K. Bal Reddy	IND	2915	248
102	Erragadda	Kanjerla Sada Siva Yadav	TDP	5454	Md. Shareef	INC	5330	124
103	Vengalrao Nagar	M. Shyam Rao	INC	6833	Ch. Chandra Sekhar Rao	CPI(M)	4967	1866
104	Srinagar Colony	Attaluri Vijayalaxmi	TDP	5273	A. Sabitha	INC	4774	499
105	Banjara Hills	B. Bharati	INC	11494	S. Sujatha	TDP	8276	3218
106	Yousufguda	G. Rajamouli	TDP	5829	P. Yadagiri Yadav	INC	4753	1076
107	Rahmath Nagar	B. Chandramma	INC	9357	V. Sri Sailam Yadav	AIMIM	5042	4315
108	Borabanda	G. Vanaja G. Shiva Jyothi	INC	5696	Bhanumathi V.	AIMIM	4561	1135
109	Jubilee Hills	Mamidi Laxmi Bai	INC	7713	Madhavi Tirukkovalluri	TDP	7260	453
110	Shaikpet	Atmakuri Sudhaker	INC	5448	Syed Wazahat Ali	AIMIM	3184	2264
111	Gachibowli	Avula Satyanarayana	INC	7876	D. Janardhan	TDP	7304	572
112	Serilingampally	Neelam Ravinder	TDP	11826	R. Sujatha Yadav	INC	11208	618
113	Hafeezpet	V. Jagadeeshwar	INC	11371	B. Satyanarayana Yadav	TDP	8724	2647
114	Chanda Nagar	P. Ashok Goud	TDP	10486	S. Srinivas Goud	INC	10481	5
115	Ramachandrapuram	B. Pushpa	INC	9586	Thonta Girija	TDP	7358	2228
116	Patancheruvu	M. Sapana Dev	TDP	7844	K. Shankar Yadav	INC	7216	628
117	KPHB Colony	Dandamudi Sobhanadri	TDP	10935	P. Harish Reddy	JD(U)	10342	593
118	Moosapet	Baburao Pagudala	TDP	8784	Thumu Rajanikanth	INC	6180	2604
119	Mothinagar	Syed Hussain	TDP	14522	K. Ganesh Reddy	INC	11173	3349
120	Fathe Nagar	Muddapuram Krishna Goud	TDP	5563	K. B. Raju	INC	5040	523
121	Old Bowenpally	M. Narsimha Yadav	PRP	7900	G. Narender Goud	TDP	6907	993
122	Kukatpally	Gottimukkala Vengal Rao	INC	7241	Satyanarayana Srirangam	TDP	5838	1403
123	Vivekananda Nagar Colony	M. Ranga Rao	TDP	11505	G. Ram Chandar	INC	7728	3777
124	Hydernagar	M. Bhanu Prasad	TDP	14846	N. Srinivasa Rao	INC	10487	4359
125	Gajula Ramaram	Ravula Sheshagiri	INC	6267	Rasheed Baig	TDP	5031	1236
126	Jagadgirigutta	K. Jagan	INC	5996	Ailaiah Guda	CPI	2749	3247
127	Chintal	Budda Vijay Shekar	TDP	6231	K. Jayaram	INC	5001	1230
128	Shapur Nagar	Batta Krishna	TDP	7287	M. Madan Goud	INC	5628	1659
129	Suraram Colony	G. Suryanarayana Reddy	INC	7302	Bobba Ranga Reddy	TDP	5294	2008
130	Jeedimetla	Koona Manikyam Gourish	TDP	6917	Nalla Chandra Shekar Goud	INC	5927	990
131	Quthbullapur	Boddu Venkateshwara Rao	TDP	6718	Karan Singh	INC	4348	2370
132	Alwal	Geetha Rani T.	INC	7597	K. Sabitha	TDP	6020	1577
133	Macha Bollaram	E. S. Raj Jitender Nath	TDP	10866	M. V. Surya Kiran	INC	6150	4716
134	Yapral	A. R. Prasanna Kumari	INC	4672	Kavitha R. K.	IND	2445	2227
135	Defence Colony	Mariamma Iype	INC	7581	Babitha Madhav Yadav P.	TDP	7240	341
136	Moula Ali	Bharathi Raj B.	INC	6584	Jilla Rama Mani	TDP	6479	105
137	Safilguda	Manjula N.	TDP	8497	Avula Lavanya Yadav	INC	4177	4320
138	Gautham Nagar	Sumalatha R.	TDP	8508	Anumula Rajitha Reddy	INC	6880	1628
139	Old Malkajgiri	Prem Kumar Y.	TDP	9336	Yadaiah T.	INC	6266	3070
140	Tarnaka	Banda Karthika Reddy	INC	8406	Geetha M.	TDP	4619	3787
141	Mettuguda	M. R. Srinivasa Rao	INC	5212	K. Komaraiah	TDP	4589	623
142	Seethaphalmandi	Adam Vijay Kumar	INC	4381	Allakunta Haribabu	IND	2175	2206
143	Boudha Nagar	Adam Umadevi	INC	7972	Kandi Vidyavathi	TDP	6866	1106
144	Chilkalguda	P. Meera	INC	5196	Baggu Madhavi	TDP	5057	139
145	Padmarao Nagar	A. Savithri	TDP	4748	Iytha Rajani Devi	INC	4466	282
146	Bansilalpet	J. Devanand	INC	6776	Bandi Shanthi Kumar	TDP	6257	519
147	Ramgopalpet	K. Kiranmayee	INC	5810	Akula Roopa	TDP	5167	643
148	Begumpet	T. Maheshwari	INC	7364	Y. Swetha Gangadhar	TDP	7142	222
149	Marredpally	K. Saritha Yadav	INC	4511	C. Anitha Yadav	TDP	3770	741
150	Addagutta	Ratna Kumari G. M.	INC	6087	G. Laxmi Hamsaraj	TDP	4996	1091
