= Secunderabad Assembly constituency =

Constituency in Telangana, India

Coordinates: 17.44°N 78.50°E

Secunderabad
- Constituency No. 70 for the Telangana Legislative Assembly
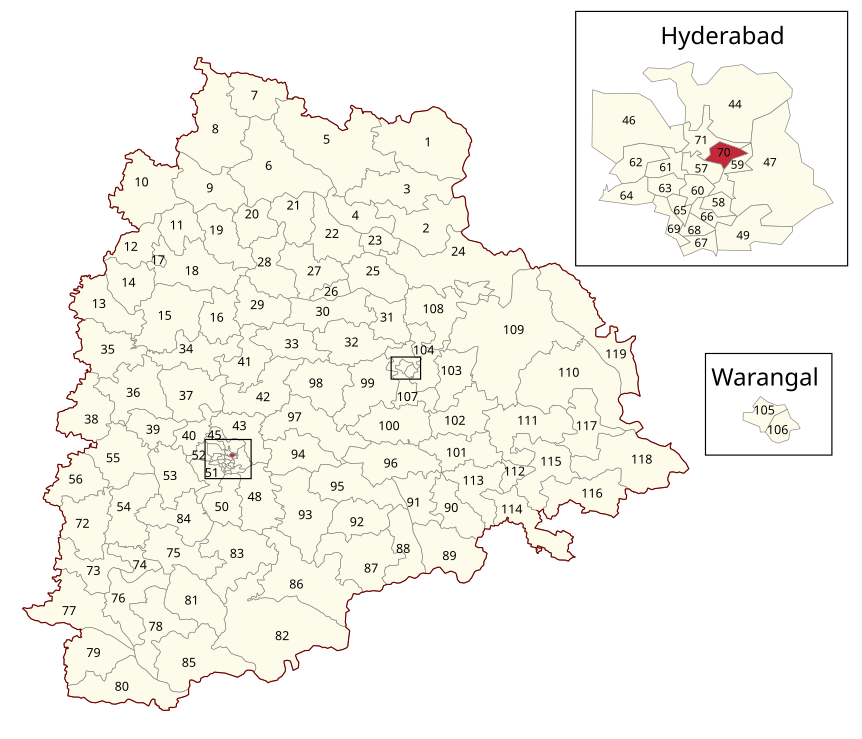
- Location of Secunderabad Assembly constituency within Telangana

Constituency details
- Country: India
- Region: South India
- State: Telangana
- District: Hyderabad
- Lok Sabha constituency: Secunderabad
- Established: 1951
- Total electors: 2,39,601
- Reservation: None

Member of Legislative Assembly
- 3rd Telangana Legislative Assembly
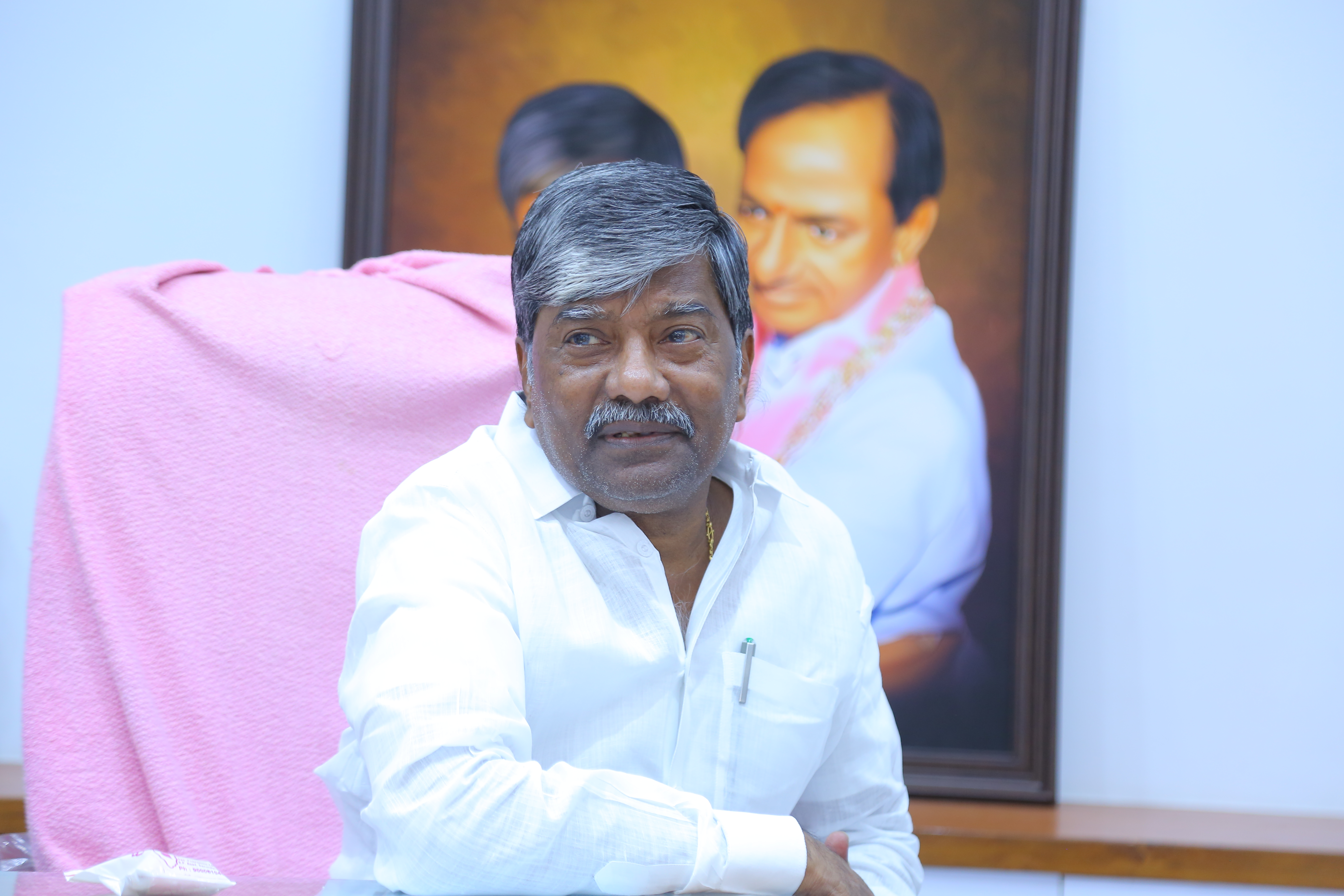
- Incumbent T. Padma Rao Goud
- Party: Bharat Rashtra Samithi

Secunderabad Assembly constituency is a constituency of the Telangana Legislative Assembly, India. It is one of the 26 constituencies of CURE limits, a strategic zone created by Government of Telangana. It is part of Secunderabad Lok Sabha constituency.

T. Padma Rao is representing the constituency.

== Extent of the constituency ==
The assembly constituency presently comprises five municipal divisions and the following neighbourhoods:

Neighbourhood
Addagutta
Boudhanagar
Mettuguda
Sitaphalmandi
Osmania University
Tarnaka
Chilakalguda
Namalagundu
Tukaramgate
Warasiguda
Parsigutta

== Members of Legislative Assembly ==
Year	MLA	Political Party
Hyderabad State
1952	V. B. Raju	Indian National Congress
Andhra Pradesh
1957	K. Satya Narayana	Indian National Congress
1962	K. Satya Narayana	Indian National Congress
1967	K. Satya Narayana	Indian National Congress
1972	L. Narayana	Indian National Congress
1978	L. Narayana	Janata Party
1983	M. Krishna Rao	Telugu Desam Party
1985	Alladi Raj Kumar	Telugu Desam Party
1989	Mary Ravindra Nath	Indian National Congress
1994	Talasani Srinivas Yadav	Telugu Desam Party
1999	Talasani Srinivas Yadav	Telugu Desam Party
2004	T. Padma Rao	Telangana Rashtra Samithi
2008^	Talasani Srinivas Yadav	Telugu Desam Party
2009	Jayasudha Kapoor	Indian National Congress
Telangana
2014	T. Padma Rao	Bharat Rashtra Samithi
2018	T. Padma Rao	Bharat Rashtra Samithi
2023	T. Padma Rao	Bharat Rashtra Samithi

== Election Results ==
=== 2023 ===
2023 Telangana Legislative Assembly election: Secunderabad
Party	Candidate	Votes	%	±%
BRS	T. Padma Rao Goud	78,223	55.42	
INC	Santhosh Kumar	32,983	23.37	
BJP	Mekala Sarangapani	25,202	17.86	
NOTA	None of the above	1,518	1.08	
IND	10 Independent Candidates	1,074	0.76	
OTH	11 Other Party Candidates	2,148	1.52	
Majority		45,240	32.05	
Turnout		1,41,148	53.76	
BRS hold		Swing		

=== 2018 ===
2018 Telangana Legislative Assembly election: Secunderabad
Party	Candidate	Votes	%	±%
TRS	T. Padma Rao Goud	79,309	60.18	
INC	Kasani Gyaneshwar Mudhiraja	33,839	25.68	
BJP	Satish Bandapelly	11,781	8.94	
NOTA	None of the above	1,582	1.20	
IND	13 Independent Candidates	1,886	1.44	
OTH	13 Other Party Candidates	3.382	2.57	
Majority		45,470	34.50	
Turnout		1,31,779	55.38	
TRS hold		Swing		

=== 2014 ===
2014 Telangana Legislative Assembly election: Secunderabad
Party	Candidate	Votes	%	±%
TRS	T. Padma Rao Goud	57,920	42.40	
TDP	Kuna Venkatesh Goud	31,941	23.38	
INC	Jayasudha Kapoor	14,090	10.31	
AIMIM	James Sylvester	12,721	9.31	
YSRCP	Vijay Kumar	11,668	8.54	
NOTA	None of the above	976	0.71	
IND	11 Independent Candidates	1,143	0.84	
OTH	15 Other Party Candidates	6,144	4.50	
Majority		25,979	19.02	
Turnout		1,36,603	57.00	
TRS gain from INC		Swing		

=== 2009 ===
2009 Andhra Pradesh Legislative Assembly election: Secunderabad
Party	Candidate	Votes	%	±%
INC	Jayasudha Kapoor	45,063	36.32	
TDP	Talasani Srinivas Yadav	40,668	32.78	
PRP	Mekala Saranga Pani	18,666	15.04	
LSP	Akula Maharani	9,287	7.49	
BJP	Shanigarapu Ramesh Chakra	6,599	5.32	
IND	8 Independent Candidates	2,351	1.90	
OTH	5 Other Party Candidates	1,436	1.16	
Majority		4,395	3.54	
Turnout		1,24,084	60.0	
INC gain from TDP		Swing		

=== 2008 by-election ===
2008 Secunderabad by-election
Party	Candidate	Votes	%	±%
TDP	Talasani Srinivas Yadav	50,031	41.52	
INC	Pitla Krishna	31,964	26.52	
TRS	T. Padma Rao	28,256	23.44	
LSP	Maganti Pradeep Kumar	5,908	4.90	
Mana Party	Nomula Prakash Rao	2,153	1.78	{{{change}}}
IND	A. Sathi Reddy	578	0.47	{{{change}}}
IND	Maloolm Anthony Taylor	430	0.35	{{{change}}}
IND	Karra Kashi Vishva Natham	283	0.23	{{{change}}}
IND	R. Rohini Kumar	204	0.16	{{{change}}}
IND	Gunoa Yadagiri	190	0.15	{{{change}}}
IND	B. Krishna Swamy	179	0.14	{{{change}}}
IND	Jannavula Srinivas Rao	128	0.10	{{{change}}}
IND	T. V. Nityand	121	0.10	{{{change}}}
IND	Dayanand Konda	72	0.05	{{{change}}}
Majority		18,067	15.00	{{{change}}}
Turnout		120,497	57.88	{{{change}}}

=== 2004 ===
2004 Andhra Pradesh Legislative Assembly election: Secunderabad
Party	Candidate	Votes	%	±%
TRS	T. Padma Rao Goud	56,997	48.35	
TDP	Talasani Srinivas Yadav	53,930	45.75	
BSP	S. Yellanna	3,357	2.85	
IND	2 Independent Candidates	2,379	2.02	
OTH	2 Other Party Candidates	1,224	1.04	
Majority		3,067	2.60	
Turnout		1,17,881	51.90	
TRS gain from TDP		Swing		

=== 1999 ===
1999 Andhra Pradesh Legislative Assembly election: Secunderabad
Party	Candidate	Votes	%	±%
TDP	Talasani Srinivas Yadav	79,130	61.25	
INC	Mary Ravindra Nath	41,607	32.21	
NTRTDP(LP)	Gandham Guru Murthy	3,004	2.33	{{{change}}}
Andhra Nadu Telugu Desam Party (Laxmi Parvathi)	B. Hanumanth Rao	2,057	1.59	{{{change}}}
Janata Dal (Secular)	K. Shanker	946	0.73	{{{change}}}
IND	A. Sathi Reddy	768	0.59	{{{change}}}
IND	Godavari Shanthi Devi	666	0.52	{{{change}}}
Shiv Sena	A. R. Raju	404	0.31	{{{change}}}
Majority		37,523	29.04	
Turnout		129,190	54.5	

=== 1994 ===
1994 Andhra Pradesh Legislative Assembly election: Secunderabad
Party	Candidate	Votes	%	±%
TDP	Talasani Srinivas Yadav	45,358	47.29	
INC	Mary Ravindra Nath	24,897	25.96	
BJP	G. R. Karunakaran	18,741	19.54	
BSP	Geetanjali Naragoni	2,237	2.33	
AIMIM	Syed Zahuruddin	2,233	2.33	
IND	Mechineni Kishan Rao	714	0.74	{{{change}}}
IND	A. V. K. Chaitanya	682	0.71	{{{change}}}
Majority		20,461	21.33	
Turnout		97,496	52.1	

== See also ==
- Secunderabad Cantonment Assembly constituency
- List of constituencies of Telangana Legislative Assembly
