= Marri Chenna Reddy =

Indian politician (1919–1996)

Marri Channa Reddy
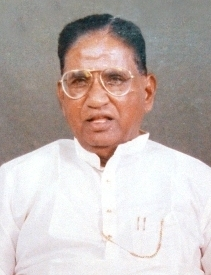
- Official portrait of Chenna Reddy

12th Governor of Tamil Nadu
- In office 31 May 1993 – 2 December 1996
- Chief Minister: J. Jayalalithaa; M. Karunanidhi
- Preceded by: Bhishma Narain Singh
- Succeeded by: Krishan Kant (Additional Charge)

10th Governor of Rajasthan
- In office 5 February 1992 – 31 May 1993
- Chief Minister: Bhairon Shekhawat
- Preceded by: Sarup Singh (acting)
- Succeeded by: Dhanik Lal Mandal (additional charge)

12th Governor of Punjab
- In office 21 April 1982 – 7 February 1983
- Chief Minister: Darbara Singh
- Preceded by: Amin ud-din Ahmad Khan
- Succeeded by: Surjit Singh Sandhawalia

6th Chief Minister of Andhra Pradesh
- In office 3 December 1989 – 17 December 1990
- Governor: Kumudben Joshi; Krishan Kant
- Preceded by: N. T. Rama Rao
- Succeeded by: Nedurumalli Janardhana Reddy
- Constituency: Sanathnagar
- In office 6 March 1978 – 11 October 1980
- Governor: Sharda Mukherjee; K. C. Abraham
- Preceded by: Jalagam Vengala Rao
- Succeeded by: Tanguturi Anjaiah
- Constituency: Medchal

16th Governor of Uttar Pradesh
- In office 25 October 1974 – 1 October 1977
- Chief Minister: Hemwati Nandan Bahuguna; N. D. Tiwari; Ram Naresh Yadav
- Preceded by: Akbar Ali Khan
- Succeeded by: Ganpatrao Devji Tapase

5th Union Minister of Steel
- In office 16 March 1967 – 24 April 1968
- Prime Minister: Indira Gandhi
- Preceded by: Tribhuvan Narain Singh
- Succeeded by: Prakash Chandra Sethi

7th Union Minister of Mines
- In office 16 March 1967 – 24 April 1968
- Prime Minister: Indira Gandhi
- Preceded by: Tribhuvan Narain Singh
- Succeeded by: Prakash Chandra Sethi

Member of Parliament, Rajya Sabha
- In office 27 March 1967 – 26 November 1968
- Preceded by: Kasu Vengala Reddy
- Succeeded by: R. Narasimha Reddy
- Constituency: Andhra Pradesh

Member of Legislative Assembly Andhra Pradesh
- In office 1989–1992
- Preceded by: Sripathi Rajeshwar Rao
- Succeeded by: Marri Shashidhar Reddy
- Constituency: Sanathnagar
- In office 1978–1982
- Preceded by: Sumitra Devi
- Succeeded by: Singireddy Uma Venkataramana Reddy
- Constituency: Medchal
- In office 1962–1968
- Preceded by: Constituency Established
- Succeeded by: M. Manik Rao
- Constituency: Tandur
- In office 1957–1962
- Preceded by: Andhra Pradesh Legislative Assembly Created
- Succeeded by: A. Ramaswamy
- Constituency: Vikarabad

Member of Legislative Assembly Hyderabad State
- In office 1952-1956
- Preceded by: Constituency Established
- Succeeded by: Andhra Pradesh Assembly Created
- Constituency: Vikarabad

Personal details
- Born: 13 January 1919 Peddamangalaram Village, Moinabad, Rangareddy district, Atraf-i-Balda, Hyderabad State (now in Telangana, India)
- Died: 2 December 1996 (aged 77) Hyderabad
- Party: Indian National Congress
- Spouse: Marri Savithri Devi
- Children: 4 including Marri Shashidhar Reddy

Marri Chenna Reddy (13 January 1919 – 2 December 1996) was an Indian politician active in several states. He was the 6th Chief Minister of Andhra Pradesh from 1978 to 1980 and from 1989 to 1990. He also served as the governor of Uttar Pradesh (1974–1977), governor of Punjab (1982–1983), governor of Rajasthan from February 1992 to May 1993, and governor of Tamil Nadu from 1993 until his death. He was a leader of Indian National Congress Party.

Reddy was among the stalwarts who headed the Telangana movement of Andhra Pradesh in the late 1960s. He also has the credit of being one of the youngest ministers; He became a minister of Andhra Pradesh at the age of 30.

== Electoral history ==
Year	Constituency	Party	Votes	Opponent		Result	Margin
1952	Vikarabad	INC	—	—	—	Won	—
1957	Vikarabad	INC	—	—	—	Won	—
1962	Tandur	INC	—	—	—	Won	—
1967	Tandur	INC	—	—	—	Won	—
1978	Medchal	INC(I)	—	—	—	Won	—
1989	Sanathnagar	INC(I)	47,988	TDP	S. Rajeswar	Won	~2,000

== Governor history ==
S.No.	State	From	To
1	Uttar Pradesh	25 October 1974	1 October 1977
2	Punjab	21 April 1982	7 February 1983
3	Rajasthan	5 February 1992	31 May 1993
4	Tamil Nadu	31 May 1993	2 December 1996

== Early life ==
Marri Chenna Reddy was born to Marri Lakshma Reddy and Shankaramma on 13 January 1919 in Siripuram village (currently in Marpally Mandal), Atraf-i-Balda, Hyderabad State. He obtained his MBBS degree in 1941. He was the founder of Andhra Yuvajana Samiti and Students Congress. He was associated with several student, youth, social, educational, literary and cultural organisations. He edited a weekly for about two years and has also contributed articles to leading dailies and Journals.

== Political life ==
He took active part in the political struggle in the erstwhile Hyderabad State and in 1942 was the General Secretary of Andhra Mahasabha (which was a precursor of the State Congress). In 1946, he became a member of the Standing Committee of the State Congress and General Secretary of Hyderabad City Congress. He was one of the founders and as well General Secretary of the Ideological K.M.P. Group in the Congress. He was General Secretary of the Andhra Provincial Congress Committee for several years and a member of the P.C.C Working Committee for 30 years.

=== Tenure as Member of Legislature and Parliament ===
In 1950, Reddy was nominated to the Provisional Parliament and was appointed Whip of Congress Parliamentary Party. He was elected member of the Hyderabad Legislative Assembly in the first General Elections and from 1952 to 1956 was Minister for Agriculture and Food, Planning and Rehabilitation in Hyderabad State. As Minister he held the Indian Delegation to the World Conference of Agriculturists held in Rome under the auspices of the F.A.O. in 1953. Subsequently, in 1955, he represented India as the Deputy Leader of the Indian Delegation to F.A.O. Conference in Rome.

He opposed Telangana merger with Andhra State and was one of the four signatories to Gentleman's agreement after which Andhra Pradesh state formed.

He was elected to the Andhra Pradesh Legislative Assembly again from Vikarabad constituency. During 1957–62, he was a member of the Public Accounts Committee, twice Chairman of the Estimates Committee and Chairman of the Andhra Pradesh Regional (Telangana) Development Committee in State Legislative Assembly. In 1962 he was again elected, now from Tandur Constituency, and was Minister for Planning and Panchayat Raj and later for Finance, Commercial Taxes and Industries. In 1967, he was again returned to the Legislative Assembly and was Minister for Finance, Education and Commercial Taxes. He resigned the State Ministry on his appointment as Minister for Steel, Mines and Metals in the Union Cabinet (1967–68). Subsequently, in April 1967, he was elected to the Rajya Sabha.

As Minister for Steel and Mines, he introduced several reforms to improve production and brought about decontrol of distribution of steel and coal. At the invitation of the British Government he visited the U.K for talks on steel industry and other allied matters. He resigned from the Union Cabinet in April 1968.

=== Role in the First Telangana Movement ===
Reddy took an active part in several public movements and played a notable role in the split of the Congress political party. He also a took an active role in the movement for a separate Telangana State. Chenna Reddy became president of the Telangana Praja Samithi, then a popular youth movement, so as to politicalize the movement. This party supporting the separation secured the popular mandate in terms of winning 11 Loksabha seats (out of 14 seats). As head of the movement for separate Telangana he made a significant contribution in resolving the issues. He is credited for drafting of the Six Point Formula in 1971. This was later incorporated as 'New Deal for Telangana' in the Congress Manifesto when the elections to the Andhra Pradesh Assembly took place in 1972.

=== Tenure as Governor of Uttar Pradesh ===
In 1974, Reddy accepted the office of Governor of Uttar Pradesh, the most populous State of the country on a reported personal plea of Indira Gandhi made that she required Reddy's assistance to help her as the Governor of Uttar Pradesh, her home State. However this is widely seen as a reward for ending the Separate Telangana Movement. As Chancellor for the state Universities, he set a practice of conferring Honorary Degrees on great scholars and renowned scientists from others parts of the country, particularly, from the South. He also administered the state when it came under President's rule within 55 days of him taking office. He sought advice from leaders of repute and public men like Nirmal Chandra Chaturvedi, CB Gupta and Ali Zaheer to cleanse the state administration.

=== Tenure as Chief Minister ===
He was twice the chief minister of Andhra Pradesh. Reddy successfully brought the congress party to power on two occasions. He was the Pradesh Congress Committee President. He has also been Governor of Uttar Pradesh (during president rule in the mid-1970s), Rajasthan, Punjab, Tamil Nadu and Pondicheri. He was actually the person who created the peace process and eradication of terrorism in Punjab while being the Governor there.

== Personal life ==
Reddy was married to M. Savitri Devi and had two sons and a daughter. His younger son, Marri Shashidhar Reddy, was Vice Chairman of National Disaster Management Authority (NDMA) with a Union Cabinet status; he was also a four-time MLA from Sanathnagar.

Reddy arrived in Hyderabad on 1 December 1996 from Chennai to attend his grandson's wedding. He was taken to a private hospital in the city after he complained of a chest pain at around midnight before he slipped into coma. He died at 7 a.m. the following day there.

In an obituary, author Parsa Venkateshwar Rao wrote of Reddy: "Marri Chenna Reddy was an eternal rebel in Andhra politics. He never toed any line, be it a party or a leader. He dared his cautious peers, and did not hesitate to antagonise them though he never had permanent enemies. He held positions of power on his own terms, and lost them too for the same reasons."

== See also ==
- Dr. Marri Channa Reddy Human Resource Development Institute of Telangana
