= Mylargadda =

- Neighbourhood
- Location in Telangana, India Mylargadda (Telangana) Mylargadda (India)
- Coordinates: 17.4277°N 78.5148°E
- Country: India
- State: Telangana
- District: Hyderabad
- Metro: Hyderabad

Government
  - Body: Cantonment Board, Secunderabad

Languages
  - Official: Telugu
- Time zone: UTC+5:30 (IST)
- PIN: 500 061
- Vehicle registration: TG
- Lok Sabha constituency: Secunderabad
- Vidhan Sabha constituency: Cantonment
- Planning agency: Cantonment Board, Secunderabad
- Website: telangana.gov.in

Mylargadda is a residential suburb of Secunderabad, India.

It is predominantly a middle-class neighbourhood and is half kilometer away from the Secunderabad Junction railway station.

== Transport ==
Mylargadda is well connected by TSRTC buses to all parts of the city.

The closest MMTS Train station is at Sitaphalmandi.

== Schools ==
There are many schools for all budgets, more so for middle-class people.

The neighbourhoods surrounding are Chilkalguda, Padmarao Nagar, Sitaphalmandi, Namalagundu.
