= Marri Shashidhar Reddy =

Indian politician (born 1949)

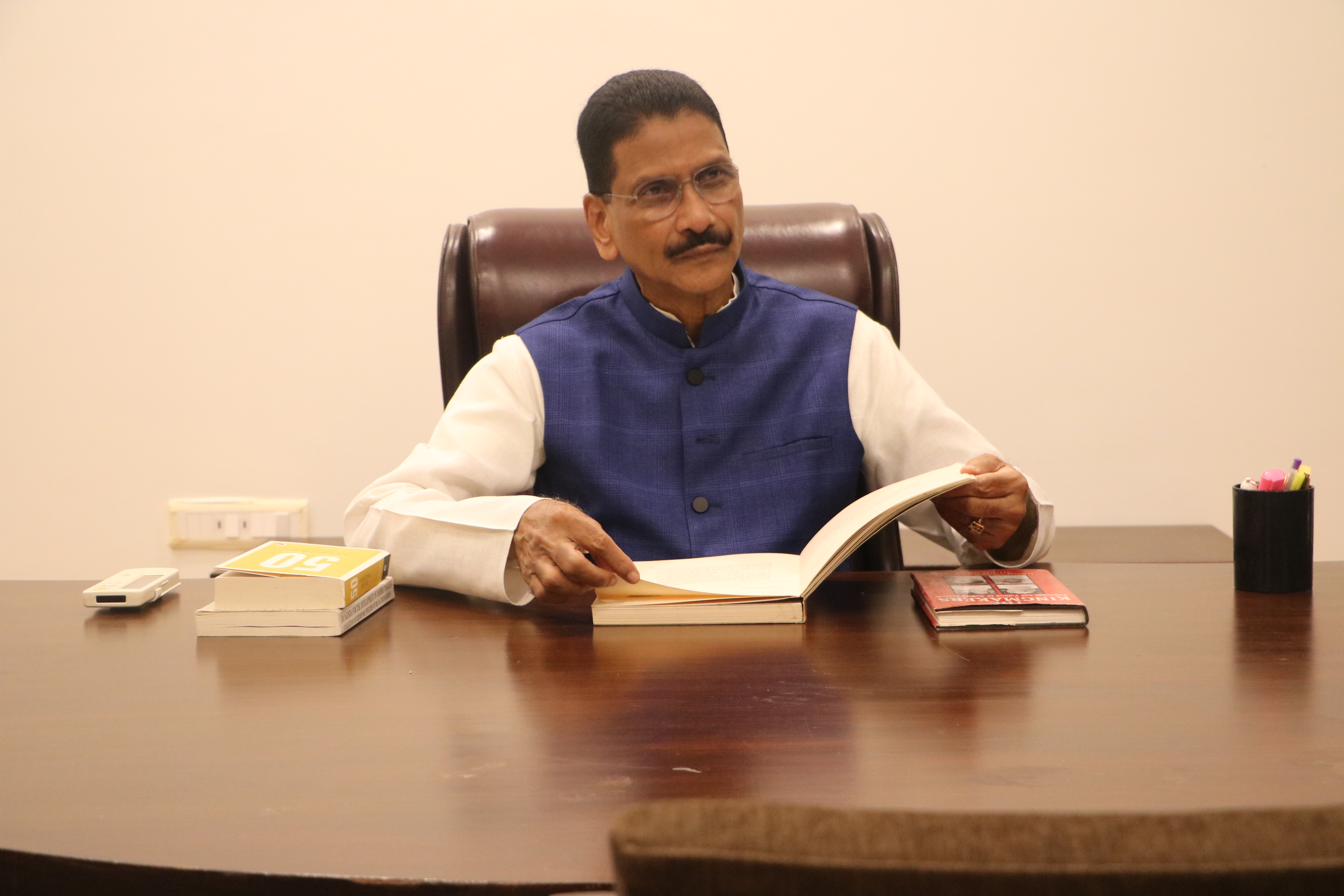
- Marri Shashidhar Reddy at his Office

Member of Legislative Assembly Andhra Pradesh
- In office 2004–2014
- Preceded by: Sripathi Rajeshwar Rao
- Succeeded by: Telangana Assembly Created
- Constituency: Sanathnagar
- In office 1992 - 1999
- Preceded by: Marri Chenna Reddy
- Succeeded by: Sripathi Rajeshwar Rao
- Constituency: Sanathnagar

Personal details
- Born: 24 August 1949 (age 77) Hyderabad, Hyderabad State, India (Now Telangana, India)
- Party: Bhartiya Janata Party (2022–present)
- Other political affiliations: Indian National Congress (1992 - 2022)
- Spouse: Indira Reddy
- Children: 2 sons, 1 daughter
- Parent(s): Marri Chenna Reddy, Savitri Devi
- Education: University of Delhi; Andhra Pradesh Agricultural University; Kansas State University

Marri Shashidhar Reddy (born 24 August 1949) is an Indian politician. He has been active both at the state level and national level politics in India. He was elected as an MLA four times from Sanathnagar (Assembly constituency). The first time he contested by-polls was in 1992 and he was elected again three times (1994, 2004, 2009) from the same constituency.

In 2005, he became part of the high-powered National Disaster Management Authority, he has been responsible for formulating the Government of India guidelines that would ensure prompt and effective response to cyclones in any part of India. He was also the Convener of the National level Task Force on Naxal violence set up in 2004. On 19 November 2022 Marri Shashidhar Reddy was expelled from congress party for six years for anti-party activities. He joined BJP on 25 November 2022 in New Delhi in presence of Party President J. P. Nadda, Union ministers Sarbananda Sonowal, G. Kishan Reddy along with senior leaders of Telangana.

== Electoral history ==
| Year | Constituency | Party | Votes | Opponent | | Result | Margin |
|---|---|---|---|---|---|---|---|
| 1992 (By-poll) | Sanathnagar | INC | — | TDP | — | Won | — |
| 1994 | Sanathnagar | INC | 30,813 | TDP | S. Rajeshwar | Won | 14,923 |
| 1999 | Sanathnagar | INC | 43,537 | TDP | S. Rajeshwar | Lost | -16,031 |
| 2004 | Sanathnagar | INC | 51,710 | TDP | S. Rajeshwar | Won | 9,546 |
| 2009 | Sanathnagar | INC | 37,994 | TRS | T. Padma Rao | Won | 8,325 |
| 2014 | Sanathnagar | INC | 23,820 | TDP | Talasani Srinivas Yadav | Lost | -32,655 |
| 2023 | Sanathnagar | BJP | 30,730 | BRS | Talasani Srinivas Yadav | Lost | -41,827 |

== Early life ==
Marri Shashidhar Reddy was born in Hyderabad, India to former Chief Minister of Andhra Pradesh, Marri Chenna Reddy.

== Education ==
Shashidhar Reddy earned a Master’s degree in Agronomy from the Kansas State University, USA, in 1973. Earlier he was an (ICAR) Merit Scholar as an under-grad graduated from Andhra Pradesh Agricultural University, Hyderabad and graduated in 1971 with a B.Sc. (Ag) degree. Earlier, he was also briefly a student of BA (English Honours) at St. Stephen's College, University of Delhi, in 1967 and a student of All Saints High School (Hyderabad).

== Career ==
He was convener of the National level Task Force on Naxal violence in 2004. The Task Force's objective was to study the causes of Naxal violence in India. The Task Force submitted its report in 2005.

As a member of the National Disaster Management Agency since 2005, he has been responsible for formulating guidelines that would ensure prompt and effective response to cyclones in any part of India. He is also responsible for delineating the role insurance and microfinance can play in preparing the people before a natural disaster strikes and rehabilitating the people affected by a natural disaster.

He was an invited participant of the Shimla Chintan Shivir (High Level brainstorming Session) organised by All India Congress Committee (AICC) in 2003. He participated in an International Training Seminar on "Political Strategies" at Sintra, Portugal in 1994, which was organised by the Friedrich Naumann Foundation of Germany. He represented India as a member of Government of India delegation to the second UN commission on "Sustainable Development", at New York in 1994. He is closely connected to the World Bank funded Cyclone Emergency Reconstruction Project, which was established after the 1990 cyclone hit the coastal areas of Andhra Pradesh.

He has been a water activist and has especially taken up water issues like the optimal utilisation of water from Godavari and Krishna rivers.

== Personal life ==
Marri Shashidhar Reddy is married to Indira Reddy and has three children.
