= Asafnagar =

Asafnagar was a 'Crown' taluk in the Atraf-i-Balda district Hyderabad State also known as the Gharbi or western taluk with an area including jagirs of 402 square miles.

The population in 1901 was 56,928 compared with 47,264 in 1891. The taluk contains 97 villages of which 33 are Jagir and Asafnagar population 1,694 is the headquarters. The land revenue in 1901 was 2 lakhs. The taluk is composed of sandy soils and is well supplied with tanks.

The paigah taluk of Faridabad with 31 villages a population of 8,446 and an area of about 126 square miles lies to the west.
