= T. Padma Rao Goud =

Indian politician (born 1954)

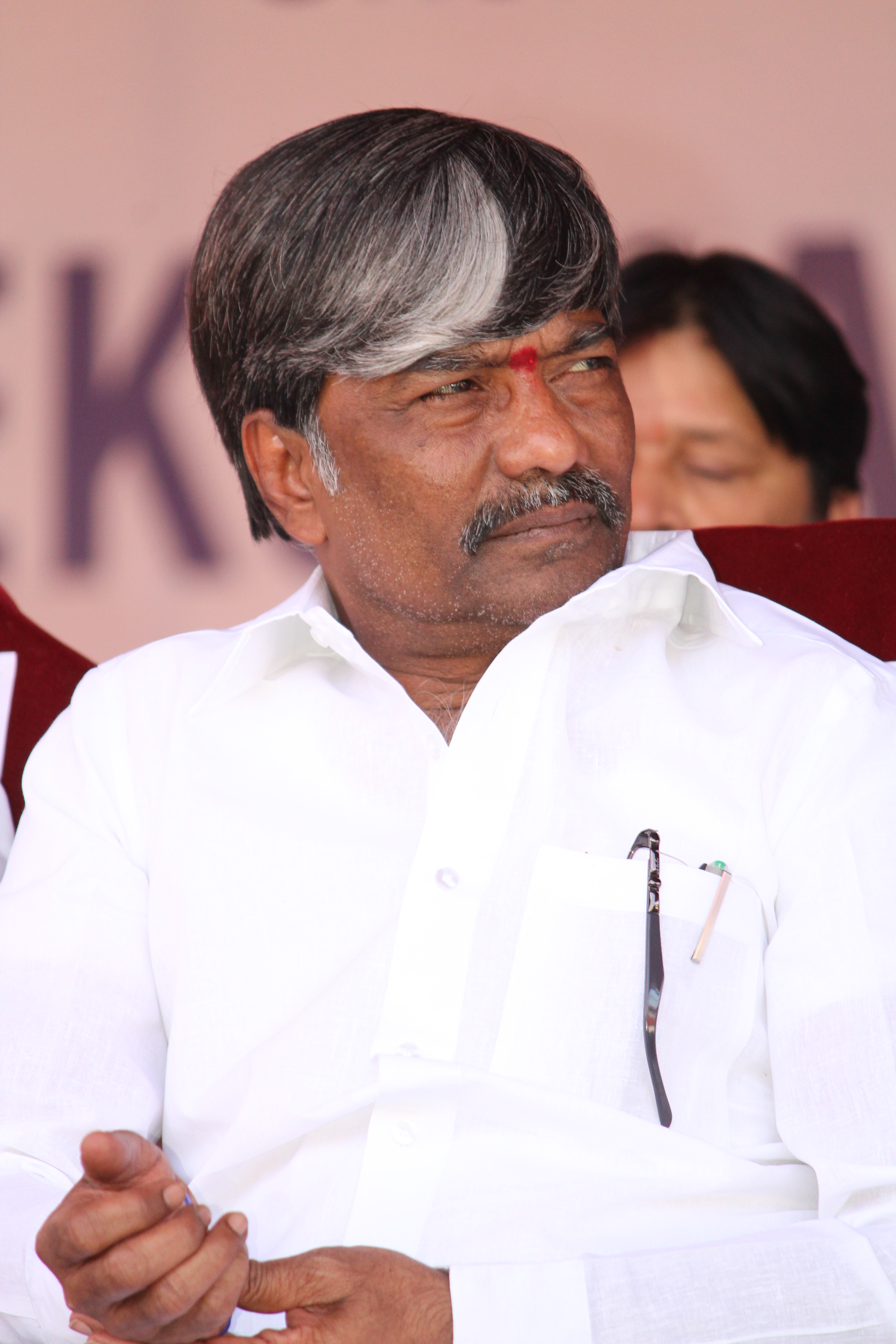

2nd Deputy Speaker of the Telangana Legislative Assembly
- In office 24 Feb 2019 – 6 December 2023
- Preceded by: Padma Devender Reddy, Bharat Rashtra Samithi
- Succeeded by: Jatoth Ram Chander Naik

Member of Legislative Assembly, Telangana
- Incumbent
- Assumed office 2 June 2014
- Preceded by: Assembly established
- Constituency: Secunderabad

Member of Legislative Assembly, Andhra Pradesh
- In office 2004–2008
- Preceded by: Talasani Srinivas Yadav
- Succeeded by: Talasani Srinivas Yadav
- Constituency: Secunderabad

Personal details
- Born: Theegulla Padma Rao Goud; 7 May 1954 (age 72) Secunderabad, Hyderabad, Andhra Pradesh (present-day Telangana, India)
- Party: Bharat Rashtra Samithi
- Spouse: Swarupa Rani
- Children: 6

Theegulla Padma Rao Goud (born 7 May 1954) is an Indian politician from Telangana. He served as the 2nd Deputy Speaker of the Telangana Legislative Assembly from 24 February 2019 and Member of the Telangana Legislative Assembly from Secunderabad Constituency from 2 June 2014. He was the minister of Excise, Sports, Prohibition from 2014 to 2018 in Telangana.

== Early life ==
Padma Rao was born on 7 April 1954 in Secunderabad. He studied till Intermediate in Govt. Junior College, SP Road, Secunderabad.

== Political career ==
He entered politics after education and served as a Municipal Councillor in 1984 & 2001 (Hyderabad Municipal Corporation). Later in 2001 he joined Bharat Rashtra Samithi. He won from Secunderabad Assembly constituency in 2004 Assembly Election. In 2009 Assembly election he lost from Sanathnagar Assembly constituency to Congress candidate Marri Shashidhar Reddy.

In 2014 Telangana Assembly Election he was re-elected from Secunderabad Assembly constituency.

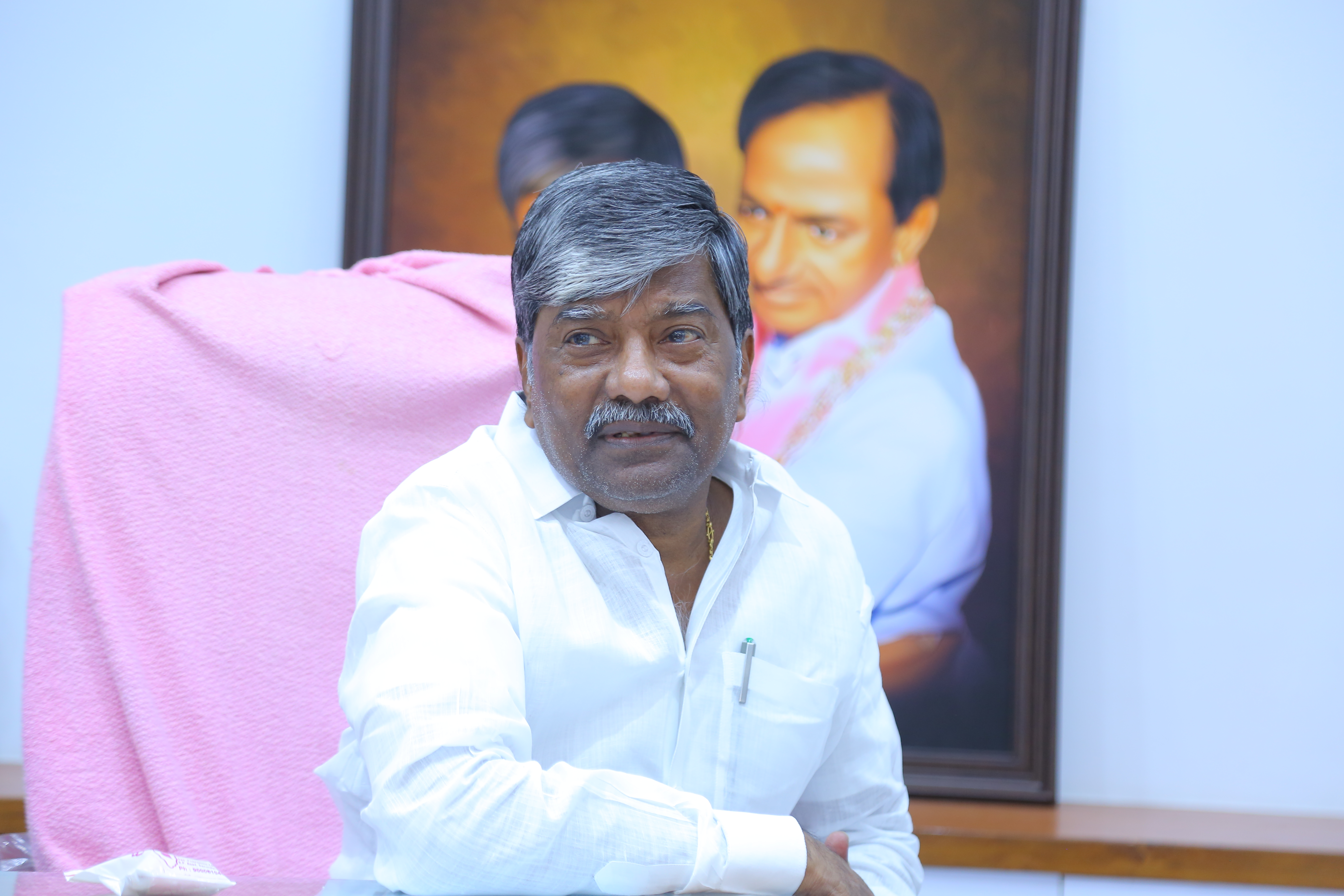
T Padma Rao Goud, Deputy Speaker in his office

Electoral history of T. Padma Rao Goud
Year	Constituency	Party	Result
2004	Secunderabad	TRS	Won
2008	Secunderabad	TRS	Lost
2009	Sanathnagar	TRS	Lost
2014	Secunderabad	TRS	Won
2018	Secunderabad	TRS	Won
2023	Secunderabad	BRS	Won
2024	Secunderabad (LS)	BRS	Lost

== Personal life ==
He is married to Swarupa Rani and has 4 sons and 2 daughters, namely Kishore Goud, Kiran Goud, Rameshwar Goud, Trinethra Goud, Manisha Goud and Mounika Goud.

Political offices
Preceded by Position Established	Excise and Prohibition, Sports and Youth Services Minister of Telangana; 2014–present	Incumbent
