= Namalagundu =

- Neighbourhood
- Location in Telangana, India Namalagundu (India)
- Coordinates: 17.4247°N 78.5136°E
- Country: India
- State: Telangana
- District: Hyderabad
- Metro: Hyderabad

Government
  - Body: Greater Hyderabad Municipal Corporation, Secunderabad

Languages
  - Official: Telugu
- Time zone: UTC+5:30 (IST)
- PIN: 500 061
- Vehicle registration: TG
- Lok Sabha constituency: Secunderabad
- Vidhan Sabha constituency: Secunderabad
- Planning agency: Greater Hyderabad Municipal Corporation, Secunderabad
- Website: www.ghmc.gov.in

Namalagundu is a residential suburb of Secunderabad, India. The area is located about 1.5 km from the Secunderabad Station. The neighbourhood surroundings of Namalagundu include Chilkalguda, Sitaphalmandi, Warasiguda and Mylargadda.

== Etymology ==
Originally, there were two huge boulders; one sitting a top of a small hill and another boulder bisecting the road towards Sithafalmandi and Mylargadda. The first boulder has completely disappeared, which was behind the current Hanuman Temple and replaced by dwellings. The second boulder was where the current Lord Kalyana Venkateswara temple stands. Both these boulders had huge three vertical lines or Namalu (Telugu), and the boulders are called Gundu (Telugu), hence the name Namalagundu.

== Transport ==
A good transport facility is available to the locality. TSRTC buses – 86, 86J, 139, 107J and 107V/K from Secunderabad station pass through the area.

The closest MMTS Train station are Secunderabad and Sitaphalmandi.

== Education ==
Schools in the locality include Nehru High School, Vedic Vidyalam High School and Amaravathi Grammar High School.
