= Sanathnagar Assembly constituency =

Constituency of the Telangana legislative assembly in India

Coordinates: 17.457°N 78.442°E

Sanathnagar
- Constituency No. 62 for the Telangana Legislative Assembly
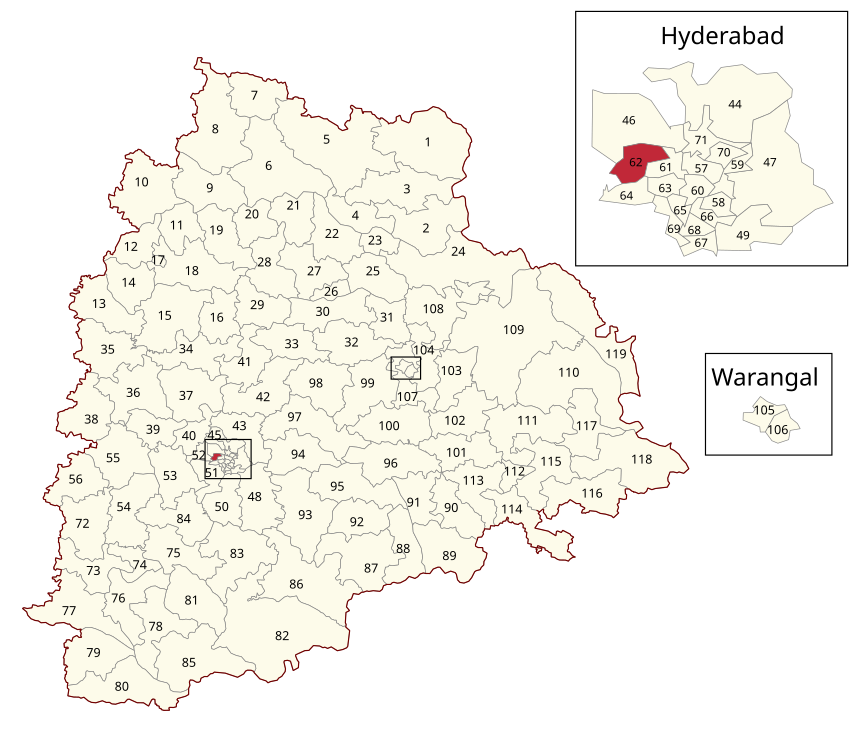
- Location of Sanathnagar Assembly constituency within Telangana

Constituency details
- Country: India
- Region: South India
- State: Telangana
- District: Hyderabad
- Lok Sabha constituency: Secunderabad
- Established: 1978
- Total electors: 2,20,969
- Reservation: None

Member of Legislative Assembly
- 3rd Telangana Legislative Assembly
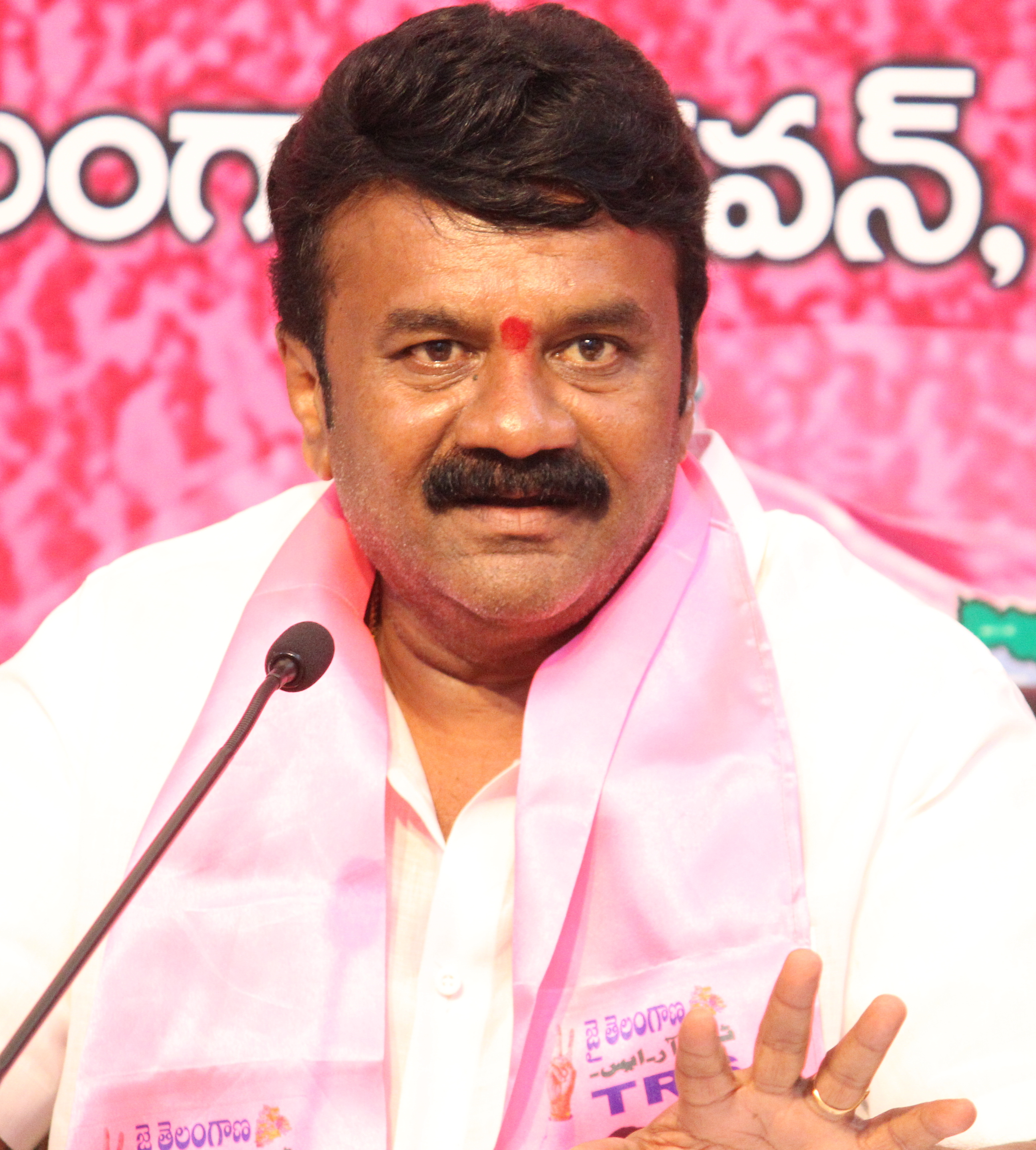
- Incumbent Talasani Srinivas Yadav
- Party: BRS
- Elected year: 2023

Sanathnagar Assembly constituency is a constituency of the Telangana Legislative Assembly, India. It is one of the 15 constituencies in Hyderabad. It is part of Secunderabad Lok Sabha constituency.

Talasani Srinivas Yadav, the former Animal Husbandry, Fisheries and Cinematography Minister of Telangana, is representing the constituency.

== Extent of the constituency ==
The assembly constituency presently comprises the following neighbourhoods:

Neighbourhood
Sanathnagar
Ameerpet
S.R.Nagar
Padmarao Nagar
Monda Market
Balkampet
Pan bazar
General Market
Begumpet (part)
Rastrapathi Road (part)

== Members of Legislative Assembly ==
| Year | Member | Political Party |
Andhra Pradesh
| 1978 | S. Ramdass | Indian National Congress (I) |
| 1983 | Katragadda Prasuna | Telugu Desam Party |
| 1985 | Sripathi Rajeshwar Rao | Telugu Desam Party |
| 1989 | Marri Chenna Reddy | Indian National Congress |
| 1992 by-election | Marri Shashidhar Reddy | Indian National Congress |
| 1994 | Marri Shashidhar Reddy | Indian National Congress |
| 1999 | Sripathi Rajeshwar Rao | Telugu Desam Party |
| 2004 | Marri Shashidhar Reddy | Indian National Congress |
| 2009 | Marri Shashidhar Reddy | Indian National Congress |
Telangana
| 2014 | Talasani Srinivas Yadav | Telugu Desam Party |
| 2018 | Talasani Srinivas Yadav | Telangana Rashtra Samithi |
| 2023 | Talasani Srinivas Yadav | Bharat Rashtra Samithi |

== Election results ==
=== Telangana Legislative Assembly election, 2023 ===
Telangana Assembly Elections, 2023: Sanathnagar (Assembly constituency)
| Party | Candidate | Votes | % | ±% |
|---|---|---|---|---|
| BRS | Talasani Srinivas Yadav | 72,557 | 56.57 | |
| BJP | Marri Shashidhar Reddy | 30,730 | 23.96 | |
| INC | Kota Neelima | 22,492 | 17.54 | |
| NOTA | None of the Above | 1040 | 0.81 | |
| Majority | | 41,827 | 32.61 | |
| Turnout | | 1,28,263 | | |
| BRS hold | | Swing | | |

=== Telangana Legislative Assembly election, 2018 ===
Telangana Assembly Elections, 2018: Sanathnagar (Assembly constituency)
| Party | Candidate | Votes | % | ±% |
|---|---|---|---|---|
| TRS | Talasani Srinivas Yadav | 66,464 | 55.52 | |
| TDP | Kuna Venkatesh Goud | 35,813 | 29.91 | |
| BJP | Bhawarlal Varma | 14,247 | 11.90 | |
| NOTA | None of the Above | 1,464 | 1.22 | |
| Majority | | 30,651 | 25.61 | |
| Turnout | | 1,19,722 | 52.29 | |
| TRS gain from TDP | | Swing | | |

=== Telangana Legislative Assembly election, 2014 ===
Telangana Assembly Elections, 2014: Sanathnagar (Assembly constituency)
| Party | Candidate | Votes | % | ±% |
|---|---|---|---|---|
| TDP | Talasani Srinivas Yadav | 56,475 | 45.27 | |
| TRS | Dande Vithal | 29,014 | 23.26 | |
| INC | Marri Shashidhar Reddy | 23,820 | 19.09 | |
| YSRCP | Vellala Ram Mohan | 5,833 | 4.68 | |
| LSP | Hymavati Sagi | 3,975 | 3.19 | |
| AAP | Ambika Krishna | 1,235 | 0.99 | |
| NOTA | None of the above | 1,041 | 0.83 | |
| Majority | | 27,461 | 22.01 | |
| Turnout | | 1,24,746 | 52.87 | |
| TDP gain from INC | | Swing | | |

== See also ==
- Sanathnagar
- List of constituencies of Telangana Legislative Assembly
