= Talasani Srinivas Yadav =

Indian politician

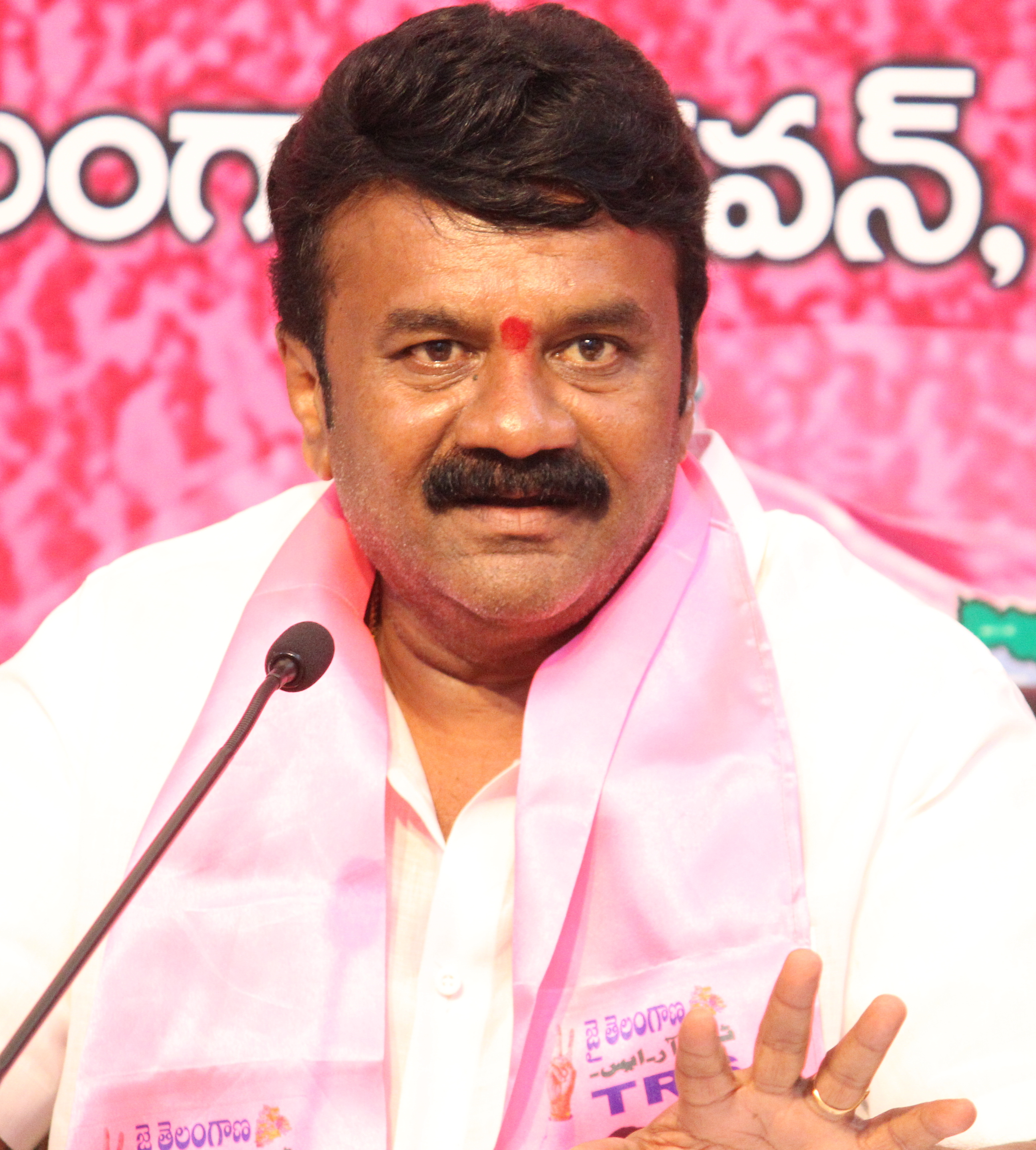
- Talasani in 2018

Member of the Telangana Legislative Assembly
- Incumbent
- Assumed office 2 June 2014
- Preceded by: Marri Shashidhar Reddy
- Constituency: Sanathnagar

Minister for Animal Husbandry, Fisheries and Cinematography Government of Telangana
- In office 19 February 2019 – 3 December 2023
- Governor: E. S. L. Narasimhan; Tamilisai Soundararajan
- Chief Minister: K. Chandrashekar Rao
- Preceded by: office established
- Succeeded by: Komatireddy Venkat Reddy
- In office December 2014 – December 2018
- Governor: E. S. L. Narasimhan
- Chief Minister: K. Chandrashekar Rao
- Preceded by: portfolio not allocated to any minister
- Succeeded by: Himself

Member of Legislative Assembly United Andhra Pradesh
- In office 2008–2009
- Preceded by: T. Padma Rao
- Succeeded by: Jayasudha
- Constituency: Secunderabad
- In office 1994–2004
- Preceded by: Mary Ravindra Nath
- Succeeded by: T. Padma Rao Goud
- Constituency: Secunderabad

Personal details
- Born: 6 October 1965 (age 61) Hyderabad, Andhra Pradesh (now in Telangana), India
- Party: Bharat Rashtra Samithi (since 2016)
- Other political affiliations: Telugu Desam Party (until 2016)
- Spouse: Suvarna
- Children: 3

Talasani Srinivas Yadav (born 6 October 1965) is an Indian politician who is the former Minister for Animal Husbandry, Fisheries and Cinematography of Telangana since 2019. He is an MLA from Sanathnagar Assembly constituency. Previously he represented from Secunderabad Assembly Constituency.

== Early life ==
Talasani Srinivas Yadav was born on 6 October 1965, in Hyderabad, Telangana to Venkatesham Yadav and Lalitha Bai. Talasani completed his intermediate education. He is married to Suvarna, and the couple has one son and two daughters.

== Political life ==
Talasani entered into politics by contesting as Monda Market corporator in 1986 as Janata party candidate but lost. Srinivas Yadav joined Telugu Desam Party and contested from Secunderabad Assembly constituency in 1994 and won as MLA. In 1999 assembly elections, Talasani defeated Mary Ravindranath of Congress Party and became Minister for labour, tourism in the Andhra Pradesh Government in Nara Chandrababu Naidu's Cabinet.

In 2004 Assembly elections he was defeated by T. Padma Rao Goud who has contested from Telangana Rastra Samithi. Srinivas Yadav again contested in 2008 Assembly by elections defeating his nearest Congress Party candidate Pitla Krishna by 18,067 votes and in 2009 Andhra Pradesh assembly elections he contested from same constituency and lost to Cine Actress and Congress candidate Jayasudha by nearly 5000 votes. In 2005 he became State Telugu Yuvata President.

After formation of Telangana State Srinivas Yadav contested in 2014 Assembly Elections from Sanath Nagar Constituency from Telugu Desam Party and won. Later on, he joined Telangana Rashtra Samithi Party in presence of Chief Minister Kalvakuntla Chandra Shekar Rao and taken Charge as Commercial Taxes Minister. In 2018 he contested from Sanath Nagar Constituency from TRS party and was elected as MLA and taken oath as State cabinet minister on 19 February 2019.

== Electroral History ==
Year	Constituency	Party	Votes	%	Opponent	Party	Votes	%	Result	Margin	%
1994	Secunderabad	TDP	61,431	62.10	Mary Ravindranath	INC	30,813	31.15	Won	+30,618	+30.95
1999	Secunderabad	TDP	59,572	54.89	Mary Ravindranath	INC	43,537	40.12	Won	+16,035	+14.77
2004	Secunderabad	TDP	42,164	39.85	T. Padma Rao Goud	TRS	51,710	48.87	Lost	-9,546	-9.02
2008 (Note: By-election)	Secunderabad	TDP	50,031	51.20	Pitla Krishna	INC	31,964	32.71	Won	+18,067	+18.49
2009	Secunderabad	TDP	40,833	32.50	Jayasudha	INC	45,306	36.06	Lost	-4,473	-3.56
2014	Secunderabad	TDP	56,475	45.42	Dande Vithal	TRS	23,820	19.15	Won	+32,655	+26.27
2018	Sanathnagar	TRS	66,464	55.52	Kuna Venkatesh Goud	TDP	35,813	29.91	Won	+30,651	+25.61
2023	Sanathnagar	BRS	72,557	56.57	Marri Shashidhar Reddy	BJP	30,730	23.96	Won	+41,827	+32.61

== Cabinet roles ==
Tenure	Ministry	Chief Minister	Government / State
1999 – 2001	Minister for Labour and Employment	N. Chandrababu Naidu	United Andhra Pradesh
2001 – 2004	Minister for Tourism, Culture, and Archaeology	N. Chandrababu Naidu	United Andhra Pradesh
2014 – 2016	Minister for Commercial Taxes and Cinematography	K. Chandrashekar Rao	Telangana
2016 – 2018	Minister for Animal Husbandry, Fisheries, Dairy Development, and Cinematography	K. Chandrashekar Rao	Telangana
2019 – 2023	Minister for Animal Husbandry, Fisheries, Dairy Development, and Cinematography	K. Chandrashekar Rao	Telangana

== See also ==
- List of constituencies of Telangana Legislative Assembly
- Secunderabad (Assembly constituency)
