= Sarf-e-Khas =

Crown lands across the princely state of Hyderabad belonging to the Nizam family

The Sarf-e-Khas are crown lands across the princely state of Hyderabad belonging to the Nizam family covering 10,000 square miles. The Dar-ul-Shifa was the headquarters for Sarf-e-Khas during the reign of Nizam II. Sarf-e-Khas land revenue and the resources were used to serve the royalty exclusively, until the princely state's merger with Indian Union in 1948. It was taken over by the Government of India after the accession and paid the last Nizam and his family a sum of one crore per annum. The Nizam had a private army known as the Sarf-e-Khas army.

== History ==
Formerly the Diwani revenue officials were also responsible for the revenue collection of the Sarf-e-Khas lands within their jurisdiction, but during the time of His Highness Nasir-ud-Daulah some territories were detached from the Dewani and taken under his personal management. The reason for this was the great irregularity that used to occur in making payments from the treasury, which, owing to the system of revenue collection at the time, was never regular. The lands thus reserved by His Highness for his personal use were called Sarf-e-Khas. Sarf-e-Khas is a compound word of Arabic origin and means a personal or private expenditure.

== Area ==
These are distinct from the Dewani or State lands. They cover an area of about 10,000 square miles consisting of an entire district of seven talukas known as the Atraf-i-Balda (surrounding the city of Hyderabad) and eleven talukas in the mofusil distributed in the districts of Aurangabad, Parbhani, Bidar, Beed, Kalaburagi and Osmanabad with a total population of about one lakh, the revenues of which, go into His Exalted Highnesses privy purse.

== Revenue ==
The nature of the Sarf-i-Khas talukas is the same as that of crown lands of European sovereigns. Additions were also made from time to time. His Highness Nasir-ud-Daulah purchased some lands and added to these talukas. When Begums of the palace and relations of His Highness who had purchased makthas and held lands died without leaving any heir such property was also added to the talukas.

The Sarf-i-Khas territories thus formed yielding at present an annual revenue of a crore of rupees or more are administered by a special officer known as the Sadar-ul-Moham, working directly under the orders of His Exalted Highness. The revenue receipts are not deposited in the Government Treasury nor are accounts submitted to the Accountant General. All the cash remittances from the districts on Sarf-i-khas account went to the Superintendent of the Sarf-i-Khas, a special Sarf-i-Khas official, who controls the disbursements under orders. The Sarf-i-khas stamps were separate and all Sarf-i-khas accounts are submitted through the Sarf-i-khas Secretary.

During the reigns of their Highnesses Nasir-ud-Daulah and Afzal-ud-Daulah, the Sarf-i-khas talukas were under their immediate management. Amirs and other influential persons were appointed Taluqdars who received fixed proportions of revenue for supervision beside contingent charges. They deducted their dues from the revenues of the talukas and remitted the balance to the Sarf-i-khas Treasury. On the demise of His Highness Nawab Afzul-ud-Dowla Bahadur in 1869 Nawab Sir Salar Jung I the regent and the late Amir-i-Kabir, Nawab Rafee-uddin Khan Umdul-ul-Mulk Shams-ul-Umra Bahadur as co-regent, handed over the estates for management as a temporary measure to the Dewani officers. During this period two districts were formed out of the Sarf-e-khas talukas namely Atraf-i-Baldah surrounding the city of Hyderabad and Palam. Sir Salar Jung introduced in them the system which he had already established in the Dewani districts.

After His Highness Mahboob Ali Khan ascension to the throne on 5 February 1884, His Highness issued orders to the Sarf-e-khas Secretary that papers connected with the Sarf-e-khas, which used to be submitted to the Prime Minister should be submitted for orders to himself as was the practice during the previous Nizams. A Sarf-e-Khas Board was formed on 10 October 1885 and His Highness became president on 26 December 1885. As His Highness was not only the President of the Board, but also the owner of the Sarf-e-khas estate, His Highness had power to sanction proposals submitted to the Board in their entirety or in a modified form or to reject them altogether. His Exalted Highness who was taking an increasing interest in the administration of the Dominions examines and revises the financial statements and personally supervises the administration of the Sarf-i-Khas districts.

== Administration ==
For administrative purposes the Sarf-i-Khas Department is divided into two sections viz Receipts and Expenditure. Of these two sections, the Receipts, as already stated, is incorporated, to all intents and purposes, with the general administration of the country there being special officer only for the Atraf-i-Balda District.

The other section Expenditure is administrated by a special Sarf-e-Khas official, and it was this branch of the Sarf-i-Khas administration, that the late Sir Salar Jung I contemplated placing under a Board of which His Highness was to be chairman, the members being selected from among the principal nobles of the city.
