= Moti Nagar, Hyderabad =

Moti Nagar
- Neighbourhood
- Location in Telangana Moti Nagar (Telangana) Moti Nagar (India)
- Coordinates: 17.446°N 78.420°E
- Country: India
- State: Telangana
- Region: Deccan
- District: Hyderabad
- City: Hyderabad
- Time zone: UTC+5:30 (IST)
- PIN: 500114
- Official languages: Telugu, Urdu

Moti Nagar is a neighborhood of Hyderabad the capital of Telangana. It is 12 kilometres (7.5 mi) away from both the centre of the city and Secunderabad. It is near to many locations with Ameerpet being the main suburb. It houses many television artists and business personalities as it has many film studios in the vicinity.
