= Boudha Nagar =

- neighbourhood
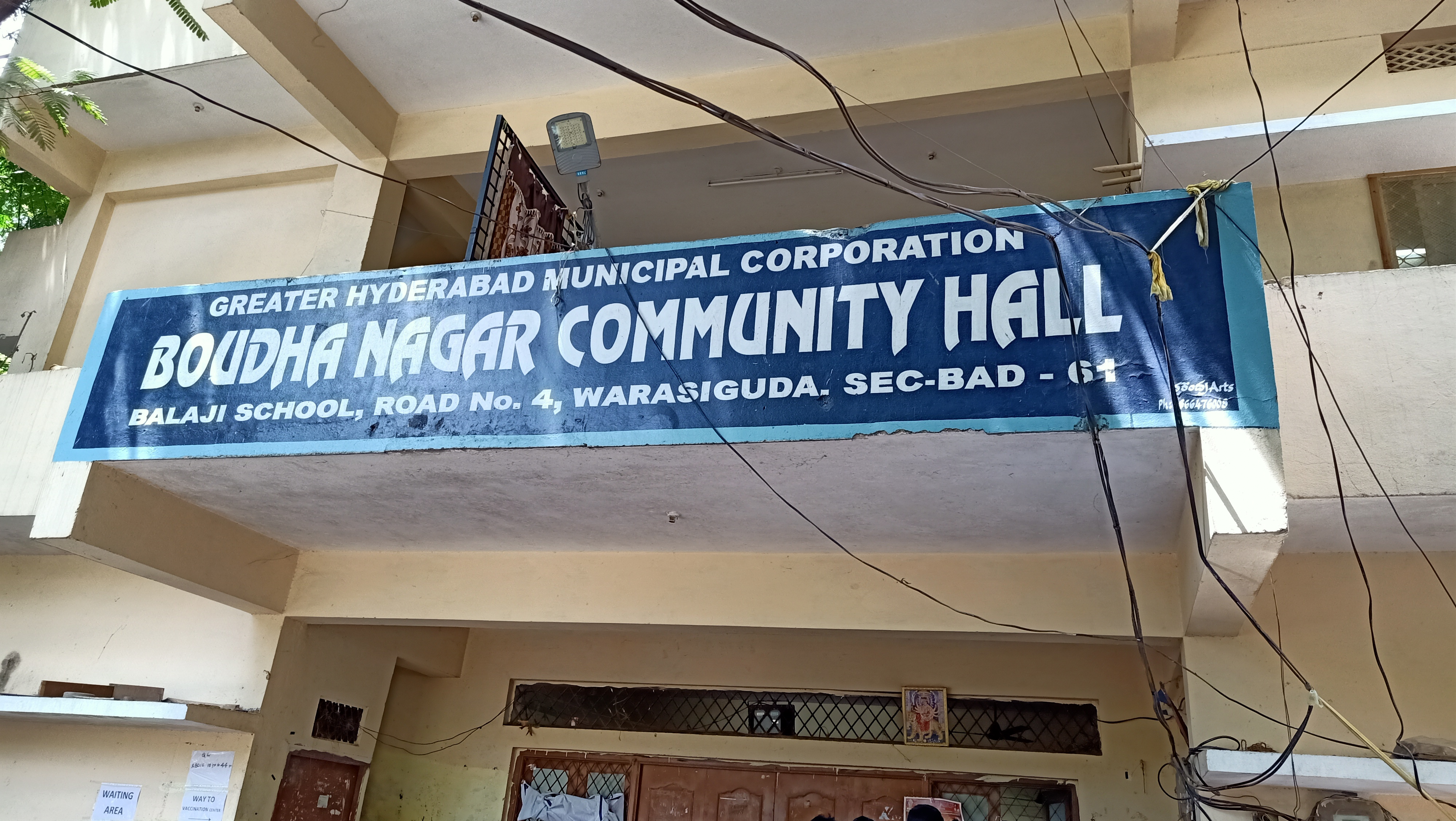
- Boudha Nagar Community Hall

- Location in Telangana, India Boudha Nagar (Telangana) Boudha Nagar (India)
- Coordinates: 17.4182241°N 78.512281°E
- Country: India
- State: Telangana
- District: Hyderabad
- Metro: Hyderabad

Government
  - Body: GHMC

Languages
  - Official: Telugu
- Time zone: UTC+5:30 (IST)
- PIN: 500 061
- Lok Sabha constituency: Secunderabad
- Vidhan Sabha constituency: Secunderabad
- Planning agency: GHMC

Boudha Nagar is one of the suburbs in Secunderabad, Telangana, India. The postal code is 500061. It is a residential area around 1.5 km from the Osmania University campus. The name is from Buddha (derived from Gautama Buddha). It is believed that the name is derived from an old Buddhist temple. It comes under Chilkalguda Police Station.

The people there have been living since 50 years ago and the area has become quite old when compared to upcoming and new areas. Boudhanagar is surrounded by an arts college in the east and Warsiguda in the north, Ambernagar in the south and Mohmad Guda in the west. Boudhanagar comprises ten streets from east to west beginning with the main road of the arts college. There is a Durga temple adjacent to the Buddhist temple. The temple is busy during festivals as many devotees visit during festivals. There is a very old Ram temple there as well.

Boudhanagar comes under GHMC, and Secunderabad Loksabha and assembly constituency. Boudhanagar is diverse, with Hindus, Muslims and Christians, although majority is Hindus. Congress, TDP and TRS and BJP political parties are strong in this area.

== Education ==
The international cycling stadium (velodrome) next to Professor G Ramireddy center for distance education is very close to Boudhanagar. Jawahar Vidya Nilayam E.H School, Jyothi model school, Netaji school and Balaji school are a few private schools in the area. A small community hall is present, next to Balaji school is managed by GHMC. These schools typically are polling booths during elections. In almost every street Ganesh statues are erected during Ganesh Chaturthi.

== Health care ==
The few clinics in the area are Dr Kesav reddy's clinic, Dr Raghuramulu's Clinic and Dr Iqbal Ali Baig's clinic near Kausar masjid.

== Transport ==
=== Road ===
The closest bus stops that connect Boudhanagar are Warasiguda, Arts College and Jamia Osmania. Buses run in this route connecting Secunderabad railway station to Koti.

- Secunderabad station - Dilsukhnagar

=== Railway ===
There is a rail-route that connects Secunderabad and Kacheguda (these are major railway stations nearby). MMTS trains that run on this route are

- Lingampally - Faluknama
- Lingampally - Medchal
