= Chilkalguda =

Chilakalguda Chikliguda
- Neighbourhood
- Location in Telangana, India Chilakalguda (India)
- Coordinates: 17.421°N 78.499°E
- Country: India
- State: Telangana
- District: Hyderabad
- Metro: Hyderabad

Government
  - Body: Greater Hyderabad Municipal Corporation

Languages
  - Official: Telugu
- Time zone: UTC+5:30 (IST)
- PIN: 500 061
- Vehicle registration: TG 10
- Lok Sabha constituency: Secunderabad
- Vidhan Sabha constituency: Secunderabad
- Planning agency: Greater Hyderabad Municipal Corporation
- Website: telangana.gov.in

Chilakalguda is a residential neighbourhood of Secunderabad, India.

It is predominantly a middle-class neighbourhood with rich of culture, and is located half kilometer away from the Secunderabad Junction railway station. Residential Quarters for Employees of South Central Railway are located here. Gandhi Statue is one of the predominant places in the area. The neighbourhoods of Chilakalguda include Padmarao Nagar, Sitaphalmandi, Namalagundu, Parsigutta and Mylargadda.

== Transport ==
Chilakalguda is well connected by road. TSRTC buses shuttles from the area to all parts of the city. The closest MMTS station is at Sitaphalmandi. The nearest Metro Station to Chilakalguda is Secunderabad East Metro Station.

== Culture ==
A few of spiritual sites in the locality include Hanuman temple, Katta Maisamma-Nalla Pochamma temple, Jamia Masjid, Masjid Ahle-Hadith, EIDGAH and the C.S.I. Wesley Church.

== Festivals ==
Ganesh Festival, Bonalu spirits roar high in this Area.

== Infrastructure ==
In 2019, the road expansion of in the area was taken up. There is a small Urban Primary Health Centre which caters to the residents of the area. In May 2025, an approach road to the Government Primary School was cleared.
