= Padmarao Nagar =

Padmarao Nagar padmarao nagar
- Neighbourhood
- Location in Hyderabad, India
- Coordinates: 17.423333°N 78.510489°E
- Country: India
- State: Telangana
- District: Hyderabad
- Metro: Hyderabad

Government
  - Body: Ward 6, GHMC

Languages
  - Official: Telugu
- Time zone: UTC+5:30 (IST)
- PIN: 500 025
- Lok Sabha constituency: Secunderabad
- Vidhan Sabha constituency: Sanathnagar
- Planning agency: GHMC
- Civic agency: Ward 6, GHMC

Padma Rao Nagar, sometimes also called PR Nagar, is a locality in Hyderabad, India, named after Diwan Bahadur Padma Rao Mudaliar. It is bordered by Musheerabad, Chilkalguda, Sitaphalmandi and Bhoiguda areas of Secunderabad in the southern Indian state of Telangana.

== Commercial area ==
Padmarao Nagar is the location of the Gandhi Medical College.
