= Sripathi Rajeshwar Rao =

Indian politician

Minister Government of Andhra Pradesh

Personal details
- Died: 28 April 2013
- Political party: Telugu Desam Party

Sripathi Rajeshwar Rao (died 28 April 2013) was an Indian politician. He was the founder of the fan association of actor N. T. Rama Rao. Rao served as a minister in the Andhra Pradesh state government for two terms and worked as the chairman of HUDA (Hyderabad Urban Development Authority), Setwin, and other corporations. He was the Andhra Pradesh MLA for the Musheerabad Constituency and MLA for the Sanathnagar Constituency. He was the founder and President of Akhila Bharatha 'NTR' Abhimana Sangham. He was known as "Ajatha Shatruvu," which means "a person with no enemy," due to his popularity among leaders from all political parties.

He has two sons and a daughter.

- Sripathi Sathish kumar is the eldest Son who is into Active Politics. He is one of the key Politician in Hyderabad District and also He is Currently serving as the State President of Telugudesam Party BC Cell in Telangana & Sanathnagar Constituency INCHARGE.

== Death ==
On 28 April 2013, Indian news media reported that Rao had died from kidney failure after a long illness, at the age of 73.
