= Atraf-i-Balda =

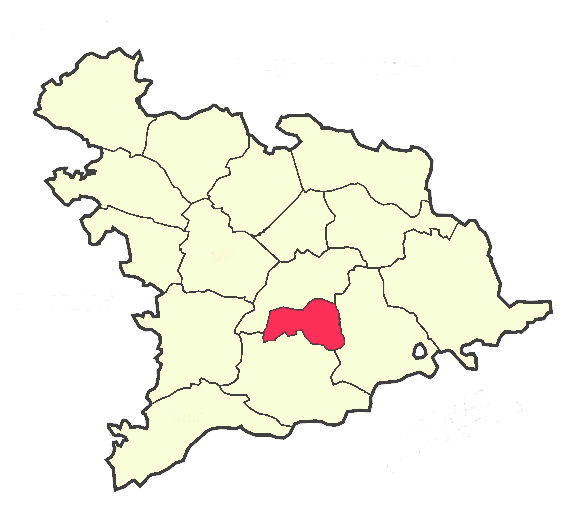
Location of Atraf-i-Baldah district in Hyderabad-State

Atraf-i-Baldah or just Atraf Baldah district was a district in erstwhile Hyderabad State in which the capital city Hyderabad was located. As per the Imperial Gazetteer of 1909, Atraf-i-Baldah was a sarf-i-khas or “crown” district. The district covered 3,399 square miles (8,800 km^{2}) with Hyderabad city then occupying 26 square miles (67 km^{2}). The area of the “crown” lands was 2,040 square miles (5,300 km^{2}) , the rest were jagir. It consisted of seven talukas during the reign of the Nizams, rulers of Hyderabad State. The total revenue from the area went to the private purse of the Nizam known as Sarf-e-Khas.

Atraf-i-Baldah meaning Suburbs of the City. The area was distinct and was in direct control of the Nizams, outside this area was ruled by Jamindars, Jagirdars, landlords etc.

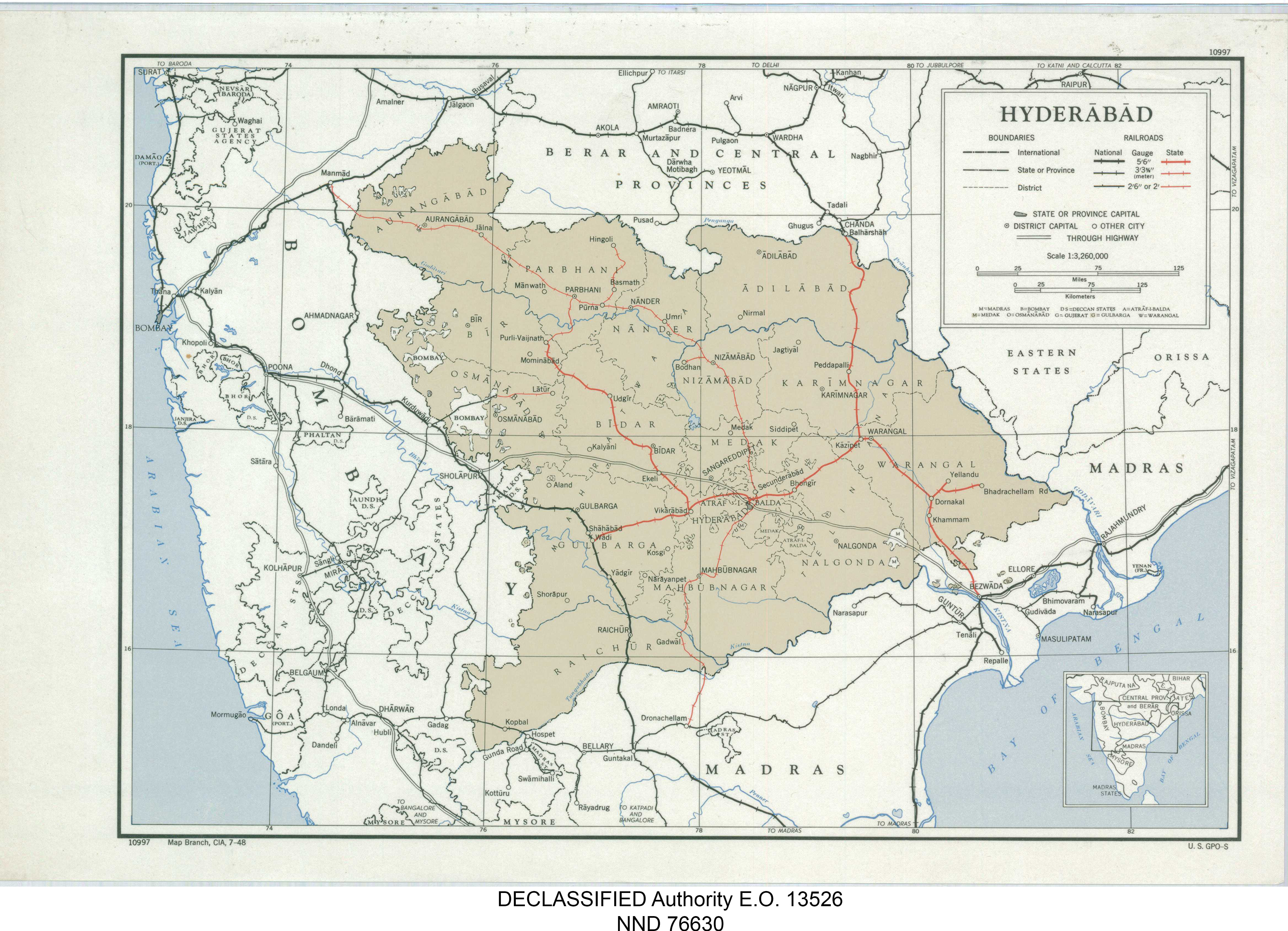
Divisions of Hyderabad State

== Post Operation Polo ==
After the annexation of Hyderabad state in September 1948, Nizam had to hand over the entire land in the district to the new Government in exchange for Privy Purse. Later Atraf-a-Balda district and Baghat district were merged and a new district Hyderabad was formed.

== Division in Atraf-i-Balda district ==
Hyderabad State was made up of sixteen districts. The districts were grouped into four divisions and Atraf-i-Baldah was part of Medak Gulshanabad Division – districts included Atraf-i-Balda (Hyderabad), Mahbubnagar, Medak, Nalgonda (Nalgundah), and Nizamabad districts.

== Atraf-i-Baldah Army ==
The area was under Nizam's private army, Atraf-i-Baldah Army.

== Railway lines ==
The district was well connected by railways by both Nizam's State Railway and the Hyderabad-Godavari Valley line. NGSR covered the district from east to west, with six stations, and the Hyderabad-Godavari Valley line had one station in the district limits. The total length of railways in the district was about 98 miles (158 km)
