= Sitaphalmandi =

- Neighbourhood
- Old era nameboard at Sitaphalmandi railway station

- Location in Telangana, India Sitaphalmandi (Telangana) Sitaphalmandi (India)
- Coordinates: 17.425556°N 78.519225°E
- Country: India
- State: Telangana
- District: Hyderabad
- Metro: Hyderabad

Government
  - Body: Greater Hyderabad Municipal Corporation

Languages
  - Official: Telugu
- Time zone: UTC+5:30 (IST)
- PIN: 500061
- Vehicle registration: TG
- Lok Sabha constituency: Secunderabad
- Vidhan Sabha constituency: Secunderabad
- Planning agency: Greater Hyderabad Municipal Corporation
- Website: telangana.gov.in

Sitaphal Mandi is one of the old suburbs of Secunderabad City in the state of Telangana, India. It is located close to Secunderabad Railway Station and is surrounded by Osmania University in the east, Warasiguda in the south, Secunderabad in the west and Tarnaka in the north. Sitaphalmandi is located about 1.5 km from Secunderabad.

== Etymology ==
The suburb's name comes from the words sitaphal (custard apple) and mandi (market).

== Education ==
Sitaphalmandi has a lot of schools that has been catering for the past 40 years to the students in and around the locality.

English and Foreign Languages University is located close to the railway station.

== Culture ==
Sitaphalmandi has many religious landmarks – two mosques in this area include the one that is close to the railway station, and the other at Chilkalguda. The Hindu temples include Rama Lingeshwara Swamy Temple (Ramalayam), Pochamma Temple, Saibaba Temple (Dattatreya temple). And, also a Gurdwara is located in the area. A recently constructed temple of Sri Kalyana Venkateswara Swamy (Lord Balaji) at Namalagundu on a spiritual rock, has now made the place more famous.

== Transport ==
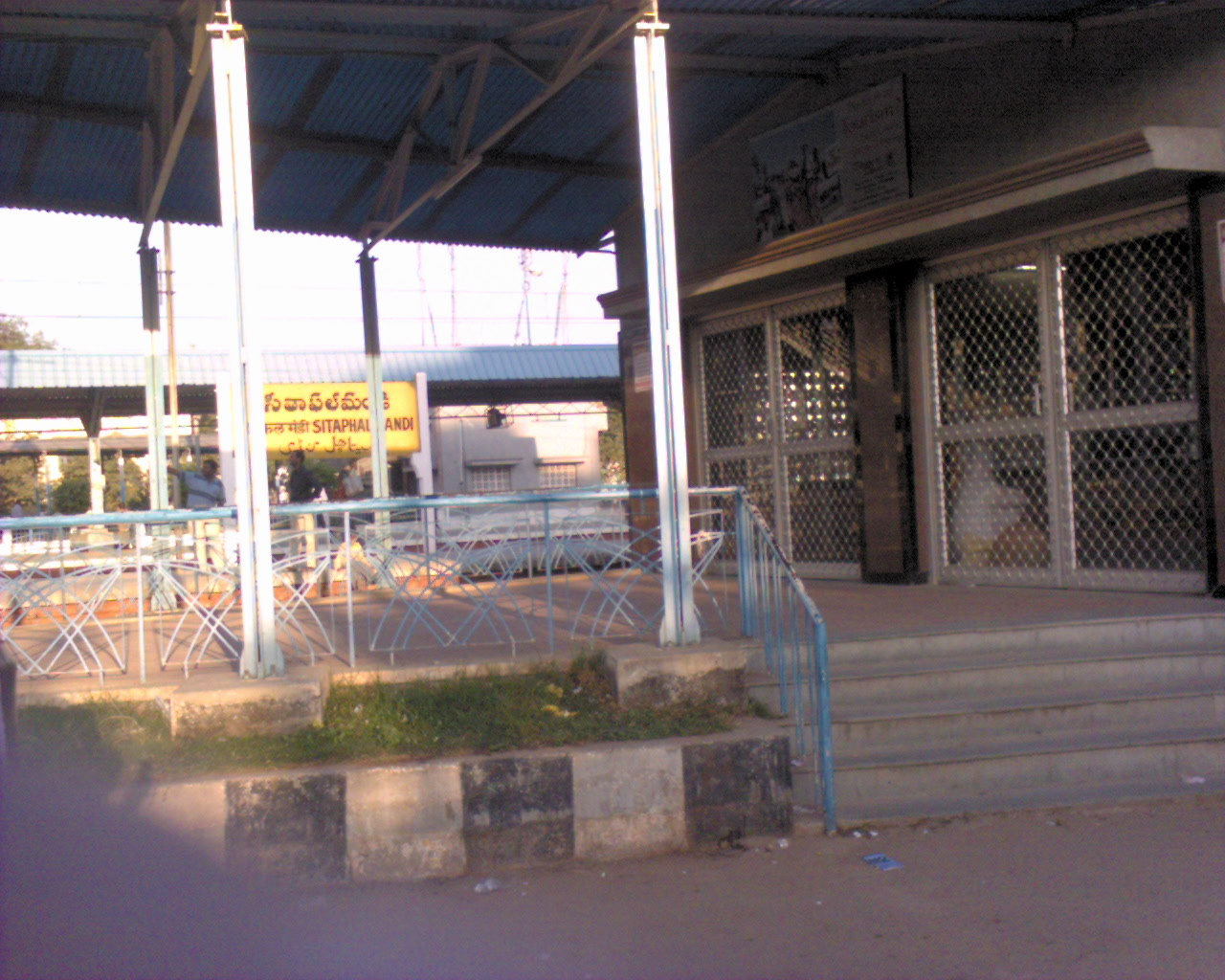
Railway Reservation counter of Sitaphalmandi Railway Station

Sitaphalmandi is well connected with the other localities of Hyderabad and Secunderabad by rail and road. Sitaphalmandi Railway Station is located on the Falaknuma – Secunderabad line of the Hyderabad MMTS, a local train service serving the twin cities of Hyderabad and Secunderabad and thus connecting it to other parts of the city such as Falaknuma, Kachiguda and Lingampally. The buses in the series 86, 107, 57S, 2V, 16S run by TSRTC connect Sitaphalmandi with the areas of Secunderabad, Jamia Osmania, Ramnagar and other parts of the city.

A Rail over bridge (ROB) over the railway tracks was inaugurated on 14 August 2009 by the then Chief Minister of Andhra Pradesh, Dr. Y. S. Rajasekhara Reddy. The bridge was opened after a long gap of thirteen years after works were grounded due to the delay caused by land acquisition problems and various other reasons.
