= Warsiguda =

Warisguda
- Neighbourhood
- Location in Telangana, India Warisguda (Telangana) Warisguda (India)
- Coordinates: 17.418°N 78.513°E
- Country: India
- State: Telangana
- District: Hyderabad
- Metro: Hyderabad
- Ward: ward no.11 circle no 18

Government
  - Body: GHMC

Languages
  - Official: Telugu, Urdu
- Time zone: UTC+5:30 (IST)
- PIN: 500 061
- Lok Sabha constituency: Secunderabad
- Vidhan Sabha constituency: Secunderabad
- Planning agency: GHMC

Warasiguda is one of the neighborhoods in Hyderabad, India. It falls under Chilkalguda Police Station limits, located in the Secunderabad area. It is one of the prominent neighborhoods in this region, and it has a rich history, tied in part to the broader history of Hyderabad and Secunderabad.

== History ==
Warasiguda's establishment and history are not well-documented, Although the Secunderabad region, where Warasiguda is located, was developed during the British colonial period in India. Secunderabad was established as a British cantonment in the late 18th century, around 1806, after the Treaty of Deogaon. As the cantonment grew and expanded, areas like Warasiguda emerged as residential and commercial districts. This transformation happened throughout the 19th and early 20th centuries.

Over the years, Warasiguda evolved from a modest residential area to a bustling neighborhood with a mix of commercial and residential spaces. Its growth was driven by the expansion of the railway network and the general urbanization of Hyderabad and Secunderabad.

== Education ==
Warasiguda is home to several educational institutions that cater to the needs of its residents. These institutions range from primary and secondary schools to colleges and technical institutes. Notable educational establishments in Warasiguda include:

- Warasiguda Government High School: A prominent government-run school providing education to local students.
- St. Ann's College for Women: Located nearby, this college is one of the leading women's colleges in the region, offering a variety of undergraduate and postgraduate courses.

Osmania University which is one of the oldest modern universities in India is at a distance of one kilometer from the area.

A few of schools in this area include Kakatiya Techno School, Jyothi Model High School, Sumitra High School, Jawahar English High School and Balaji High School. Johnson Grammar School (ICSE) and Netaji public high school have been the prominent schools of this area.

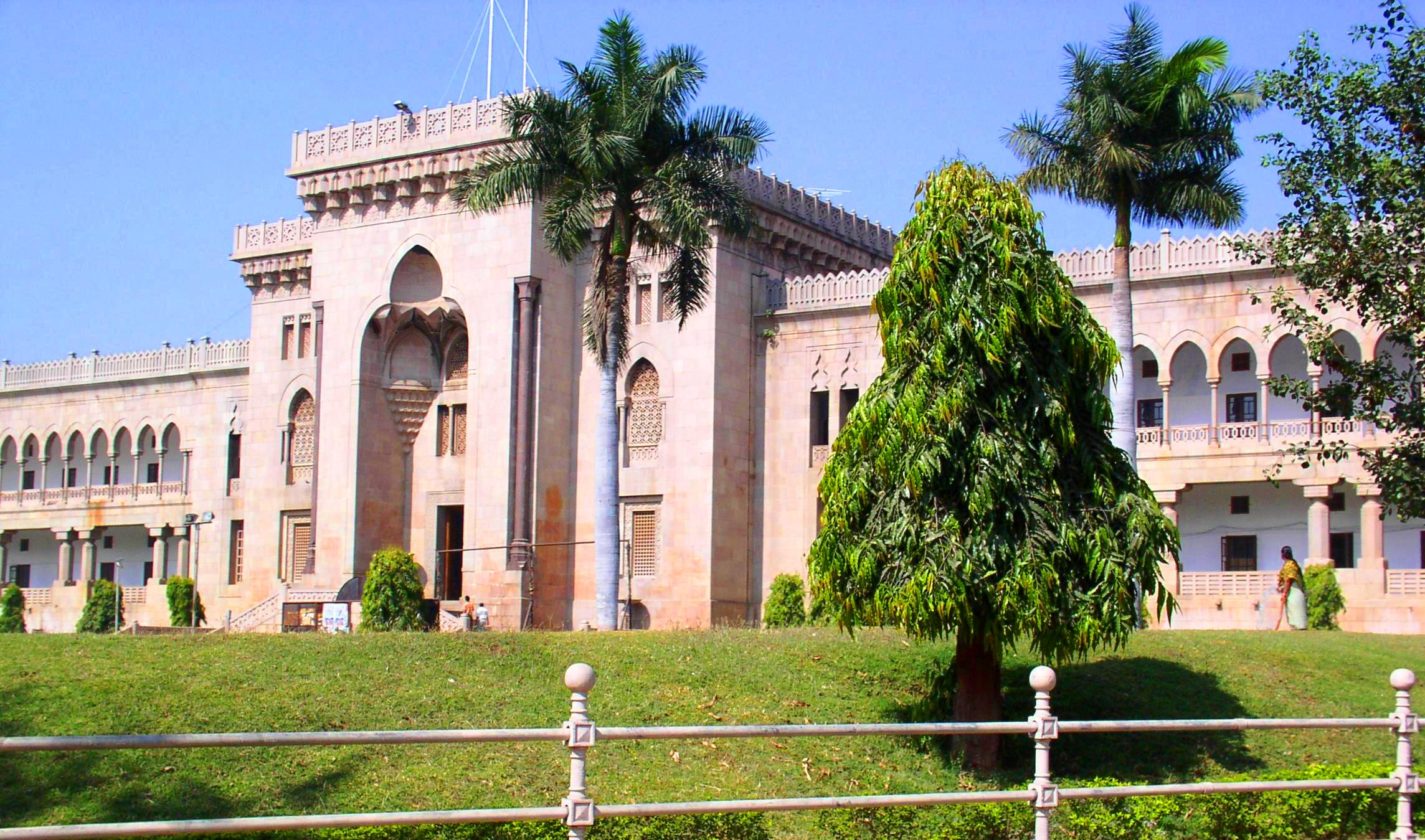
Arts College building on O.U. campus

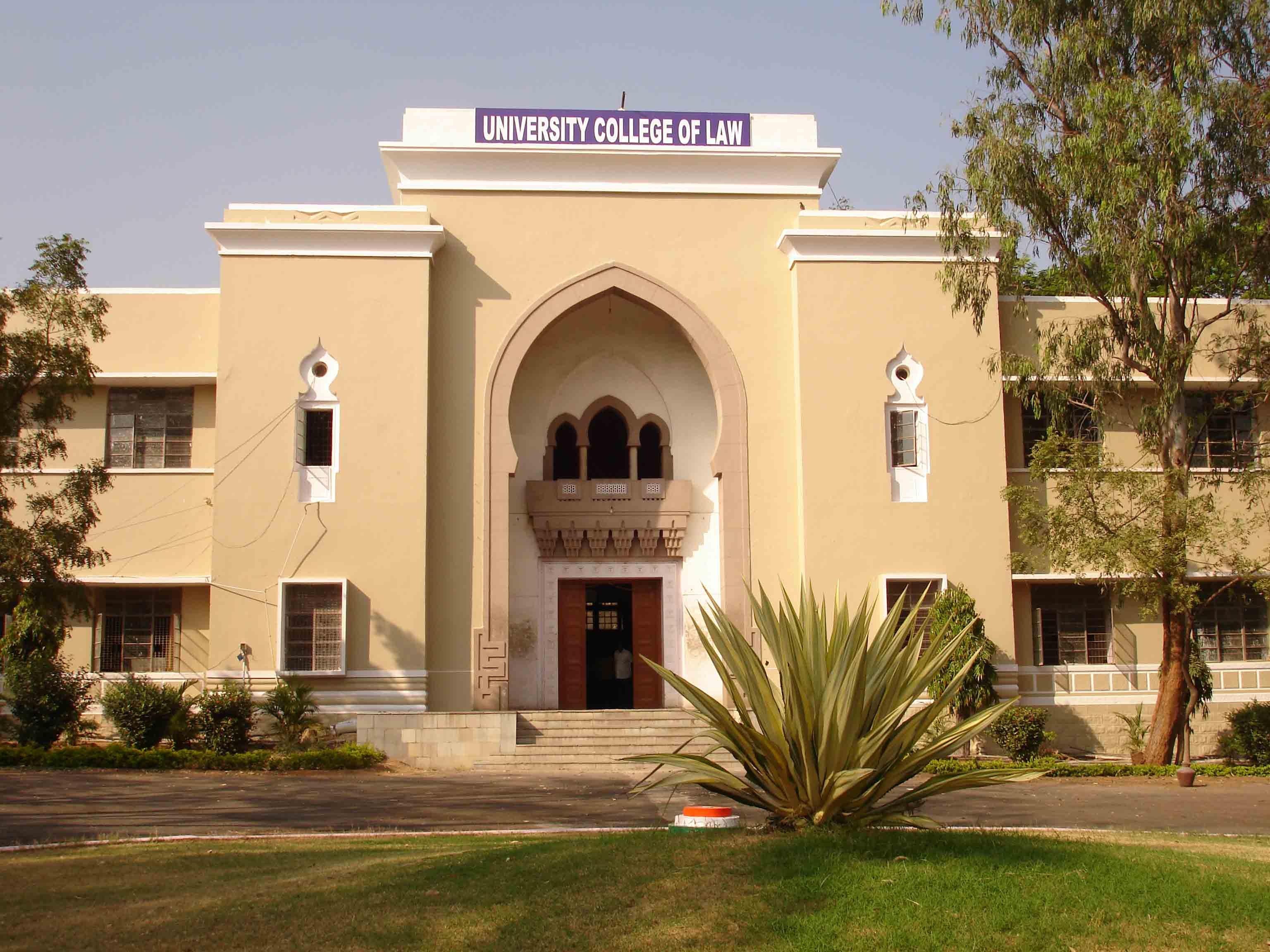
Law College building on O.U. campus

== Transport ==
Warisguda is well-connected to various parts of the city via buses operated by the Telangana State Road Transport Corporation (TSRTC). The 86 bus route primarily runs between Secunderabad and Koti, while the 107J bus route connects Secunderabad with Dilsukhnagar.

For train travel, the nearest Multi-Modal Transport System (MMTS) station is Arts College Railway Station. This station provides frequent train services to destinations like Falaknuma, Lingampally, and Hitech City, offering a convenient transit option for daily commuters.

== Culture & Traditions ==
Warasiguda is home to a variety of religious sites, reflecting the cultural and religious diversity that is typical of Hyderabad and Secunderabad.

- Islamic Places of Worship Several prominent mosques are located in Warasiguda, serving the Islamic community. Notable among these are the Jamia Masjid Al-Kausar and the Masjid-E-Noor-E-Mohammadiya. These mosques are central to the religious and communal life of local Muslims, offering regular prayers, religious education, and community events.
- Hindu Places of Worship Warasiguda also has a number of significant Hindu temples. The Sri Umachandra Mouleshwara Swamy Temple, situated near the Arts College railway station, is dedicated to Lord Shiva and Parvathi Devi. It also hosts idols of other Hindu deities, including Lord Ganesha, Sita Rama, Anjaneya Swamy, and Shirdi Sai Baba. Additionally, the renowned Sri Subrahmanyaswamy Temple and Hanuman Temple are located about one kilometer from Warasiguda, attracting devotees from across the region.

Cultural Diversity Warasiguda's population comprises people from various linguistic and cultural backgrounds, including Telugu, Hindi, and Urdu speakers. This cultural diversity manifests in the neighborhood's vibrant festivals, culinary traditions, and religious practices.

Major festivals like Ganesh Chaturthi, Diwali, and Eid-ul-Fitr are celebrated within the community. Bringing together residents from different backgrounds in harmony. Along with mosques and temples, Warasiguda also has churches that serve its Christian residents, further highlighting multiculturalism.

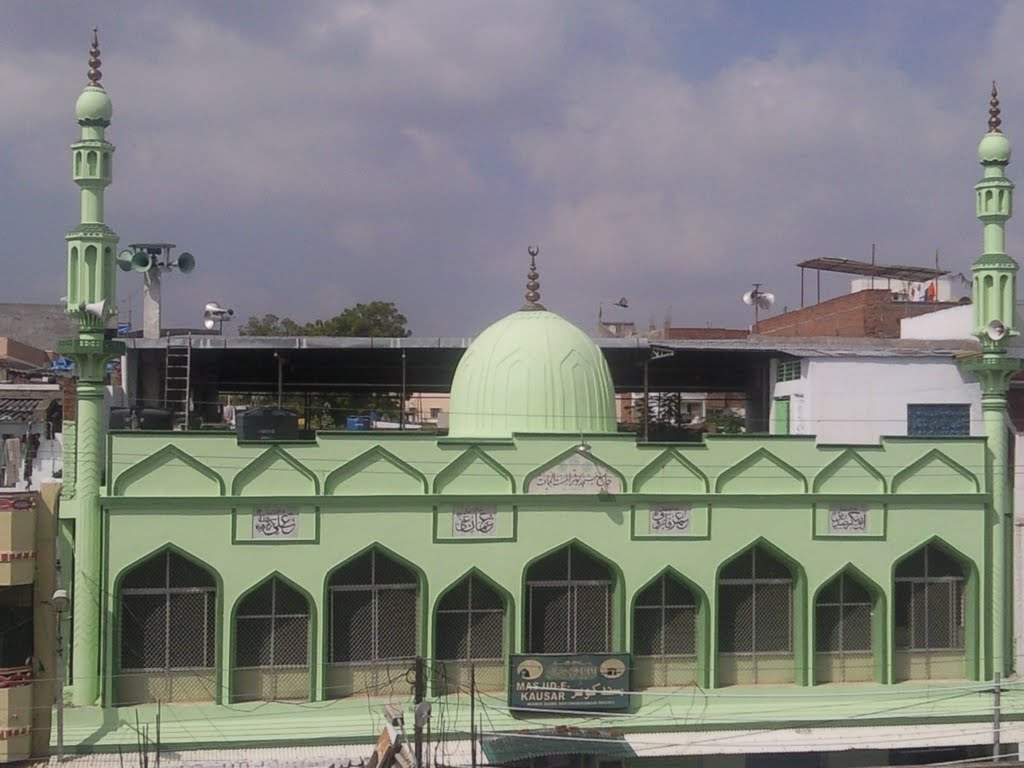
  Masjid-e-Kausar in Warasigdua (2016)
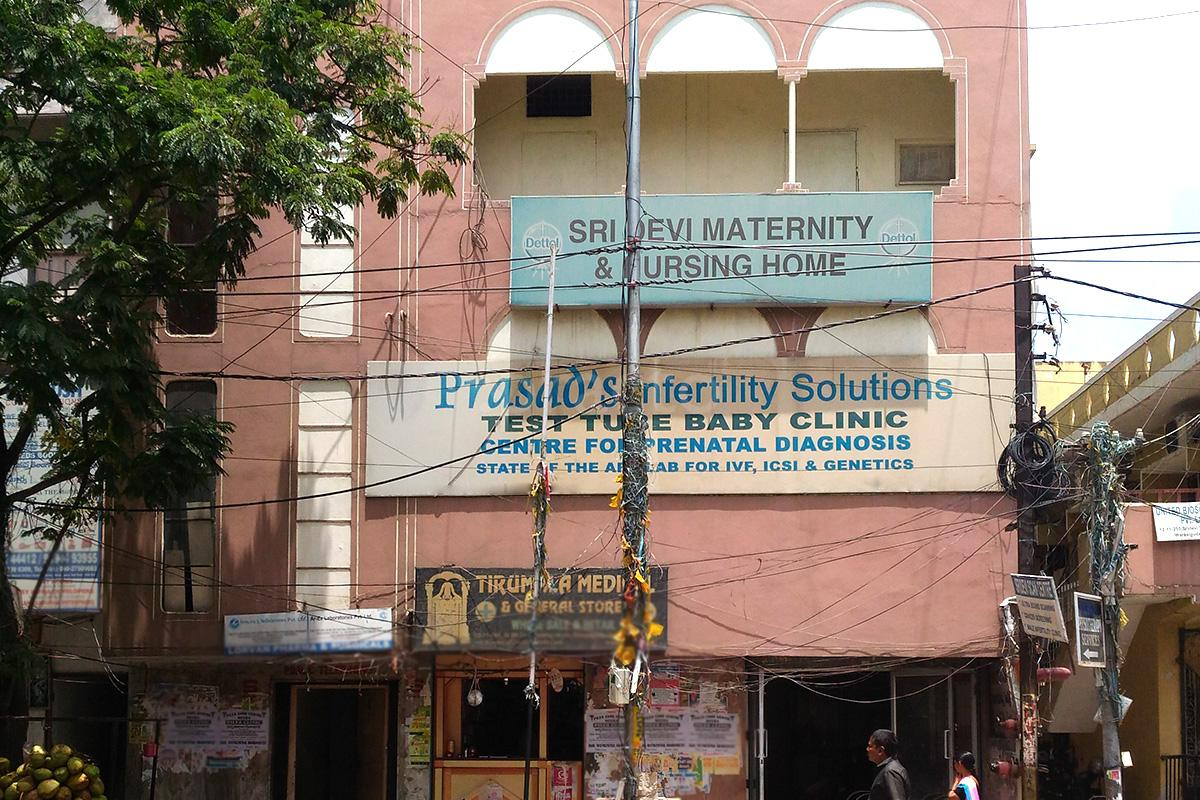
  Sridevi Nursing Home (now defunct)
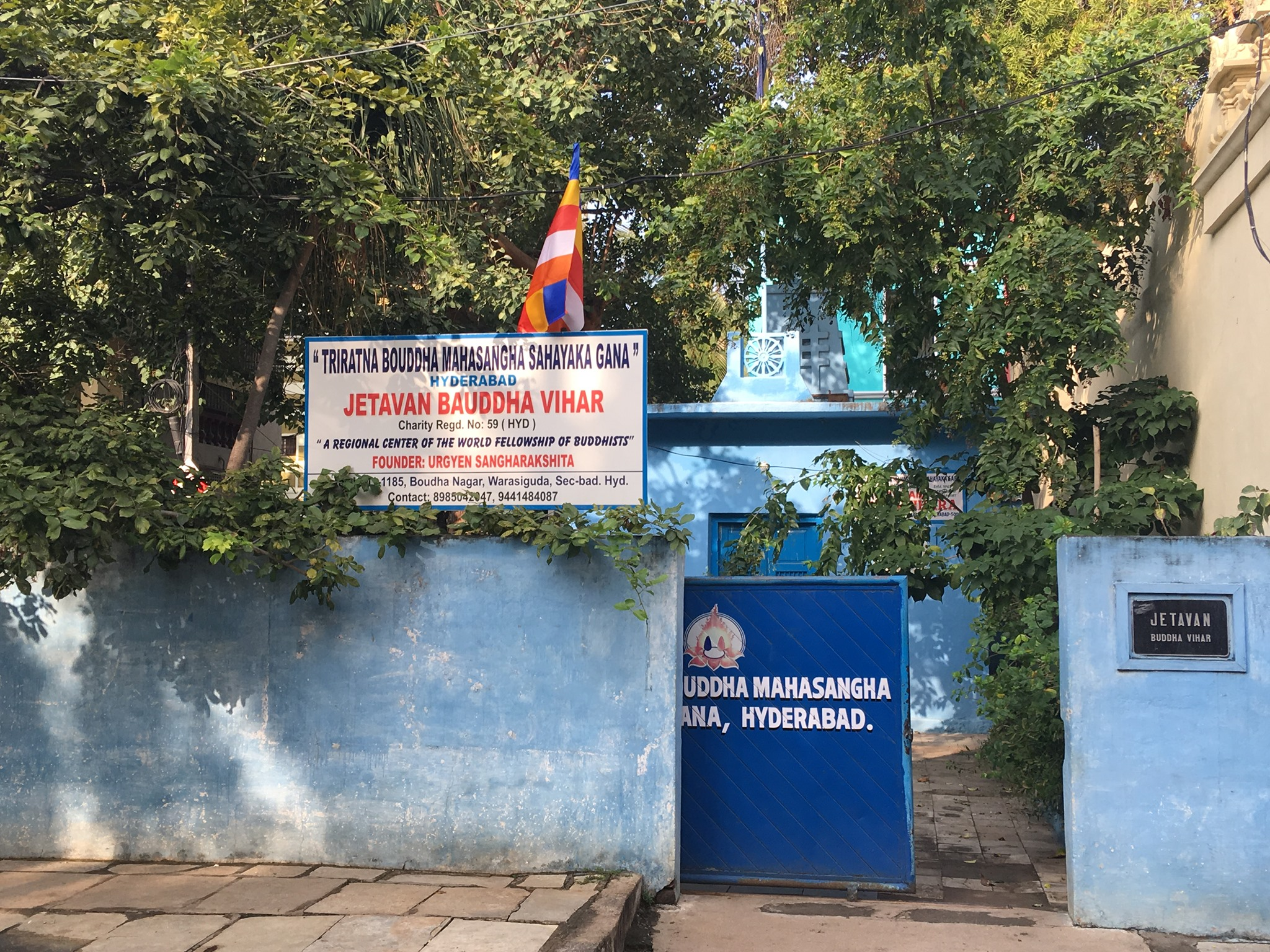
  Jetavana Buddha Vihar
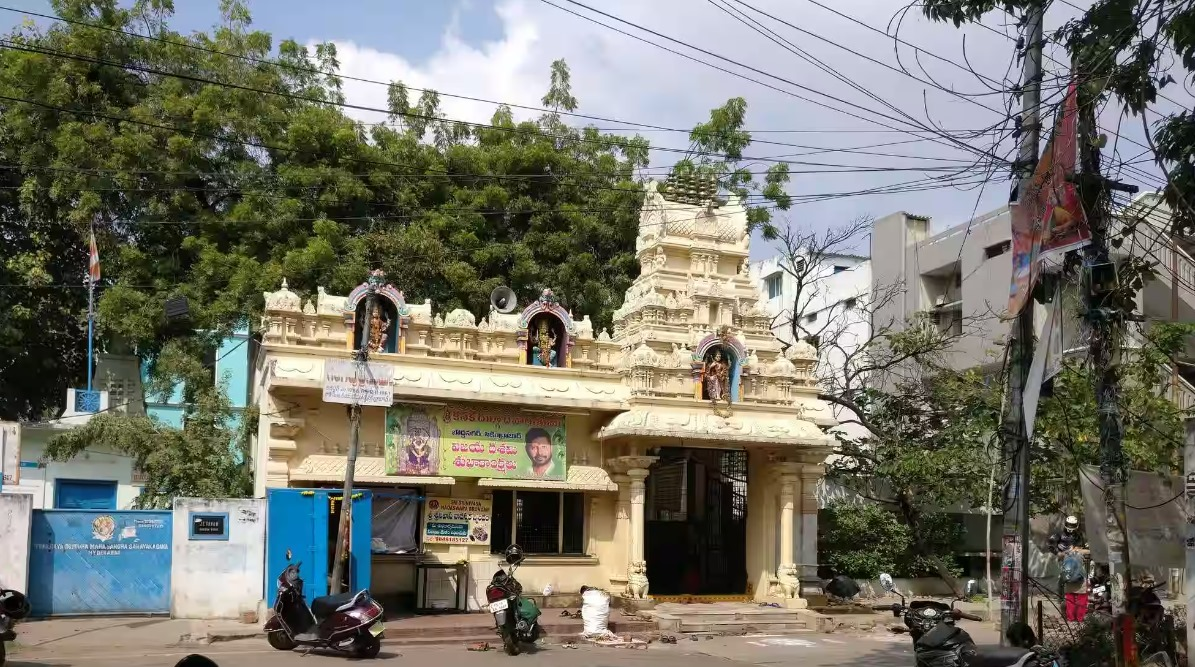
  Sri Kanaka Durga Devi Temple in Warasiguda
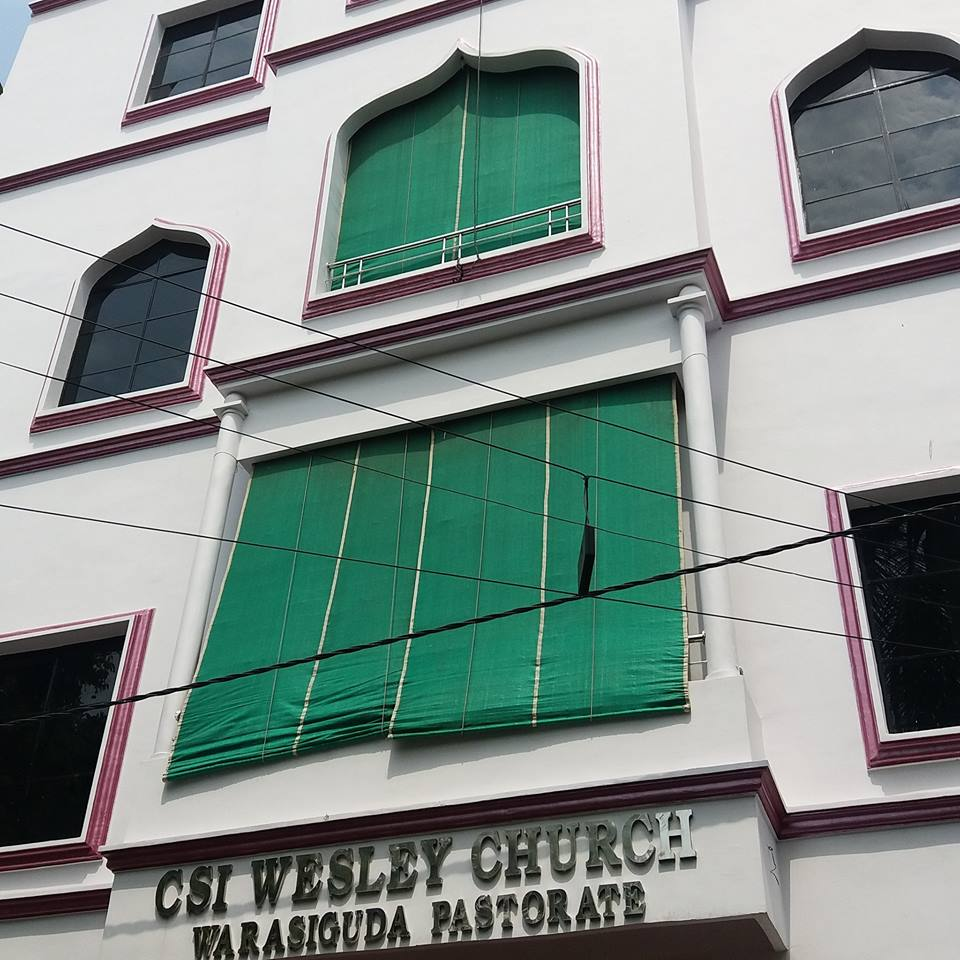
  CSI Wesley Church in Waraiguda

== Population ==
Warasiguda features a mix of commercial and residential spaces. The neighborhood has several markets and shopping areas where residents can purchase everyday goods and services. The Warasiguda Market is a popular spot for fresh produce, groceries, and household items. Additionally, there are retail shops, pharmacies, and small businesses that serve the local community.

Residential areas in Warasiguda consist of a combination of individual houses, apartment complexes, and gated communities. These residential zones offer a range of housing options to suit different budgets and preferences. The presence of schools, healthcare facilities, and public transport connections makes Warasiguda a desirable location for families and professionals.
