= K. Laxman =

Indian politician

Kova Laxman
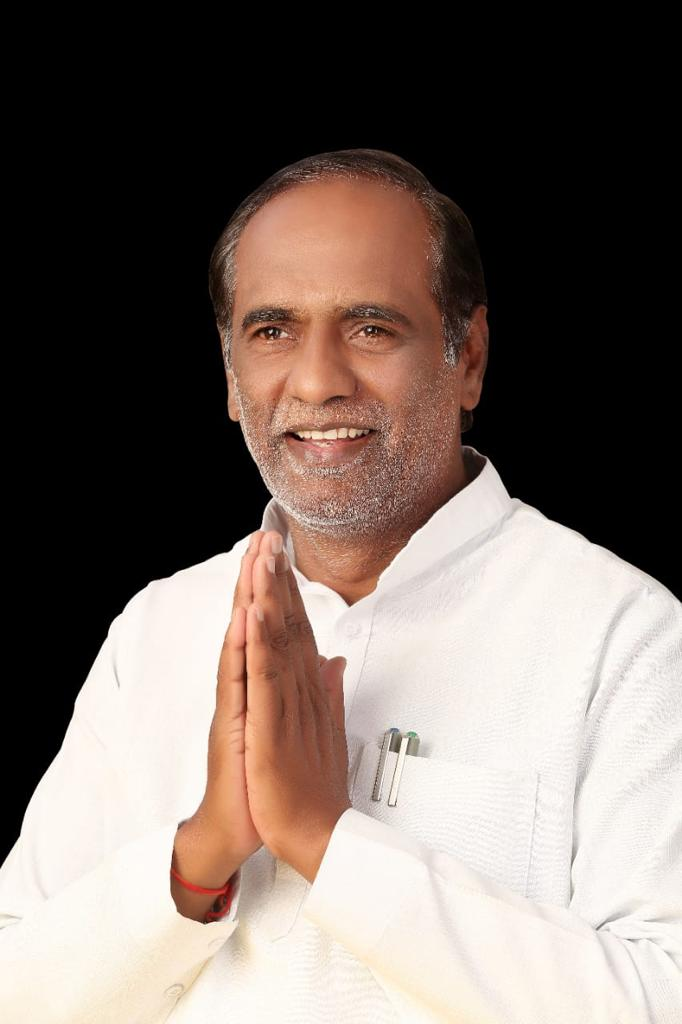

Member of Parliament, Rajya Sabha
- Incumbent
- Assumed office 5 July 2022
- Constituency: Uttar Pradesh

National President BJP OBC Morcha
- Incumbent
- Assumed office 26 September 2020
- President: Jagat Prakash Nadda; Nitin Nabin
- Preceded by: Dara Singh Chauhan

2nd President of the Bharatiya Janata Party, Telangana
- In office 8 April 2016 – 11 March 2020
- National President: Amit Shah
- Preceded by: G. Kishan Reddy
- Succeeded by: Bandi Sanjay Kumar

Member of Legislative Assembly, Telangana
- In office 2 June 2014 – 11 December 2018
- Preceded by: T. Manemma
- Succeeded by: Muta Gopal
- Constituency: Musheerabad

Member of Legislative Assembly Andhra Pradesh
- In office 10 October 1999 – 6 February 2004
- Preceded by: M. Kodanda Reddy
- Succeeded by: Nayani Narasimha Reddy
- Constituency: Musheerabad

Personal details
- Born: 3 July 1960 (age 66) Hyderabad, Andhra Pradesh, India
- Party: BJP
- Website: drklaxman.in

Kova Laxman is an Indian politician from the state of Telangana who currently the National President for Bharatiya Janata Party's OBC Morcha since 26 September 2020. He is a former State President of Bharatiya Janata Party in Telangana from 2016 to 2020. He represented Musheerabad Assembly constituency twice as MLA from 1999-2004 in Andhra Pradesh Assembly and from 2014-2018 in Telangana Legislative Assembly.

== Political career ==
He was elected as MLA for the second time from Musheerabad Assembly constituency in 2014 Telangana Assembly election.

He served as the floor leader of the Bharatiya Janata Party from 2014 to 2016 and then was made the second state president of Telangana BJP from 2016 to 2020.

He was appointed the President of the National OBC Morcha, on 26 September 2020.

K. Laxman was appointed as returning officer for BJP’s internal polls on 14 October 2024.

== Early political career ==
- From 1978 to 1980 he was elected as President, P.G. Science College, Osmania University Students Union on ABVP panel.
- In 1980, he joined Bharatiya Janata Party with the background of RSS & Student Leader (ABVP) in Osmania University.
- From 1984 to 1988, he was the General Secretary of Bharatiya Janata Party, Musheerabad Assembly, Andhra Pradesh.
- From 1988 to 1994, he was the General Secretary of Bharatiya Janata Party, Hyderabad City, Andhra Pradesh.
- From 1994 to 1999, he was the President of Bharatiya Janata Party, Hyderabad City, Andhra Pradesh.
- In the year 1999, he contested from Musheerabad Assembly Constituency and won as an MLA by highest majority of 18,562 votes over Congress Stalwart.
- From 1999 to 2002, he was made the Deputy Floor Leader of the Bharatiya Janata Party, Andhra Pradesh.
- From 2002 to 2010, he was the State General Secretary & Official Spokesperson of the Bharatiya Janata Party, Andhra Pradesh.
- From 2010 to 2013, he was the National Secretary of Bharatiya Janata Party & In-charge for Pondicherry State.
- From 2013 to 2014, he was a Member in Narendra Modi's team for Sardar Vallabhai Patel, Statue of Unity - “World’s highest Statue” & In-charge for Southern States and toured all the southern states.
- In the year 2014, he won as an MLA from Musheerabad Assembly with highest ever majority of 27,750 votes over TRS candidate.
- From 2014 to 2016, he was elected as the Floor Leader of Bharatiya Janatha Party in the Telangana Assembly.
- From 2016 to 2020, he was the State President of the Bharatiya Janata Party in Telangana State.

== Controversy ==
Laxman sparked a controversy over Sania Mirza being made the brand ambassador of Telangana by calling her Pakistan’s "daughter-in-law" after her marriage to cricketer Shoaib Malik and unfit to be a representative of an Indian state. This sparked outrage and drew a fierce response from Sania who said she will remain an Indian until the "end of her life".

== Personal life and education ==
Laxman is married to Uma and the couple have three children: Swetha, Rahul and Shruthi.

K. Laxman has done his MSc. and Ph.D. from Osmania University completing his research on the subject Geology. He has received a Gold Medal for his research.

== Electoral history ==
Year	Constituency	Party	Votes	%	Opponent	Party	Votes	%	Result	Margin	%
1994	Musheerabad	BJP	24,294	26.56	M. Kodanda Reddy	INC	32,859	35.92	Lost	-8,565	-9.36
1999	Musheerabad	BJP	71,413	55.30	M. Kodanda Reddy	INC	52,846	40.92	Won	+18,567	+14.38
2004	Musheerabad	BJP	53,313	46.24	Nayini Narsimha Reddy	TRS	53,553	46.45	Lost	-240	-0.21
2008 (Note: By-election)	Musheerabad	BJP	32,720	29.36	T. Manemma	INC	34,795	31.22	Lost	-2,075	-1.86
2009	Musheerabad	BJP	31,123	23.44	T. Manemma	INC	45,966	34.62	Lost	-14,843	-11.18
2014	Musheerabad	BJP	65,209	43.22	Muta Gopal	TRS	37,823	25.07	Won	+27,386	+18.15
2018	Musheerabad	BJP	30,813	21.28	Muta Gopal	TRS	72,997	50.42	Lost	-42,184	-29.14
