= Musheerabad Assembly constituency =

Constituency of the Telangana legislative assembly in India

Coordinates: 17.417°N 78.501°E

Musheerabad
- Constituency No. 57 for the Telangana Legislative Assembly
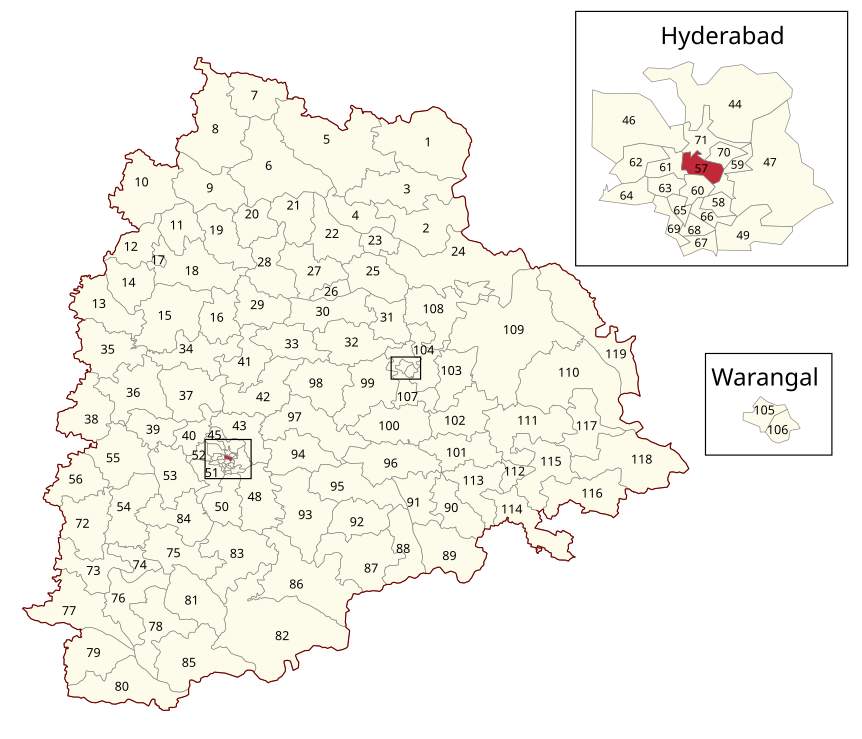
- Location of Musheerabad Assembly constituency within Telangana

Constituency details
- Country: India
- Region: South India
- State: Telangana
- District: Hyderabad
- Lok Sabha constituency: Secunderabad
- Established: 1951
- Total electors: 2,75,016
- Reservation: None

Member of Legislative Assembly
- 3rd Telangana Legislative Assembly
- Incumbent Muta Gopal
- Party: BRS
- Elected year: 2023

Musheerabad Assembly constituency is a constituency of Telangana Legislative Assembly, India. It is one of the fifteen constituencies in the capital city of Hyderabad. It is part of Secunderabad Lok Sabha constituency.

Dr. K. Laxman, president of Bharatiya Janata Party unit of Telangana has represented the constituency twice. Muta Gopal won the 2023 election.

== Extent of the constituency ==
The Assembly Constituency presently comprises the following neighbourhoods:

Neighbourhood
Musheerabad
Chikkadpally
Ashok Nagar
Domalguda
Ramnagar
Kavadiguda
Azamabad
Parsigutta
Adikmet
Nallakunta (part)
Bagh Lingampally (part)
Vidyanagar (part)
Bholakpur (part)

== Members of Legislative Assembly ==
Members of Legislative State Assembly, who represented Musheerabad.

Year	Member	Party
Hyderabad State
1952	G. S. Melkote	Indian National Congress
Andhra Pradesh
1957	K. Seethiah Gupta	Indian National Congress
1962	Tanguturi Anjaiah	Indian National Congress
1967	Tanguturi Anjaiah	Indian National Congress
1972	Tanguturi Anjaiah	Indian National Congress
1978	Nayani Narasimha Reddy	Janata Party
1983	Sripathi Rajeshwar Rao	Telugu Desam Party
1985	Nayani Narasimha Reddy	Janata Party
1989	M. Kodanda Reddy	Indian National Congress
1994	M. Kodanda Reddy	Indian National Congress
1999	K. Laxman	Bharatiya Janata Party
2004	Nayani Narasimha Reddy	Telangana Rashtra Samithi
2008^	T. Manemma	Indian National Congress
2009	T. Manemma	Indian National Congress
Telangana
2014	K. Laxman	Bharatiya Janata Party
2018	Muta Gopal	Telangana Rashtra Samithi
2023	Muta Gopal	Bharat Rashtra Samithi

== Election results ==
=== 2023 ===
2023 Telangana Legislative Assembly election: Musheerabad
Party	Candidate	Votes	%	±%
BRS	Muta Gopal	75,207		
INC	M. Anjan Kumar Yadav	37,410		
BJP	Poosa Raju	35,423		
NOTA	None of the Above			
Majority		37,797		
Turnout				
BRS hold		Swing		

=== 2018 ===
2018 Telangana Legislative Assembly election: Musheerabad
Party	Candidate	Votes	%	±%
TRS	Muta Gopal	72,997	50.42%	
INC	Anil Kumar Yadav	36,087	24.93%	
BJP	Dr. K. Laxman	30,813	21.28%	
NOTA	None of the Above	1,664	1.15%	
Majority		36,910	25.8%	
Turnout		1,44,770	52.82%	
TRS gain from BJP		Swing		

=== Telangana Legislative Assembly election, 2014 ===
Telangana Assembly Elections, 2014: Musheerabad (Assembly constituency)
Party	Candidate	Votes	%	±%
BJP	Dr. K. Laxman	65,209	43.5%	
TRS	M. Gopal	37,823	25.3%	
INC	P. Vinay Kumar	26,808	17.9%	
Majority		27,386	-	
Turnout		1,50,884	54.9%	
BJP gain from INC		Swing		

=== Andhra Pradesh Legislative Assembly election, 2009 ===
Andhra Pradesh Assembly Elections, 2009: Musheerabad (Assembly constituency)
Party	Candidate	Votes	%	±%
INC	T. Manemma	45,966	34.62%	
BJP	Dr. K. Laxman	31,123	23.44%	
TRS	Nayini Narsimha Reddy	21,967	16.55%	
PRP	P.V. Ashok Kumar	16,300	12.28%	

== Trivia ==
- T. Anjaiah, former Chief Minister of Andhra Pradesh represented the constituency three times in 1962, 1967 and 1972.
- N. Narsimha Reddy, the first Home Minister of Telangana, represented the constituency for two terms as a Janata Party candidate and one time as a TRS candidate.

== See also ==
- Musheerabad
- List of constituencies of Telangana Legislative Assembly
