= Musheerabad =

- Suburbs
- Location in Hyderabad, India Musheerabad (India)
- Coordinates: 17.425544°N 78.503795°E
- Country: India
- State: Telangana
- District: Hyderabad
- Metro: Hyderabad
- Named for: Nawab Arastu Jah, Mushir-Ul-Mulk

Government
  - Body: Greater Hyderabad Municipal Corporation

Languages
  - Official: Telugu, Urdu
- Time zone: UTC+5:30 (IST)
- PIN: 500020
- Vehicle registration: TG
- Lok Sabha constituency: Secunderabad
- Vidhan Sabha constituency: Musheerabad
- Planning agency: Greater Hyderabad Municipal Corporation
- Website: telangana.gov.in

Musheerabad is a commercial centre in Hyderabad, India. Musheerabad comes under central zone and ninth circle of Hyderabad, and falls under the Secunderabad revenue division.

== History ==
The historic old portion of Musheerabad Masjid was constructed during the Qutb Shahi era. Later the mosque and surrounding area were given as a jagir to Nawab Aratu Jah, Mushir-ul-Mulk (then Prime Minister of Hyderabad) and named in his honour.

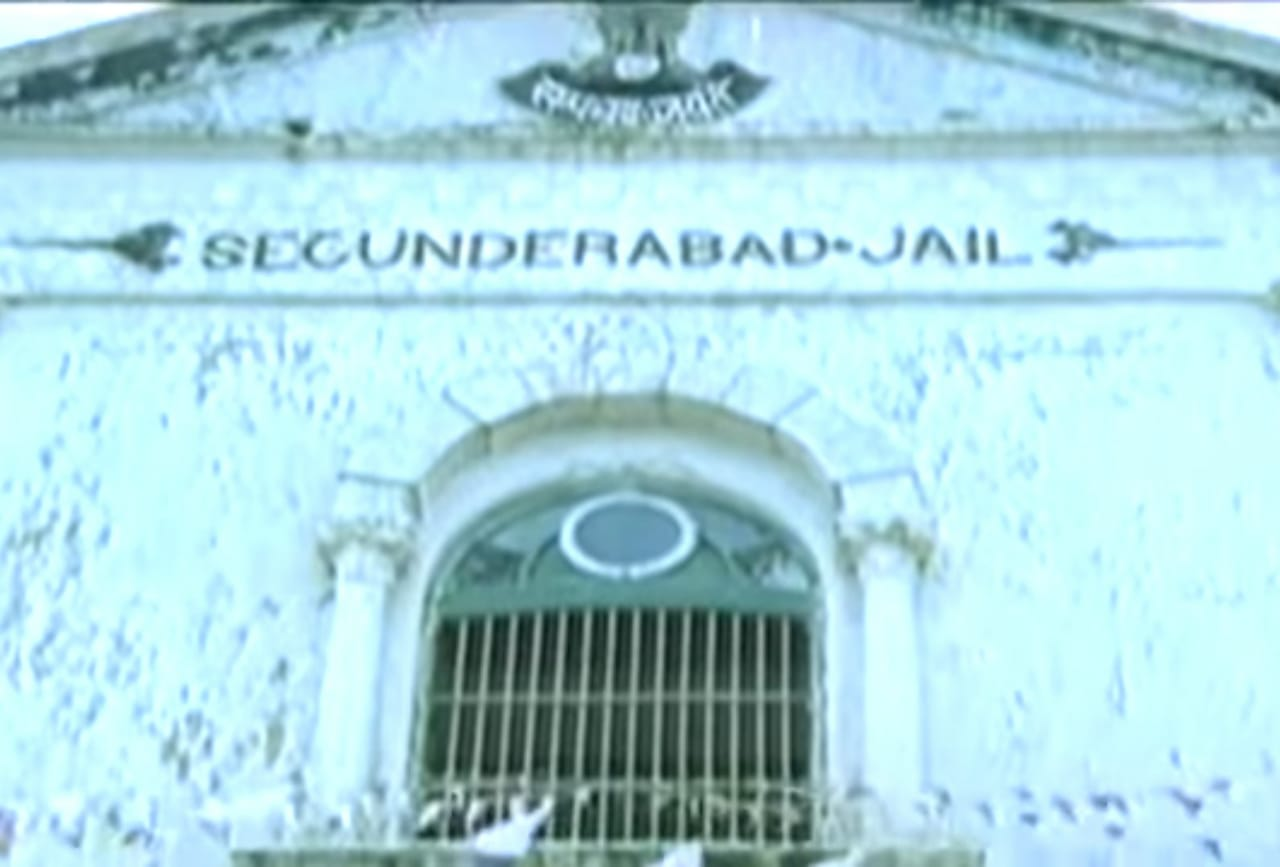
Old Secunderabad Jail, also known as Musheerabad Jail which was constructed in the 1915 and demolished in 2003.

The area housed the Musheerabad Jail until 2003 after which it was demolished and a new hospital and the new premises of Gandhi Medical College were constructed in the same area. Most of the recent development of Musheerabad has occurred following the construction of the Gandhi Medical College and the adjoining Gandhi Hospital, one of the largest public hospitals in Telangana. Several postgraduate medical entrance coaching centres, restaurants and apartments have sprung up in the area, owing to the large number of medical students residing in Musheerabad. The presence of the hospital has also led to several diagnostic labs and pharmacies opening their branches in Musheerabad. A separate station for Gandhi Medical College has also been planned on the Hyderabad Metro rail network.

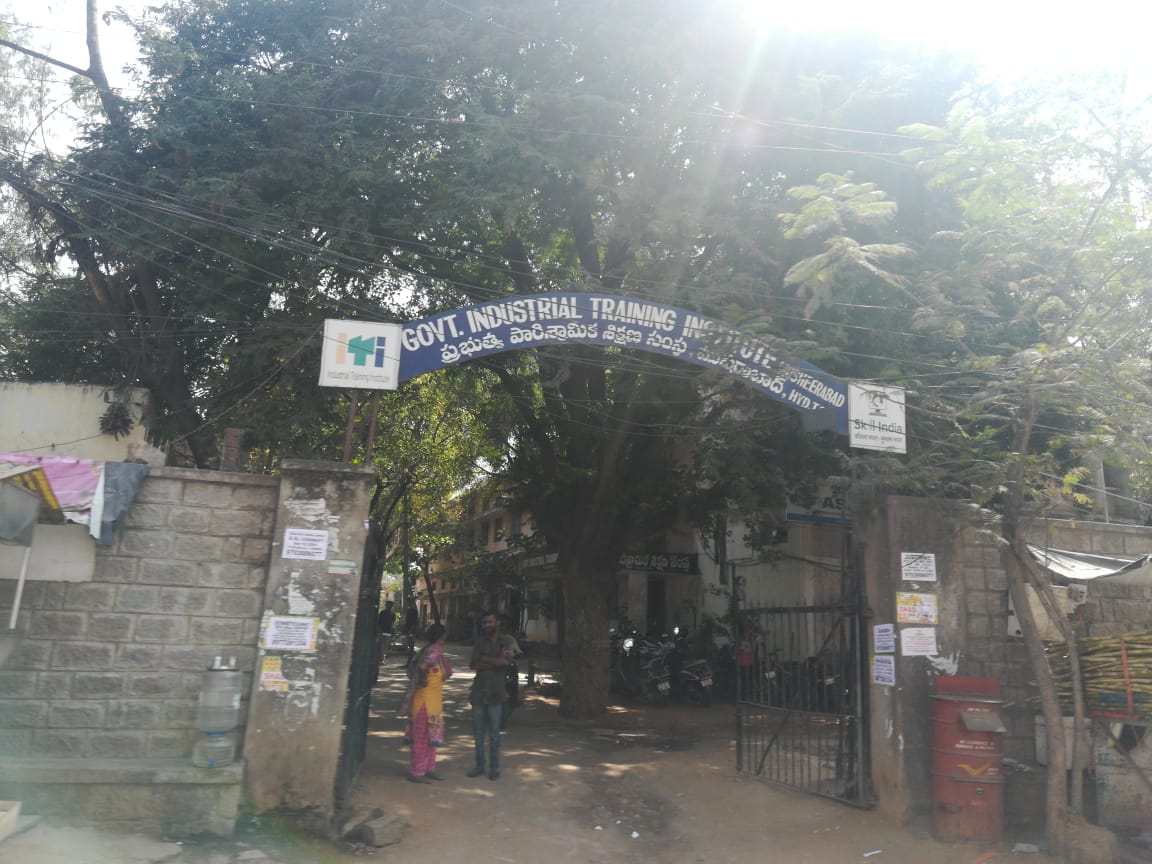
Government Industrial Training Institute at Musheerabad

== Politics ==
Musheerabad (Assembly constituency) is one of the electoral constituencies in the Telangana Legislative Assembly. Member of legislative Assembly (MLA) since 2018 is Muta Gopal (TRS).

== Economy ==
The area is commercial in nature with the presence mainly of traders of silk sarees and tanneries.

Musheerabad is a buzz place on Sundays, with roadside old book vendors.

== Transport ==
Musheerabad is well-connected to other parts of the city through public transit. Telangana State Road Transport Corporation runs several buses. Intercity and intracity trains are available from Secunderabad Railway Station, Vidyanagar Railway Station and Jamia Osmania Railway Station – each of which is equidistant from this area. Musheerabad metro station of the Hyderabad Metro rail network.

== Neighbourhoods ==
Chikkadpally, Ramnagar, Kavadiguda, Domalguda, Ashoknagar, Bagh Lingampally, Gandhinagar, Parsigutta and Padmarao Nagar are some of the localities surrounding Musheerabad.

Bholakpur, also known as Bholakpura, is an old neighbourhood located in the Musheerabad area of Hyderabad, Telangana. It has its own local identity and historical significance within the northern part of Hyderabad.

== Notable people ==
- Bahadur Yar Jung, one of the founding members of All India Majlis-e-Ittehadul Muslimeen, is buried in Musheerabad.
