= M. Kodanda Reddy =

Indian politician

Mudireddy Kodanda Reddy
- M. Kodanda Reddy at Bathukamma young Film Makers Challenge 2026

Telangana Agriculture and Farmers Welfare Commission Chairman
- In office 6 September 2024 – Incumbent

Member of Legislative Assembly
- In office 1989–1999
- Preceded by: Nayani Narasimha Reddy
- Succeeded by: K. Laxman
- Constituency: Musheerabad

Personal details
- Born: Hyderabad
- Party: Indian National Congress
- Profession: Politician

Mudireddy Kodanda Reddy is an Indian politician and was a Member of the Legislative Assembly during the 9th and 10th assemblies of Andhra Pradesh.

He was appointed as Dharani committee member constituted by government on 10 January 2024 and later appointed as chairman for Telangana State Agriculture and Farmers Welfare Commission on 6 September 2024.
