= Ashok Nagar, Hyderabad =

Ashok Nagar
- Neighbourhood
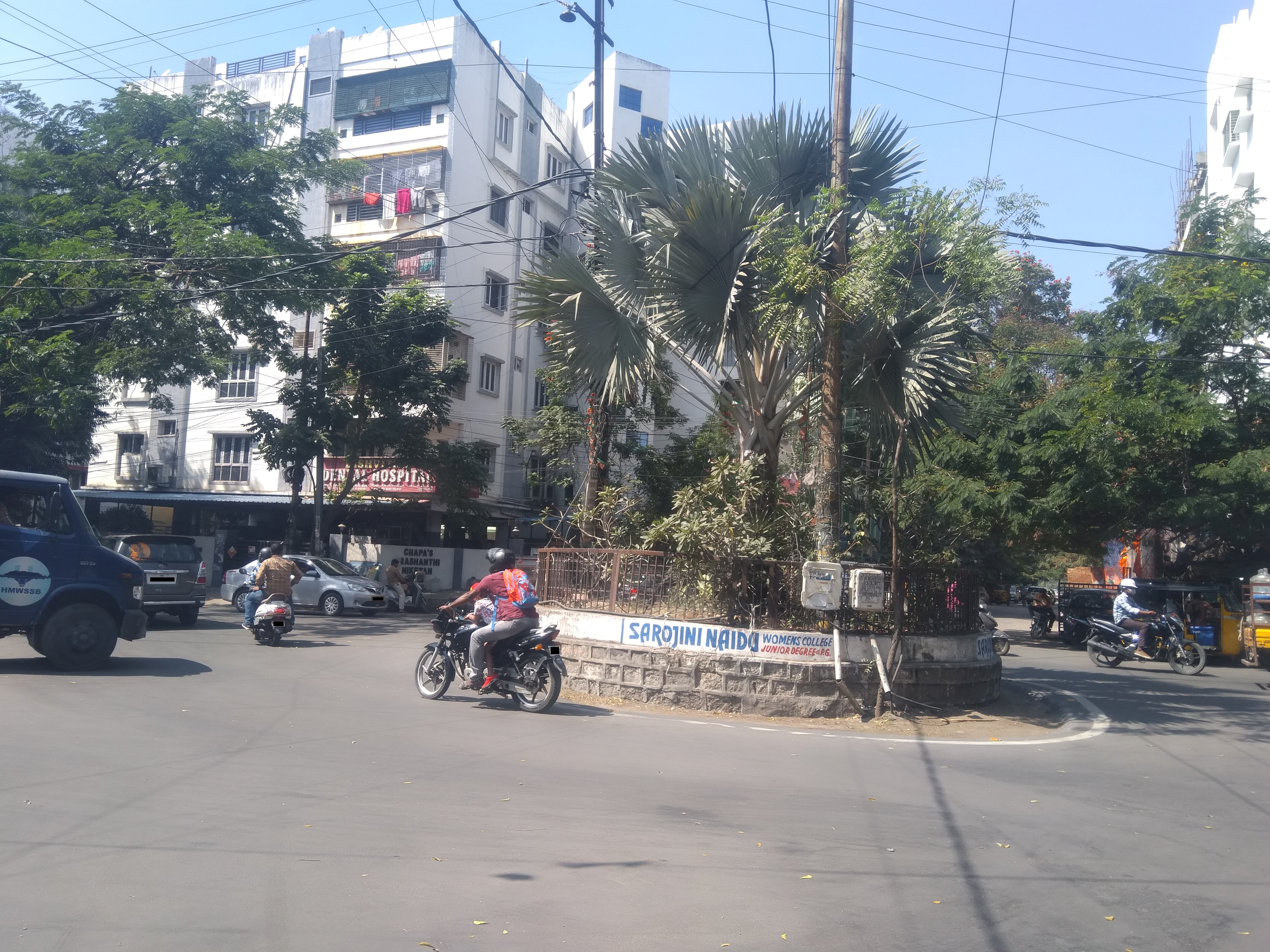
- Ashok Nagar Circle at Ashok Nagar

- Location in Hyderabad, Telangana, India Ashok Nagar (Telangana) Ashok Nagar (India)
- Coordinates: 17.407036°N 78.488691°E
- Country: India
- State: Telangana
- District: Hyderabad
- Metro: Hyderabad

Government
  - Body: GHMC

Languages
  - Official: Telugu
- Time zone: UTC+5:30 (IST)
- PIN: 500020
- Vehicle registration: TG
- Lok Sabha constituency: Secunderabad
- Vidhan Sabha constituency: Musheerabad
- Planning agency: GHMC

Ashok Nagar is a locality in Hyderabad, Telangana, India. The locality is well known for its concentration of coaching centres catering to students aspiring for Government jobs.

== Commercial area ==
There are many shopping malls catering to all needs. It is close to Hussain sagar lake and the popular Indira Park. The suburb is well known for coaching institutes. Around 25,000–30,000 students get trained every year for UPSC, APPSC, TSPSC, SSC and other well known government exams. After Karol Bagh and Mukherjee Nagar (of Delhi), Ashok nagar of Hyderabad is the most preferred destination for UPSC Civil Services coaching.

== Transport ==
Ashok Nagar is well-connected by the TSRTC buses which ply on two routes covering most of the area. The closest MMTS train station is Vidyanagar station.
