= 2009 Indian general election in Andhra Pradesh =

- April–May 2009

42 seats
- Turnout: 72.70%
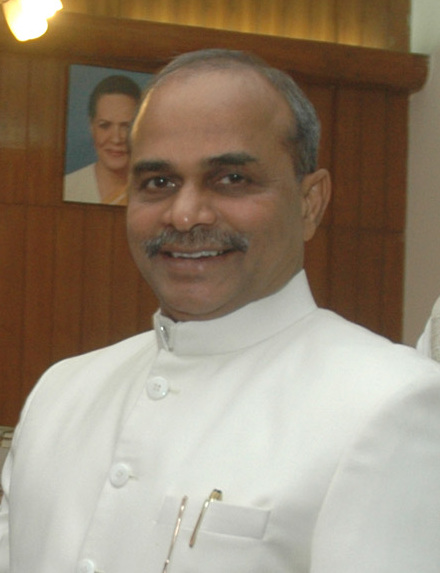

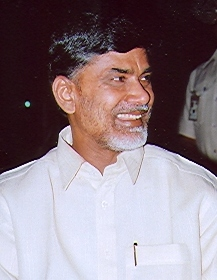

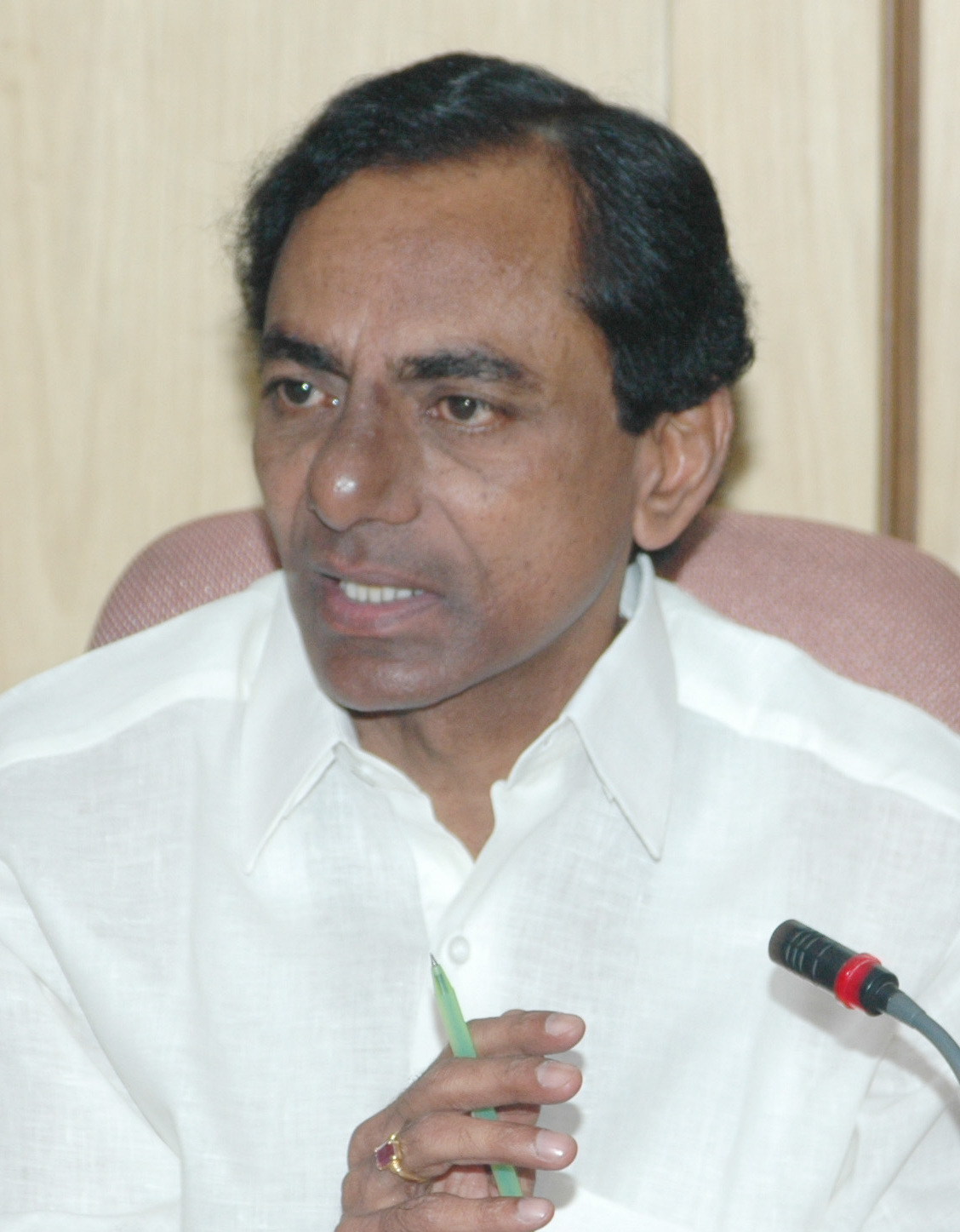

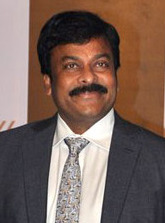
	First party	Second party
Leader	Y. S. Rajasekhara Reddy	N. Chandrababu Naidu
Party	INC	Telugu Desam Party
Alliance	UPA	Maha Kutami
Leader's seat	None	None
Last election	29	5
Seats won	33	6
Seat change	▲4	▲1
Percentage	39.68%	24.93%
Swing	▼8.72%	▼16.57%
	Third party	Fourth party
Leader	K. Chandrasekhar Rao	Chiranjeevi
Party	TRS	PRP
Alliance	Maha Kutami	None
Leader since	2001	2008
Leader's seat	Mahbubnagar	Hyderabad
Last election	5	New party
Seats won	2	0
Seat change	▼3
Percentage	6.14%	6.10%
Swing	▼0.69%	▲6.10%
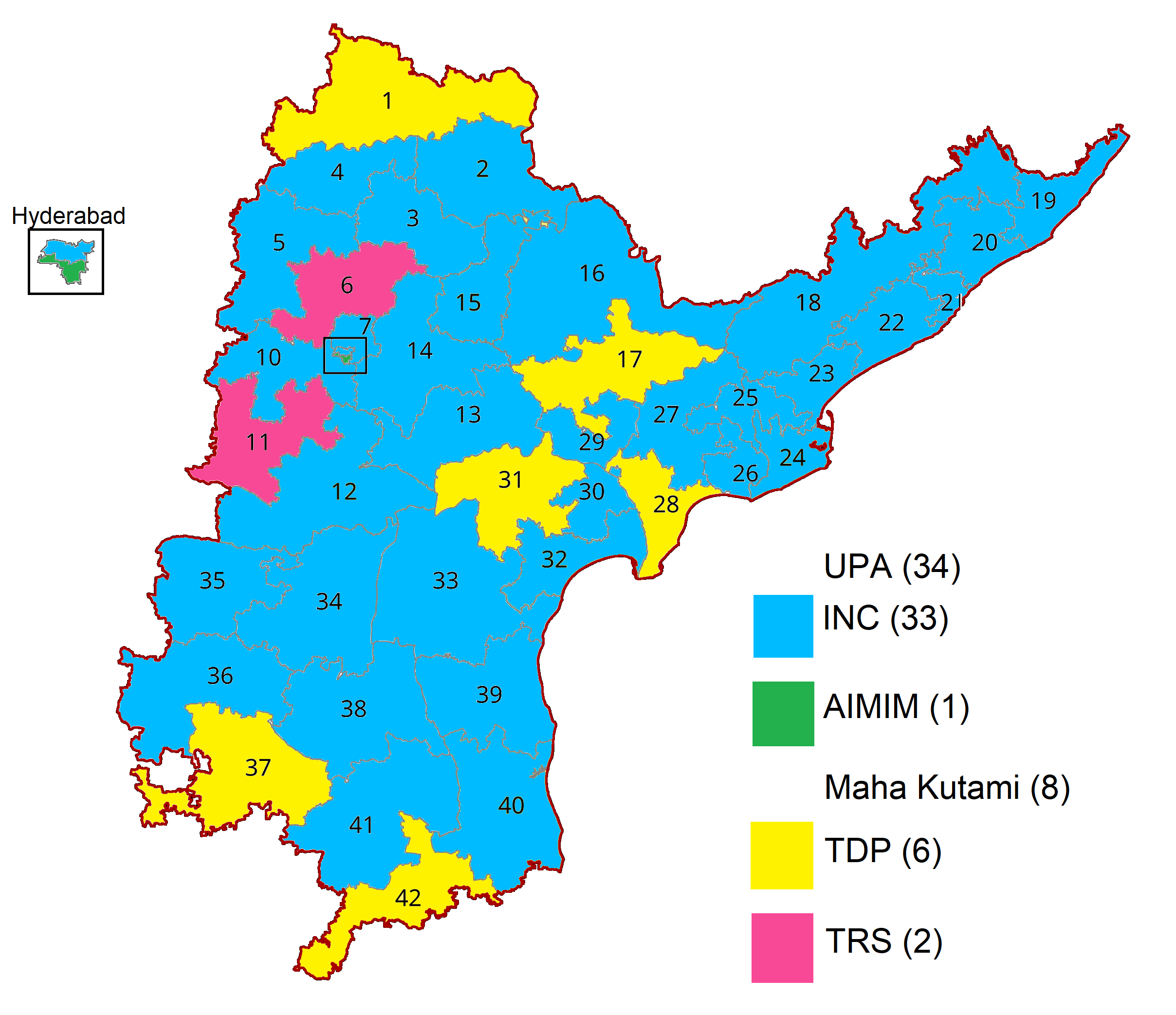
- Seatwise Result Map of the 2024 general election in Andhra Pradesh
Prime Minister before election
Manmohan Singh
INC
Prime Minister after election
Manmohan Singh
INC

The 2009 Indian general election polls in Andhra Pradesh were held for 42 seats in the state. The major contenders in the polls were the Third Front, Indian National Congress and Praja Rajyam. The assembly elections were held simultaneously with the general elections in the state.

Telugu Desam Party (TDP) left the National Democratic Alliance (NDA) after the losses in 2004, and now joined the Third Front. Telangana Rashtra Samithi who were part of the UPA, in the 2004 election, also now allied with the Third Front. But after voting took place in Andhra Pradesh, and before votes were counted, the TRS joined the NDA. These were the first elections for the movie star Chiranjeevi led Praja Rajyam.

The results were a repeat of the last election, where the Indian National Congress and the UPA, won 34 out of 42 seats, resulting in a landslide victory. The popularity of Chief Minister Rajasekhar Reddy earned him a landslide victory in the national election and winning his re-election, in the state election.

== Parties and alliances ==
=== United Progressive Alliance ===
United Progressive Alliance

Party	Flag	Symbol	Leader	Seats contested
Indian National Congress			Y. S. Rajasekhara Reddy	42

=== Maha Kutami ===
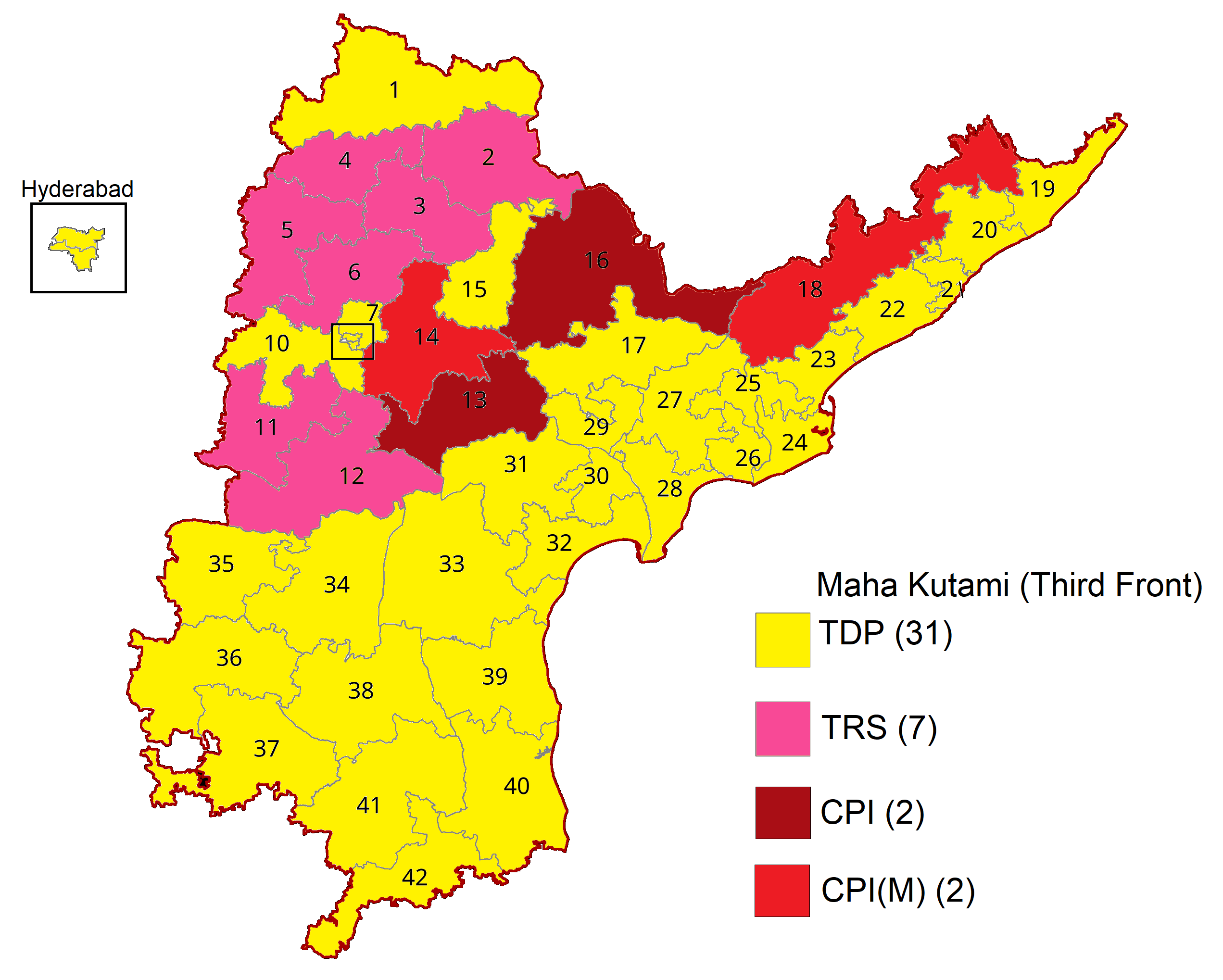

Party	Flag	Symbol	Leader	Seats contested
Telugu Desam Party			N. Chandrababu Naidu	29+2 (Note: Friendly contest between TDP and TRS in Secunderabad (PC–8) and Warangal (PC–15))
Telangana Rashtra Samithi			K. Chandrashekhar Rao	7+2
Communist Party of India			D. Raja	2
Communist Party of India (Marxist)			Sitaram Yechury	2
Total				40+2

== List of Candidates ==
Constituency		INC		Maha Kutami		PRP	
#	Name	Party	Candidate	Party	Candidate	Party	Candidate
1	Adilabad	INC	Kotnak Ramesh	TDP	Ramesh Rathod	PRP	Mesram Nago Rao
2	Peddapalle	INC	Gaddam Vivekanand	TRS	Gomasa Srinivas	PRP	Arepelli David Raju
3	Karimnagar	INC	Ponnam Prabhakar	TRS	Boianapalli Vinod Kumar	PRP	Velichala Rajender Rao
4	Nizamabad	INC	Madhu Yaskhi Goud	TRS	Bigala Ganesh Gupta	PRP	P. Vinay Kumar
5	Zahirabad	INC	Suresh Kumar Shetkar	TRS	Syed Yousuf Ali	PRP	Malkapuram Shiva Kumar
6	Medak	INC	Narendra Nath Chengala	TRS	Vijaya Shanthi	PRP	Khaja Quayum Anwar
7	Malkajgiri	INC	Sarvey Sathyanarayana	TDP	T. Bheemsen	PRP	Tulla Devender Goud
8	Secunderabad	INC	M. Anjan Kumar Yadav	TDP	S. Sudhish Rambhotla	PRP	Dasoju Sravan Kumar
8	Secunderabad	INC	M. Anjan Kumar Yadav	TRS	M. D. Mahmood Ali	PRP	Dasoju Sravan Kumar
9	Hyderabad	INC	P. Laxman Rao Goud	TDP	Zahid Ali Khan	PRP	A. Fatima
10	Chevella	INC	Jaipal Reddy	TDP	A. P. Jithender Reddy		
11	Mahabubnagar	INC	Devarakonda Vittal Rao	TRS	K. Chandrashekar Rao		
12	Nagarkurnool	INC	Manda Jagannath	TRS	Guvvala Balaraju	PRP	Devani Satyanarayana
13	Nalgonda	INC	Gutha Sukender Reddy	CPI	Suravaram Sudhakar Reddy	PRP	Paduri Karuna
14	Bhongir	INC	Komatireddy	CPI(M)	Nomula Narsimhaiah Yadav	PRP	Chandra Mouli
15	Warangal	INC	Siricilla Rajaiah	TRS	Ramagalla Parameshwar	PRP	Chandragiri Rajamouly
15	Warangal	INC	Siricilla Rajaiah	TDP	Dommati Sambaiah	PRP	Chandragiri Rajamouly
16	Mahabubabad	INC	Balram Naik	CPI	Kunja Srinivasa Rao	PRP	D.T. Naik
17	Khammam	INC	Renuka Chowdary	TDP	Nama Nageswara Rao	PRP	Jalagam Hemamalini
18	Araku	INC	Kishore Chandra Deo	CPI(M)	Babu Rao Mediyam	PRP	Meenaka Simhachalam
19	Srikakulam	INC	Killi Krupa Rani	TDP	Yerrannaidu Kinjarapu	PRP	Kalyani Varudu
20	Vizianagaram	INC	Botcha Jhansi Lakshmi	TDP	Kondapalli Appala Naidu	PRP	Kimidi Ganapathi Rao
21	Visakhapatnam	INC	Daggubati Purandeswari	TDP	M. V. V. S. Murthi	PRP	Palla Srinivasa Rao
22	Anakapalli	INC	Sabbam Hari	TDP	N. Surya Prakasa Rao	PRP	Allu Aravind
23	Kakinada	INC	M. M. Pallam Raju	TDP	Vasamsetty Satya	PRP	Chalamalasetty Sunil
24	Amalapuram	INC	G. V. Harsha Kumar	TDP	Gedela Varalakshmi	PRP	Pothula Prameela Devi
25	Rajahmundry	INC	Vundavalli Aruna Kumar	TDP	Murali Mohan	PRP	Krishnam Raju
26	Narasapuram	INC	Kanumuri Bapiraju	TDP	Thota Sita Rama Lakshmi	PRP	Gubbala Tammaiah
27	Eluru	INC	Kavuri Samba Siva Rao	TDP	Maganti Venkateswara Rao	PRP	K. P. Reddaiah Yadav
28	Machilipatnam	INC	Badiga Ramakrishna	TDP	Konakalla Narayana Rao	PRP	C. Ramachandraiah
29	Vijayawada	INC	Rajagopal Lagadapati	TDP	Vamsi Mohan Vallabhaneni	PRP	Rajiv Chanumolu
30	Guntur	INC	Rayapati Sambasiva Rao	TDP	Rajendra Madala	PRP	Thota Chandra Sekhar
31	Narasaraopet	INC	Balashowry Vallabhaneni	TDP	Modugula V. Reddy	PRP	Shaik Syed Saheb
32	Bapatla	INC	Panabaka Lakshmi	TDP	Malyadri Sriram	PRP	Nuthakki Rama Rao
33	Ongole	INC	Magunta S. Reddy	TDP	M. M. Yadav	PRP	Pidathala Sai Kalpana
34	Nandyal	INC	S. P. Y. Reddy	TDP	N. M. D. Farooq	PRP	Bhuma Nagi Reddy
35	Kurnool	INC	K. J. Prakasha Reddy	TDP	B. T. Naidu	PRP	Dr. Dandiya Khaja Peera
36	Anantapur	INC	Anantha V. Reddy	TDP	Kalava Srinivasulu	PRP	G. S. Mansoor
37	Hindupur	INC	P. Khasim Khan	TDP	Kristappa Nimmala	PRP	Kadapala Sreekanta Reddy
38	Kadapa	INC	Y. S. Jagan Mohan Reddy	TDP	Palem Srikanth Reddy	PRP	Dr. Khaleel Basha
39	Nellore	INC	Mekapati Rajamohan Reddy	TDP	Vanteru Venu Gopala Reddy	PRP	Jana Ramachandraiah
40	Tirupati	INC	Chinta Mohan	TDP	Varla Ramaiah	PRP	Varaprasad Rao Velagapalli
41	Rajampet	INC	Sai Prathap Annayyagari	TDP	Reddappagari Ramesh	PRP	D. A. Srinivas
42	Chittoor	INC	M. Thippeswamy	TDP	Naramalli Sivaprasad	PRP	Talari Manohar

== Voting and results ==
=== Results by Alliance ===
Alliance/ Party		Popular vote			Seats		
Alliance/ Party		Votes	%	±pp	Contested	Won	+/−
TDP+	TDP	1,04,81,659	24.93	▼8.19	29 + 2	6	▲1
TDP+	TRS	25,82,326	6.14	▼0.69	7 + 2	2	▼3
TDP+	CPI	6,66,357	1.58	▲0.24	2	0	▼1
TDP+	CPI(M)	5,32,229	1.26	▲0.22	2	0	▼1
TDP+	Total	1,42,62,571	33.91	Steady	40 + 4	8	Steady
INC		1,63,77,941	38.95	▼2.61	42	33	▲4
PRP		65,90,046	15.67	New	40	0	Steady
AIMIM		3,08,061	0.73	▼0.44	1	1	Steady
BJP		15,77,512	3.75	▼4.66	41	0	Steady
Others		15,45,628	3.67	▲1.28	177	0	Steady
IND		13,85,698	3.29	▼0.86	224	0	Steady
Total		4,20,47,457	100%	-	569	42	-

== List of elected members ==
Constituency		Winner				Runner Up				Margin	%
#	Name	Candidate	Party	Votes	%	Candidate	Party	Votes	%	Margin	%
1	Adilabad	Ramesh Rathod	TDP	372,268	43.11	Kotnak Ramesh	INC	257,181	29.78	115,087	13.33
2	Peddapalle	G. Vivekanand	INC	313,748	34.70	Srinivas Gomase	TRS	264,731	29.28	49,017	5.42
3	Karimnagar	Ponnam Prabhakar	INC	317,927	32.14	B. Vinod Kumar	TRS	267,684	27.06	50,243	5.08
4	Nizamabad	Madhu Goud Yaskhi	INC	296,504	33.33	Bigala Ganesh Gupta	TRS	236,114	26.54	60,390	6.79
5	Zahirabad	Shetkar Suresh Kumar	INC	395,767	38.90	Syed Yousuf Ali	TRS	378,360	37.19	17,407	1.71
6	Medak	Vijaya Shanthi	TRS	388,839	36.67	C. Narendranath	INC	382,762	36.10	6,077	0.57
7	Malkajgiri	Sarve Satyanarayana	INC	388,368	32.21	T. Bheemsen	TDP	295,042	24.47	93,326	7.74
8	Secundrabad	Anjan Kumar Yadav	INC	340,549	39.37	Bandaru Dattatreya	BJP	170,382	19.70	170,167	19.67
9	Hyderabad	Asaduddin Owaisi	AIMIM	308,061	42.14	Zahid Ali Khan	TDP	194,196	26.56	113,865	15.58
10	Chelvella	Jaipal Reddy	INC	420,807	38.78	A. P. Jithender Reddy	TDP	402,275	37.08	18,532	1.70
11	Mahbubnagar	K. Chandrasekhar Rao	TRS	366,569	39.56	Devarakonda Vittal Rao	INC	346,385	37.39	20,184	2.17
12	Nagarkurnool	Manda Jagannath	INC	422,745	41.23	Guvvala Balaraju	TRS	374,978	36.57	47,767	4.66
13	Nalgonda	Gutha Sukender Reddy	INC	493,849	45.78	Suravaram Sudhakar Reddy	CPI	340,867	31.60	152,982	14.18
14	Bhongir	K. Raj Gopal Reddy	INC	504,103	44.70	Nomula Narsimhaiah Yadav	CPM	364,215	32.29	139,888	12.41
15	Warangal	Rajaiah Siricilla	INC	396,568	38.48	Ramagalla Parameshwar	TRS	271,907	26.39	124,661	12.09
16	Mahabubabad	P. Balram	INC	394,447	39.59	Kunja Srinivasa Rao	CPI	325,490	32.67	68,957	6.92
17	Khammam	Nama Nageswara Rao	TDP	469,368	45.39	Renuka Chowdhury	INC	344,920	33.36	124,448	12.03
18	Aruku	Kishore Chandra Deo	INC	360,458	45.49	Babu Rao Mediyam	CPM	168,014	21.20	192,444	24.29
19	Srikakulam	Killi Krupa Rani	INC	387,694	42.20	Kinjarapu Yerran Naidu	TDP	304,707	33.16	82,987	9.04
20	Vizianagaram	Botsa Jhansi Lakshmi	INC	411,584	40.36	Kondapalli Appala Naidu	TDP	351,013	34.42	60,571	5.94
21	Visakhapatnam	Daggubati Purandeswari	INC	368,812	36.43	Palla Srinivasa Rao	PRP	302,126	29.85	66,686	6.58
22	Anakapalli	Sabbam Hari	INC	369,968	35.30	N. Surya Prakasa Rao	TDP	317,056	30.25	52,912	5.05
23	Kakinada	M. M. Pallam Raju	INC	323,607	33.51	Chalamalasetty Sunil	PRP	289,563	29.99	34,044	3.52
24	Amalapuram	G. V. Harsha Kumar	INC	368,501	35.99	Pothula Prameela Devi	PRP	328,496	32.09	40,005	3.90
25	Rajahmundry	Vundavalli Aruna Kumar	INC	357,449	35.12	Murali Mohan	TDP	355,302	34.91	2,147	0.21
26	Narsapuram	Kanumuri Bapi Raju	INC	389,422	39.30	Thota Sita Rama Lakshmi	TDP	274,732	27.72	114,690	11.58
27	Eluru	Kavuri Samba Siva Rao	INC	423,777	39.28	Maganti Venkateswara Rao	TDP	380,994	35.31	42,783	3.97
28	Machilipatnam	Konakalla Narayana Rao	TDP	409,936	39.19	Badiga Ramakrishna	INC	397,480	38.00	12,456	1.19
29	Vijayawada	Lagadapati Rajagopal	INC	429,394	39.46	Vallabhaneni Vamsi Mohan	TDP	416,682	38.29	12,712	1.17
30	Guntur	R. Sambasiva Rao	INC	403,937	38.66	Madala Rajendra	TDP	364,582	34.90	39,355	3.76
31	Narasaraopet	M. Venugopala Reddy	TDP	463,358	42.83	Vallabhaneni Balashowry	INC	461,751	42.69	1,607	0.14
32	Bapatla	Panabaka Lakshmi	INC	460,757	44.15	Malyadri Sriram	TDP	391,419	37.51	69,338	6.64
33	Ongole	M. Sreenivasulu Reddy	INC	450,442	44.10	M. Malakondaiah Yadav	TDP	371,919	36.41	78,523	7.69
34	Nandyal	S. P. Y. Reddy	INC	400,023	40.21	N. Md. Farooq	TDP	309,176	31.08	90,847	9.13
35	Kurnool	K. J. Prakasha Reddy	INC	382,668	43.92	B. T. Naidu	TDP	308,895	35.45	73,773	8.47
36	Anantapur	Anantha Venkatarami Reddy	INC	457,876	45.78	Kalava Srinivasulu	TDP	379,955	37.99	77,921	7.79
37	Hindupur	Kristappa Nimmala	TDP	435,753	42.45	P. Khasim Khan	INC	412,918	40.23	22,835	2.22
38	Kadapa	Y. S. Jagan Mohan Reddy	INC	542,611	52.87	Palem Srikanth Reddy	TDP	363,765	35.44	178,846	17.43
39	Nellore	M. Rajamohan Reddy	INC	430,235	42.92	Vanteru Venu Gopala Reddy	TDP	375,242	37.43	54,993	5.49
40	Tirupati	Chinta Mohan	INC	428,403	40.36	Varla Ramaiah	TDP	409,127	38.54	19,276	1.82
41	Rajampet	A. Sai Prathap	INC	423,910	42.58	Ramesh Reddappagari	TDP	313,533	31.49	110,377	11.09
42	Chittoor	Naramalli Sivaprasad	TDP	434,376	41.59	M. Thippeswamy	INC	423,717	40.57	10,659	1.02

== By-elections (2009-2014) ==
S.No	Date	Constituency	MP before election	Party before election	Elected MP	Party after election
38	8 May 2011	Kadapa	Y. S. Jagan Mohan Reddy	Indian National Congress	Y. S. Jagan Mohan Reddy	YSR Congress Party
39	12 June 2012	Nellore	Mekapati Rajamohan Reddy	Indian National Congress	Mekapati Rajamohan Reddy	YSR Congress Party

== Post-election Union Council of Ministers from Andhra Pradesh ==
#	Name	Constituency	Designation	Department	From	To	Party
1	Jaipal Reddy	Chelvella	Cabinet Minister	Urban Development	28 May 2009	19 Jan 2011	INC
1	Jaipal Reddy	Chelvella	Cabinet Minister	Petroleum and Natural Gas	19 Jan 2011	28 Oct 2012	INC
1	Jaipal Reddy	Chelvella	Cabinet Minister	Science and Technology; Earth Sciences	28 Oct 2012	26 May 2014	INC
2	Jairam Ramesh	Andhra Pradesh (Rajya Sabha)	MoS(I/C)	Environment and Forests	28 May 2009	12 July 2011	INC
2	Jairam Ramesh	Andhra Pradesh (Rajya Sabha)	Cabinet Minister	Rural Development	12 July 2011	26 May 2014	INC
2	Jairam Ramesh	Andhra Pradesh (Rajya Sabha)	Cabinet Minister	Drinking Water and Sanitation (Addl. Charge)	13 July 2011	28 Oct 2012	INC
3	Kishore Chandra Deo	Aruku	Cabinet Minister	Tribal Affairs; Panchayati Raj	12 July 2011	26 May 2014	INC
4	M. M. Pallam Raju	Kakinada	MoS	Defence	28 May 2009	28 Oct 2012	INC
4	M. M. Pallam Raju	Kakinada	Cabinet Minister	Human Resource Development	28 Oct 2012	26 May 2014	INC
5	Kavuri Samba Siva Rao	Eluru	Cabinet Minister	Textiles	17 June 2013	3 Apr 2014	INC
6	K. Chiranjeevi	Andhra Pradesh (Rajya Sabha)	MoS(I/C)	Tourism	28 Oct 2012	26 May 2014	INC
7	Daggubati Purandeswari	Visakhapatnam	MoS	Human Resource Development	28 May 2009	28 Oct 2012	INC
7	Daggubati Purandeswari	Visakhapatnam	MoS	Commerce and Industry	28 Oct 2012	11 Mar 2014	INC
8	Panabaka Lakshmi	Bapatla	MoS	Textiles	28 May 2009	31 Oct 2012	INC
8	Panabaka Lakshmi	Bapatla	MoS	Petroleum and Natural Gas	31 Oct 2012	26 May 2014	INC
9	Annayyagari Sai Prathap	Rajampet	MoS	Steel	28 May 2009	19 Jan 2011	INC
9	Annayyagari Sai Prathap	Rajampet	MoS	Heavy Industries & Public Enterprises	19 Jan 2011	12 July 2011	INC
10	Kotla Jayasurya Prakasha Reddy	Kurnool	MoS	Railways	28 Oct 2012	26 May 2014	INC
11	Killi Krupa Rani	Srikakulam	MoS	Communications and Information Technology	28 Oct 2012	26 May 2014	INC
12	Sarve Satyanarayana	Malkajgiri	MoS	Road Transport and Highways	28 Oct 2012	26 May 2014	INC
13	Balram Naik	Mahabubabad	MoS	Social Justice & Empowerment	28 Oct 2012	26 May 2014	INC
14	Jesudasu Seelam	Andhra Pradesh (Rajya Sabha)	MoS	Finance	17 June 2013	26 May 2014	INC

== Assembly Segment wise lead ==
Party	Assembly segments	Position in Assembly (as of 2009 election)
Indian National Congress	194	156
Telugu Desam Party	61	92
Praja Rajyam Party	14	18
Telangana Rashtra Samithi	17	10
All India Majlis-e-Ittehadul Muslimeen	6	7
Communist Party of India	1	4
Bharatiya Janata Party	1	2
Others	0	5
Total	294	
