= Alai Balai =

Cultural event

- Frequency: Annual
- Location: Hyderabad
- Attendance: 50,000
- Organiser: Bandaru Dattatreya

Alai Balai is an annual cultural event held in Hyderabad, India, during the Hindu festival Navaratri and just before the Dussehra festival. Alai Balai includes food and traditional entertainment specific to the culture of the Indian state of Telangana.

== History ==
The Alai Balai event was first organized by politician Bandaru Dattatreya in 2005. He has described the event as Alai Balai is "all about meeting, greeting, eating, coupled with fun and frolic".

Although Dattatreya has described the event as a social gathering and not political, politicians of all parties attend Alai Balai.
