= T. Anjaiah =

Indian politician

Tanguturi Anjaiah
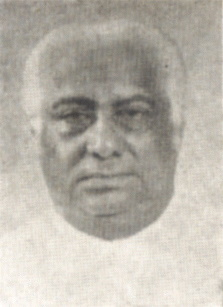

7th Chief Minister of Andhra Pradesh
- In office 11 October 1980 – 24 February 1982
- Governor: K. C. Abraham
- Preceded by: Marri Chenna Reddy
- Succeeded by: Bhavanam Venkatarami Reddy

Member of Parliament, Lok Sabha
- In office 31 December 1984 – 27 November 1986
- Preceded by: P. Shiv Shankar
- Succeeded by: T. Manemma
- Constituency: Secunderabad

Personal details
- Born: Tanguturi Anjaiah; 16 August 1919 Bhanoor, British India
- Died: 18 October 1986 (aged 67 years)
- Party: Congress (I)
- Spouse: T. Manemma
- Children: 1 son and 4 daughters

Tanguturi Anjaiah (1919–1986), popularly known as T. Anjaiah, was an Indian politician who served as the 7th Chief Minister of Andhra Pradesh from October 1980 to February 1982. He won from Ramayampet Assembly Constituency.

== Electoral history ==
Year	Constituency	Party	Votes	Opponent		Result	Margin
1962	Musheerabad	INC	16,844	CPI	N. Satyanarayana Reddy	Won	8,083
1967	Musheerabad	INC	16,811	CPI	S. N. Reddy	Won	3,800
1972	Musheerabad	INC	29,198	CPI	M. A. Razzack	Won	20,364
1978	Musheerabad	INC(I)	23,071	JNP	Naini Narasimha Reddy	Lost	-2,167
1983	Ramayampet	INC	35,235	BJP	Ramannagari Srinivasa Reddy	Won	16,833
1984	Secunderabad	INC	246,309	BJP	Bandaru Dattatreya	Won	8,474

== Background ==
Tanguturi Anjaiah was born on August 16, 1919. His parents belonged to Bhanoor village in Medak district. Anjaiah studied in Sultan Bazar High school. He couldn't pursue further education after matriculation due to financial difficulties so he started working at Hyderabad Allwyn for a daily wage of 4 anna (equal to 24 paisa). Anjaiah faced many adversities in his early life which made him a fighter for the cause of social justice.

=== Caste controversy ===
As per Anjaiah's grandson, Abhishek Reddy, Anjaiah's real name was Ramakrishna Reddy, and he belonged to the Reddy caste, rather than to the Dalit community as was believed. But, others alleged that Anjaiah belonged to a Backward Caste or a Scheduled Caste (Dalit) community and had changed his name to Ramakrishna Reddy and got into marital alliances with Reddys to garner the support of the politically powerful Reddy community for his Chief Ministerial tenure. Various scholars in the 1970s noted that Anjaiah belonged to the toddy-tapper community, a Backward Caste.

== Career ==
T. Anjaiah rose from being a worker at Hyderabad Allwyn Limited in Hyderabad to a trade union leader and later Union Labour Minister.

T. Anjaiah was nominated by the then ruling party Indian National Congress to replace Marri Chenna Reddy as Chief Minister on 11 October 1980. At the time of nomination, Anjaiah was the union minister of state for Labour. Anjaiah inducted all 15 dissident members of Chenna Reddy cabinet and formed the biggest state ministry the country had ever known, with 60, 61 or even 72 cabinet positions, more than in the Union government portfolio at the time. This "Airbus cabinet", as Anjaiah dubbed it, was claimed to be a way to ensure all regions of the state would have equal access to development, but was widely mocked as an example of mere patronage and became a source of embarrassment for the central government. Finding it initially difficult to shrink the cabinet, he eventually took the step of asking all ministers to resign in January 1981. He later reduced it to 45 members, with leaving members being offered positions as chairs of state enterprises which offered much of the same personal benefits.

As the Chief Minister of Andhra Pradesh, he was known for his accommodating politics.

The two young uprising politicians at that time, Dr. Y. S. Rajasekhara Reddy and N. Chandrababu Naidu, gained importance during Anjaiah's term as Chief Minister. A proposal to make NTR a member of the Rajya Sabha was made during this time. Anjaiah was a mentor of P. Janardhan Reddy.

=== 1982: Rajiv Gandhi airport incident ===
In 1982, Rajiv Gandhi, then the AICC general secretary, visited Andhra Pradesh on a ‘private’ visit. Anjaiah, who then was the Chief Minister, spent 2.5 million rupees on an elaborate ceremony. He arrived at the Begumpet airport amidst a crowd of about 200 waiting to welcome him, armed with garlands and with his entire cabinet in attendance. Having previously been mocked for a similarly extravagant arrival at the Indian Youth Congress meeting in Bangalore a few weeks earlier, an angry Rajiv was enraged by the pomp and pageantry and the euphoric, dancing crowd beating drums outside the airport. As a former pilot, he was particularly irritated by the landing apron being used as a stage for this ceremony, which ran against aviation security rules. Multiple reports claim that Gandhi, in a moment of anger, publicly insulted Anjaiah referring to him as a 'buffoon' and that Anjaiah was in tears when the tirade ended. Back in Delhi, Rajiv was said to have convinced Indira Gandhi to sack Anjaiah. While giving up his post, Anjaiah was reported to have remarked that he came to power by the ‘grace of Madam’ and he was leaving under her orders, but he did not know why he had come or why he had to leave.

Rajiv's treatment of Anjaiah was widely criticized, being considered humiliating to the representative of the state. The incident was noted to be crucial in the Congress Party tasting its first-ever defeat in Andhra Pradesh in the 1983 Assembly elections. The Telugu Desam Party led by Nandamuri Taraka Rama Rao used the insult as an affront to "Telugu vari athmagauravam" (Telugus' self-respect) to arguably help the voters see how the Telugus were perceived by the Gandhis and won the assembly elections with a thumping majority.

=== Dismissal ===
T. Anjaiah had many opponents including some of the ministers in his party after the Congress party lost Municipal elections in Visakhapatnam and Vijayawada. Indira Gandhi the then prime minister of India asked him to step down on February 13, Anjaiah tendered his resignation officially seven days later on February 20, 1982. Anjaiah as a leader without followers could evoke unimaginable public sympathy. At his last public appearance as the chief minister, the day before he resigned Anjaiah was cheered by a 30,000-strong crowd. C. Jagannath Rao, who served in his cabinet as a home minister recalls him as, "Whatever one may say against him, his remarkable simplicity endeared him to the people.

Reddy replaced T. Anjaiah on February 24, 1982. Reddy himself was a dissident minister in the Marri Chenna Reddy ministry. T. Anjaiah was elected as Member of Parliament in 1984 from Secundrabad constituency.

== Notable work ==
T. Anjaiah's earliest act as Chief Minister was to conduct elections for the Panchayati Raj bodies and Municipalities. It was the first time that Sarpanches of the Grama Panchayats and Presidents of Panchayathi Samithis were elected directly by the electorate. It was also in his term that the age for voting eligibility was reduced from 21 to 18. Anjaiah received much appreciation for this bold step.

T. Anjaiah offered help to Dr.Prathap C. Reddy to start a hospital in Andhra Pradesh. Anjaiah indeed lived up to his promise by offering 7 acres of land at the heart of the city at Sanjeevaih Park.

T. Anjaiah's Chief Minister relief fund sponsored Hyderabad's first kidney transplant surgery in 1982. The idea of making the film on Tanguturi Prakasam came to Vijayachander on the motivation by T. Anjaiah in one of his speeches, that Government would provide financial assistance to such ventures. It was under the tenure of T. Anjaiah, Buddha Purnima Project Authority was conceptualized in 1991 including the decision to unveil a gigantic statue of the Buddha on the rock, amid the placid waters of the Hussain Sagar lake.

== Honors ==
Lumbini Park in Hyderabad was renamed as T. Anjaiah Lumbini park in his memory in 2006.

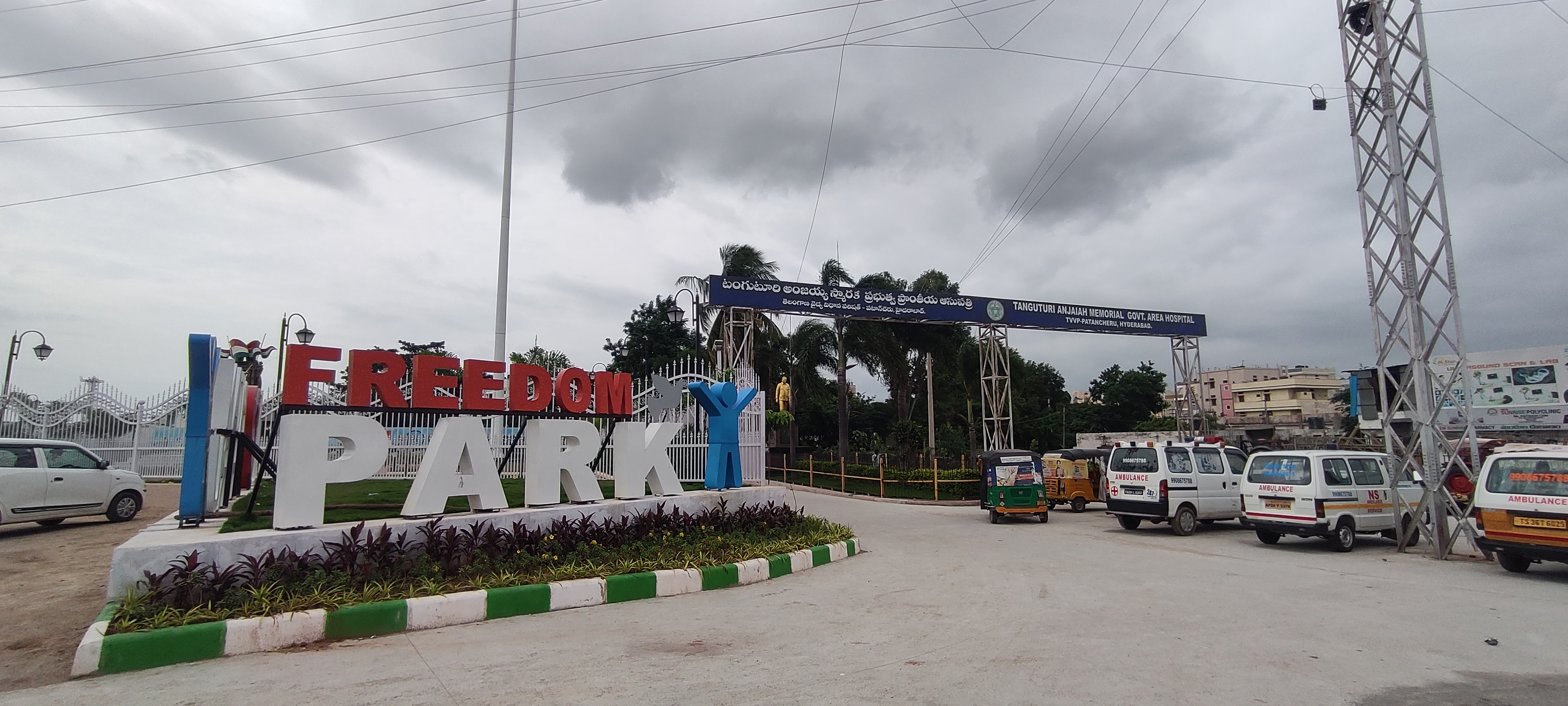
Tanguturi Anjaiah Memorial Hospital

Chief Minister Y.S. Rajasekhara Reddy unveiled the statue of former Chief Minister late T. Anjaiah at Lumbini Park, opposite Secretariat in 2006.

== Personal life ==
Anjaiah was married to T. Manemma. They have one son and four daughters. His family lived in Barkatpura Hyderabad until and after few years of his death.

Anjaiah was in public life till his sudden death in 1986. After his death, his wife T. Manemma served as a Secunderabad MP for 2 Terms and as the Member of the Legislative Assembly for Musheerabad 2 terms.

== See also ==
- List of chief ministers of Andhra Pradesh
