= Bandaru Dattatreya =

Indian politician

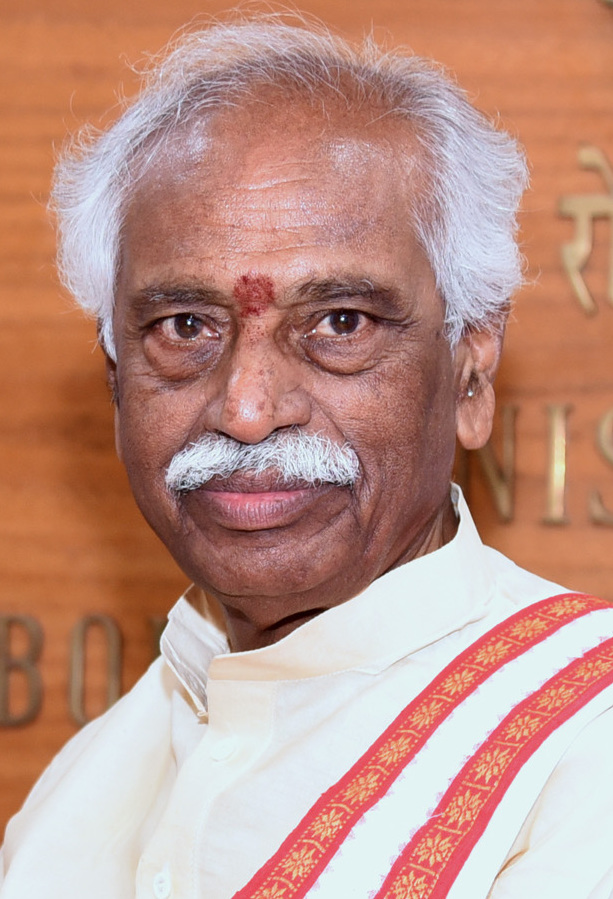

18th Governor of Haryana
- In office 7 July 2021 – 21 July 2025
- Chief Minister: Manohar Lal Khattar; Nayab Singh Saini
- Preceded by: Satyadev Narayan Arya
- Succeeded by: Ashim Kumar Ghosh

20th Governor of Himachal Pradesh
- In office 11 September 2019 – 6 July 2021
- Chief Minister: Jai Ram Thakur
- Preceded by: Kalraj Mishra
- Succeeded by: Rajendra Arlekar

Minister of State (Independent Charge) for Labour and Employment
- In office 9 November 2014 – 1 September 2017
- Prime Minister: Narendra Modi
- Preceded by: Narendra Singh Tomar
- Succeeded by: Santosh Gangwar

10th President of the Bharatiya Janata Party Andhra Pradesh
- In office 2007 - 2010
- National President: Rajnath Singh; Nitin Gadkari
- Preceded by: N. Indrasena Reddy
- Succeeded by: G. Kishan Reddy

Member of Parliament, Lok Sabha
- In office 16 May 2014 – 23 May 2019
- Preceded by: Anjan Kumar Yadav
- Succeeded by: G. Kishan Reddy
- Constituency: Secunderabad
- In office 10 March 1998 – 16 May 2004
- Preceded by: P.V. Rajeshwar Rao
- Succeeded by: Anjan Kumar Yadav
- Constituency: Secunderabad
- In office 20 June 1991 – 10 May 1996
- Preceded by: T. Manemma
- Succeeded by: P. V. Rajeshwar Rao
- Constituency: Secunderabad

Personal details
- Born: 12 June 1947 (age 79) Hyderabad, Hyderabad State, British India (present-day Telangana, India)
- Party: Bharatiya Janata Party
- Spouse: Vasantha (m. 1989)
- Children: 3
- Education: Osmania University (B.Sc)
- Profession: Social worker
- Cabinet: Second Vajpayee ministry Third Vajpayee ministry Modi ministry

Bandaru Dattatreya (born 12 June 1947) is an Indian politician and the former governor of the State of Haryana from 2021 till 2025. He was also the 20th governor of Himachal Pradesh and was the member of Lok Sabha for Secunderabad from 2014 to 2019. He belongs to the Bharatiya Janata Party (BJP).

Born in Hyderabad, Dattatreya graduated with a science degree. He joined Rashtriya Swayamsevak Sangh in 1965 and was imprisoned during The Emergency. In 1991, he was elected to the Lok Sabha from Secunderabad constituency for the first time. In 1997, he was appointed party president for the state unit. In 1998, he was re-elected and served as Union Minister of State for Urban Development in the second Vajpayee ministry. He was elected for a third consecutive time in 1999 and again served as a Minister of State in third Vajpayee ministry. He lost the Lok Sabha election in 2004 and 2009. The party appointed him as national vice-president in 2013. In May 2014, he was re-elected to the Lok Sabha from his former constituency. In November he was made a Minister of State for Labour and Employment in the Modi ministry and became the lone minister from Telangana.

== Early life ==
Dattatreya was born on 12 June 1947 to Bandaru Anjaiah and Eswaramma at the city of Hyderabad, in Hyderabad State. He received B.Sc. degree from Osmania University.

== Political career ==
Dattatreya began his political career and joined Rashtriya Swayamsevak Sangh in 1965. He served as a pracharak (propagator) of the organisation from 1965 to 1968. He also served as state joint secretary of Loka Sangarsha Samiti (Jayaprakash Narayan-led Total Revolution Movement) and was imprisoned during the Emergency in the 1970s.

In 1980, Dattatreya officially joined the Bharatiya Janata Party (BJP). He was appointed general secretary of the party's Andhra Pradesh unit. He served in that position until 1989.fbr>

Dattatreya was elected to the Lok Sabha from the Secunderabad constituency In 1991. He defeated his nearest rival T. Manemma Anjaiah of the Indian National Congress by a margin of 85,063 votes. He was the only BJP candidate to win from Andhra Pradesh. In 1997, he became president of the party's Andhra Pradesh unit.

P.V. Rajeshwara Rao defeated Dattatreya in the general election held in 1996. However, two years later, he defeated Rao by a margin of 185,910 votes and was re-elected to the Lok Sabha from the Secunderabad constituency. Rediff.com wrote that the party won four constituencies in the state due to his efforts. He served as Union Minister of State (MoS) for Urban Development in the second Vajpayee ministry from 1998 to 1999.

In 1999, Dattatreya was elected to the Lok Sabha for the third time. Between 1999 and 2001, he again served as Union MoS for Urban Development in the third Vajpayee ministry. From 2001 to 2003, he served as Union MoS for Railways. In 2003, he was again given the Urban Development portfolio.

Dattatreya lost the 2004 Indian general election. In the same year, he became the national secretary of the party, a post which he held until 2006. In 2006, he was appointed president of the party's state unit. Three years later, he became a national executive member of the party. In the 2009 Indian general election, he lost his constituency for the second time. He was appointed the national vice-president of the party in 2013.

In May 2014, Dattatreya was re-elected to the Lok Sabha for the fourth time from the Secunderabad constituency. On 9 November, he was made a MoS Labour and Employment. He became the lone minister in the Modi ministry from the state of Telangana. On 1 September 2017, he resigned from his post. Subsequently, he was made a member of the standing committee on Finance.

On 21 March 2019, the BJP replaced Dattatreya with former MLA G. Kishan Reddy as its candidate from Secunderabad for the upcoming Lok Sabha elections. He was appointed the Governor of Himachal Pradesh in the year 2019.

On 18 July 2021, Dattatreya was appointed the 18th Governor of Haryana.

== Electoral history ==
Year	Constituency	Party	Votes	Opponent		Result	Margin
1984	Secunderabad	BJP	237,835	INC	T. Anjaiah	Lost	-8,474
1989	Maharajgunj	BJP	26,294	INC	M. Mukesh	Lost	-2,596
1991	Secunderabad	BJP	253,924	INC	T. Manemma	Won	85,063
1996	Secunderabad	BJP	206,302	INC	P. V. Rajeshwar Rao	Lost	-214,358
1998	Secunderabad	BJP	438,586	INC	P. V. Rajeshwar Rao	Won	185,910
1999	Secunderabad	BJP	506,626	INC	Nadendla Bhaskara Rao	Won	97,626
2004	Secunderabad	BJP	416,952	INC	Anjan Kumar Yadav	Lost	-68,758
2009	Secunderabad	BJP	170,382	INC	Anjan Kumar Yadav	Lost	-170,167
2014	Secunderabad	BJP	438,271	INC	Anjan Kumar Yadav	Won	254,735

== Personal life ==
Dattatreya married Vasantha on 17 May 1989. In November 2016, their daughter Vijaya Lakshmi married Jignesh Reddy, the son of chevella parliament constituency contested Janardan Reddy. On 24 May 2018, their son Vaishnav died of heart attack at the age of 21.

Dattatreya has also served as joint secretary of A. P. Cyclone Committee and general secretary for Voluntary Organisations, India.

=== Image ===
According to The Hindu, "Dattatreya is seen as the most non-controversial and acceptable BJP leader in Telangana". Business Standard wrote that he is simple, soft-spoken and has a down-to-earth nature.

== Legal issues ==
In January 2016, Dattatreya was charged with abetting the suicide of Rohith Vemula, a student at the University of Hyderabad. Following allegations that he was instrumental in getting Vemula along with four other students suspended from the university's hostel, he was booked under the Scheduled Caste and Scheduled Tribe (Prevention of Atrocities) Act. The previous August, he wrote a letter to Smriti Irani, the minister of Human Resource Development claiming the university had turned into a "den of casteist, extremist and anti-national politics". Dattatreya denied any wrongdoing and claimed that he had received the letter from Akhil Bharatiya Vidyarthi Parishad and just forwarded it to Irani with his official letterhead. Other students of the university claimed that his letter was a "part of the larger discrimination of Dalit students".

Lok Sabha
Preceded by T Maniamma	Member of Parliament for Secunderabad; 1991 – 1996	Succeeded by P.V. Rajeshwar Rao
Preceded by P.V. Rajeshwar Rao	Member of Parliament for Secunderabad; 1998 – 2004	Succeeded by Anjan Kumar Yadav
Preceded by Anjan Kumar Yadav	Member of Parliament for Secunderabad; 2014 – 2019	Succeeded by G. Kishan Reddy
Political offices
Preceded by Narendra Singh Tomar	Minister of Labour and Employment; 9 November 2014 – 1 September 2017; Minister of State (Independent Charge)	Succeeded by Santosh Gangwar; Minister of State (Independent Charge)
Preceded by Kalraj Mishra	Governor of Himachal Pradesh; 11 September 2019 – 8 July 2021	Succeeded by Rajendra Arlekar
Preceded by Satyadev Narayan Arya	Governor of Haryana; 7 July 2021 – 20 July 2025	Succeeded by Ashim Kumar Ghosh
