= 1984 Indian general election in Andhra Pradesh =

- December 1984

42 seats
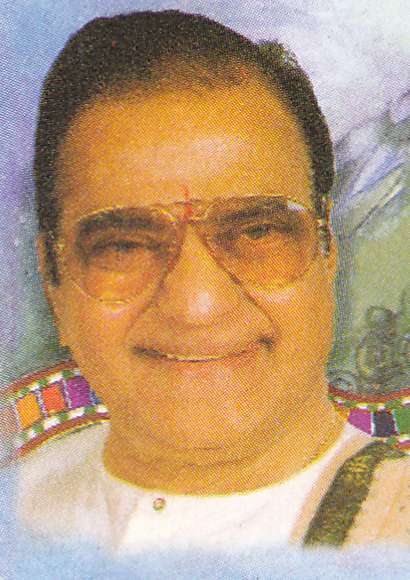

	First party	Second party
Leader	N. T. Rama Rao	Jalagam Vengala Rao
Party	TDP	INC(I)
Alliance	Nonpartisan	Congress alliance
Leader's seat	Did not contest	Khammam
Last election	New	41
Seats won	30	6
Seat change	New	▼35
Popular vote	10,132,859	9,452,394
Percentage	44.82%	41.81%
Swing	New	▼14.43%
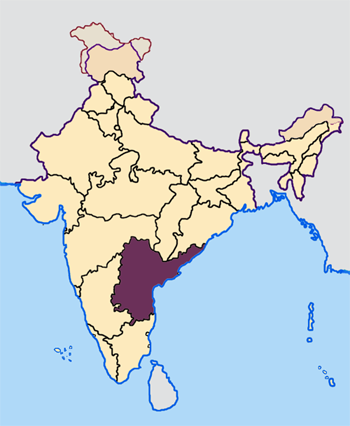
- Andhra Pradesh
Prime Minister before election
Rajiv Gandhi
INC
Prime Minister after election
Rajiv Gandhi
INC

The 1984 Indian general election in Andhra Pradesh were held for 42 seats in the state. The result was a big victory for the Telugu Desam Party which won 31 out of 42 seats.

== Parties and Alliances ==
=== Telugu Desam Party+ ===
Telugu Desam Party led Alliance

Party	Flag	Symbol	Leader	Seats contested
Telugu Desam Party			N. T. Rama Rao	34
Communist Party of India (Marxist)				2
Communist Party of India				1 + 2
Bharatiya Janata Party			L. K. Advani	2
Indian Congress (Socialist)			Kishore Chandra Deo	1
Independent			Marri Chenna Reddy	1
Janata Party			Jaipal Reddy	1
Total				42 + 2

=== Indian National Congress ===
Indian National Congress

Party	Flag	Symbol	Leader	Seats contested
Indian National Congress			Jalagam Vengala Rao	42

== Results ==
=== Vote share ===
Vote share by party in Andhra Pradesh
1. Telugu Desam Party (44.8%)
2. Indian National Congress (41.8%)
3. Independents (5.28%)
4. Bharatiya Janata Party (2.22%)
5. Communist Party of India (1.85%)
6. Communist Party of India (Marxist) (1.78%)
7. Janata Party (1.21%)
8. Indian Congress (Socialist) (1.03%)

=== Seat share ===
Seat share by party in Andhra Pradesh
1. Telugu Desam Party (71.4%)
2. Indian National Congress (14.3%)
3. Bharatiya Janata Party (2.38%)
4. Communist Party of India (2.38%)
5. Communist Party of India (Marxist) (2.38%)
6. Indian Congress (Socialist) (2.38%)
7. Janata Party (2.38%)
8. Independents (2.38%)

== Voting and results ==
Alliance/ Party		Popular vote			Seats		
Alliance/ Party		Votes	%	±pp	Contested	Won	+/−
TDP+	TDP	1,01,32,859	44.82	New entry	34	30	▲30
TDP+	BJP	5,01,597	2.22	New entry	2	1	▲1
TDP+	CPI	4,18,882	1.85	▼1.83	1 + 2	1	▲1
TDP+	CPI(M)	4,01,582	1.78	▼1.78	2	1	▲1
TDP+	JP	2,74,064	1.21	▼14.03	1	1	▲1
TDP+	IC(S)	2,33,175	1.03	New entry	1	1	▲1
TDP+	IND	1,64,750	0.73	New entry	1	0	Steady
TDP+	Total	1,21,26,951	53.64	Steady	42 + 2	35	Steady
INC		94,52,394	41.81	▼14.43	42	6	▼35
IND		10,29,743	4.55	▼3.02	213	1	▲1
Total		2,26,09,046	100%	-	299	42	-

== List of MPs won ==
Constituency			Winner				Runner Up				Margin	%
#	Name	Poll %	Candidate	Party	Votes	%	Candidate	Party	Votes	%	Margin	%
1	Srikakulam	72.72%	Appayyadora Hanumantu	TDP	298,167	60.68	Boddepalli Rajagopala Rao	INC	173,699	35.35	124,468	25.33
2	Parvathipuram (ST)	65.64%	Kishore Chandra Deo	ICS	233,175	54.49	Narasimha Rao Viswasa Rayi	INC	184,495	43.11	48,680	11.38
3	Bobbili	74.64%	Anand Gajapathi Raju Poosapati	TDP	315,156	61.95	Penumatsa Sambasiva Raju	INC	177,573	34.90	137,583	27.05
4	Visakhapatnam	64.16%	Bhattam Srirama Murthy	TDP	334,399	61.10	Appalaswamy Kommuru	INC	193,968	35.44	140,431	25.66
5	Bhadrachalam (ST)	54.63%	Sode Ramaiah	CPI	195,618	50.30	B. Radhabai Anandrao	INC	170,978	43.97	24,640	6.33
6	Anakapalli	67.87%	Appalanarasimham P.	TDP	322,347	65.80	Appalanaidy S.R.A.S.	INC	147,531	30.11	174,816	35.69
7	Kakinada	72.18%	Thota Gopala Krishna	TDP	344,038	60.38	Sanjeeva Rao M.S.	INC	214,324	37.62	129,714	22.76
8	Rajahmundry	76.51%	Srihari Rao	TDP	381,091	62.04	Satyanarayana Rao S.B.P.B.K.	INC	227,213	36.99	153,878	25.05
9	Amalapuram (SC)	75.92%	Aithabathula Jogeswara Venkata	TDP	317,481	61.24	Kusuma Krishna Murthy	INC	197,750	38.15	119,731	23.09
10	Narasapur	72.84%	Vijaya Kumar Raju Bhupathiraju	TDP	366,534	65.89	Alluri Subhaschandra Bose	INC	170,160	30.59	196,374	35.30
11	Eluru	76.24%	Bolla Bulli Ramaiah	TDP	351,340	59.21	Vatti Venkata Ranga Partha Sarathi	INC	239,688	40.40	111,652	18.81
12	Machilipatnam	74.75%	Sambasivarao Kuvuru	INC	272,513	49.84	Vaddi Rangarao	TDP	263,420	48.17	9,093	1.67
13	Vijayawada	73.31%	Vadde Sobhanadreswara Rao	TDP	318,023	50.97	Chennupati Vidya	INC	289,579	46.41	28,444	4.56
14	Tenali	70.91%	Nissankararao Venkataratnam	TDP	256,766	50.25	Basav Punnayya Singam	INC	246,328	48.21	10,438	2.04
15	Guntur	67.37%	N. G. Ranga	INC	293,589	49.52	Chandraskhara Rao Movva	TDP	281,695	47.51	11,894	2.01
16	Bapatla	69.34%	Chimata Sambu	TDP	290,492	52.14	Rajeswara Rao Maddirala	INC	256,072	45.96	34,420	6.18
17	Narasaraopet	68.09%	Katuri Narayanaswamy	TDP	295,059	49.87	Kasu Bramananda Reddy	INC	280,821	47.46	14,238	2.41
18	Ongole	65.75%	Bezawada Papireddy	TDP	287,662	50.89	Venkata Reddy Puli	INC	269,519	47.68	18,143	3.21
19	Nellore (SC)	65.18%	Penchalaiah Puchalapalli	TDP	296,284	54.09	Orepalli Venkata Subbaiah	INC	242,733	44.31	53,551	9.78
20	Tirupati (SC)	71.30%	Chinta Mohan	TDP	318,467	52.89	Penchalaiah Pasala	INC	283,686	47.11	34,781	5.78
21	Chittoor	76.31%	N.P. Jhansi Lakshmi	TDP	332,543	54.54	Amaranadha Reddy Nallari	INC	271,332	44.50	61,211	10.04
22	Rajampet	64.74%	Palakondrayudu Sugavasi	TDP	298,060	60.37	A. Sai Prathap	INC	180,913	36.64	117,147	23.73
23	Cuddapah	72.89%	D.N. Reddy	TDP	332,915	52.11	Obula Reddy Kandula	INC	278,607	43.61	54,308	8.50
24	Hindupur	71.75%	K. Ramachandra Reddy	TDP	349,239	63.14	D. Reddappa Reddy	INC	193,902	35.06	155,337	28.08
25	Anantapur	65.51%	Devneni Narayana Swamy	TDP	302,307	59.14	Daruru Pullaiah	INC	193,658	37.88	108,649	21.26
26	Kurnool	68.84%	Erasu Ayyapu Reddy	TDP	253,832	49.94	Kotla Vijaya Bhaskara Reddy	INC	246,542	48.51	7,290	1.43
27	Nandyal	70.47%	Maddur Subba Reddy	TDP	298,420	54.14	Pendekanti Venkata Subbaiah	INC	248,157	45.02	50,263	9.12
28	Nagarkurnool (SC)	66.70%	V. Tulsiram	TDP	301,089	57.67	Anantharamulu Mallu	INC	211,952	40.60	89,137	17.07
29	Mahabubnagar	64.39%	Sudini Jaipal Reddy	JNP	274,064	51.89	Mallikarjun	INC	193,961	36.72	80,103	15.17
30	Hyderabad	76.76%	Sultan Salahuddin Owaisi	IND	222,187	38.13	K. Prahbakara Reddy	TDP	218,706	37.53	3,481	0.60
31	Secunderabad	59.93%	T. Anjaiah	INC	246,309	49.02	Bandaru Dattatreya	BJP	237,835	47.33	8,474	1.69
32	Siddipet (SC)	67.63%	G. Vijayarama Rao	TDP	253,243	46.61	Yelliah Nandi	INC	239,042	44.00	14,201	2.61
33	Medak	67.61%	P. Manik Reddy	TDP	263,524	48.21	P. Shiv Shanker	INC	261,708	47.87	1,816	0.34
34	Nizamabad	70.02%	Tadur Bala Goud	INC	251,172	48.64	M. Narayan Reddy	TDP	248,725	48.17	2,447	0.47
35	Adilabad	63.52%	C. Madhav Reddy	TDP	238,440	55.66	C. Narisimha Reddy	INC	183,882	42.93	54,558	12.73
36	Peddapalli (SC)	57.29%	Gotte Bhoopathy	TDP	246,334	51.98	Ganta Srihari	INC	199,376	42.07	46,958	9.91
37	Karimnagar	59.31%	Juvvadi Chokkarao	INC	243,357	50.46	Chenna Reddy M.	IND	164,750	34.16	78,607	16.30
38	Hanamkonda	67.68%	Chandupatla Janga Reddy	BJP	263,762	52.40	P. V. Narasimha Rao	INC	209,564	41.63	54,198	10.77
39	Warangal	73.69%	T. Kalpana Devi	TDP	232,088	43.56	Kamaluddin Ahmed	INC	223,632	41.98	8,456	1.58
40	Khammam	75.27%	Jalagam Vengala Rao	INC	261,056	44.70	Nallamala Prasad Rao	CPI	169,557	29.04	91,499	15.66
41	Nalgonda	67.40%	Mallareddy Raguma Reddy	TDP	324,973	59.21	Damodar Reddy Tummalpally	INC	210,563	38.37	114,410	20.84
42	Miryalguda	72.67%	Bhimreddy Narsimha Reddy	CPM	282,973	46.93	Chakilam Sreenivasa Rao	INC	241,218	40.01	41,755	6.92

== See also ==
- Elections in Andhra Pradesh
