= Anjan Kumar Yadav =

Indian politician

M. Anjan Kumar Yadav
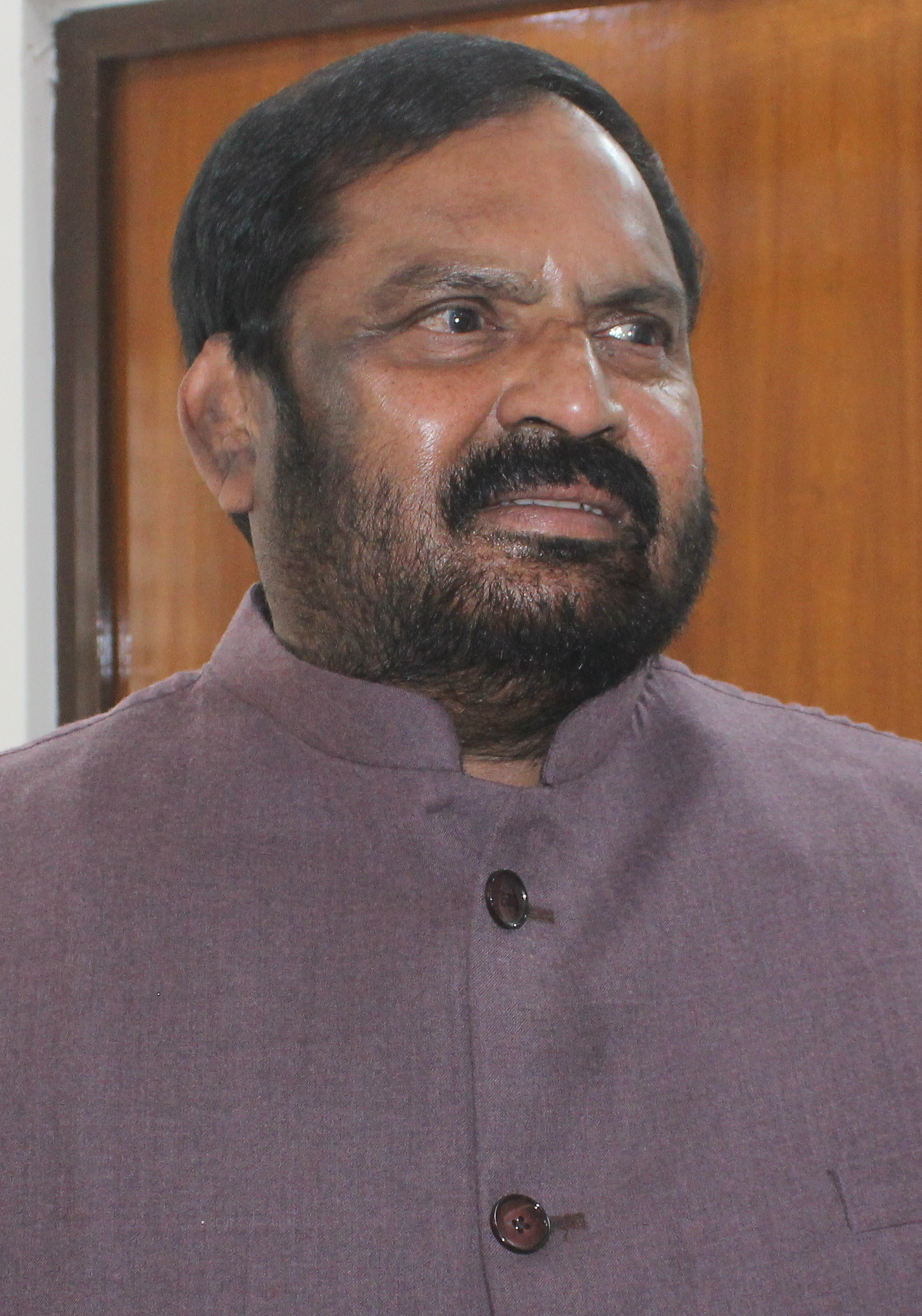

Working President of Telangana Pradesh Congress Committee
- In office from 7 July 2021
- National President Indian National Congress: Sonia Gandhi; Mallikarjun Kharge

Member of parliament, Lok Sabha
- In office 2004–2014
- Preceded by: Bandaru Dattatreya
- Succeeded by: Bandaru Dattatreya
- Constituency: Secunderabad

Personal details
- Born: 5 May 1961 (age 65) Hyderabad, Andhra Pradesh, India (now in Telangana)
- Party: INC
- Spouse: M. Nagamani Yadav
- Children: 2 sons and 2 daughters
- As of 26 September, 2006

M. Anjan Kumar Yadav (born 5 May 1961) is an Indian politician served as Working President of Telangana Pradesh Congress Committee. He was an MP of Lok Sabha of India. He represented the Secunderabad constituency of Telangana and is a member of the Indian National Congress (INC) political party. He lost the 2014 elections to BJP candidate Bandaru Dattatreya from Secunderabad.

Anjan Kumar Yadav served as Hyderabad City Congress party president in 2018.

== Electoral history ==
Year	Constituency	Party	Votes	Opponent		Result	Margin
2004	Secunderabad	INC	358,450	TDP	Bandaru Dattatreya	Won	68,758
2009	Secunderabad	INC	398,395	BJP	Bandaru Dattatreya	Won	17,675
2014	Secunderabad	INC	183,536	BJP	Bandaru Dattatreya	Lost	-254,735
2019	Secunderabad	INC	173,229	BJP	G. Kishan Reddy	Lost	-211,551
2023	Musheerabad	INC	37,410	BRS	Muta Gopal	Lost	-37,797

Preceded by Bandaru Dattatraya	Member of Parliament from Secunderabad; 2004–2014	Succeeded by Bandaru Dattatreya
