= Maha Kutami (2009) =

Indian electoral coalition

- Leader: N. Chandrababu Naidu; K. Chandrasekhar Rao; B. V. Raghavulu; K. Naryana
- Founded: 21 January 2009
- Dissolved: June 2009
- Ideology: Secularism; Communism; Populism
- Political position: Centre to far-left
- National affiliation: Third Front (National)
- Colours: Yellow
- Lok Sabha: 8 / 42 (2009)
- Andhra Pradesh Legislative Assembly: 107 / 294 (2009)

The Maha Kutami (Mahā Kūṭami; Telugu: మహా కూటమి, lit. 'Grand Alliance') was an alliance formed ahead of the 2009 Andhra Pradesh Legislative Assembly and general elections. It was formed on 21 January 2009 by four political parties — the Telugu Desam Party, the Telangana Rashtra Samithi, the Communist Party of India (Marxist) and the Communist Party of India. It was formed with the sole aim of dethroning the then-Indian National Congress government in the state, which was led by then-chief minister Y. S. Rajasekhara Reddy.

== Background ==
After the 2008 Lok Sabha vote of confidence, the Left Front withdrew support to the Congress in the state as well. Telugu Desam Party (TDP) and TRS then joined the Left as part of the national Third Front. In Andhra Pradesh, this alliance called themselves the Maha Kutami or "Grand Alliance" against what they called the "corrupt Congress" and "communal BJP".

== Infighting and defeat ==
The alliance was marked by major infighting among its constituent parties, primarily due to frictions in seat-sharing between them. There was mutual distrust and disarray among the member parties, which caused them to lose votes to the Congress and the Praja Rajyam Party (PRP). Notably, seat-sharing disagreements in the alliance were finalised barely 48 hours before the deadline for nominations. The alliance was described by India Today as "a loose grouping of super-sized egos and prime ministerial ambitions with no ideological common ground." The anti-incumbency votes were also divided between the TDP and the PRP, which benefited the Congress and damaged the TDP. Votes from the TRS and the Communist parties failed to transfer to the TDP, which caused the alliance to lose many seats, especially in Telangana. The Telangana statehood issue also proved divisive for the alliance.

== Campaign ==
There was a noticeable change in the tone of the TDP chief Naidu during the elections. Naidu, who credited himself as the founder of Cyberabad (now HITEC City) and projected himself as a moderniser in the previous election, now raised the concerns of the poor, farmers and development of the countryside. The alliance with the TRS also forced the TDP to abandon its stance against Telangana statehood.

=== Endorsements ===
The All India Sunni Ulema Board endorsed the alliance.

== Manifesto ==
The manifesto was released on 3 April 2009.

- Ensure economic, health and food security to the common man and reduce economic disparities in society.
- Implementation of the Cash Transfer Scheme (CTS).
- Integrated health scheme for poor- and middle-class families.
- Free colour TV set to every "common man".
- Law to control political corruption; tribunal will be set up to enquire and evaluate the disproportionate income of politicians.
- Provision of ₹2,000 (₹5,100 in 2023) monthly cash to every family.
- The Telangana issue will be resolved.

== Constituent parties ==
Maha Kutami
Party	Flag	Symbol	Leader	Seats	Women	Seats Won	Vote Received	Vote %	Vote in Contested	Deposit
Telugu Desam Party			N. Chandrababu Naidu	218	21	90	1,15,05,477	27.36	36.50	5
Telangana Rashtra Samithi			K. Chandrashekar Rao	39	0	10	15,62,044	3.71	29.29	9
Communist Party of India (Marxist)			B. V. Raghavulu	13	0	1	5,55,519	1.32	29.91	1
Communist Party of India			K. Narayana	12	1	4	4,62,140	1.10	28.90	2
Friendly Contest between Alliance *				10	2	2	5,38,272	1.28	17.88	12
Alliance did not Contest **				2						
Total				294	24	107	1,46,23,452	34.77	33.57	29

=== Friendly Contest ===
Sl. No.	Parties Involved	#	Constituency Name
1	TDP and TRS	25	Peddapalle
2	TDP and TRS	39	Sangareddy
3	TDP and TRS	50	Maheshwaram
4	TDP and TRS	77	Makthal
5	TDP and CPI(M)	40	Patancheru
6	TDP and CPI(M)	64	Karwan
7	TDP and CPI(M)	99	Ghanpur Station (SC)
8	TRS and CPI	32	Husnabad
9	TRS and CPI(M)	106	Warangal East
10	CPI and CPI(M)	206	Mangalagiri
11	Alliance did not contest	68	Yakutpura
12	Alliance did not contest	232	Kanigiri

== See also ==
- Praja Kutami (2018)
- Kutami (2024)
