= P. V. Rajeshwar Rao =

Indian politician

Member of Parliament, Lok Sabha
- In office 1996–1998
- Preceded by: Bandaru Dattatreya
- Succeeded by: Bandaru Dattatreya
- Constituency: Secunderabad

Personal details
- Born: Pamulaparthi Venkata Rajeshwar Rao; 14 August 1946 Vangara, Hyderabad State, British India
- Died: 12 December 2016 (aged 70) Hyderabad, Telangana, India
- Party: Indian National Congress
- Parent: P. V. Narasimha Rao (father)
- Relatives: Surabhi Vani Devi (sister)
- Education: Vivekvardhani College and Law College
- Occupation: Lawyer, politician

Pamulaparthi Venkata Rajeshwar Rao (14 August 1946 − 12 December 2016) was an Indian politician. He was a member of parliament, and represented Secunderabad, Andhra Pradesh in the Lok Sabha, as a member of the Indian National Congress.

He was son of former Prime Minister of India, P. V. Narasimha Rao.

== Personal life ==
Rao was born in Vangara village in Karimnagar district, Hyderabad state to P. V. Narasimha Rao and his wife Satyamma. He received his bachelor's and master's degrees from Osmania University. He had two brothers, P. V. Ranga Rao and P. V. Prabhakar Rao.
