= Nayani Narasimha Reddy =

Indian politician (1934–2020)

Nayini Narsimha Reddy

Minister of Home, Law, Prisons, Fire services, Sainik welfare, Labour and Employment Government of Telangana
- In office 2 June 2014 – 11 December 2018
- Governor: E. S. L. Narasimhan
- Chief Minister: K. Chandrashekar Rao
- Preceded by: Office Established
- Succeeded by: Mahmood Ali

Member of Legislative Council, Telangana
- In office 2 June 2014 - 1 June 2020
- Leader of the House: K. Chandrashekar Rao
- Constituency: Governor Nominated

Minister of Technical Education & Labour Government of Andhra Pradesh
- In office 2004–2008
- Governor: Surjit Singh Barnala; Sushilkumar Shinde; Rameshwar Thakur
- Chief Minister: Y. S. Rajasekhara Reddy

Member of Legislative Assembly Andhra Pradesh
- In office 2004 - 2008
- Preceded by: K. Laxman
- Succeeded by: T. Manemma
- Constituency: Musheerabad
- In office 1985 - 1989
- Preceded by: Sripathi Rajeshwar Rao
- Succeeded by: M. Konda Reddy
- Constituency: Musheerabad
- In office 1978 - 1983
- Preceded by: Tanguturi Anjaiah
- Succeeded by: Sripathi Rajeshwar Rao
- Constituency: Musheerabad

Personal details
- Born: 12 May 1934 Neredugommu, Hyderabad State, British India (present-day Telangana, India)
- Died: 22 October 2020 (aged 86) Hyderabad, Telangana, India
- Party: Telangana Rashtra Samithi
- Spouse: Nayini Ahalya Reddy
- Education: HSC (12th at present)

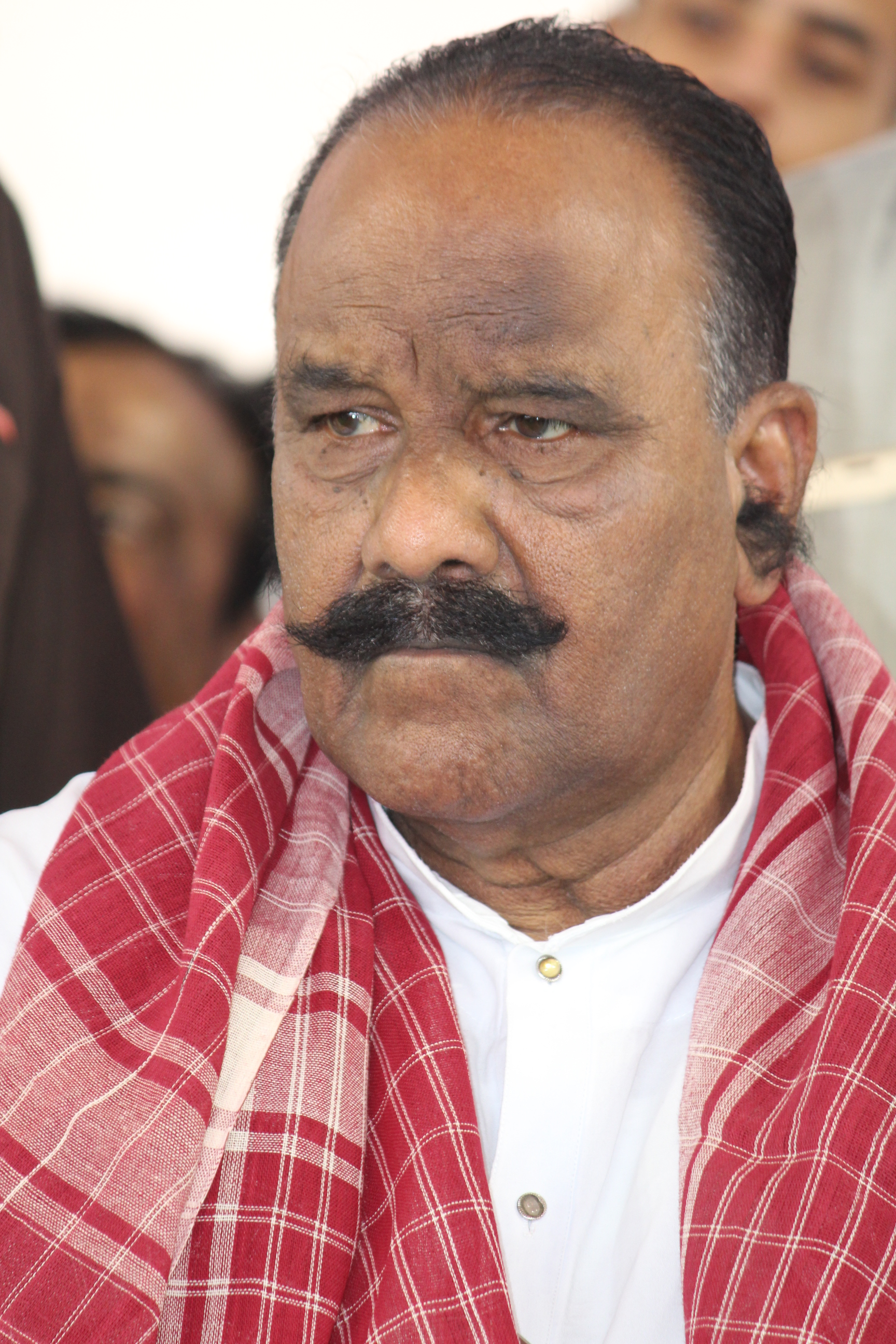
Nayini Narsimha Reddy in Alai Balai program

Nayini Narsimha Reddy (12 May 1934 – 22 October 2020) was an Indian politician. He served as the first Home Minister of Telangana from 2014 to 2018. He also took charge of portfolios including Prisons, Fire Services, Sainik Welfare, Labour and Employment. He was the Member of Legislative Council (MLC) of Telangana. He was the Senior Labour Leader in Telangana. A senior leader of the Telangana Rashtra Samithi (TRS), Reddy fought alongside K. Chandrashekar Rao for the statehood of Telangana.

== Early life and education ==
Reddy was born and grew up in Neredugommu village of Devarakonda, Nalgonda district to a farmer couple, Devaiah Reddy and Subadhramma. He was educated up to HSC. He mainly took active role in 1969 Telangana Agitation and started his political career from Janata Party.

== Career ==
He was first a labor union leader in VST industries. He took to active politics in Hyderabad as he had migrated to Hyderabad in the 1970s. He took active role in Telangana movement in 1969. He won three times as MLA from Musheerabad Constituency in Hyderabad. He was a Cabinet Minister of Technical Education in Y. S. Rajasekhara Reddy's Cabinet from 2004 to 2008 in Government of Andhra Pradesh. He was the leader to form Telangana and took part in an active role with KCR and Senior Leader from TRS Party.

He joined Telangana Rashtra Samithi after K. Chandrashekhar Rao launched the party in 2001 and has been one of the key leaders in the movement. He became the first Home Minister in the newly formed state of Telangana in K. Chandrashekhar Rao's cabinet. He was Member of Legislative Council (MLC) from Governor Quota. He was the Advisor for VST Labour Union Industries.

== Death ==
In October 2020, Reddy was hospitalized with symptoms of COVID-19 during the COVID-19 pandemic in India. He tested positive for the disease on 28 September 2020; his wife (who was hospitalized), eldest son and son-in-law also tested positive. On 9 October, he tested negative, but his condition continued to deteriorate owing to lung infection and post-COVID complications, according to a statement from Apollo Hospitals. He died from extensive lung damage on 22 October 2020, at 12:25 AM at the age of 86.

Political offices
Preceded by Position Established	Home Ministry of Home Telangana; 2014–2018	Succeeded by Mohammad Mahmood Ali
