= Ramnagar, Hyderabad =

Ramnagar
- Neighbourhood
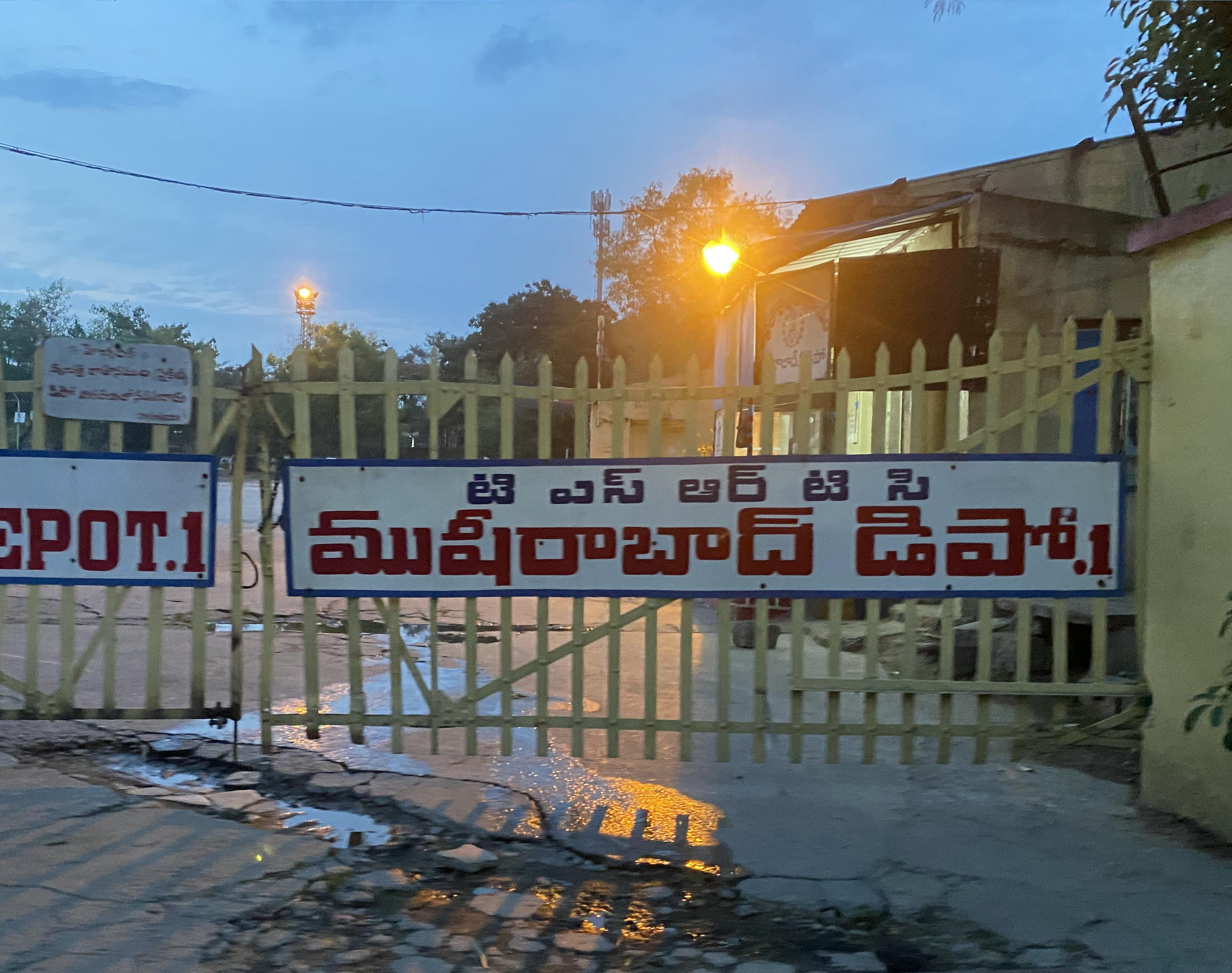
- TSRTC Musheerabad Depot 1 at Ramnagar
- Interactive map of Ramnagar
- Coordinates: 17°24′39″N 78°30′26″E
- Country: India
- State: Telangana
- District: Hyderabad
- Metro: Hyderabad

Government
  - Body: GHMC

Languages
  - Official: Telugu
- Time zone: UTC+5:30 (IST)
- PIN: 500 020
- Vehicle registration: TG
- Lok Sabha constituency: Secunderabad Lok Sabha constituency
- Vidhan Sabha constituency: Musheerabad Assembly constituency
- Planning agency: GHMC
- Website: telangana.gov.in

Ramnagar is one of the central part in Hyderabad, India. Ramnagar comes under the constituency of Musheerabad.

It is mainly a residential area which was once located very near to industries like VST (Vazeer Sultan Tobacco, Golkunda Cigarette factory and Charminar Cigarette factory which comprisingly is called Azamabad Industrial area).

== Transport ==
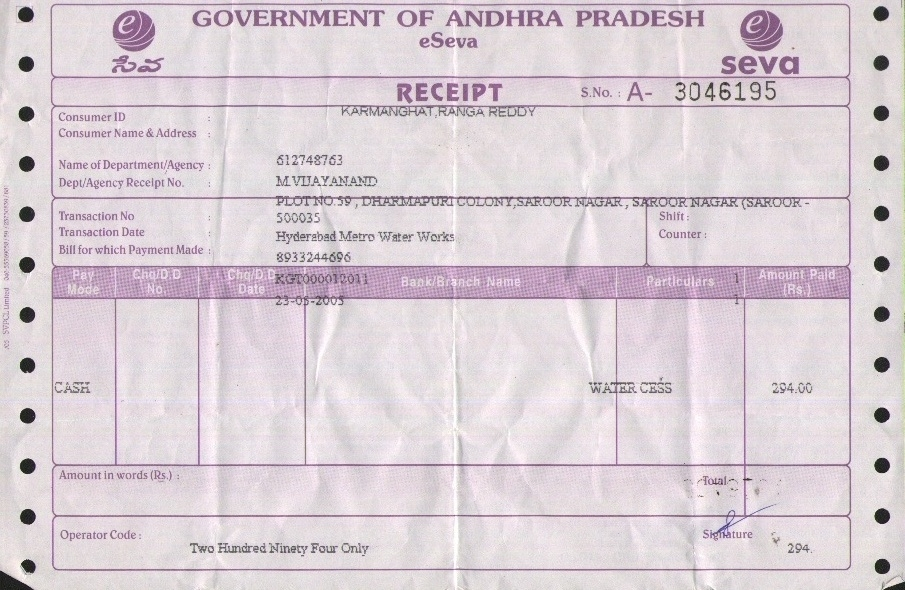
A Sample E-Seva Payment Receipt issued an E-Seva centre in Hyderabad.

The TGSRTC (Telangana State Road Transport Corporation) it has bus depot, hence buses transport to all parts of the city.

The closest MMTS Train station is at Jamia Osmania. Famous St.Pious 'X' Girls High School from past 50 years, several others schools like Mothers high school, Luna high school, Holy trinity etc. are located at Ramnagar. Sowmya Hospital is the only hospital here.
