= Kavadiguda =

- Neighbourhood
- Location in Hyderabad, India Kavadiguda (India)
- Coordinates: 17.431°N 78.510°E
- Country: India
- State: Telangana
- District: Hyderabad
- Metro: Hyderabad

Government
  - Body: Greater Hyderabad Municipal Corporation

Languages
  - Official: Telugu, Urdu
- Time zone: UTC+5:30 (IST)
- PIN: 500 080
- Vehicle registration: TG
- Lok Sabha constituency: Secunderabad
- Vidhan Sabha constituency: Musheerabad
- Planning agency: Greater Hyderabad Municipal Corporation
- Website: telangana.gov.in

Kavadiguda is a residential urban sprawl of Secunderabad, India.

== Transport ==
Kavadiguda is well connected by TSRTC buses to all parts of the city. The closest MMTS Train station is James Street.
