= Parsigutta =

- Neighbourhood
- Location in Hyderabad, India Parsigutta (India)
- Coordinates: 17.4292°N 78.4953°E
- Country: India
- State: Telangana
- District: Hyderabad
- Metro: Hyderabad

Languages
  - Official: Telugu
- Time zone: UTC+5:30 (IST)
- Vehicle registration: TG
- Lok Sabha constituency: Secunderabad Lok Sabha constituency
- Planning agency: GHMC
- Website: telangana.gov.in

Parsigutta is an area in Secunderabad, Telangana, India. It is famous for residential houses and temples. It comes under Boudhanagar Municipal Division and Secunderabad Assembly and Lok Sabha Constituency.

It comprises New Ashok Nagar, Sanjeevapuram, L.N. Nagar, Amber Nagar, Alladi and Rajkumar Nagar.

== Culture ==
The neighbourhood is a mixed culture of religions including Hindus, Muslims, Christians and Parsis after whom the locality is named. Ganesh Chaturthi and Navaratri festivals are grandly celebrated here by placing Ganesh and Maa Durga idols. Also Ramzan and Christmas festivals are celebrated

Annual Rangoli competitions are held in New Ashok Nagar for hundreds of participants, primarily women from the neighborhood and surrounding areas. The event takes place on the eve of Sankranthi (January 14) at the Community Hall near Pochamma Temple Lane, with prizes distributed on Republic Day (January 26).

Shirdi Sai Baba and Sri Anjaneya temple are famous temples in Parsigutta, situated near New MCH Colony Community hall. Every year in this temple Hanuman Jayanthi, Vinayaka Chavathi and Sri Rama Navami are celebrated and AnnaDanam is organized.

== Transport ==
Parsigutta is near to Secunderabad Railway Station and is surrounded by Padmarao nagar, Warsiguda, Ramnagar and Musheerabad. The largest fish market in the city is located near this area.

The area is well connected by road. TSRTC Bus No. 44 commutes from Secunderabad Rathifile bus stand to Parsigutta frequently. Also many private vehicles provide their services to commute.

== Development ==
This area is gradually developing. All main centres, such as hospitals and main bus stands, are nearby. Many professors from Osmania University are from Parsigutta.
