= T. Manemma =

Indian politician

Tangaturi Manemma

Member of Parliament, Lok Sabha
- In office 1987–1991
- Preceded by: Tanguturi Anjaiah
- Succeeded by: Bandaru Dattatreya
- Constituency: Secunderabad

Personal details
- Born: 29 April 1942 Hyderabad, Andhra Pradesh, India
- Died: 9 September 2018 (aged 76 years)
- Party: Indian National Congress
- Spouse: Tanguturi Anjaiah

Tangaturi Manemma (1942–2018) was an Indian National Congress politician from Andhra Pradesh. She was a member of the 8th and 9th Lok Sabha.

== Early life ==
Manemma was born on 29 April 1942 in Hyderabad to K. Shankar Reddy and completed her matriculation from Marwadi Hindi Vidyalaya, Chadar Ghat.

== Career ==
As the official candidate of the Indian National Congress (INC), Manemma received 1,82,861 votes and won the by-election conducted after the death of her husband in 1986. She represented Secunderabad in the 8th Lok Sabha and served on the Consultative Committee for Health and Family Welfare beside being a member of the House Committee.

During the 1989 Indian general election, Manemma retained her seat defeating Janata Dal's candidate by a margin of 1,47,601 votes. During her second term in the parliament she served on the Committee on Absence of Members from the Sittings of the House alongside the Consultative Committee for Health and Family Welfare. In 2009, she won the assembly election of Musheerabad.

== Personal life ==
In May 1960, Manemma married INC politician Tanguturi Anjaiah who later on went to become the Chief Minister of Andhra Pradesh. She had one son and four daughters from him. Mrs. Manemma died on 9 September at 11:30 am due to illness at Apollo Hospital, Jubilee Hills.
