= Muta Gopal =

Indian politician

Muta Gopal (born 10 February 1953) is an Indian politician from Telangana state. He is an MLA from Musheerabad Assembly constituency in Hyderabad district. He represents Bharat Rashtra Samithi and won the 2023 Telangana Legislative Assembly election.

== Early life and education ==
Gopal was born in Karimnagar to Muta Rajaiah and Muta Rajeswari. He is a graduate and runs his own business. He did his B.A. in 2005 at Vinayaka Missions University, Tamil Nadu. He married Saroja and they have a son and a daughter. He also served as a corporator and Zonal chairman of APSRTC and chairman of Andhra Pradesh Minimum Wages Board.

== Career ==
Gopal started his political career with Telugu Desam Party. He later shifted to TRS and was first elected as an MLA in 2018. He defeated Anil Kumar Yadav of Indian National Congress in the 2018 Telangana Legislative Assembly election by a huge margin of 36,910 votes. He retained the Musheerabad seat in the 2023 Telangana Legislative Assembly election representing Bharat Rashtra Samithi. He polled 75.207 votes and defeated his nearest rival, Anjan Kumar Yadav of Indian National Congress by a margin of 37,797 votes.
