= Secunderabad Lok Sabha constituency =

Constituency in Telangana, India

Coordinates: 17.44°N 78.50°E

Secunderabad TG-8
- Lok Sabha constituency
- Boundary of Secunderabad Constituency in Telangana

Constituency details
- Country: India
- Region: South India
- State: Telangana
- Assembly constituencies: Musheerabad; Amberpet; Khairatabad; Jubilee Hills; Sanathnagar; Nampally; Secunderabad
- Established: 1957
- Total electors: 1,893,647
- Reservation: None

Member of Parliament
- 18th Lok Sabha
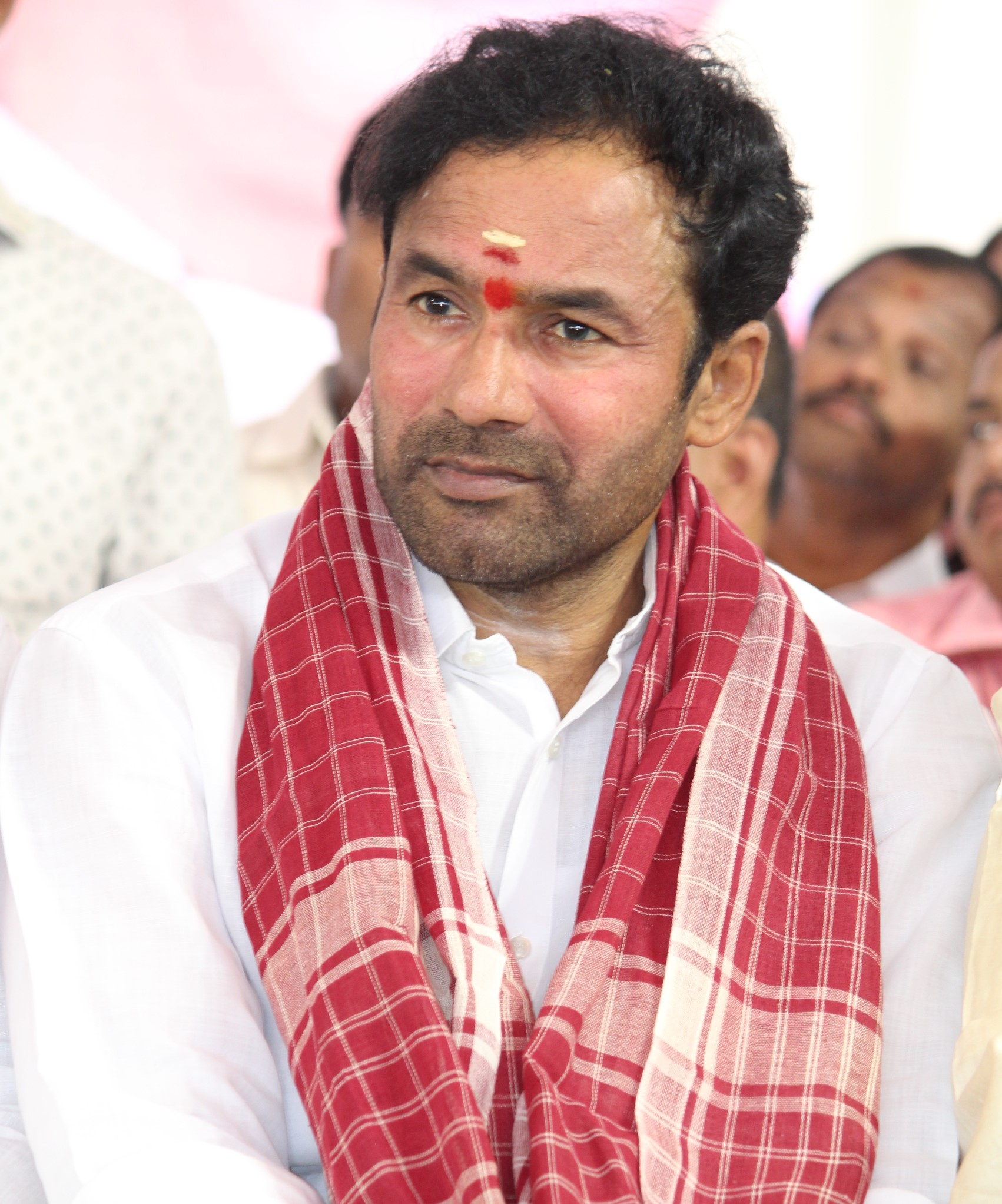
- Incumbent G. Kishan Reddy; Union Minister of Coal; Union Minister of Mines
- Party: Bharatiya Janata Party
- Elected year: 2024

Secunderabad Lok Sabha Constituency is one of the 543 Lok Sabha (Lower House of the Parliament) constituencies in Telangana in India.

== Assembly Segments ==
Secunderabad Lok Sabha constituency comprises the following Legislative Assembly segments:

No	Name	District	Member	Party	Leading (in 2024)
57	Musheerabad	Hyderabad	M. Gopal	BRS	BJP
59	Amberpet	Hyderabad	Kaleru Venkatesham	BRS	BJP
60	Khairatabad	Hyderabad	Danam Nagender	BRS	BJP
61	Jubilee Hills	Hyderabad	Valalla Naveen Yadav	INC	INC
62	Sanathnagar	Hyderabad	Talasani Srinivas Yadav	BRS	BJP
63	Nampally	Hyderabad	Mohammad Majid Hussain	AIMIM	INC
70	Secunderabad	Hyderabad	T. Padma Rao Goud	BRS	BJP

=== Secunderabad Lok Sabha constituency delimitation history ===
Following Assembly constituencies were included in Secunderabad constituency during delimitation every time.

S.No	Delimitation implemented year	Assembly constituencies included
1	1957	Musheerabad, Secunderabad, Secunderabad Cantonment, Jublee hills, Shahabad.
2	1962	Musheerabad, Secunderabad, Secunderabad Cantonment, Hyderabad East, Jubilee Hills, Medchal, Chevella.
3	1967	Musheerabad, Secunderabad, Secunderabad Cantonment, Khairatabad, Asifnagar, Gagan Mahal, Maharajganj.
4	1977	Musheerabad, Secunderabad, Sanathnagar, Khairatabad, Asifnagar, Himayatnagar, Maharajganj.
5	2009	Musheerabad, Secunderabad, Sanathnagar, Khairatabad, Amberpet, Jubilee Hills, Nampally.

== Members of Parliament ==
Year	Member	Party
Andhra Pradesh
1957	Narala Saikiran Mudiraj	Indian National Congress
1962	Narala Saikiran Mudiraj	Indian National Congress
1967	Narala Saikiran Mudiraj	Indian National Congress
1971	M. M. Hashim	Telangana Praja Samithi
1977	M. M. Hashim	Indian National Congress
1979^	P. Shiv Shankar	Indian National Congress
1980	P. Shiv Shankar	Indian National Congress
1984	Tanguturi Anjaiah	Indian National Congress
1987^	T. Manemma	Indian National Congress
1989	T. Manemma	Indian National Congress
1991	Bandaru Dattatreya	Bharatiya Janata Party
1996	P. V. Rajeshwar Rao	Indian National Congress
1998	Bandaru Dattatreya	Bharatiya Janata Party
1999	Bandaru Dattatreya	Bharatiya Janata Party
2004	M. Anjan Kumar Yadav	Indian National Congress
2009	M. Anjan Kumar Yadav	Indian National Congress
Telangana
2014	Bandaru Dattatreya	Bharatiya Janata Party
2019	G. Kishan Reddy	Bharatiya Janata Party
2024	G. Kishan Reddy	Bharatiya Janata Party

== Election Results ==
2024 Lok Sabha election : Secunderabad
Party	Candidate	Votes	%	±%
BJP	G. Kishan Reddy	473,012	45.15%	▲3.10
INC	Danam Nagender	4,23,068	40.38%	▲21.45
BRS	T. Padma Rao Goud	1,29,586	12.37%	▼22.89
NOTA	None of the above	5,166	0.49%	▼0.50
Margin of victory		49,944	4.77%	▼2.02
Turnout		10,47,659	49.04%	▲2.54
Total valid votes		10,47,659		
BJP gain from BJP		Swing	▲3.10	

=== Election 2019 ===
2019 Lok Sabha election : Secunderabad
Party	Candidate	Votes	%	±%
BJP	G. Kishan Reddy	384,780	42.05%	▼1.61
BRS	Talasani Sai Kiran Yadav	3,22,666	35.26%	▲20.93
INC	M. Anjan Kumar Yadav	1,73,229	18.93%	▲0.65
JSP	N. Shankar Goud	9,683	1.06%	New
NOTA	None of the Above	9,038	0.99%	▲0.34
Margin of victory		62,114	6.79%	▼18.56
Turnout		9,15,263	46.50%	▼6.51
Total valid votes		9,15,263		
BJP hold		Swing	▼1.61	

=== Election 2014 ===
2014 Lok Sabha election : Secunderabad
Party	Candidate	Votes	%	±%
BJP	Bandaru Dattatreya	438,271	43.66%	▲23.96
INC	M. Anjan Kumar Yadav	1,83,536	18.28%	▼21.09
AIMIM	Narla Mohan Rao	1,45,120	14.44%	New
BRS	T. Bheemsen	1,43,847	14.33%	▲10.50
YSRCP	Syed Sajid Ali	45,187	4.50%	New
NOTA	None of the Above	6,572	0.65%	New
Margin of victory		2,54,735	25.35%	▲5.68
Turnout		10,03,769	53.01%	▼1.92
Total valid votes		10,03,769		
BJP gain from INC		Swing	▲4.25	

=== Election 2009 ===
2009 Lok Sabha election : Secunderabad
Party	Candidate	Votes	%	±%
INC	M. Anjan Kumar Yadav	340,549	39.37%	▼10.53
BJP	Bandaru Dattatreya	1,70,382	19.70%	▼23.14
TDP	Srinivasa Sudhish Rambhotla	1,35,604	15.68%	New
PRP	Dr. Dasoju Sravan Kumar	91,414	10.57%	New
LSP	C. V. L. Narasimha Rao	52,641	6.09%	New
Margin of victory		1,70,167	19.67%	▲12.61
Turnout		8,65,038	54.93%	▲2.64
Total valid votes		8,65,038		
INC gain from INC		Swing	▲6.31	

=== Election 2004 ===
2004 Lok Sabha election : Secunderabad
Party	Candidate	Votes	%	±%
INC	M. Anjan Kumar Yadav	485,710	49.90%	▲7.77
BJP	Bandaru Dattatreya	4,16,952	42.84%	▼9.35
AIMIM	Humera Aziz	38,394	3.94%	New
BSP	M D Paul Vedanth	7,816	0.80%	New
Margin of victory		68,758	7.06%	▼17.12
Turnout		9,73,288	52.29%	▼2.56
Total valid votes		9,73,288		
INC gain from BJP		Swing	▲7.77	

=== Election 1999 ===
1999 Lok Sabha election : Secunderabad
Party	Candidate	Votes	%	±%
BJP	Bandaru Dattatreya	498,110	52.19%	▲3.49
INC	P. Shiv Shankar	4,01,175	42.13%	▼0.15
AIADMK	B. S. Rao	20,490	2.15%	New
Margin of victory		96,935	10.06%	▲3.64
Turnout		9,54,342	54.85%	▲3.39
Total valid votes		9,54,342		
BJP gain from BJP		Swing	▲1.82	

=== Election 1998 ===
1998 Lok Sabha election : Secunderabad
Party	Candidate	Votes	%	±%
BJP	Bandaru Dattatreya	441,741	48.70%	▲12.44
INC	P. V. Rajeshwar Rao	3,83,158	42.28%	▲11.75
JD	Alladi Rajkumar	66,220	7.30%	▼18.53
Margin of victory		58,583	6.42%	▲0.69
Turnout		9,06,975	51.46%	▲5.38
Total valid votes		9,06,975		
BJP gain from INC		Swing	▲0.35	

=== Election 1996 ===
1996 Lok Sabha election : Secunderabad
Party	Candidate	Votes	%	±%
INC	P. V. Rajeshwar Rao	233,391	30.53%	▼10.42
BJP	Bandaru Dattatreya	2,27,007	29.70%	▼20.67
JD	C. Narayana Reddy	1,97,422	25.83%	New
Margin of victory		6,384	0.83%	▼18.59
Turnout		7,64,375	46.08%	▲5.76
Total valid votes		7,64,375		
INC gain from BJP		Swing	▲5.13	

=== Election 1991 ===
1991 Lok Sabha election : Secunderabad
Party	Candidate	Votes	%	±%
BJP	Bandaru Dattatreya	321,114	50.37%	▲27.00
INC	T. Manemma	1,97,143	30.95%	▼18.06
TDP	Tanguturi Anjaiah	1,02,891	16.14%	▼8.31
Margin of victory		1,23,971	19.42%	▲6.22
Turnout		6,37,508	40.32%	▼11.51
Total valid votes		6,37,508		
BJP gain from INC		Swing	▲22.53	

=== Election 1989 ===
1989 Lok Sabha election : Secunderabad
Party	Candidate	Votes	%	±%
INC	T. Manemma	369,838	49.01%	▼8.09
BJP	Bandaru Dattatreya	1,76,374	23.37%	▲19.33
TDP	N. T. Rama Rao	1,84,554	24.45%	New
Margin of victory		1,85,284	24.56%	▼0.14
Turnout		7,54,611	51.83%	▲0.12
Total valid votes		7,54,611		
INC gain from INC		Swing	▼4.05	

=== Election 1984 ===
1984 Lok Sabha election : Secunderabad
Party	Candidate	Votes	%	±%
INC	Tanguturi Anjaiah	261,604	57.10%	▲2.23
BJP	Bandaru Dattatreya	1,48,591	32.43%	New
Margin of victory		1,13,013	24.67%	▼0.07
Turnout		4,58,150	51.71%	▲2.81
Total valid votes		4,58,150		
INC gain from INC		Swing	▲1.15	

=== Election 1980 ===
1980 Lok Sabha election : Secunderabad
Party	Candidate	Votes	%	±%
INC(I)	P. Shiv Shankar	205,257	54.87%	▲1.25
JP	G. Venkatswamy	1,12,698	30.13%	▼13.91
INC(U)	M. M. Hashim	38,102	10.18%	New
Margin of victory		92,559	24.74%	▲15.16
Turnout		3,74,082	48.90%	▼8.54
Total valid votes		3,74,082		
INC(I) gain from INC		Swing	▲7.58	

=== Election 1977 ===
1977 Lok Sabha election : Secunderabad
Party	Candidate	Votes	%	±%
INC	M. M. Hashim	188,862	53.62%	▼14.33
JP	S. B. Giri	1,55,108	44.04%	New
Margin of victory		33,754	9.58%	▼32.22
Turnout		3,52,223	57.44%	▲16.54
Total valid votes		3,52,223		
INC gain from TPS		Swing	▼7.16	

=== Election 1971 ===
1971 Lok Sabha election : Secunderabad
Party	Candidate	Votes	%	±%
TPS	M. M. Hashim	117,043	67.95%	New
INC	K. V. Ranga Reddy	45,116	26.19%	▼20.65
SSP	B. S. Mahadev Singh	5,102	2.96%	▼17.15
Margin of victory		71,927	41.76%	▲15.03
Turnout		1,72,248	40.90%	▼12.44
Total valid votes		1,72,248		
TPS gain from INC		Swing	▲44.30	

=== Election 1967 ===
1967 Lok Sabha election : Secunderabad
Party	Candidate	Votes	%	±%
INC	Bakar Ali Mirza	102,342	46.84%	▼6.83
SSP	B. S. Mahadev Singh	43,939	20.11%	New
ABJS	V. R. Rao	38,710	17.72%	▲8.92
Margin of victory		58,403	26.73%	▲1.32
Turnout		2,18,502	53.34%	▲3.34
Total valid votes		2,18,502		
INC gain from INC		Swing	▼3.41	

=== Election 1962 ===
1962 Lok Sabha election : Secunderabad
Party	Candidate	Votes	%	±%
INC	Ahmed Mohiuddin	99,286	53.67%	▼13.02
Independent	S. B. Giri	52,279	28.26%	New
ABJS	A. V. K. Murthy	16,280	8.80%	New
Margin of victory		47,007	25.41%	▼7.97
Turnout		1,84,982	50.00%	▲6.92
Total valid votes		1,84,982		
INC gain from INC		Swing	▼6.51	

=== Election 1957 ===
1957 Lok Sabha election : Secunderabad
Party	Candidate	Votes	%	±%
INC	Ahmed Mohiuddin	98,203	66.69%	New
PSP	S. B. Giri	49,055	33.31%	New
Margin of victory		49,148	33.38%	New
Turnout		1,47,258	43.08%	New
Total valid votes		1,47,258		
INC gain from INC		Swing	New	

== See also ==
- Secunderabad
- List of constituencies of the Lok Sabha
