= Osmania Medical College =

Medical college in Telangana, Hyderabad, India

Coordinates: 17°22′55.73″N 78°29′4.37″E

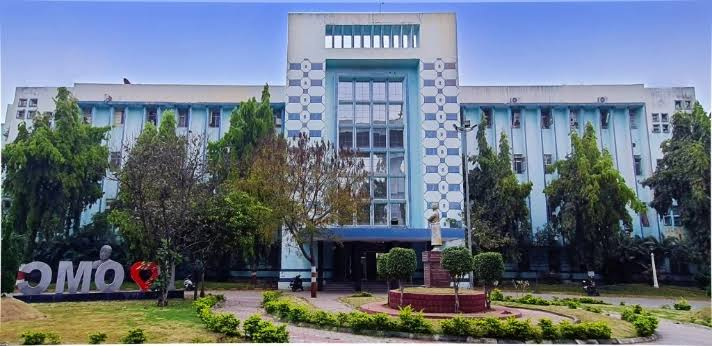
- Former name: The Hyderabad Medical School
- Motto: Sincerity - Service - Sacrifice
- Type: Government Institution
- Established: 1846; 180 years ago
- Affiliations: Kaloji Narayana Rao University of Health Sciences, NMC
- Principal: Dr. M. Raja Rao
- Location: Koti, Hyderabad, Telangana, India
- Campus: Urban
- Website: omc.ac.in

Osmania Medical College is a Government Medical College in Hyderabad, Telangana, India. It was founded in 1846 by the 5th Nizam of Hyderabad and Berar, Afzal ud Dowla, Asaf Jah V. The college was originally affiliated to Osmania University system, now it is affiliated to the Kaloji Narayana Rao University of Health Sciences, and the Osmania General Hospital. It is ranked 48th among the medical schools in India in 2025 by the N.I.R.F., and also an ISO Certified Institute.

== History ==
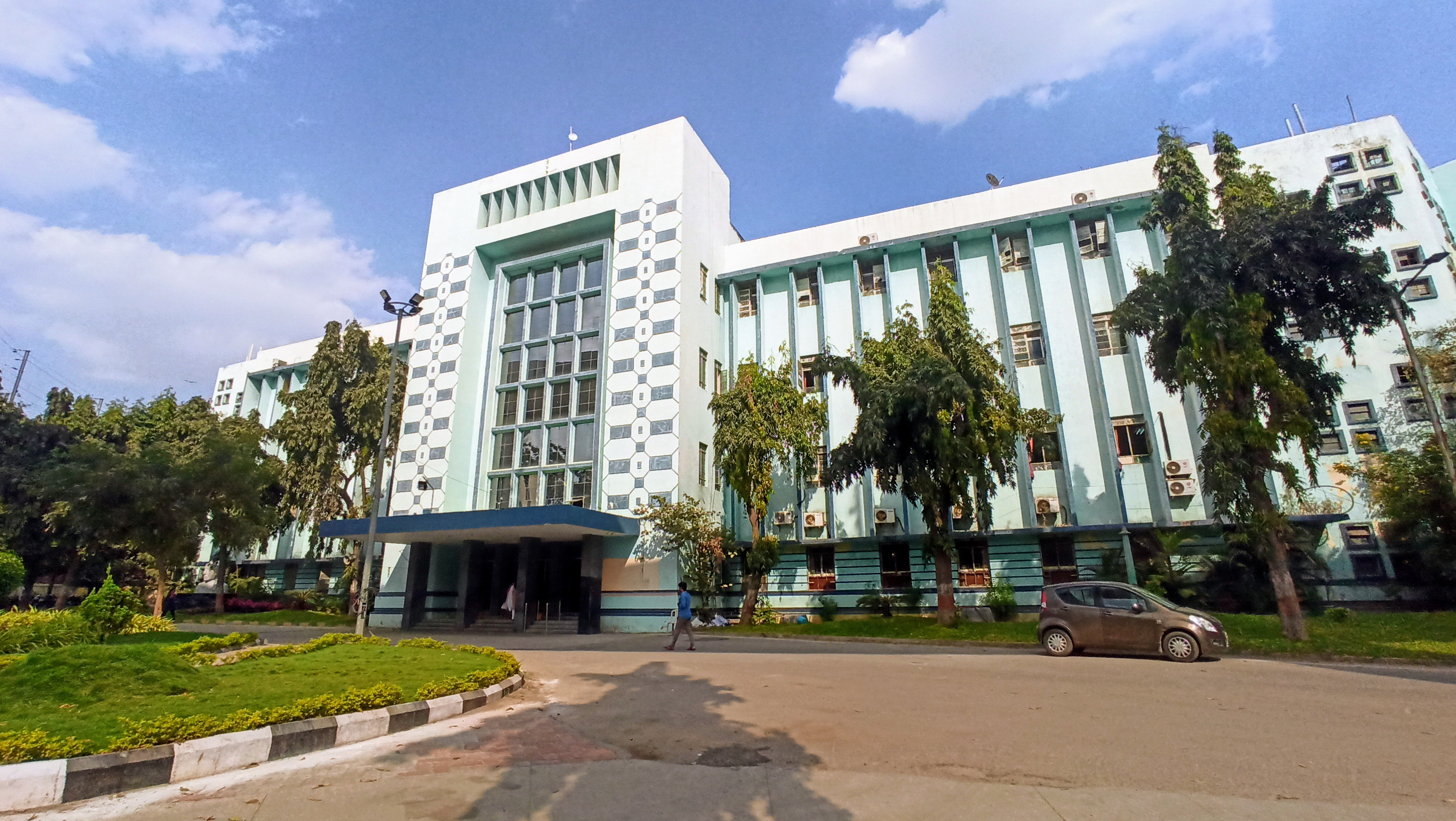
View of the college in 2020

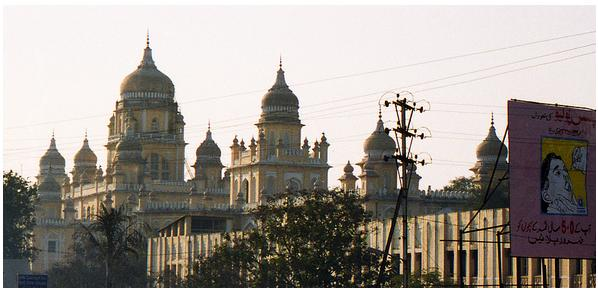
Osmania General Hospital Hyderabad

The college was established in 1846 and named the Hyderabad Medical School, during the reign of the 5th Nizam of Hyderabad - Afzal ad-Dawlah, Asaf Jah V. When the Nizam became ill, probably from diabetes, the then British resident suggested he be treated with Western medicine by William Campbell Maclean.The Nizam recovered fully. Impressed with allopathic medicine, he ordered the establishment of the Hyderabad Medical School (which later became Osmania Medical College) in 1847, headed by Maclean.

Edward Lawrie, then principal of Hyderabad Medical School, performed a series of experiments at the Afzal Gunj Hospital (now Osmania General Hospital) on anaesthesia (Hyderabad Chloroform Commission). Rupa Bai Furdoonji, said to be the world's first qualified female anesthesiologist, graduated from the college in 1889.

After the establishment of the Osmania University in 1919, the school was renamed Osmania Medical College, after the seventh Nizam of Hyderabad, Mir Osman Ali Khan.

== Academic Details & Courses Offered ==
- Bachelor of Medicine and Surgery (MBBS) - UG (250 students per year are admitted to study for MBBS degree)
- Doctor of Medicine/Master of Surgery (MD/MS) - PG
- Doctor of Medicine (DM) /MCh - SS
- Bachelor of Science (BSc) courses in Nursing, Paramedical and Medical specialities - UG

== Departments ==
Pre & Para Clinical Departments

1. Anatomy
2. Physiology
3. Biochemistry
4. Microbiology
5. Pathology
6. Pharmacology
7. Community medicine
8. Forensic Medicine

Clinical Departments

1. Anaesthesiology
2. Cardiology
3. Endocrinology
4. ENT
5. Ophthalmology
6. General Surgery
7. Internal Medicine / General Medicine
8. Nephrology
9. Orthopedics
10. Paediatrics & Neonatology
11. Radiology
12. Urology
13. Obstretics & Gynaecology
14. Neurology
15. Psychiatry
16. Dermatology

== Affiliated Specialty Training Hospitals ==
- Osmania General Hospital, Afzalgunj
- Niloufer Hospital for Woman and Children, Lakdikapul
- Sir Ronald Ross Institute of Tropical and Communicable Diseases, Nallakunta
- Sarojini Devi Eye Hospital
- Government ENT Hospital
- Institute of Mental Health, Erragadda
- TB and Chest Hospital, Erragadda
- Government Maternity Hospital, Sultan Bazar
- Modern Government Maternity Hospital, Petlaburz
- MNJ Institute of Oncology Regional Cancer Hospital, Lakdikapul

== Conferences ==
OSMECON is the chief Medical Conference (UG) hosted by OMC and its associated hospitals. It is a 3-day event that sees participation of nearly 2,000 delegates across 17 states of the country as well as from 5 other countries, yet expanding its outreach.

== Notable alumni ==
- Rupa Bai Furdoonji, anesthesiologist
- Undurti Narasimha Das, immunologist, Shanti Swarup Bhatnagar laureate
- Manjula Anagani, gynecologist
- Boora Narsaiah Goud, Member of Parliament
- Chelikani Venkata Rama Rao, communist leader and parliamentarian
- P. Shankar Rao, former MLA
- J. Geeta Reddy, MLA
- K. Srinath Reddy, president of the Public Health Foundation of India
- Mandadi Prabhakar Reddy, Telugu character actor
- Nagam Janardhan Reddy, former MLA, Nagar Kurnool
- Tejaswini Manogna, Model (Miss Earth India 2019)
- Maryam Afifa Ansari, Indian neurosurgeon
- Satish SC Rao, Gastroenterologist, Distinguished University Chair in Gastroenterology, Medical College Georgia, USA
- Chandra Sekhar Pemmasani, Member of Parliament for Guntur, Founder and CEO of UWorld (USMLEWorld LLC)

== See also ==
- Osmania General Hospital
- Niloufer Hospital
- Government ENT Hospital
- Sarojini Devi Eye Hospital
- Fever Hospital
