= Sanathnagar =

- neighbourhood
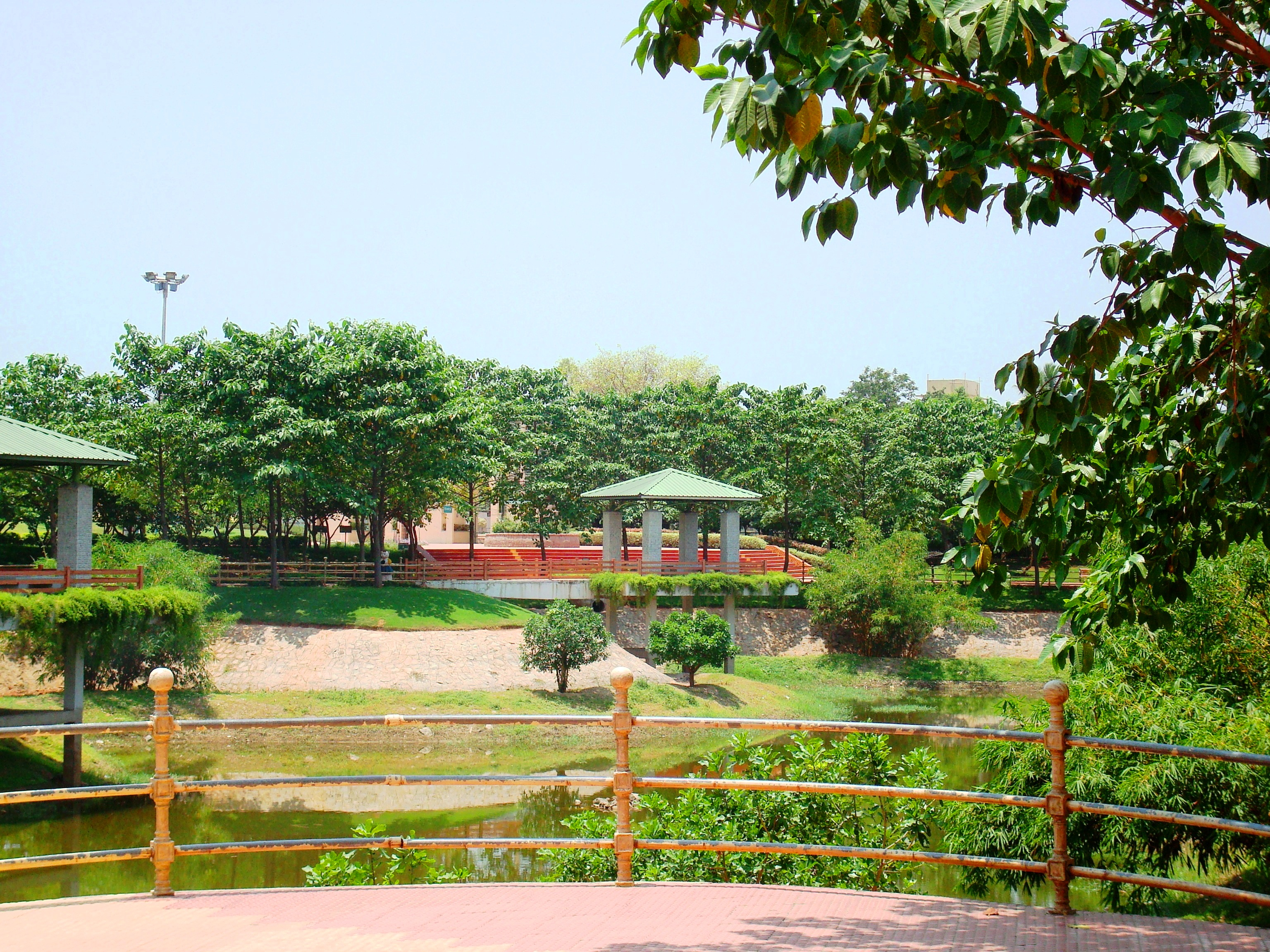
- Kanjerla Laxminarayana Yadav Park

- Location in Telangana, India Sanathnagar (Telangana) Sanathnagar (India)
- Coordinates: 17°29′N 78°25′E
- Country: India
- State: Telangana
- District: Hyderabad
- Metro: Hyderabad
- Established: 1941
- Founder: City Improvement Board

Government
  - Body: GHMC

Languages
  - Official: Telugu & Urdu
- Time zone: UTC+5:30 (IST)
- PIN: 500018
- Vehicle registration: TG
- Lok Sabha constituency: Secunderabad Lok Sabha constituency
- Vidhan Sabha constituency: Sanathnagar Assembly constituency
- Planning agency: GHMC
- Civic agency: GHMC
- Website: telangana.gov.in

Sanathnagar is an industrial and residential neighbourhood in Hyderabad City, Telangana, India, and one of the most densely populated neighbourhoods in India. The industrial area of Sanathnagar was established by City Improvement Board in 1941

In the past, a part of it served as a residential area for officers and workers in the industries located there. The residential area is known as SRT (Single Room Tenements) quarters. It has since grown to include neighbouring localities such as Czech Colony, parts of BK Guda, Subhash Nagar Colony, Tulisi Nagar, Jayaprakash Nagar Colony, and the ESI area.

== Story ==
The industrial area of Sanathnagar includes small and medium-scale chemical, pharmaceutical, electrical, and mechanical industries. It also has large industries like Bright Star Rubber, Divi's, Sipra, Gland Pharma, and Lamco along with several major automobile service centres. GM Motors, TATA Motors, Toyota, Chevrolet, Daewoo, Bajaj, Volvo, Škoda, Mercedes-Benz are located here. The main branch of the post office is also located in this industrial area.

The engineering companies Voltas and Allwyn were formerly located in Sanathnagar, along with automobile manufacturer Ashok Leyland and asbestos sheets manufacturer like Hyderabad Industries Ltd.

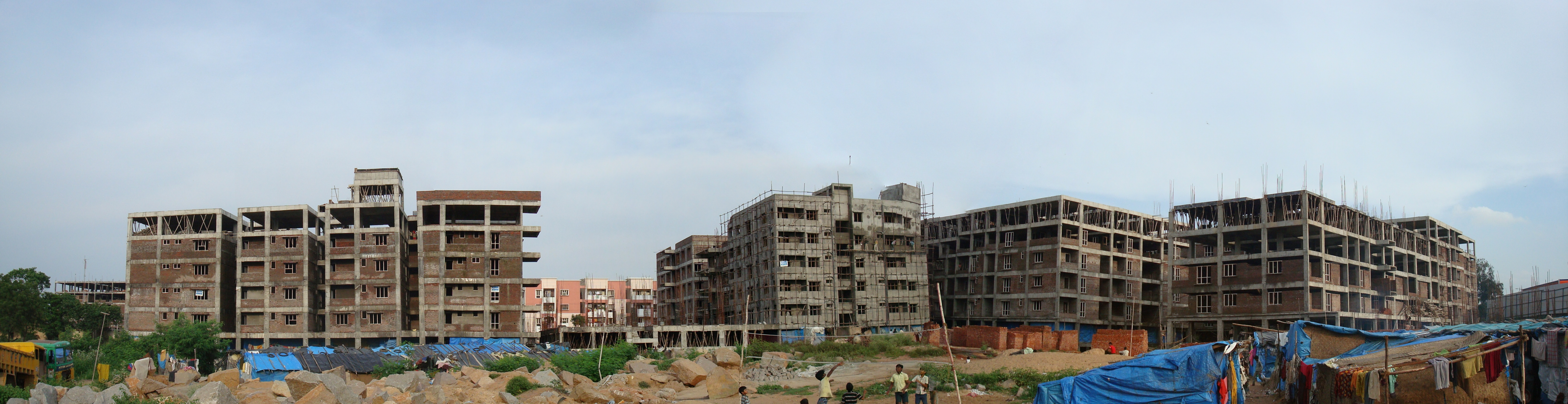
A real estate boom has taken over the once peaceful Czech colony.

Now with Bakelyte Hylam made a residential property, purchased and developed by Lodha Group, a gated community is coming up at Sanathnagar with the name CASA Paradiso. Swamy Talkies, an old cinema theater, has also been converted into a apartments. Major national banks such as the State Bank of India, HDFC, State Bank of Hyderabad, Andhra Bank and big retail stores like D-Mart, Agro Mech Industries, Metalika Industries & Steel Utensils manufacturing unit, Metal Industries are also located here. Urbanisation can be seen in areas like the Czech colony and others of this suburb.

The Sunday Market located at Sanathnagar-Erragadda main road sells all kinds of second-hand goods and many other miscellaneous items.

== Education ==
The early schools set up in this area include Covells High School, the first school established in 1964-2021. It was followed in 1965 by St. Theresa's Girls High School. Hindu Public School is the largest school in Sanathnagar. Blue diamond high school1980. Other schools located in this suburb are the Rose Buds High School, Neena High School (established in 1984), Crescent Convent High School (established in 1996), Vasistha Vidyalaya, Vidyanjali High School, Rainbow School, Gautami Vidya Dhamam, Jai Bharati School and the Little Scholars School. The Hindu college for women is a prominent college in the suburb.

== Healthcare ==
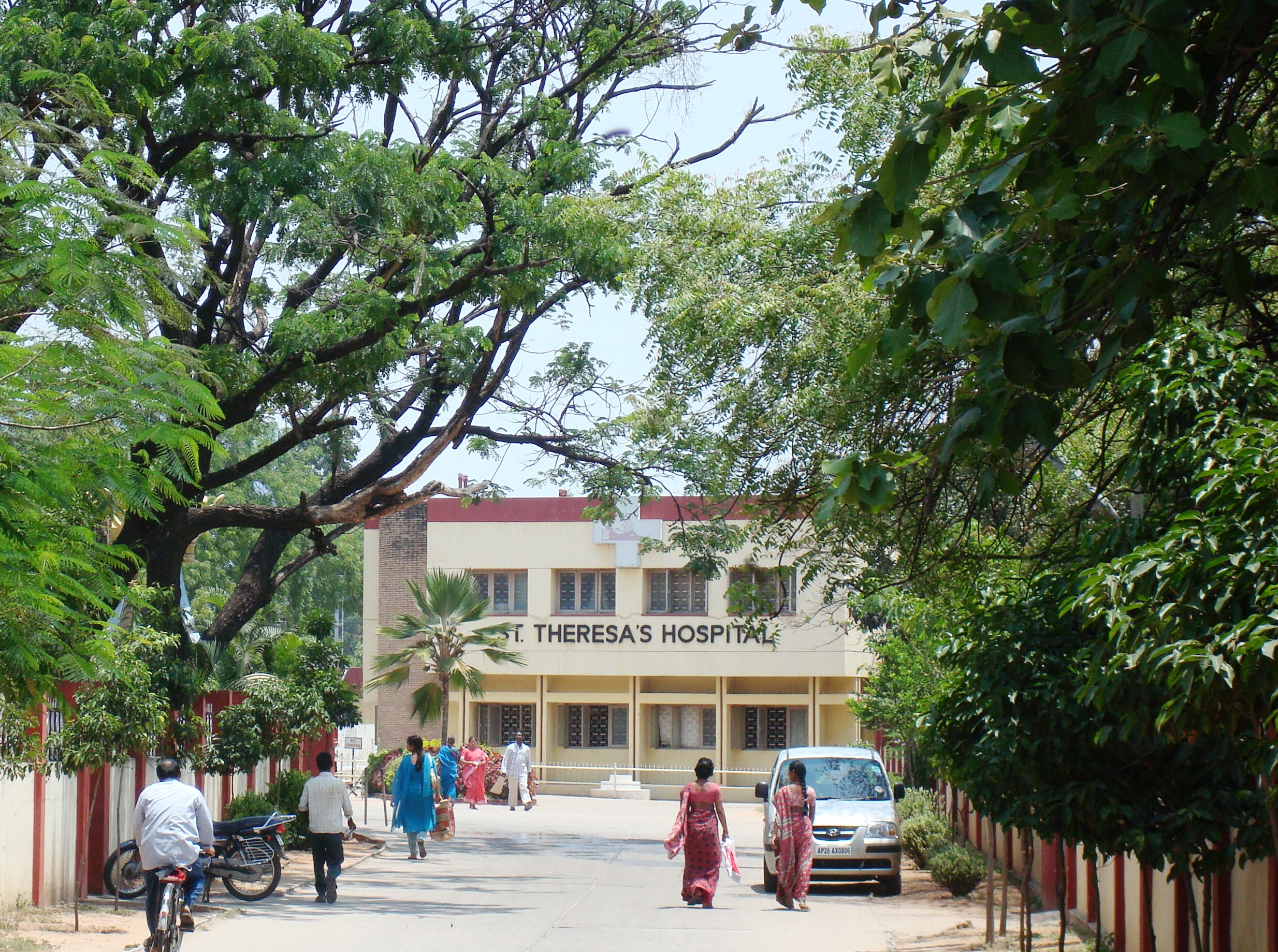
St. Theresa's Hospital, one of the earliest hospitals in the area

St. Theresa's Hospital is one of the oldest hospitals in the area. This hospital has recently undergone renovations to accommodate more wards. The government owned ESI hospital is also present here. A chest hospital, a TB hospital, and a hospital for mental health are among the other government institutions located near the suburb, providing health care for the poor.

== Culture ==
The citizens of this area are generally peaceful, and come from different backgrounds and a variety of religions.

The Hanuman temple at Czech colony is one of the famous sites of Hinduism. Bhadrakali mata temple near Sanathnagar bus stop is one and only Kali Mata temple in Sanathnagar and surrounding areas. Christianity was brought to this area by the Salesian missionaries. Churches in the area include St. Theresa's Church, Baptist Church, and St. Paul's Church at Czech Colony.

The Masjid close to the bus depot is a well-known one called Jafri Masjid. Apart from this there are few other Masjids such as Masjid-e-Quba and Masjid-e-Ibrahimia. The Eid gah near the Jafri Masjid is also well-known where Eid Namaz are being offered.

== Recreation ==
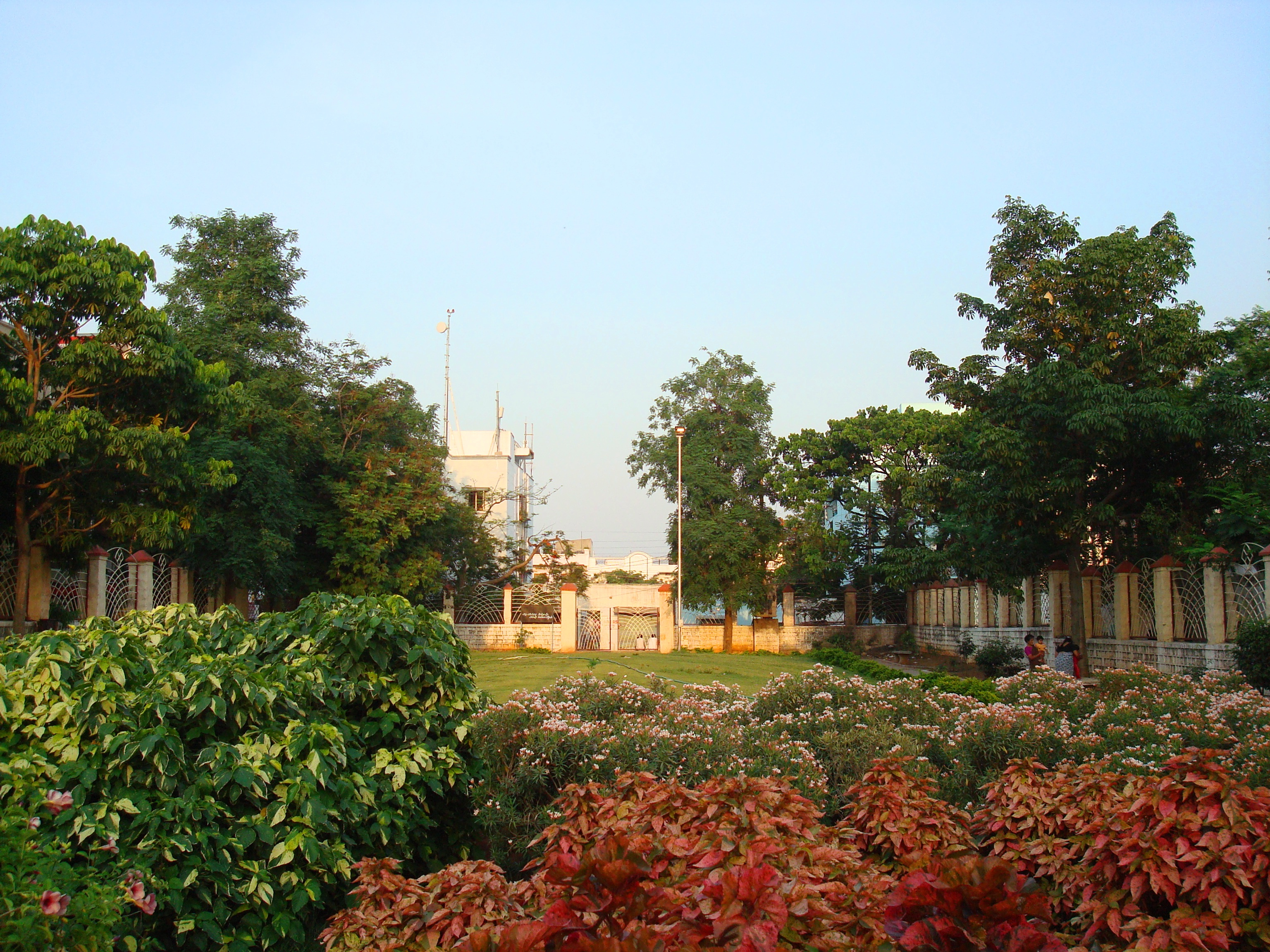
One of Sanathnagar's many municipal parks

Sanathnagar is known for its parks in its suburbs, open spaces such as the Welfare Ground, Milad Ground, Vinayak Ground, Bhagat Singh park, Veer Savarkar Park and Nehru Ground, and the Sanathnagar-Fathenagar-Balkampet Flyover.

Welfare Ground was one of the biggest open fields for playing cricket. This ground looks like a small cricket stadium. In summer this is occupied with about 300-400 people playing cricket daily. Now it also includes a swimming centre.

== Transit ==
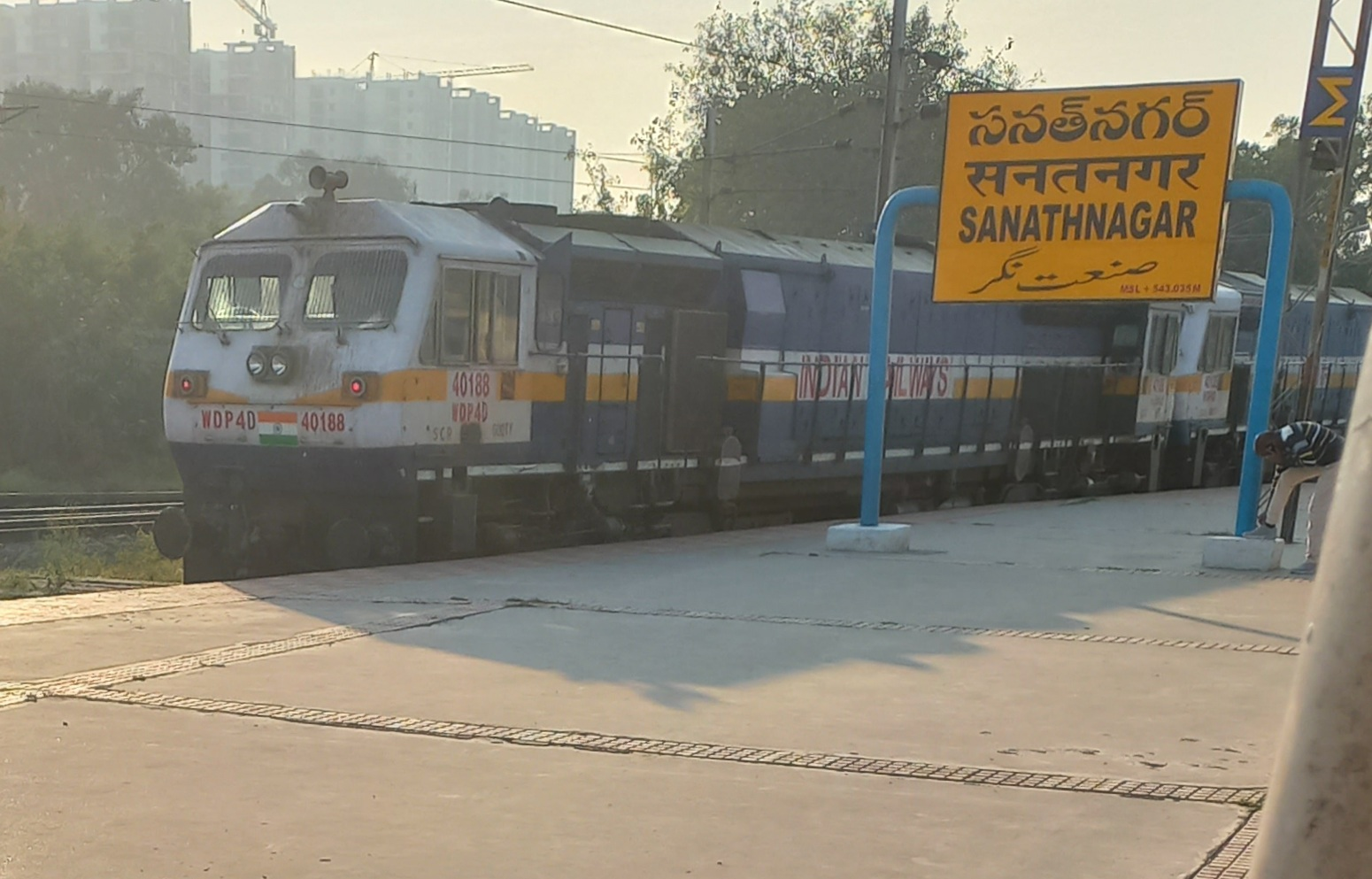
Platform No. 2 of at Sanathnagar railway station

Sanathnagar has a TSRTC bus terminal, linking it to all the major suburbs of Hyderabad and Secunderabad, along with a MMTS station providing local rail connectivity to parts of Hyderabad. Metro Rail is also accessible from Erragadda.

== Neighbourhoods ==
Sanathnagar consists of several other smaller localities such as Fathenagar, BK Guda, Ravindra Nagar Colony, part of Sanjiva Reddy Nagar, Czech Colony, Subhash Nagar Colony, Jayaprakash Nagar Colony, and ESI (Hospital and Quarters). The TRS Government has sanctioned a new RUB connecting Sanathnagar with Balanagar through the Industrial estate road from Toyota showroom leading to SBI Industrial estate branch which will be a 4-lane 100 feet wide road passing under the Sanathnagar railway yard. Also a new 2-lane flyover has been sanctioned which will run parallel to the existing Balkampet - Fatehnagar ROB.

== Politics ==
The Sanathnagar constituency is currently represented in the Telangana Legislative Assembly by Talasani Srinivas Yadav and 101 Constituency Corporator Konalu Laxmi Reddy

== Business ==
Sanathnagar has all the necessary stores ranging from book stores to medical stores. It is one of the largest markets for retail fire works and there are approximately 100 stores during Diwali season.
