= List of Indian medical colleges before Independence =

Medical education in India has seen significant growth over the years. , leading to increased attention from various sources on the history and development of medical institutions in the country. Among the topics of interest is the recognition of the oldest surviving medical colleges in India, which have played a pivotal role in shaping the healthcare landscape of India. These institutions, many of which were established during the colonial period, have been instrumental in setting the foundations for medical education and training in India. Their enduring legacy continues to be a subject of study and discussion, reflecting their historical and educational importance in the broader context of India's evolving medical education system

== Pre-colonial India ==
India has a long and well-documented history of medical education, with institutional practices dating back several centuries. In Hyderabad, formal medical instruction can be traced to 1595, when Muhammad Quli Qutb Shah established the Darush-Shifa (House of Cure), a general hospital with an attached medical school where the Unani system of medicine was taught and practiced; the structure still stands on the southern bank of the Musi River, near the Salar Jung Museum. This article, however, focuses specifically on the oldest continuously operating medical schools in India that were established prior to the country’s independence in 1947.

== Colonial India ==
During the 16th century, the introduction of Western medicine into India was spearheaded by the Portuguese. The year 1600 marked a significant milestone with the arrival of medical officers accompanying the inaugural fleet of ships dispatched by the East India Company. Their presence facilitated the inception of Western medical practices within the Indian subcontinent. Initially, medical departments were established, complete with surgeons, to cater to the healthcare needs of the troops and staff affiliated with the East India Company. A pivotal development occurred in 1775 when hospital boards were established, consisting of the Surgeon General and Physician General. These boards were primarily constituted by personnel under the command of the British Indian Army in each presidency. Subsequently, medical departments were established in the Bengal presidency, Madras presidency, and Bombay presidency in 1785. These departments assumed responsibility for the healthcare of both military personnel and British civilians residing in India.

== List ==
College Name	Location	Established	Remarks
Goa Medical College	Bambolim, Goa	1691	Due to its status as a Portuguese colony, this educational institution in Goa commenced its journey as a medicine class instructed by a Portuguese physician Manoel Roiz de Sousa. The establishment of a formal medical training institution commenced in November 1842.
L'Ecole de Médecine de Pondichéry	Pondicherry	1823	Established by French-India, this institution holds the distinction of being India's first medical college. Following the transfer of authority from French India to the Indian government in 1956, it was rebranded as Dhanvantri Medical College. Subsequently, in 1964, it was rechristened as the Jawaharlal Institute of Postgraduate Medical Education and Research.
Medical College, Bengal	88 College Street, Kolkata	1835, January	Established by Lord William Bentinck, this institution's students assumed a pivotal role in India's struggle for independence. Presently, it is commonly referred to as Calcutta Medical College.
Madras Medical College	Chennai, Tamil Nadu	1835, February	The college was inaugurated with the purpose of providing medical education to the personnel of the Madras Government General Hospital which is recognized as the first Western medicine hospital of India established in 1664. Presently, the college maintains affiliation with Tamil Nadu Dr. M.G.R. Medical University.
Grant Medical College	Mumbai	1845	In 1834, Robert Grant, serving as the Governor of Bombay, spearheaded efforts to establish a medical school in the region. A notable Indian-Parsi philanthropist, Jamsetjee Jejeebhoy, contributed 100 thousand rupees towards the construction of this medical institution. Presently recognized as Grant Government Medical College, it is affiliated with the Sir J.J. Group of Hospitals for clinical training.
Hyderabad Medical School	Hyderabad	1846	It was established following the illness of Nawab Nasir-ud-Dawlah, who failed to recover under traditional Unani treatment. Upon the recommendation of British Resident Mr. Fraser, the Residency surgeon William Campbell Maclean successfully treated the Nizam through dietary regulation, leading to increased confidence in Western medicine. This prompted the founding of the institution, which was later renamed Osmania Medical College after the establishment of Osmania University in 1919 under Mir Osman Ali Khan.
Thomson School of Medicine	Agra	1854	The institution was named after Lieutenant Governor Sir James Thomson, who founded the school and laid its foundation stone in 1854. It was originally established with the primary objective of training medical assistants and doctors to serve in the Indian Army. In 1947, the college was renamed to Sarojini Naidu Medical College in honor of Sarojini Naidu — the first female Governor of Uttar Pradesh.
Glancy Medical College	Amritsar	1864	Glancy Medical College was originally established in 1864 in Lahore, then part of British India. It was named in honor of Sir Bertrand James Glancy, who was the Governor of the region at the time. In 1920, the institution was relocated to Amritsar, India. It was upgraded to the status of a medical college in 1943. The institution is presently known as the Government Medical College, Amritsar.
Sealdah Medical School	Sealdah, Kolkata	1873	Also known as Campbell Medical College, this institution was established by the British to combat rising epidemics. Commencing with a small hospital in 1864, following independence, it was renamed in tribute to a freedom fighter and alumnus of the college, becoming Nil Ratan Sircar Medical College and Hospital.
King Edward Medical School	Indore	1878	The institution was originally established in 1878 as a medical school under the name King Edward Medical School, alongside the first allopathic dispensary in central India. In July 1948, it was upgraded and renamed Mahatma Gandhi Memorial Medical College.
Calcutta School of Medicine	Belgachia, Kolkata	1886	The institution began as the Calcutta School of Medicine in 1886. It was renamed Belgachia Medical College in 1916 and became Carmichael Medical College in 1918. In 1948, it adopted its current name, R. G. Kar Medical College, in honor of Dr. Radha Gobinda Kar.
Berry White Medical School	Dibrugarh, Assam	1901	The college was founded as Berry White Medical School in 1901 by Sir John Berry White. It was renamed Assam Medical College and Hospital on 3 November 1947.
Lady Hardinge Medical College	Connaught Place, New Delhi	1916	Originally named Queen Mary College & Hospital in 1914, the institution was founded by Lady Hardinge to promote medical education for Indian women. Following her death in 1914, it was renamed Lady Hardinge Medical College in 1916, honoring her pivotal role in its establishment and perpetuating her legacy as its founder.

== See also ==
- List of medical colleges in India
