= Rupa Bai Furdoonji =

World's first female anesthetist, from Hyderabad, India

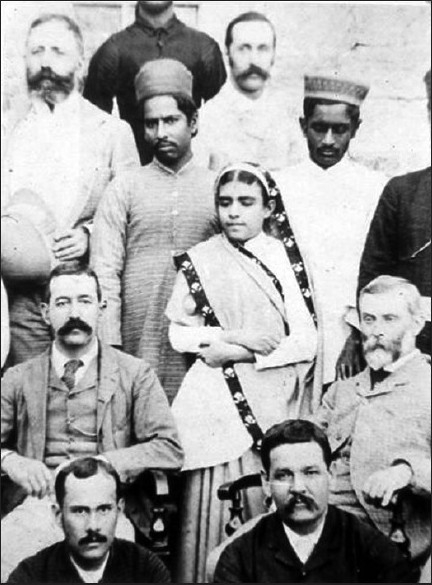
- Rupa Bai Firdounji along with Sir Thomas Lauder Brunton sitting on her left
- Born: Hyderabad, India
- Died: Hyderabad, India
- Occupation: Anesthetist

Rupa Bai Furdoonji (also Firdounji or Faridounji) was an Indian Parsi doctor who was the world's first female anesthetist. She practiced medicine in Hyderabad, and played a major role in introducing the use of chloroform as an anesthetic in India.

== Life and career ==
In 1885, Furdoonji began her studies and was one of five women to enroll in medical courses at Hyderabad Medical College. In 1889, she obtained a degree of Hakeem, equivalent to that of a Medical Doctor. Subsequently, she pursued a medical degree from Johns Hopkins Hospital, Baltimore. In 1909, with the encouragement from Annie Besant, Furdoonji went to Edinburgh, Scotland, to gain more experience and knowledge in anesthetics. There, she obtained diplomas in Physics and Chemistry from the University of Edinburgh since no specialized course emphasized anesthetics. She chose to study Physics and Chemistry because the knowledge of these subjects was found useful for the doctors who handled anesthetics.

Furdoonji was an influential voice at the First and Second Hyderabad Chloroform Commissions held in 1888 and 1891, respectively. From 1889 to 1917, she had administered anaesthesia in the British residency hospital (present Sultan Bazaar hospital), Afzalgunz Hospital (present Osmania General Hospital) and Victoria Zenana Maternity Hospital, Hyderabad. In 1920, she retired as the superintendent of Chaderghat Hospital, Hyderabad.
