= OSMECON =

OSMECON is an undergraduate medical conference hosted annually by Osmania Medical College and its associated hospitals in Hyderabad, India.

OSMECON is a three-day event, typically scheduled in August each year. Started in 2010 as a platform for medical undergraduates to present their research, the conference's oeuvre has since expanded to include numerous workshops, clinical case discussions, quizzes, guest lectures, panel discussions and symposia, with international delegates in attendance since 2014.

One of the main goals of OSMECON in recent years has been to equip participants with current clinical skills as well as an understanding of basic and clinical research techniques. Another main focus has been the recent developments, future opportunities and challenges that medical research presents at all levels of training, with particular emphasis on the Indian context.

== OSMECON-2010 ==
- OSMECON started in 2010 as a one-day event restricted to the state. The event was first organised by the then final year students Sai Prasad Narsingam, Mohammed Imaduddin and Rubina Ansari.
- Dr. C. Raghu, Interventional Cardiologist and Director – Prime Hospitals, Hyderabad graced OSMECON as the Chief guest.
- It was a single day event with case, paper and poster presentation as the main events with 40 delegates.

== OSMECON-2011 ==
The conference reached out to other medical colleges in erstwhile Andhra Pradesh. It was a two-day event conducted on the 25 and 26 of August 2011 with 100 delegates. The following were introduced for the first time.

- Poster presentation on Nanotechnology & Robotics in medicine
- MedQuiz on Antimicrobial resistance
- Seminar on Research Methodology-by Dr.VishnuVardan Rao, NIN, Hyderabad.

== OSMECON-2012 ==
Dr. B. Sesi Kiran, Former Director of NIN gave a lecture on Research Methodology and Dr. Sreekanth Vemula, Eminent Neurophysician, graced the event.

It was a 3-day event held from 31 August to 2 September with 400 delegates.

The highlight of the conference was the introduction of workshops for undergraduate medical students.

- Basic Life Support Skills,
- Basic Surgical Skills,
- Safe Shift of Trauma victim.

== OSMECON-2013 ==
- Bharat Ratna Dr. A.P.J. Abdul Kalam, Former President of India graced the conference and made it a historical memory for everyone.
- Dr. Arun Tiwari, DRDO Scientist, adjunct professor HCU and co-author of several books with Dr.Kalam also spoke about "Squaring the circle - 7 steps to Indian Renaissance".
- It was a 4-day event with the participation of over 700 delegates and had 3 workshops on: Basic Life Support Skills, Basic Surgical Skills, Obstetrics and Neonatology.

== OSMECON-2014 ==
Dr. Ch. Mohan Rao, Director CCMB & Dr.Kalpagam Polasa, former Director of NIN inaugurated the event and spoke of the research scenario in the country.

Dr. Gullapalli Nageswara Rao, Founder of LV Prasad Eye Hospital, delivered a guest lecture.

Theme of the conference: Mental Health Awareness

The Panel discussion anchored by Prof Pari Plavi remains one of the most popular events at Osmecon. Dr Mahender Vyasabattu, Director of Oslers Academy, Prof Manisha Sahai, MD. DM and DNB examiner, Dr Kanaka Durga, Scientist & Geneticist and Dr Mamidi, ICMR-B Scientist participated and shared their expertise.

There were 800 delegates with 7 from Nepal. The following events were introduced:

- MedTech
- Panel Discussion
- Medical Dumbcharades
- Medical Short films

== OSMECON-2015 ==
Padma Shri Dr. Kakarla Subba Rao, internationally renowned radiologist and Father of Radiology in India, inaugurated the event.

Padma Shri Dr. L.Narendranath, eminent Orthopaedic surgeon delivered a guest lecture on 'IT Solutions in Health Care'.

Theme of Poster Presentation : 3-D Printing in Medicine, Novel Drug Delivery Systems

It was a 3-day event with the participation of over 1,000 delegates and had 5 workshops on:

1) Basic Life Support Skills,

2) Basic Surgical Skills,

3) ECG Interpretation

4) Basic Medical imaging

5) Obstetrics & Neonatology,

6) Orthopaedic skills and Trauma Care.

== OSMECON-2016 ==
Padmashri Dr. A.Gopala Krishna Gokhale (Cardiothoracic Surgeon, First Minimal Access Heart Surgeon & First Heart-Kidney combined Transplant Surgeon) delivered the Inaugural Address.

Dr. G.V. Ramana Rao (Executive Partner, Head of Emergency Medicine Learning Centre (EMLC) and Research division at GVK-EMRI) was the Guest of Honour

Dr. G. Jagdishwar Goud, renowned Surgical Oncologist and Robotic Surgeon spoke about trends in Robotic Surgery.

Dr. M. Pari Plavi, distinguished alumna of Osmania Medical College, former Professor and Head of Department of Anatomy at Osmania Medical College, Founder-Convener of OSMECON, discussed the Neuroscience of Adolescence and Meditation.

Theme of Poster Presentation: Cancer Immunotherapy, Personalised Medicine

There were about 1,100 delegates attending from all over the country.

== OSMECON-2017 ==
Dr. K. Srinath Reddy, President of Public Health Foundation of India delivered the inaugural address.

Dr. Patanjali Dev Nayar, Regional Advisor, Disability & Injury Prevention, WHO SEARO delivered a lecture on "Manoeuvring crossroads to human sexuality".

Theme of the conference: Adolescent & Reproductive Health.

Over 1,400 delegates participated in the eighth edition, with over 120 international delegates, taking the event to a bigger stage. Two new workshops were introduced:

1) Chest Sounds Interpretation

2) Forensic Autopsy

== OSMECON-2018 ==
The 9th edition of OSMECON was held on August 10, 11 & 12 at Osmania Medical College, Hyderabad.

Padmashree Dr. Dasari Prasad Rao, former Director of Nizam Institute of Medical sciences, Hyderabad graced the event as the Chief guest.

Dr. Arvinder Singh Soin, reputed Hepato-Biliary surgeon(1st successful liver transplant in the country). He spoke about "Will AI in medicine make doctors redundant?".

The conference added 4 new workshops to its list.

- Arterial Blood Gas Analysis
- Interactive Genomics
- Soft Skills

== OSMECON-2019 ==
The 10th Edition of OSMECON was held in August 2019 from the 8th to the 10th.
The esteemed event was honoured by:

Dr. Sowmya Swaminathan(Ch. Scientist at the World Health Organisation WHO) was the honourable Chief Guest.

Padmashree Dr. Prakash Baba Amte and Dr. Mandakini Amte who shared the Ramon Magsaysay award both gave guest lectures.

Dr. Rakesh Mishra, CCMB Director.

Dr. Hemalatha, National Institute of Nutrition NIN Director.

Dr. Ravi Wankhedkar, National Resident of IMA, New Delhi also graced the event.

The Annual UG Conference was attended by nearly 2000 delegates from 7 states across the country as well as from 5 different countries, still expanding its reach even further. Few futuristic and technological areas of medical research were also presented during the symposiums 'Nanotechnology in cancer treatment' and '3D Bioprinting'.

== OSMECON 2021 ==
Dr. Devi Shetty, cardiac surgeon and chairman of Narayana Health, was the Chief Guest of the occasion. His efforts in making healthcare accessible and affordable through Narayana Health earned him the prestigious Padma Shri and Padma Bhushan awards.

Dr. Gandhi P.C. Kaza, Chairman of Truth Labs, India's independent non-profit Forensic Science laboratory, was the guest speaker at the event.

The theme of the conference, "Reprogramming the Code of Healthcare Education," revealed the need for innovation and transformation in medical learning.

OSMECON 2021 introduced "Colloquium," a virtual academic conference that preceded "Symposium." This academic event fostered discussions and solutions to common societal issues among participants.

Furthermore, a dedicated "Emergency and Trauma Care Workshop" was incorporated into the conference's list of workshops.

In response to the pandemic's challenges, OSMECON 2021 ingeniously blended both online and offline events, optimizing proceedings and ensuring widespread participation.

== OSMECON 2022 ==
The 12th edition of the event was inaugurated by none other than renowned Ophthalmologist, Dr. G.N Rao, founder of LV Prasad Eye Institute. Dr. Rao, in his rousing speech, talked about how the college is renowned for its academics and research and encouraged students to work together with their peers, follow time management to reach greater heights and excel in the profession.

The conference this year had 12 workshops, each giving a hands-on experience pertaining to different topics of medical importance.

The four active events, including the Case, Poster, Paper Presentation and the Medical Symposium witnessed participation from students around the country and beyond.

Nine events combining medical knowledge and creative activities were held for the delegates. The Medquiz, Dare to Diagnose, and Debate sessions received participation. Other events included Art Attack, Graphilia, Invictus, Shuttermedics, Spell Bee, and medical dumb charades.

All in all, this year's conference witnessed the participation of over 2100 delegates.

== OSMECON 2023 ==
The 13th edition of OSMECON was held on 29 and 30 September 2023 and 1 October 2023.

The guest of honor for the event was the Founder & Chairman of Asian Institute of Gastroenterology (AIG), Hyderabad, Dr D. Nageshwar Reddy.

The Guest Speaker for the year was Dr. Sairam Reddy Palicherla, Co-founder & Chief Scientist Officer at Urban Kissan & Director of Heartfulness Institute, India. His message was, "Let food be thy medicine - modern farming for new generation"

The conference had 12 workshops, 4 active events & 10 passive events.

This year, chest sounds in pulmonology and ECG in cardiology were the new additions to the workshops.

The 4 active events namely paper presentation, case presentation, poster presentation and medical symposium were outstanding.

Among the passive events, Medventure combined elements of creativity & medical knowledge. The event, a medical-themed treasure hunt was reintroduced this year after hiatus. Participants worked in teams to solve clues on campus grounds, in a format modelled on detective style investigation.

Wrapping it up, OSMECON 2023 hosted nearly 3000 delegates from all over the country and beyond.

== OSMECON-2024 ==
The 14th edition of OSMECON, the annual international undergraduate medical conference organized by Osmania Medical College, was inaugurated by cardiologist B. Somaraju, former chairman of Care Hospitals. In his address, he spoke on the importance of multidisciplinary approaches in medicine and their intersections with fields such as quantum physics, molecular biology, and genetics.

The guest lecture was delivered by A. V. Gurava Reddy, an orthopaedic surgeon, who contributed to the academic proceedings with insights from his field.

That year’s conference featured 13 workshops, including a newly introduced session titled Synergy in Diagnosis, which combined pathology and microbiology to strengthen clinical diagnostic reasoning.

The conference also hosted four active academic events: Case Presentation, Paper Presentation, Poster Presentation, and Medical Symposium. The Poster Presentation included themes such as Transhumans and the Iceberg Phenomenon.

In addition, there were 11 passive events designed to encourage creativity among medical students. These included competitions such as MedQuiz and Dare to Diagnose, along with cultural and artistic events like Graphila, Invictus, Art Attack, and Shuttermedics. A new event, Med Imposter, adapted the format of the online game Among Us to a medical context.

The 14th edition of OSMECON recorded the highest attendance in its history, with approximately 3,200 delegates participating.
