= Maryam Afifa Ansari =

Indian neurosurgeon

Maryam Afifa
- Born: 1993 (age 32–33); Hyderabad, India
- Education: MBBS, MS-General surgery, DNB-General surgery, MRCS(Ed), Mch- Neurosurgery, DrNB-Neurosurgery; Osmania Medical College
- Occupation: Neurosurgeon
- Known for: First female muslim neurosurgeon India
- Medical career
- Field: Surgery
- Sub-specialties: Neurosurgery

Maryam Afifa (born 1993, Hindi: मरियम अफीफा अंसारी, Urdu: مریم عفیفہ, Romanized: Maryam 'Afīfa) is an Indian neurosurgeon who is the first Muslim Female neurosurgeon from India.

== Education ==
She secured 137th rank in the All India Neet SS exam. She completed her MBBS from Osmania University, then pursued her post-graduation in General surgery from the same. She went on to train at the Royal College of Surgeons of England, and then passed the boards in India.
