= Sarojini Devi Eye Hospital =

Geography
- Location: Mehdipatnam, Hyderabad, Telangana, India
- Coordinates: 17.3988629°N 78.4436267°E

Organisation
- Type: Specialist

Services
- Beds: 500
- Speciality: Ophthalmology

History
- Opened: 1967; 59 years ago

Sarojini Devi Eye Hospital is a Regional Institute of Ophthalmology and Government Ophthalmic hospital, a medical institution in Hyderabad, Telangana, India. It is named after Sarojini Naidu, a child prodigy, Indian independence activist and poet (also known as The Nightingale of India). It is affiliated to Osmania Medical College and Gandhi Medical College and serves as a teaching hospital. Originally, it included an ENT section, but it was separated and moved to separate premises in Hyderabad. Located very near to Mehdipatnam, it is situated near the starting point of the P.V. Narasimha Rao Expressway.

In 2023, it was announced that the entire campus would be rebuilt to modern standards.

== History ==
It is the primary hospital for eye treatment for the poor and underprivileged in and around Hyderabad. It has been treating many patients for free since its inception. It is a 550-bed capacity tertiary care referral eye hospital catering to the states of Telangana and Andhra Pradesh and also neighboring states. It is a teaching hospital for Osmania Medical College and Gandhi Medical College, Hyderabad. 24 post graduates from Osmania Medical College and 5 post graduates from Gandhi Medical College undergo ophthalmology residency training programme.250 under graduates from Osmania Medical College and 200 from Gandhi Medical College undergo their ophthalmology clinical training. The institute has five sub specialties. Department of Orthoptics and squint was established in 1967, department of Retina in 1968 and department of Cornea in 1975. The specialties of glaucoma, and oculoplasty were added later. The institute has 9 clinical units headed by a Professor each. The faculty in addition has 6 Associate Professors and 33 Assistant Professors. Some of the faculty members have undergone fellowship training programme in the sub specialties The institute has “State of the Art” equipment and technology to treat diseases in general ophthalmology and specialities. It has attached laboratory with departments of Pathology, Microbiology and Bio-chemistry.

The hospital made news all over India and in the US in 1980, when doctors operated and removed the healthy eye from a 2-year-old girl, Nasreen Banu, instead of the cancerous one, blinding her for life. The incident created a furor in India resulting in the Government of India sending Nasreen Banu to the United States for treatment at its expense, where the other cancerous eye was operated and removed.

13 February is the birthday of Sarojini Naidu and the same is the foundation day of the hospital.
