= TB and Chest Hospital =

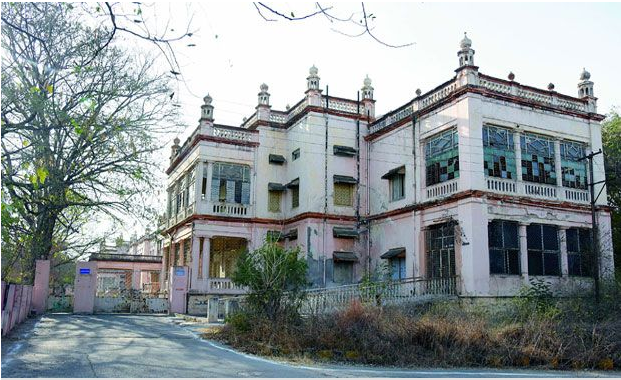
- Formerly known as The Irranuma Palace and now as Chest hospital

Geography
- Location: Hyderabad, India, India
- Coordinates: 17.445522°N 78.434988°E

Services
- Beds: 670

History
- Opened: after 1888

Links
- Lists: Hospitals in India

TB and Chest Hospital also known as Erragadda Chest Hospital is a tuberculosis hospital located in Hyderabad, India. The 670-bed hospital is located on 65 acres near Erragadda

== History ==
The Irranuma Palace, now the government Chest Hospital, was built during the time of the sixth Nizam by a noble, Nizamuddin Fakhrul Mulk in 1888 and abandoned it because of a superstition. The palace was donated to be converted into a hospital by the VII Nizam Mir Osman Ali Khan. Erramanzil belonged to the same family. Their tombs, Fakhrul Mulk, still exists at SR Nagar.
