= K. Srinath Reddy =

Indian cardiologist

Professor K. Srinath Reddy
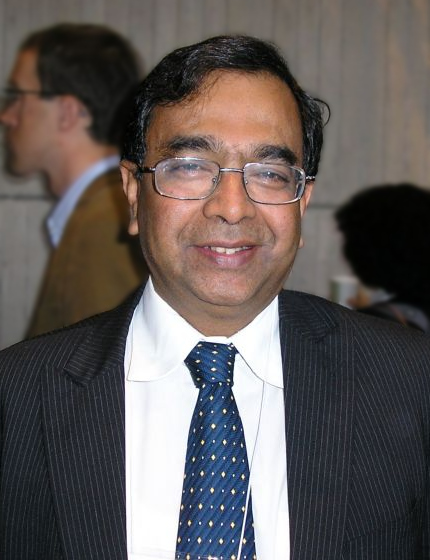
- Founder (Past) President, Public Health Foundation of India (PHFI) and formerly headed the Department of Cardiology at All India Institute of Medical Sciences (AIIMS).
- Other name: K. Srinath Reddy
- Education: Osmania Medical College
- Occupations: Physician Advisor on Public Health, Government of Andhra Pradesh
- Known for: Public Health

K. Srinath Reddy is an Indian physician and the Founder President of the Public Health Foundation of India and formerly headed the Department of Cardiology at All India Institute of Medical Sciences (AIIMS).

== Career ==
Reddy is the Founder (Past) President, Public Health Foundation of India (PHFI) and formerly headed the Department of Cardiology at All India Institute of Medical Sciences (AIIMS). He was appointed as the First Bernard Lown Visiting Professor of Cardiovascular Health at the Harvard School of Public Health in (2009–13) and presently serves as an adjunct professor of Epidemiology at Harvard (2014-2023). He is also an adjunct professor of the Rollins School of Public Health, Emory University and Honorary Professor of Medicine at the University of Sydney. Reddy obtained his medical degree from Osmania Medical College (Hyderabad), M.D. (Medicine) and D.M. (Cardiology) degrees from the All India Institute of Medical Sciences (Delhi) and M.Sc. (Epidemiology) from McMaster University (Hamilton, Canada). Having trained in cardiology and epidemiology, Reddy has been involved in several major international and national research studies including the INTERSALT global study of blood pressure and electrolytes, INTERHEART global study on risk factors of myocardial infarction, national collaborative studies on epidemiology of coronary heart disease and community control of rheumatic heart disease. Reddy has been a researcher, teacher, policy enabler, advocate and activist who has worked to promote cardiovascular health, tobacco control, appropriate nutrition across the life course, chronic disease prevention and healthy living across the lifespan. He edited the National Medical Journal of India for 10 years and is on editorial board of several international and national journals.

He has served on many WHO expert panels and has been the President of the World Heart Federation (2013–14). He chaired the Core Advisory Group on Health and Human Rights for the National Human Rights Commission of India for several years and was a member of the first National Science and Engineering Research Board of Government of India. He chaired the High Level Expert Group on Universal Health Coverage, set up by the Planning Commission of India. He has also served as the President of the National Board of Examinations which deals with post-graduate medical education in India.

Reddy is a member of the Leadership Council of the Sustainable Development Solutions Network (ww.unsdsn.org), established to assist the United Nations in developing the post-2015 goals for sustainable development. He chairs the Thematic Group on Health in the SDSN. Reddy is a member of the Global Panel on Agriculture and Food Systems for Nutrition. He also Co-chaired the Health Ministry Steering Committee on Health Related Effects of Air Pollution. He has served as member of the Lancet Commissions on : Health Professional Education for the 21st Century; Investing in Health; Alleviating the access abyss in palliative care and pain relief; High Quality Health Systems. Since 2022, Reddy has been a member of the Commission for Universal Health convened by Chatham House and co-chaired by Helen Clark and Jakaya Kikwete.

== Awards and honours ==
His contributions to public health have been recognized through several awards. They include: WHO Director General's Award for Outstanding Global Leadership in Tobacco Control (World Health Assembly, 2003), Padma Bhushan (Presidential Honour, India, 2005), Queen Elizabeth Medal (Royal Society for Health Promotion, UK, 2005), Luther Terry Medal for Leadership in Tobacco Control (American Cancer Society, 2009), Membership of the US National Academies (Institute of Medicine, 2005), Fellowship of the London School of Hygiene and Tropical Medicine (2009), Fellowship of the Faculty of Public Health, UK (2009).

He was awarded Doctor of Science (Honoris Causa) conferred by University of Aberdeen, Scotland (2011), Dr. NTR Medical University (2011), University of Lausanne, Switzerland (2012), and University of Glasgow, Scotland (2013) and Doctor of Literature (Honoris Causa) conferred by the Jodhpur National University, India (2013) & Doctor of Science (Medicine), Honoris Causa, University of London, UK (2014). He was elected as Foreign Associate Member of the National Academy of Medicine, USA in 2004 and was made a Fellow of the London School of Hygiene and Tropical Medicine in 2009.

- 2003: WHO Director General's Award for Outstanding Global Leadership in Tobacco Control
- 2005: He is awarded the Padma Bhushan, civilian award from the President of India for his contribution to Public health.
- 2009: Fellowship of the Faculty of Public Health, UK
- 2012: Doctor honoris causa of the University of Lausanne
- 2012: Dr. Reddy has been elected as the President of World Heart Federation (WHF) for the period 2013 to 2015.
- 2014: Conferred the degree of Doctor of Science (Medicine) honoris causa by the University of London on 26 November 2014. This was awarded to him by the Princess Royal of Britain, Princess Anne, Chancellor of the London University.
