= Satish SC Rao =

Satish Sanku Chander Rao is the J.Harold Harrison Distinguished University Chair in Gastroenterology at the Medical College of Georgia, Augusta University. He served as the former President of the American Neurogastroenterology and Motility Society and as Chair of the American Gastroenterological Association (AGA) Institute Council, Neurogastroenterology/Motility Section.

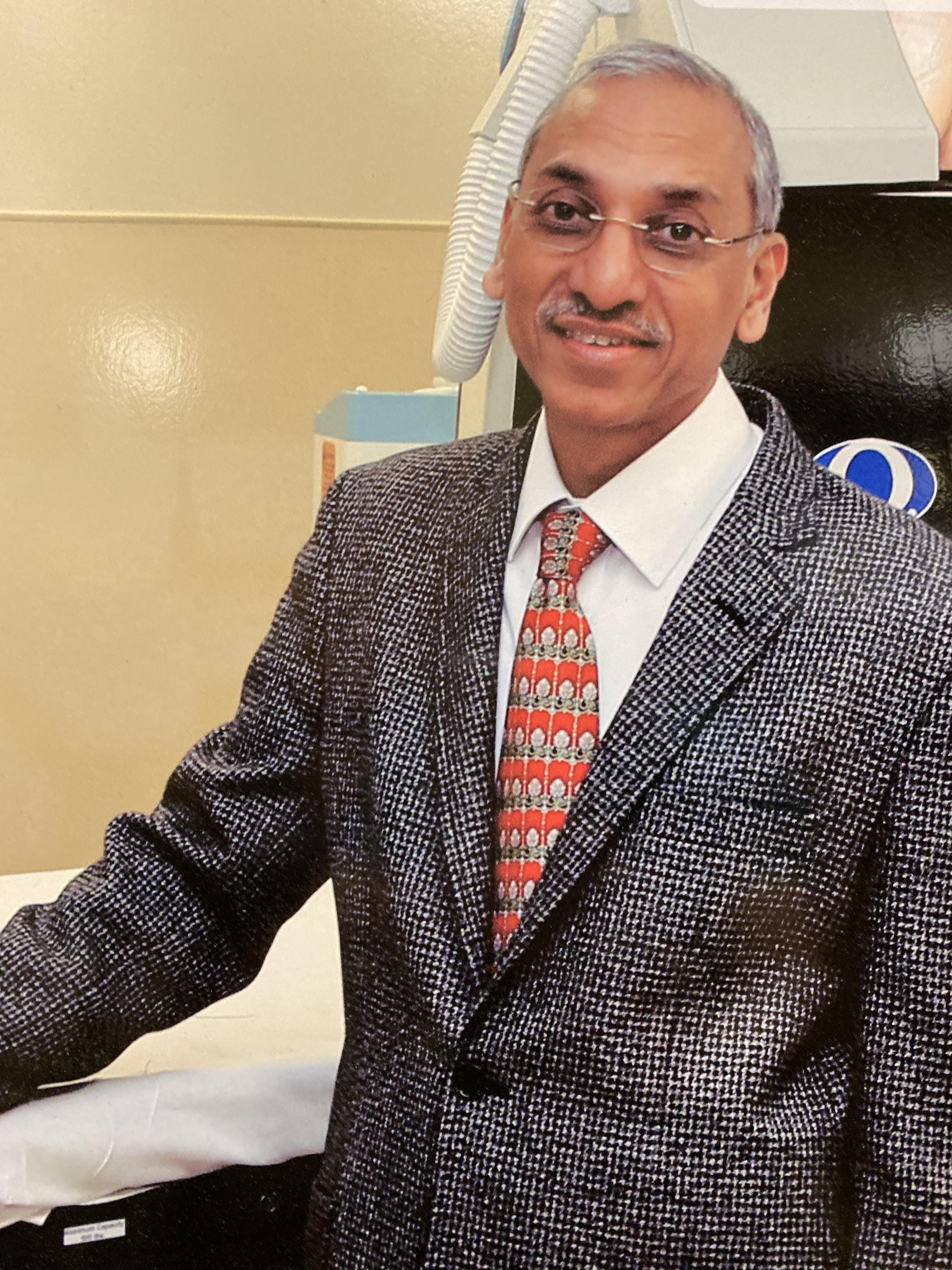
Satish SC Rao

== Education ==
Satish Rao earned his medical degree from Osmania Medical College, Osmania University, Hyderabad, India. He completed Internal Medicine residency at the Sunderland and York Hospitals and Gastroenterology Fellowship training at the University of Sheffield and Royal Liverpool Hospitals, UK. He obtained his MRCP from the Royal College of Physicians (LON) and PhD from University of Sheffield, and is board certified in internal medicine and gastroenterology in USA.

== Research and career ==
Rao is the founding director of the Digestive Health Center, and the Digestive Health Clinical Research Center and Director, Neurogastroenterology/Motility at Augusta University Medical Center and as a Professor of Medicine (Tenure) at the Augusta University. He served the Chief of the Division of Gastroenterology, Director, GI Service Line, and Fellowship Program Director. Before that, he was a Professor of Medicine and Director of Neurogastroenterology and GI motility and biofeedback program at the University of Iowa Carver College of Medicine, Iowa City, IA.

His research interests in the field of Neurogastroenterology/Motility have focused on gaining mechanistic insights, developing novel diagnostic tools and treatments for common motility disorders especially constipation with dyssynergic defecation, fecal incontinence, IBS, food intolerance notably fructose and fructan, gas and bloating and small intestinal bacterial and fungal overgrowth (SIBO/SIFO) and visceral pain.

He is credited with identifying dyssynergic defecation, a problem that affects 1/3 of constipated patients and for developing its remedy, biofeedback therapy as well as new treatments, sensory adaptation training for rectal hypersensitivity. He has pioneered several novel tests, translumbosacral anorectal magnetic stimulation for pelvic floor neuropathy, esophageal balloon distension for chest pain, fructose and fructan breath tests, and treatments such as home biofeedback for dyssynergia and translumbosacral neuromodulation therapy for fecal incontinence and bowel problems. He developed the first method for examining the bi-directional gut and brain axis in humans.

He has been awarded 4 patents. He is a federally funded principal investigator for 26 years and currently holds NIH UO-1 and RO-1 grants. Dr. Rao has edited 10 books, including Handbook of GI Motility (2015), and Clinical and Basic Neurogastroenterology & Motility (2020). He has published over 700 peer-reviewed articles with 36,500 citations, and an h-index of 103 and ilo index of 225. He has been awarded 3 copyrights for patient-reported symptom diaries and digital Apps for fecal incontinence, constipation and gas/bloating. An astute clinician, Dr. Rao has been selected as one of the “Best Doctors in America” and as Americas’ Top Doctors for over 25 years. He has been invited to lecture in 40 countries as visiting professor. These include live demonstrations and workshops on anorectal manometry, esophageal manometry, and biofeedback therapy and novel TNT procedures, and to train peers globally.

== Awards and honors ==
Rao has received 5 meritorious honors from the American Gastroenterological Association (AGA), the AGA Distinguished Clinician Award, AGA Masters Award for Outstanding Clinical Research, AGA Distinguished Educator Award, AGA Institute Distinguished Research Mentor Award in NGM and AGA Distinguished Mentor Award. He received the American College of Gastroenterology Auxiliary Research Award, the IFFGD Senior Clinical Investigator Award, the University of Iowa Regents Distinguished Award for Faculty Excellence, “Dr. PN Chuttani Oration”, the highest honor from Indian Society of Gastroenterology, 13 Distinguished National/International Professorships, Augusta University Distinguished Research Award and the J Harold Harrison, MD, Distinguished University Chair in Gastroenterology and in 2026 the Rome Foundation Aldo Torsoli International award for Gut and Brain Disorders.

== Editorships ==
Rao has edited ten books including Gastrointestinal Motility: tests and problem-oriented approach, ”Handbook of gastrointestinal motility and functional disorders”. Dr. Rao penned the book “G.I. Motility Testing: A laboratory and office handbook”. His latest book is “Clinical and Basic Neurogastroenterology/Motility which is the most comprehensive text in the field”.

He has served as a Guest editor of the Gastroenterology Clinics of North America, and on the Editorial Boards of American Journal of Gastroenterology. American Journal of Physiology (GI), Current Gastroenterology Reports, and GI and Endoscopy News.

== Publications ==
- Rao SSC, Read NW, Brown C, Bruce C, Holdsworth CD. Studies on the Mechanism of Bowel Disturbances in Ulcerative Colitis. Gastroenterology 1987; 93: 934-40.
- Rao SSC, Gregersen H, Hayek B, Summers RW, Christensen J. Unexplained Chest Pain: The Hypersensitive, Hyperreactive and Poorly Compliant Esophagus. Ann Intern Med 1996; 124:
- Rao SSC, Welcher KD, Leistikow JS. Obstructed Defecation: A Failure of Recto-Anal Coordination. Am J Gastroenterol 1998; 93: 1042-50.
- Rao SSC, Azpiroz F, Diamant N, et al. Minimum Standards of Anorectal Manometry. Neurogastroenterol Motil 2002;
- Choi Y, Johlin F, Jackson M, et al. Fructose Intolerance. An under-recognized problem. Am J Gastroenterol 2003;98:1348-53.
- Rao SSC. Diagnosis and management of fecal incontinence. Am J Gastroenterol 2004;99:1585-1604.
- Rao SSC, Ozturk R, Laine L. Clinical utility of diagnostic tests for constipation in adults: A systematic Review . Am J Gastroenterol 2005;100:1605-15.
- Rao SSC, Kinkade K, Miller MJ, et al. Randomized controlled trial of biofeedback therapy for dyssynergic defecation. Clinical Gastroenterol Hepatol 2007;5:331-338.
