= Undurti Narasimha Das =

Indian biologist

- Born: 28 June 1950 (age 76); Kakinada, Andhra Pradesh, India
- Education: Andhra University; Osmania University
- Known for: Studies on Endocrinology and Rheumatology
- Awards: 1988 ICMR Shakuntala Amirchand Prize; 1992 Shanti Swarup Bhatnagar Prize; 1992 Association of Physicians of India Dr. Coelho Memorial Prize; 1992 Japanese Society of Clinical Chemistry Regional Research Award; 1992 Yagnavalki Sangham Award; 1992 PSMA Distinguished Citizen Award; 1994 KAPI Bobba Dharma Rao Prize
- Scientific career
- Fields: Immunology; Endocrinology; Rheumatology
- Workplaces: Asha Nutrition Sciences, Inc.; Osmania University; Efamol Research Institute; Nizam's Institute of Medical Sciences; L. V. Prasad Eye Institute; EFA Sciences; SUNY Upstate Medical University; IKP Centre for Technologies in Public Health; Gayatri Vidya Parishad College of Engineering; UND Life Sciences

Undurti Narasimha Das (born 1950) shortly Undurti N. Das and U. N. Das is an Indian clinical immunologist, endocrinologist and the founder president and chief executive officer of UND Life Sciences. Additionally, he serves as the Chief Medical Officer and the Chairman of the Scientific Advisory Board of Asha Nutrition Sciences, Inc. An elected fellow of the National Academy of Medical Sciences, Das is known for his researches in the fields of Immunology, Endocrinology and Rheumatology. He holds a number of patents for his work The Council of Scientific and Industrial Research, the apex agency of the Government of India for scientific research, awarded him the Shanti Swarup Bhatnagar Prize for Science and Technology, one of the highest Indian science awards for his contributions to Medical Sciences in 1992. (Note: Long link - please select award year to see details)

== Biography ==
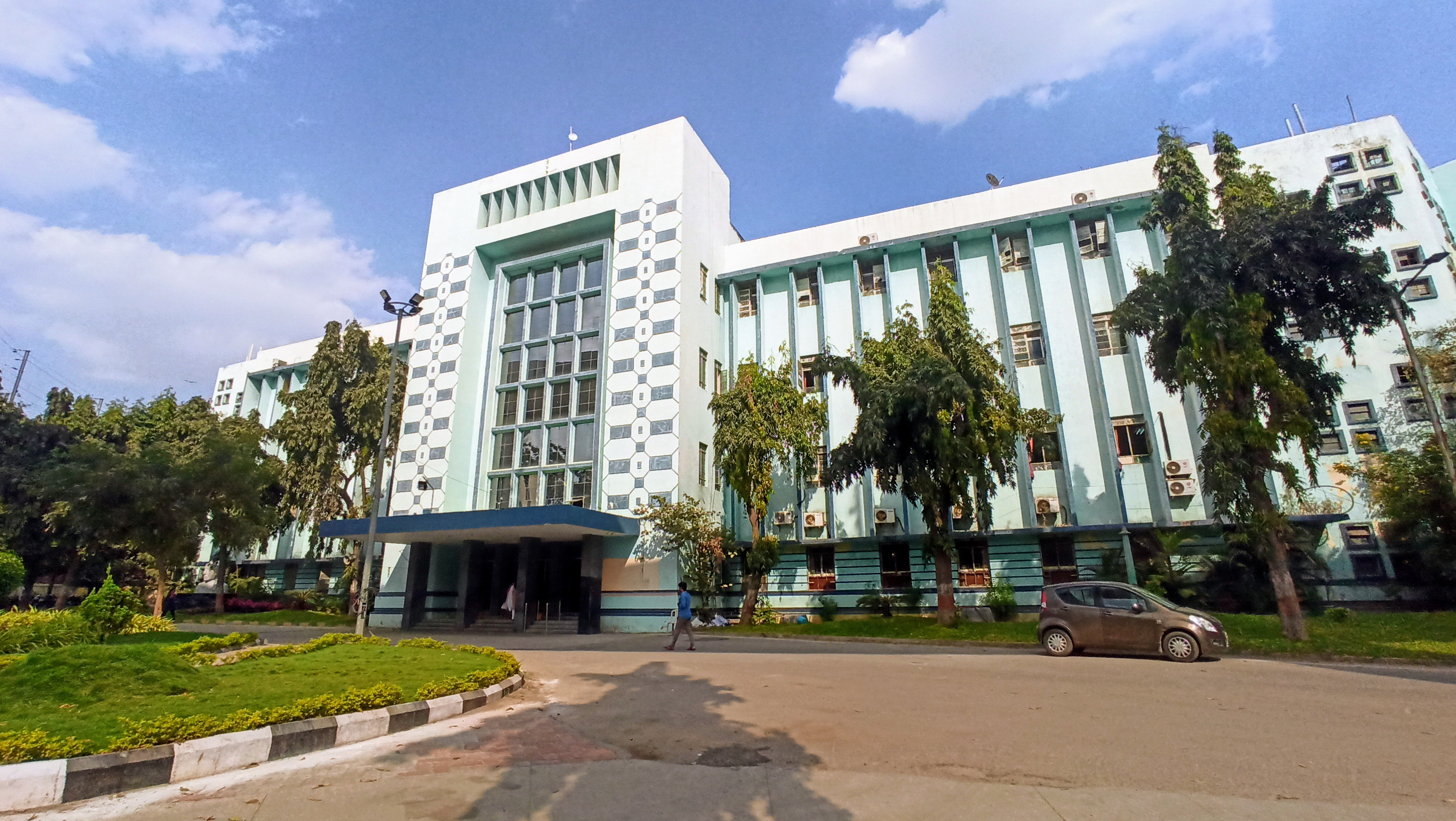
Osmania Medical College

Born to Kameshwari and Undurti Sitarama Swamy on 28 June 1950 at Kakinada, a large city in the south Indian state of Andhra Pradesh, Undurti N. Das graduated in medicine from Andhra Medical College of the Andhra University in 1973. Subsequently, he joined Osmania Medical College as a senior research fellow of the Indian Council of Medical Research and the Council of Scientific and Industrial Research, simultaneously pursuing his higher studies to secure an MD in 1981. He continued at the institution at the Department of Genetics as an ICMR Research Associate, doing his post-doctoral work for 3 years. In 1984, he moved to Canada to join Efamol Research Institute, Kentville, as a scientist, where he stayed for two years, and on his return to India in 1986, he joined Nizam's Institute of Medical Sciences as an associate professor at the department of clinical pharmacology and medical research. He served the institution till 1996, holding the position of a professor from 1990 onward. For the next three years, he was with L. V. Prasad Eye Institute as a professor and the head of the Division of Internal Medicine, Clinical Immunology and Biochemistry. In 1999, he had his second stint abroad, this time in the US, where he chaired EFA Sciences, Norwood as its research director. His service at EFA lasted till 2004, during which period he also served as a research professor of surgery, nutrition, and physiology at the State University of New York Upstate Medical University from 2003 to 2004. That year, he founded UND Life Sciences at Shaker Heights, Ohio, a biotechnology company, and became its founder president and chief executive officer. Between 2007 and 2009, he had a brief stay in India as the Research Director of IKP Centre for Technologies in Public Health, Chennai.

Das is married to Lakshmi and the couple has two children, Arundhati and Aditya. He holds the positions of the CEO and research director of UND Life Sciences and is a director of Primrose Biosciences, a Hyderabad-based company involved in research and experimental development in the field of natural sciences and engineering.

On January 1, 2013, Dr. Das joined Asha Nutrition Sciences, Inc. as the Chief Medical Officer and the Chairman of the Scientific Advisory Board.

== Legacy ==
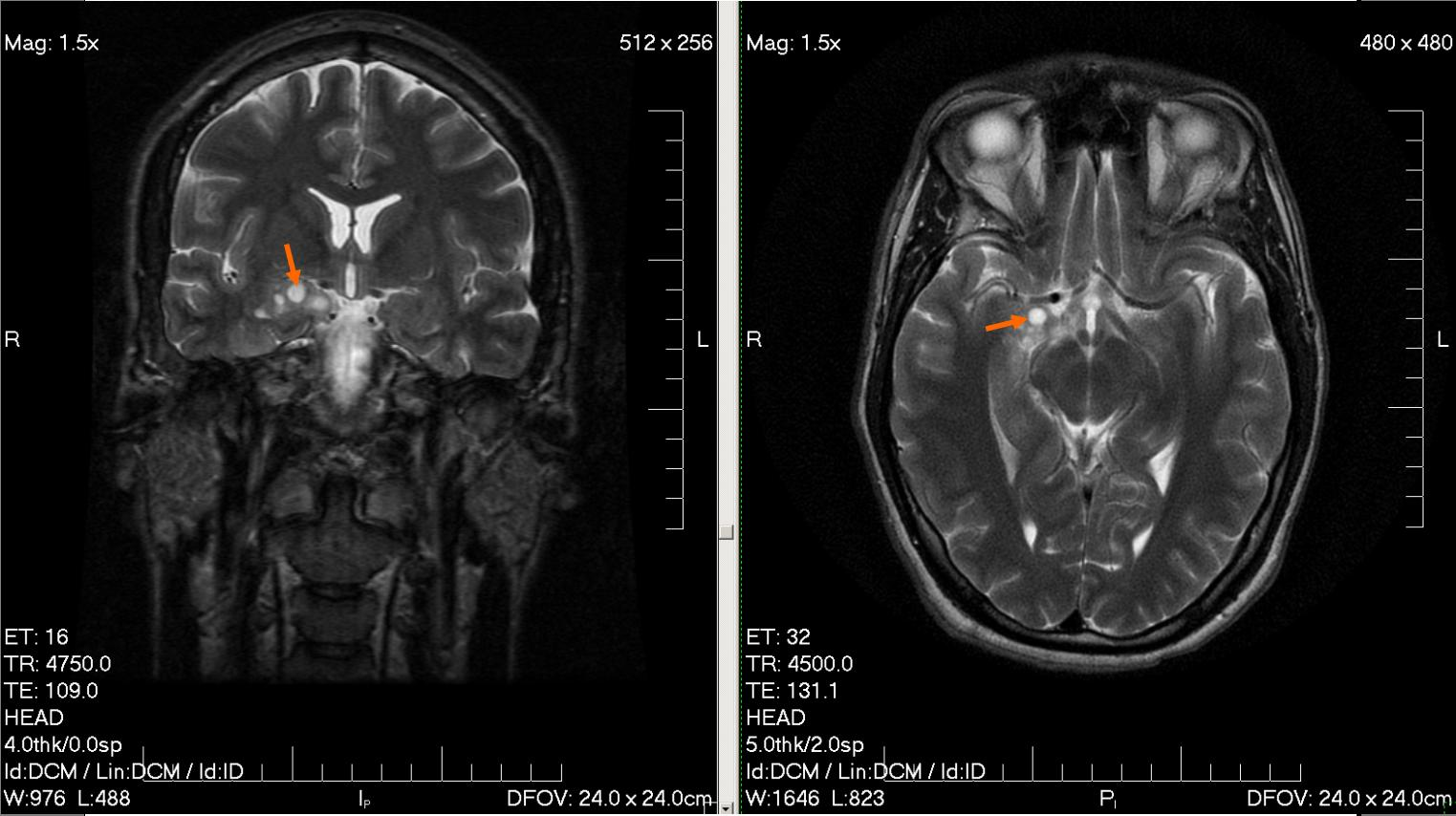
Glioma – MRI

Researches of U. N. Das are focused on various disease processes and his researches have revealed the tumoricidal properties of cis-unsaturated fatty acids as well as the role of gamma-Linolenic acid in controlling the progress of glioma, a type of tumor which affects brain and spinal cord. He has also worked on drug development to combat diseases and conditions such as obesity, cancer, diabetes, hypertension and schizophrenia. His researches have been documented by way of several articles; (Note: Please see Selected bibliography section) ResearchGate an online repository of scientific articles has listed 500 of them. Besides, he has authored three books, viz. Metabolic Syndrome Pathophysiology: The Role of Essential Fatty Acids, Molecular Basis of Health and Disease (Note: Published under Ramalingaswami Re-entry fellowship of the Department of Biotechnology) and A Perinatal Strategy For Preventing Adult Disease: The Role of Long-Chain Polyunsaturated Fatty Acids. He holds a number of patents for his work, which include "Method of potentiating the action of 2-methoxyoestradiol, statins and C-peptide of proinsulin, Method(s) of stabilizing and potentiating the actions and administration of brain-derived neurotrophic factor (BDNF) Method of stabilizing and potentiating the action of anti-angiogenic substances, Method(s) of preventing, arresting, reversing and treatment of atherosclerosis, and Methods for selectively occluding blood supplies to neoplasias and Butyrylcholinesterase as a marker of low-grade systemic inflammation.

Das is the editor-in-chief of Lipids in Health and Disease, a journal published by BioMed Central and Current Nutrition & Food Science, published by Bentham Science. (Note: Das is a former member of the editorial boards of four other Bentham Science publications viz. Open Nutrition Journal, Open Nutrition Reviews, Open Nutrition Letters and Current Pharmaceutical Biotechnology.) He is the section editor of Medicine journal, a member of the editorial board of the controversial and non-peer reviewed journal Medical Hypotheses and the Journal of Geriatric Cardiology and sits in the scientific advisory board of Techno Scienze Publisher which publishes a number of journals. He is also a member of the editorial review board of Journal of Applied Research in Clinical and Experimental Therapeutics and has been associated with a number of other journals as a member of their editorial boards or the Panel of Reviewers which include World Journal of Diabetes, European Journal of General Medicine, Journal of the Association of Physicians of India, Frontiers in Biosciences, Diabetes Review Letters, Open Colorectal Cancer Journal, Indian Journal of Medical Research and Gene Therapy and Molecular Biology. He has also been a member of the International Advisory Board of the II International Conference on Functional Foods for the Prevention and Treatment of Chronic Diseases, organized by Functional Foods Center, held in November, 2005 at Richardson, Texas;

== Awards and honors ==
Das, a Ramalingaswamy Re-entry Fellow of the Department of Biotechnology, received the Shakuntala Amirchand Prize of the Indian Council of Medical Research in 1988 and the Council of Scientific and Industrial Research awarded him Shanti Swarup Bhatnagar Prize, one of the highest Indian science awards in 1992. He delivered the Dr. Coelho Memorial Award Oration of Association of Physicians of India in 1992; the same year as he received the Regional Research Award of the Japanese Society of Clinical Chemistry. He also received two minor awards in 1992 viz. Yagnavalki Sangham Award and Distinguished Citizen Award of Pramukh Swamy Maharaj of Aksharadham and the Karnataka Association of Physicians of India awarded him the Bobba Dharma Rao Prize in 1994. In between, the National Academy of Medical Sciences elected him as a fellow in 1992 and the Indian College of Physicians followed suit in 1993. He is also a fellow of the Royal Society of Chemistry, a founder member of Telangana Academy of Sciences and a member of science organizations such as New York Academy of Sciences, American Association for the Advancement of Science and Society for Experimental Biology and Medicine, New York.

== Selected bibliography ==
=== Books ===
- Undurti N. Das (31 May 2002). A Perinatal Strategy For Preventing Adult Disease: The Role of Long-Chain Polyunsaturated Fatty Acids. Springer Science & Business Media. ISBN 978-1-4020-7070-9.
- Undurti N. Das (22 February 2010). Metabolic Syndrome Pathophysiology: The Role of Essential Fatty Acids. John Wiley & Sons. ISBN 978-0-8138-1553-4.
- Undurti N. Das (2 April 2011). Molecular Basis of Health and Disease. Springer Science & Business Media. ISBN 978-94-007-0495-4.

=== Articles ===
- Undurti N Das (2011). "Essential fatty acids enhance free radical generation and lipid peroxidation to induce apoptosis of tumor cells". Clinical Lipidology. 6 (4): 463–489. doi:10.2217/clp.11.34. S2CID 86789687.
- Umashankar Vetrivel, Sathya Baarathi Ravichandran, Kaviarasan KuppanJithu Mohanlal, Undurti Narasimha Das, Angayarkanni Narayanasamy (2012). "Agonistic effect of polyunsaturated fatty acids (PUFAs) and its metabolites on brain-derived neurotrophic factor (BDNF) through molecular docking simulation". Lipids in Health and Disease. 11 (109) 109. doi:10.1186/1476-511X-11-109. PMC 3477081. PMID 22943296.
- Undurti Narasimha Das (2013). "Lipoxins, resolvins, protectins, maresins and nitrolipids, and their clinical implications with specific reference to cancer: part I". Clinical Lipidology. 8 (4): 437–463. doi:10.2217/clp.13.31. S2CID 218587142.
- Undurti Narasimha Das (2013). "Lipoxins, resolvins, protectins, maresins and nitrolipids, and their clinical implications with specific reference to diabetes mellitus and other diseases: part II". Clinical Lipidology. 8 (4): 465–480. doi:10.2217/clp.13.32. S2CID 218590607.
- Gustavo Tomas Diaz-Gerevini, Gaston Repossi, Alejandro Dain, María Cristina Tarres, Undurti Narasimha Das, Aldo Renato Eynard (2016). "Beneficial action of resveratrol: How and why?". Nutrition. 32 (2): 174–178. doi:10.1016/j.nut.2015.08.017. hdl:11336/57909. PMID 26706021.

=== Reviews ===
- Ikuo Kimura; Atsuhiko Ichimura (3 February 2016). Obesity and Diabetes: Energy Regulation by Free Fatty Acid Receptors. Frontiers Media SA. pp. 17–. ISBN 978-2-88919-747-7.
- Zeynep Goktas, Naima Moustaid-Moussa, Chwan-Li Shen, Mallory Boylan, Huanbiao Mo and ShuWang (10 June 2013). "Effects of bariatric surgery on adipokine-induced inflammation and insulin resistance". Frontiers in Endocrinology. 4: 69. doi:10.3389/fendo.2013.00069. PMC 3677351. PMID 23772224.

=== Patents ===
- Undurti Narasimha Das (20 June 2002). "Method of potentiating the action of 2-methoxyoestradiol, statins and C-peptide of proinsulin". US Patent 20020077317. Justia Patents.
- Undurti Narasimha Das (16 January 2003). "Methods for selectively occluding blood supplies to neoplasias". US20030013759 A1. Google Patents.
- Appa Rao Allam, Sridhar Gumpeny, Undurti Narasimha Das (7 August 2008). "Butyrylcholinesterase as a marker of low-grade systemic inflammation". US20080187944 A1. Google Patents.
- Undurti Narasimha Das, Appa Rao Allam (25 September 2008). "Method(s) of stabilizing and potentiating the actions and administration of brain-derived neurotrophic factor (BDNF)". US Patent 20080234197. Justia Patents.
- Undurti Narasimha Das (23 February 2010). "Method of stabilizing and potentiating the action of anti-angiogenic substances". US Patent 7666910. Justia Patents.
- Undurti Narasimha Das, Appa Rao Allam (10 April 2012). "Method(s) of preventing, arresting, reversing and treatment of atherosclerosis". US Patent 8153392. Justia Patents.

== See also ==
- Neoplasm
- Lipid peroxidation
- Brain-derived neurotrophic factor
- Lipoxins
- Resolvin
- Protectin
- Maresin
