= Victoria Maternity Hospital, Hyderabad =

Hospital in Hyderabad, India

Victoria Maternity Hospital
- Government of Telangana
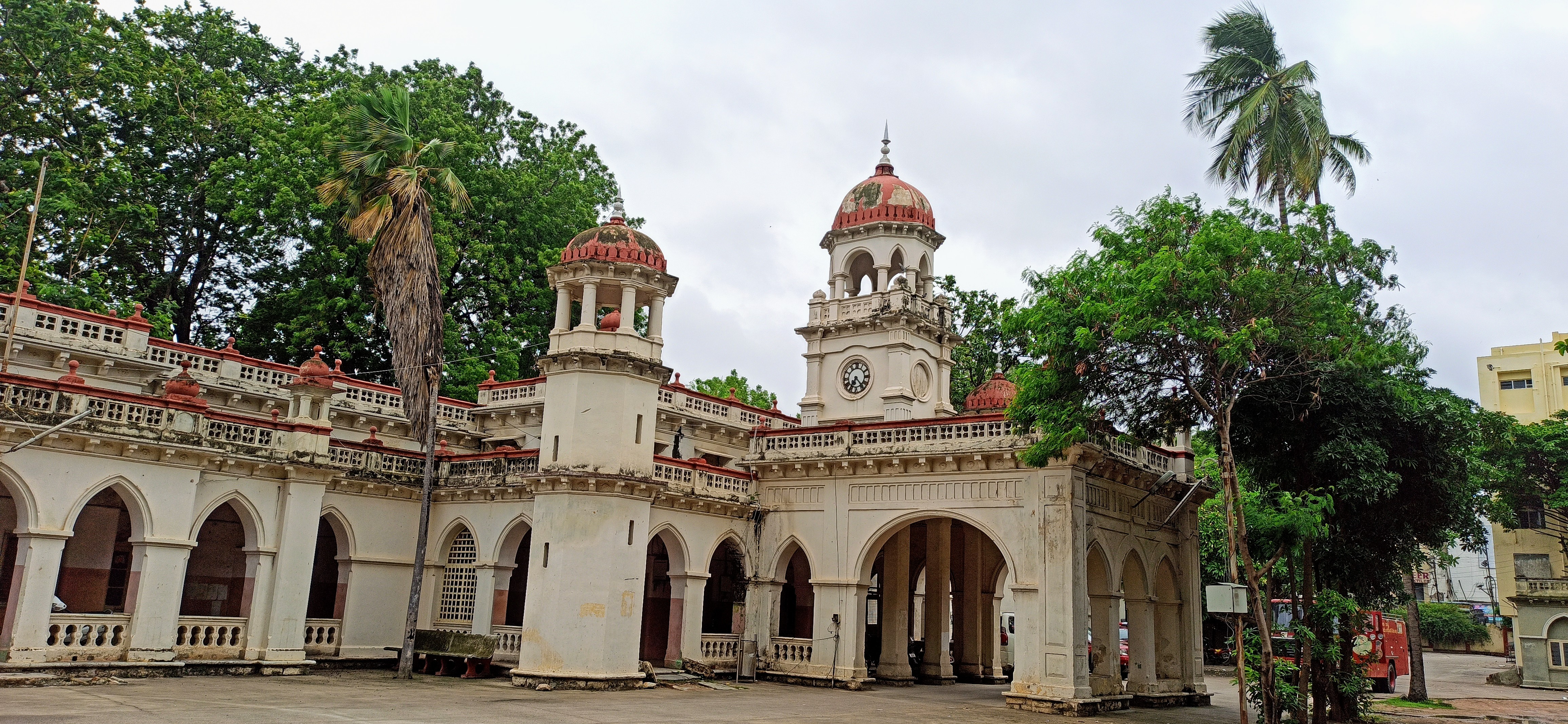
- Erstwhile Victoria Maternity Hospital

Geography
- Location: Hyderabad, Telangana, India
- Coordinates: 17.369393°N 78.474956°E

History
- Opened: 1907; 119 years ago

Links
- Lists: Hospitals in India

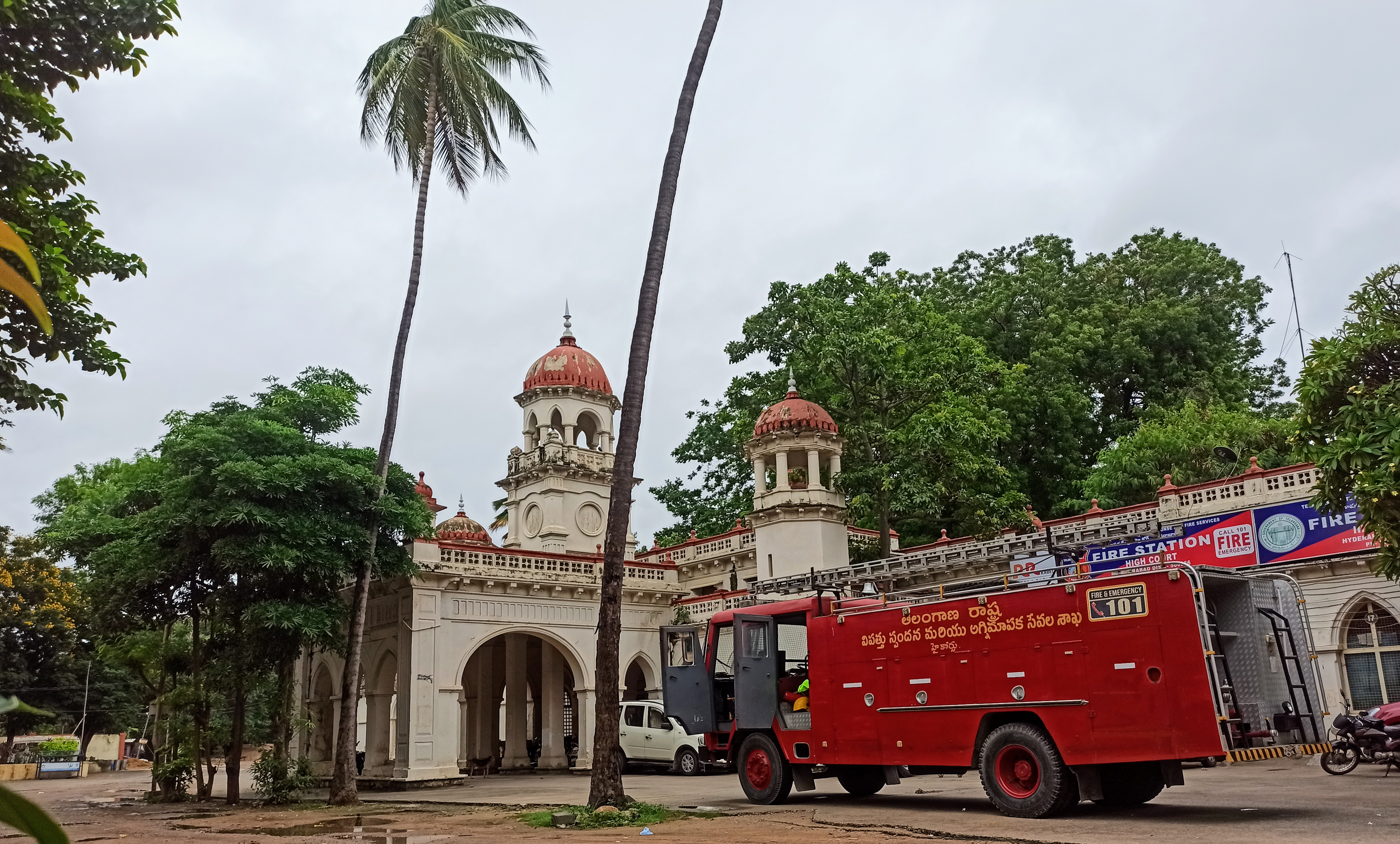
The hospital has been converted to a fire station

Victoria Maternity Hospital, also known as Victoria Zenana Hospital, was the second biggest hospital in Hyderabad, India, after Afzalgunj Hospital. It no longer exists, and was converted into a block of Telangana High Court to house fire engines. The hospital has been shifted to a new location and today this building is called H-block of the High Court.

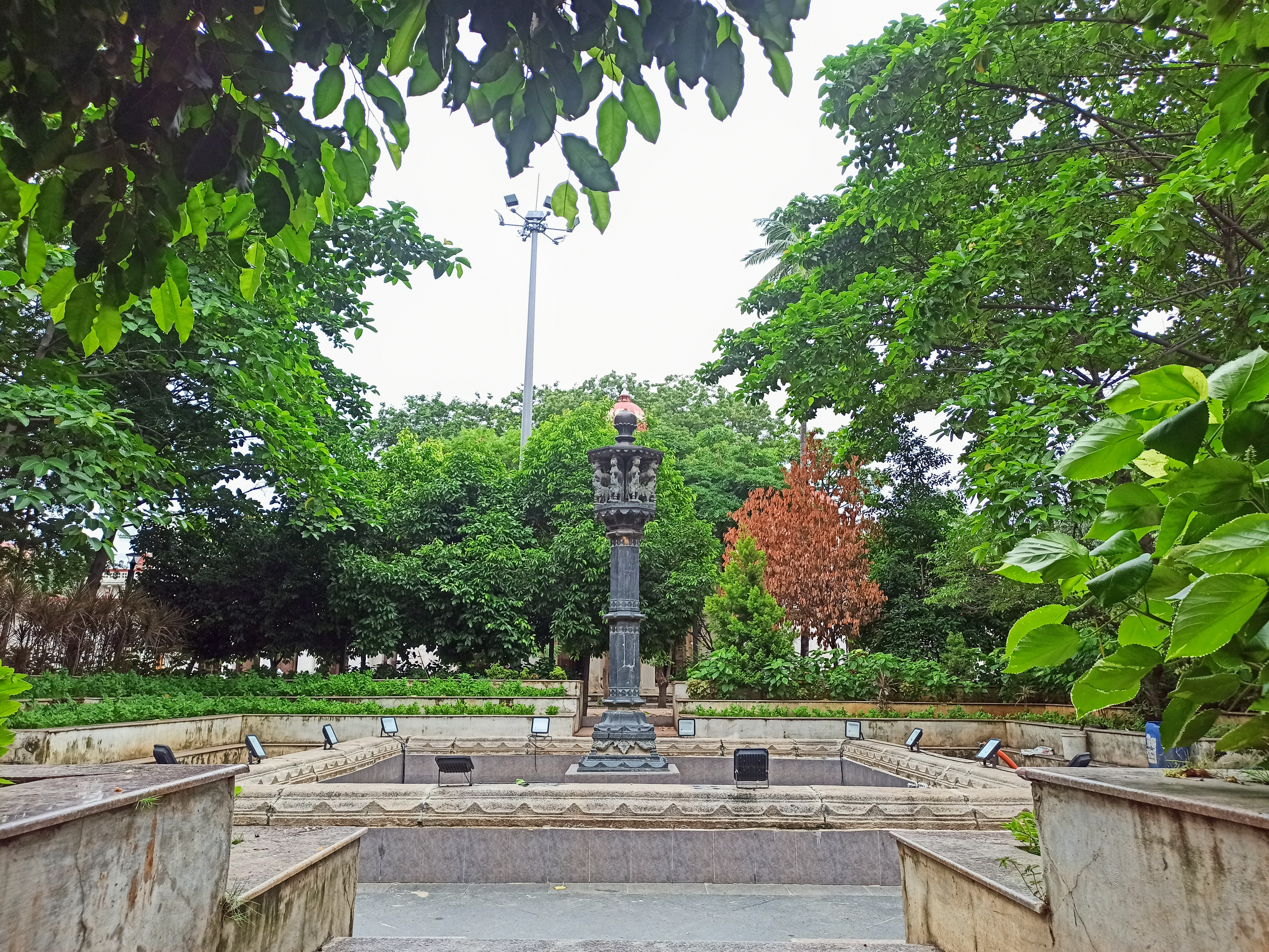
The Dog fountain is proposed to be demolished

The building was previously categorised as a Heritage Building as per HUDA regulations and in 2010 was delisted from the list of Heritage building so as to be demolished and to be converted into a multi-level car park for the employees of High Court and visitors. The government order to demolish was issued in April 2019 and the High Court proposed that work be taken up in May during the summer vacations.

The hospital premises also contains a fountain known as "Dog Fountain" from the Qutub Shahi era which is also set to be demolished.

On 16 May 2019, based on an appeal by heritage activists, the order to demolish the Zenana building was stayed by High Court.

== History ==
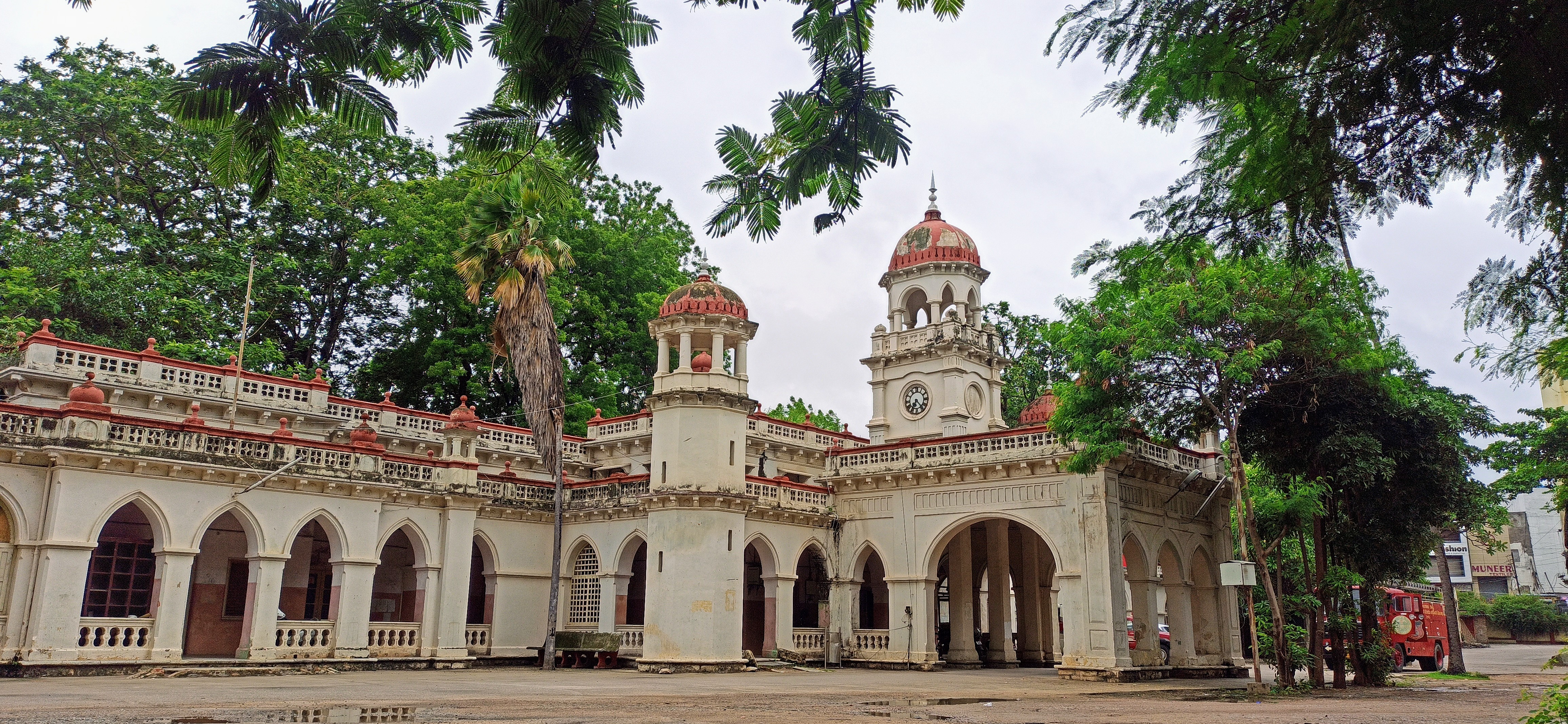
Victoria Maternity Hospital

This was the first hospital built in Hyderabad to exclusively treat women. The foundation of the hospital was laid by Princess of Wales in 1905. The building was built during the reign of the sixth Nizam of Hyderabad.

The hospital was earlier known as Zenana Hospital and later renamed as Victoria Maternity Hospital.

In 1957, Victoria Zenana Hospital was organised into Government Maternity Hospital. From Osmania General Hospital, maternity and gynaec beds were shifted to the newly reorganised hospital.

The world's first qualified women anesthetist Dr Rupa Bai Fardonji worked in this hospital during the 1900s.
