= St. Theresa's Hospital =

- Trust
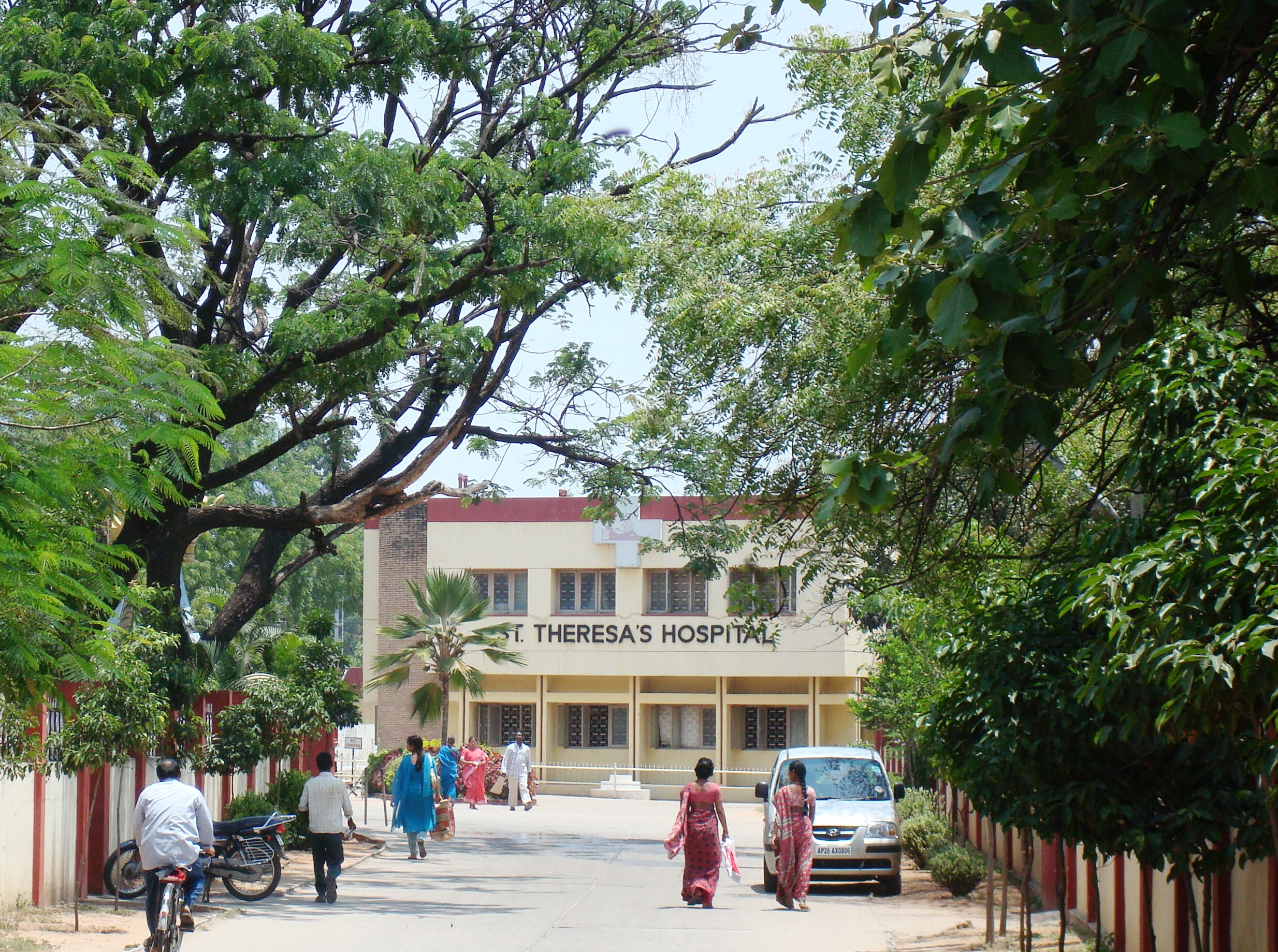

Geography
- Location: Erragadda, Hyderabad, India

Services
- Emergency department: yes
- Beds: 300

History
- Founded: 1960

Links
- Website: https://sttheresashospital.com/
- Lists: Hospitals in India

St. Theresa's Hospital, Erragadda, is a hospital located in Hyderabad, Telangana, India. This hospital is popular for its maternity service. Many under-privileged people depend on this hospital for their healthcare. Many specialists work here at nominal pay, which makes it even more attractive. This hospital was set up in the early 1960s at Saifabad before moving to its present location, Erragadda. It has recently undergone renovation to accommodate more wards.

It has a nursing school called JMJ College of Nursing. There is a large Roman Catholic church within the school.

Former Miss Universe 1994 and Bollywood actress Sushmita Sen was born at this hospital.
