= Government E. N. T. Hospital =

- Government of Telangana
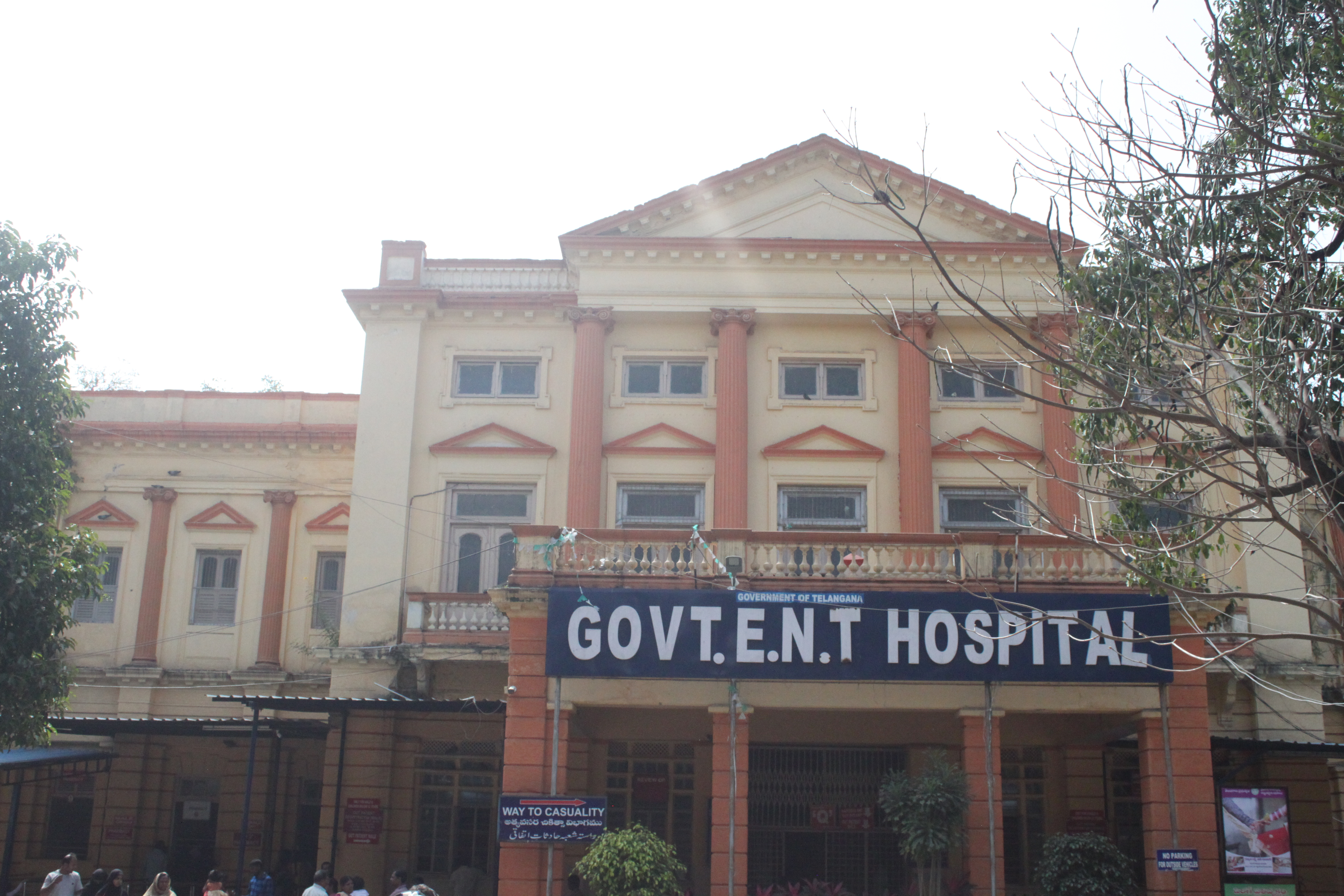

Geography
- Location: 5-1-174, Koti, Hyderabad, India

Organisation
- Care system: Public
- Type: Speciality
- Affiliated university: K.N.R. Health University

Services
- Emergency department: yes

History
- Founded: 1955

Links
- Lists: Hospitals in India

Government E. N. T. Hospital is one of the oldest specialty hospitals in Hyderabad, India. It is located in Koti and run by the Government of Telangana. It exclusively serves the patients with ear, nose and throat diseases across the state of Telangana.

The building now housing the ENT Hospital earlier was the residence of Parsi businessmen brothers Pestonji and Viccaji Meherji

== Departments ==
- Audiology : The audiology wing daily receives about 200 patients. It deals with newborn screening, hearing assessment, hearing loss, rehabilitation and verifying hearing-impaired cases. and it has Special Education School to the Physically challenged (hearing and speech) pupils with specially trained teachers.

The building's architecture is a mixture of Ghothic and Indo style. It is the right place for the archaeology students to study mansion work, glass work and marble sculptures of the old ages.
