= William Campbell Maclean =

Professor of military medicine (1811 – 1898)

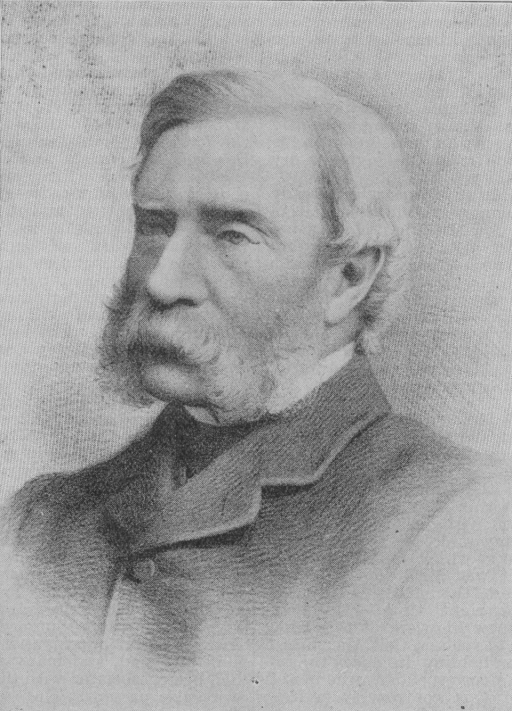

William Campbell Maclean (29 November 1811 – 20 November 1898) was a Surgeon General in the Indian Medical Service. He founded the Hyderabad Medical School which later became the Osmania Medical College. He served as a professor of military medicine at the Army Medical School in Netley from 1860 to 1886.

== Life and work ==
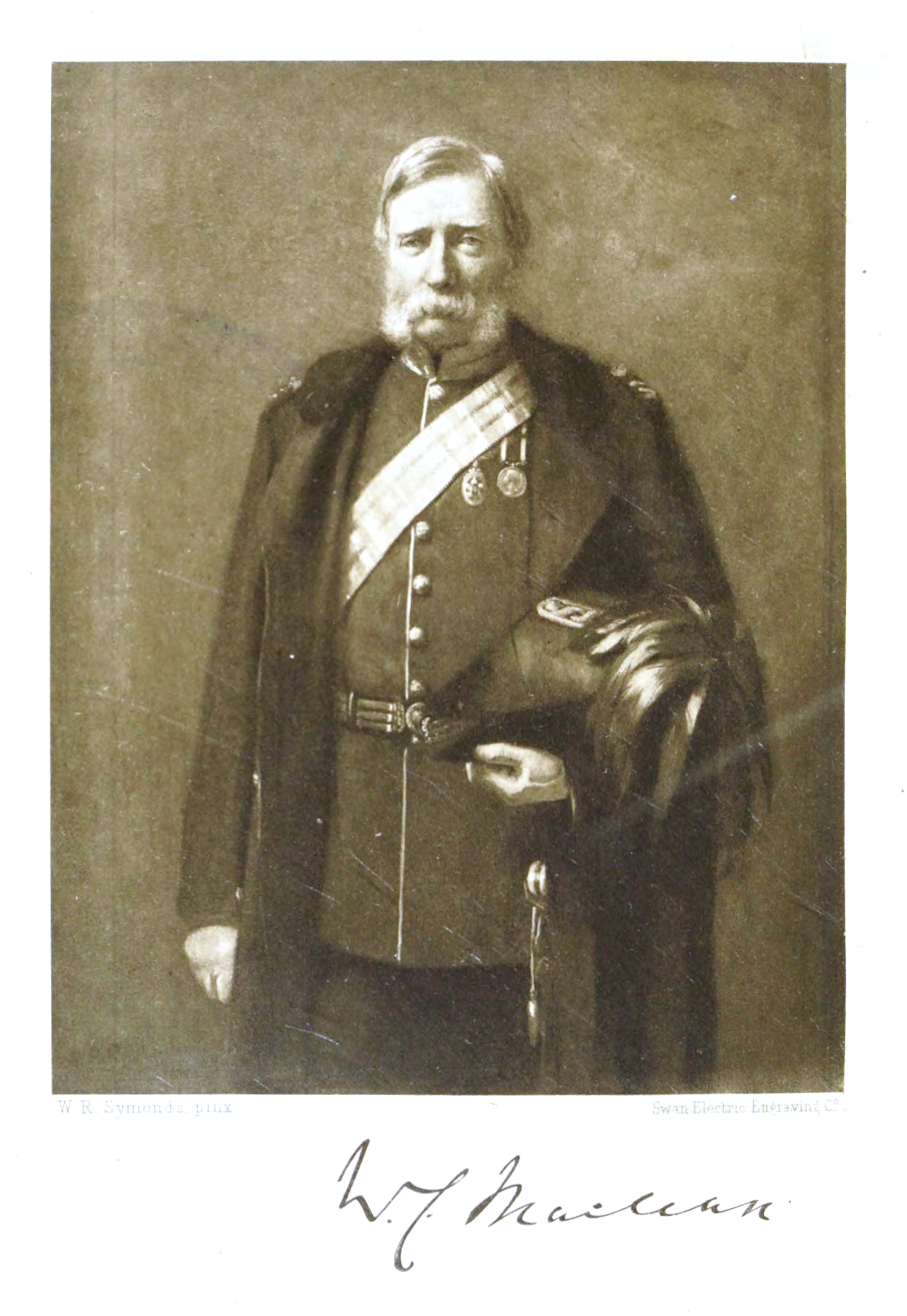

William was born in Blackburn House, Ayr, the tenth of eleven children of his father John was Laird of Boreray and came from the Macleans of Ardgour and on his mother Jesse's side from the MacLeods of Dunvegan. He grew up with home tutors before going to the Dollar and Edinburgh Academies. He joined the University of Edinburgh in 1829 and received the medical license in 1832 and MD in 1833. He worked on ships to Bombay and Java as a physician and spent some time studying in Paris. After joining the Madras Medical Service in 1838 he was attached to the 55th Regiment at Secunderabad. In 1840 he served in Chusan during the opium wars. In 1842 he served with the 18th Royal Irish and then with the 1st Madras Fusiliers at Arcot. He then served in Jabalpur and then moved to Calcutta where his brother worked with Lord Ellenborough. He was offered a civil position through the influence of Lord Ellenborough, but he refused to leave medicine which was his primary interest. In 1845 he became a Resident Surgeon at the Hyderabad Court and was involved in organizing a medical school. The fourth Nizam of Hyderabad Nawab Nasir-ud-Daulah was treated for diabetes by Maclean through diet changes after local practitioners failed to help. This led the Nizam to look upon the system of western medicine more highly and ordered the establishment of a medical school under Maclean. The first seven successful students produced in the school were made taluk physicians. George Smith took over the medical college in December 1854. Maclean moved to Netley in 1860 he moved to the newly founded Army medical school at Netley on the invitation of Sidney Herbert, with advice from Florence Nightingale on suitable terms. He was posted as professor of military medicine and taught there until 1886. At Netley, he was involved in reducing the weight of the gear of army soldiers so as to improve health, a major concern having been heart disease. Maclean was against the issue of alcohol in rations to army soldiers. He also supported an amalgamation of the medical services in the British and Indian armies in India which had been separated on racial lines.

Maclean married Louisa Macpherson in Hyderabad in 1845.
