= Institute of Mental Health (Erragadda) =

- Government of Telangana
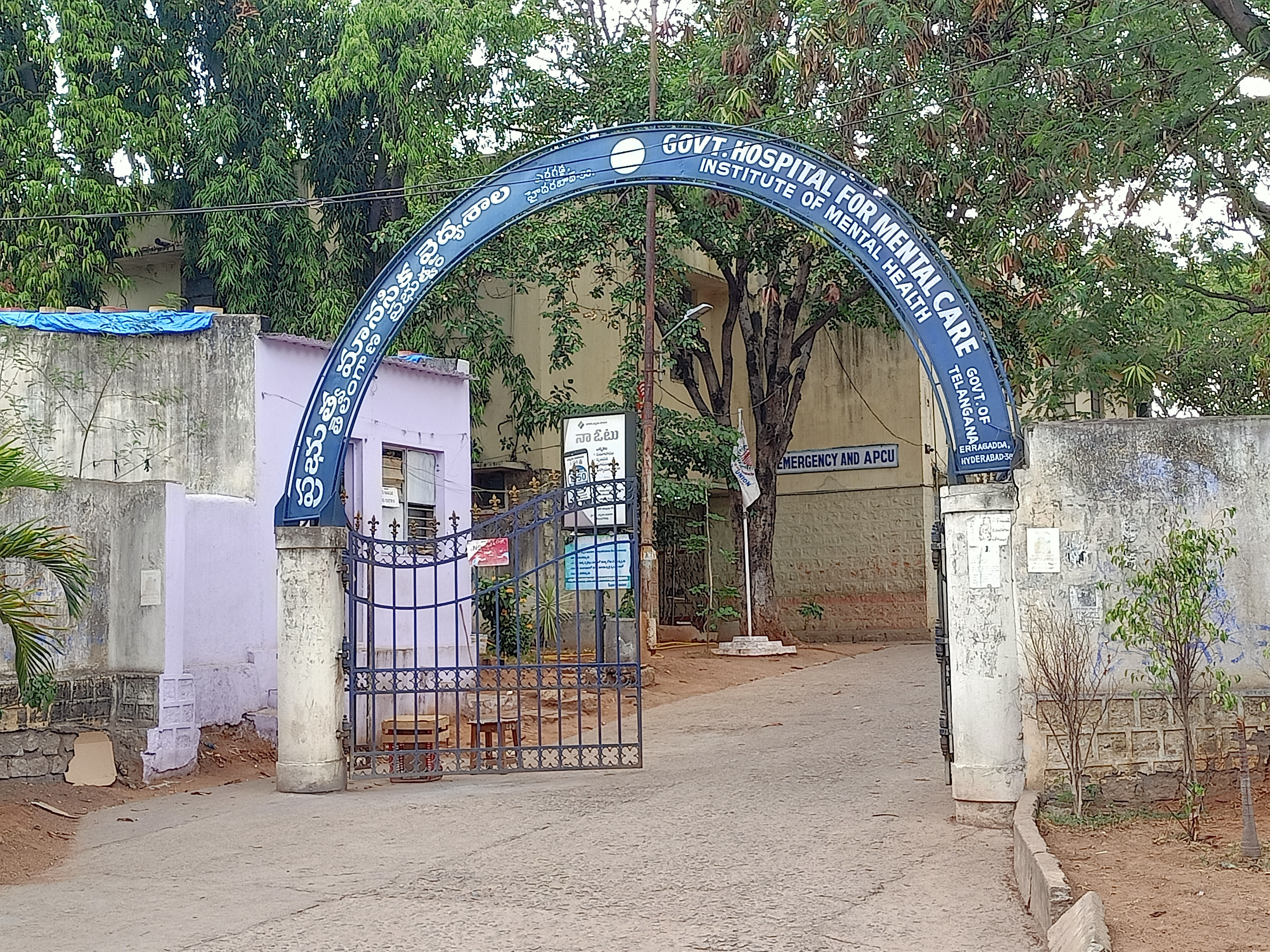

Geography
- Location: Erragadda, Hyderabad, India

Organisation
- Care system: Public
- Type: Speciality
- Affiliated university: Kaloji Narayana Rao University of Health Sciences

Services
- Emergency department: yes
- Beds: 600

History
- Founded: 1895

Links
- Lists: Hospitals in India

The Institute of Mental Health, Erragadda also known as Erragadda Mental Hospital is one of the oldest health institutions established by the Nizams reign in Hyderabad State. It is run by Government of Telangana, located in Erragadda, Hyderabad. It serves the mental health patients from all over the state.

== History ==
Established as Darul-Majanine meaning Mental Asylum in 1895, the hospital was started at Chanchalguda Central Jail and shifted to Jalna (Maharashtra) with 400 beds. The institute was moved to Jalna (part of Nizam dominion at the time) during 1895–1907. The name of the institution changed from Darul-Majanine to Hospital for Mental Diseases, Jalna.

The institute was shifted from Jalna To Hyderabad in 1953 after Hyderabad State (1948–56) was formed and Jalna was merged with Maharashtra. Dr. R. Natarajan was the last superintendent of Govt. Mental Hospital, Jalna and first superintendent of IMH, Erragadda Hyderabad.

== Expansion ==
It is expanded with a new 150-bed block specially meant for the court and criminal cases under the National Mental Health Programme in 2006.
