= Erragadda =

- Urban
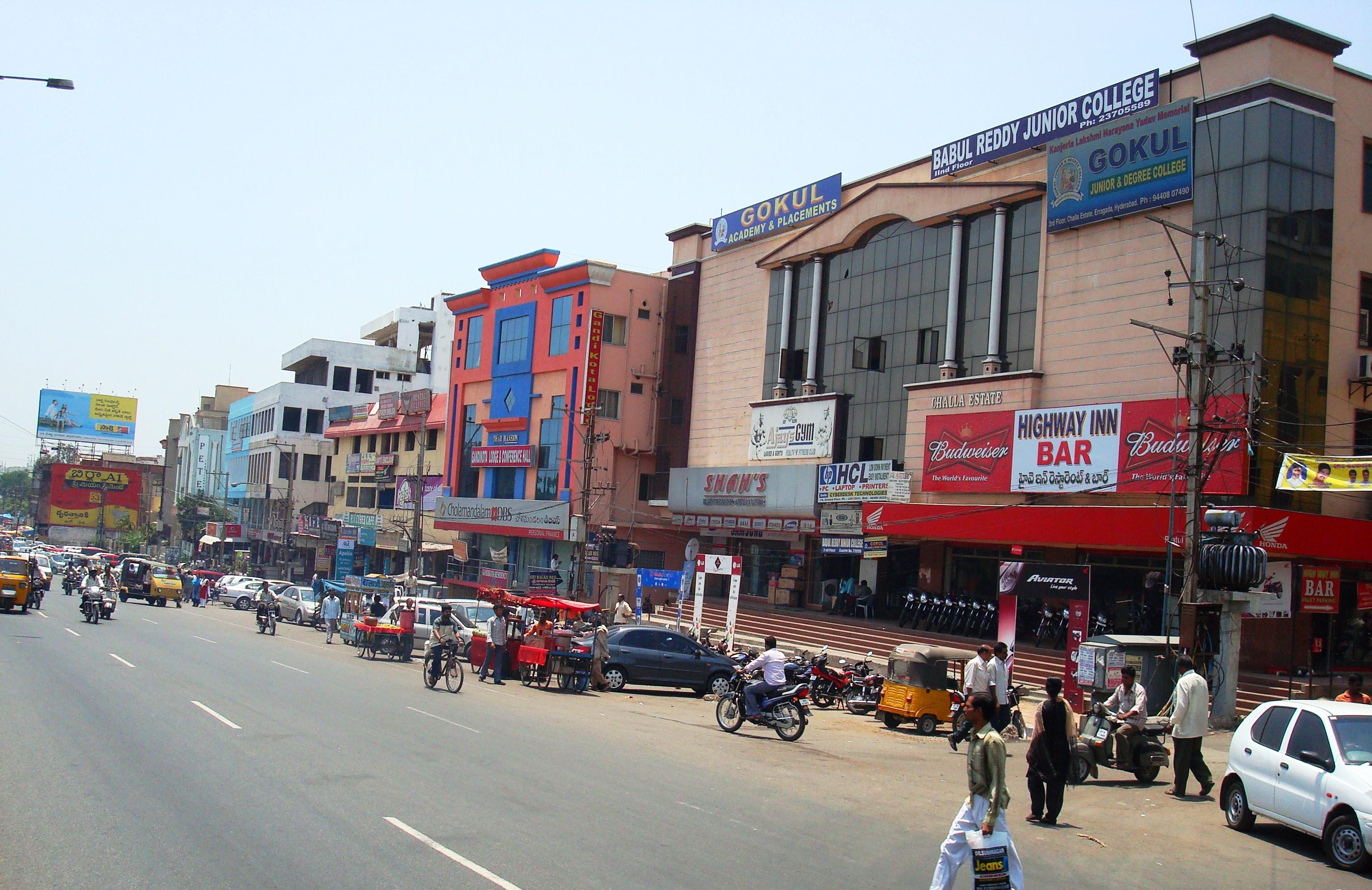
- Erragadda main road

- Location in Telangana, India Erragadda (Telangana) Erragadda (India)
- Coordinates: 17°29′N 78°25′E
- Country: India
- State: Telangana
- District: Hyderabad
- Metro: Hyderabad Metropolitan Development Authority

Government
  - Body: GHMC

Languages
  - Official: Telugu
- Time zone: UTC+5:30 (IST)
- PIN: 500018
- Vehicle registration: TG
- Lok Sabha constituency: Secunderabad
- Vidhan Sabha constituency: Khairtabad
- Planning agency: GHMC, Hyderabad Metropolitan Development Authority
- Website: telangana.gov.in

Erragadda is a developing commercial and residential area in the west zone of Hyderabad, Telangana, India. It is home to the ECE Industries, an electrical enterprise. Popular landmarks are the Gokul theater and St. Theresa's Hospital which was constructed in the 1980s or 1970s respectively. It is administered as Ward No. 101 of Greater Hyderabad Municipal Corporation. The corporator is shaheen begum.

== Health ==
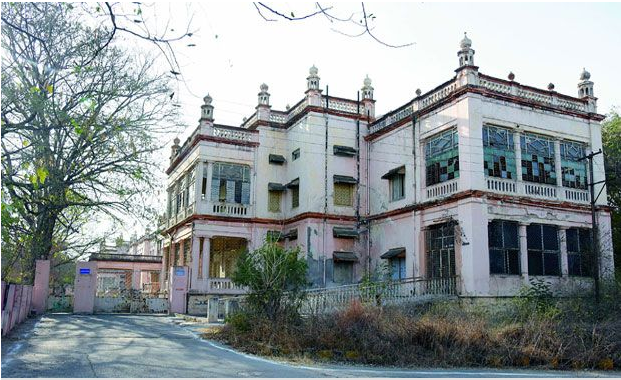
Chest hospital

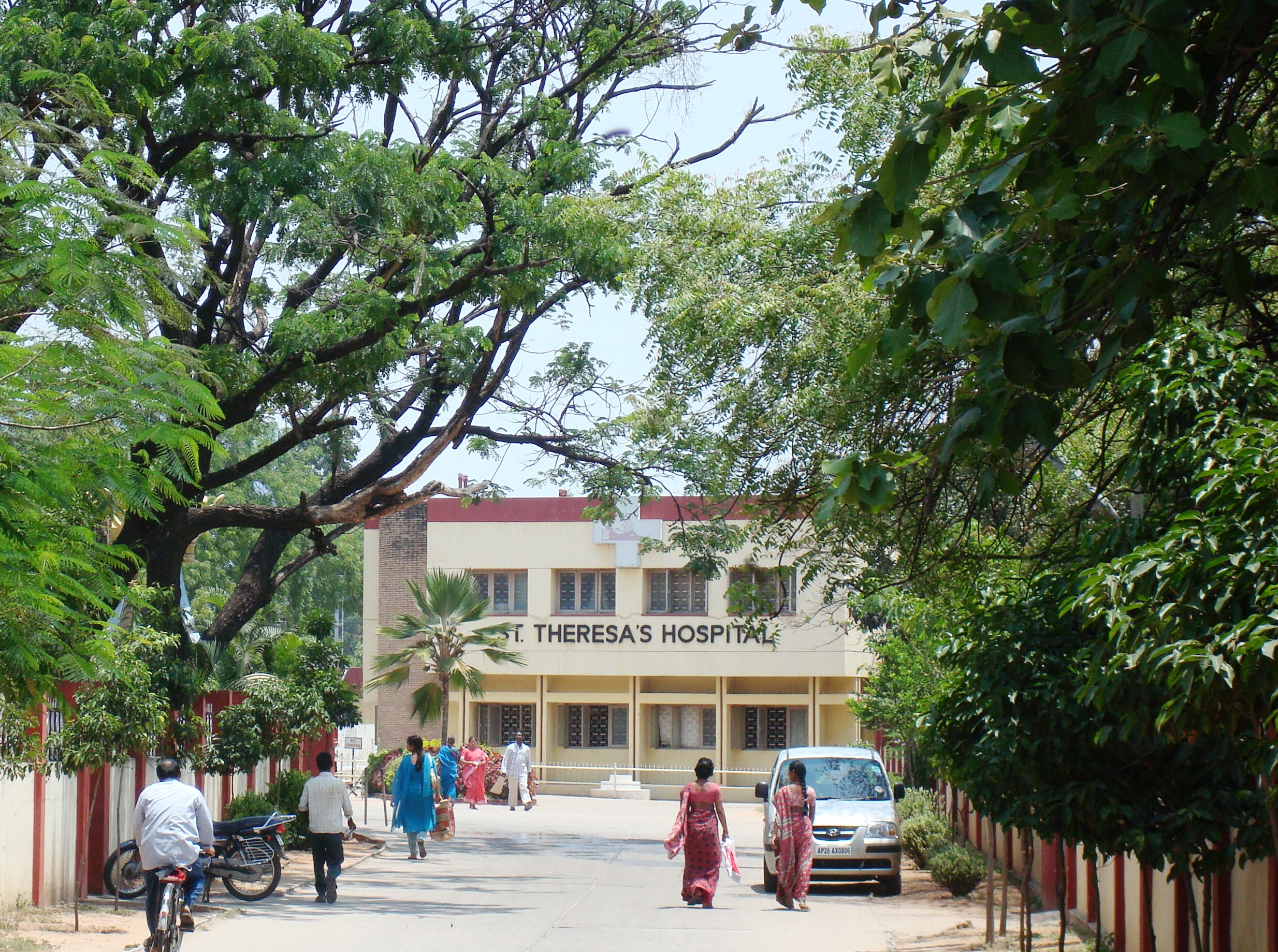
St. Theresa's Hospital

Medical institutions such as the St. Theresa's Hospital, and government institutions such as the Institute of Mental Health, Tuberculosis and Chest hospital are located here.

== Transport ==
Erragadda is well connected by TSRTC buses to all parts of the city. But roads are narrow at junctions as well as lack of proper traffic control causes traffic jams at peak hours.

The nearest MMTS station is located at Bharat nagar, less than half kilometer away.
