= Hyderabad Chloroform Commission =

The Hyderabad Chloroform Commission was commissioned in Hyderabad by the then ruler of Hyderabad State, Mir Mahbub Ali Khan. The first Chloroform Commission was gathered in the year 1888 to assess the toxicity of chloroform when used in humans to allow for painless operations. The second commission was formed in the year 1889. Thus making Hyderabad the first to use the chloroform in a medical field.

Famous Scottish surgeon, Dr Edward Lawrie, Residency Surgeon in Hyderabad, pioneered a technique that he claimed permitted safe and painless operations. The first commission formed at Dr. Lawrie's request to evaluate his technique. The commission's findings were published in The Lancet in 1890. In 1891, the book Report of the Hyderabad Chloroform Commission was published by the Nizam's government.

In 1988, Osmania General Hospital celebrated the centenary of the Hyderabad Chloroform Commissions.
