= Falaknuma–Lingampalli route =

Falaknama–Lingampalli Line

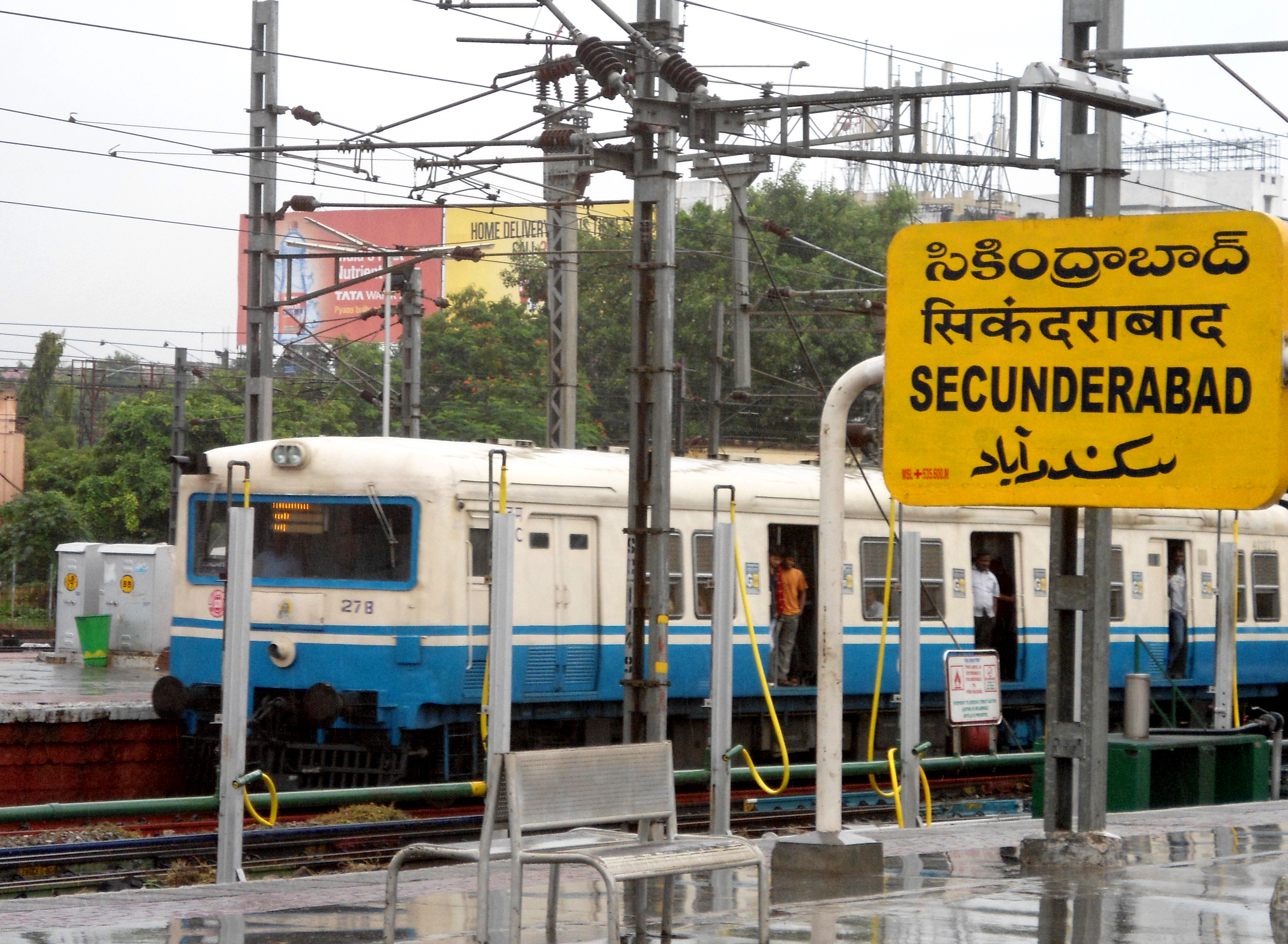
- An MMTS train to Lingampalli enters Secunderabad railway station in 2013

Overview
- Owner: Government of Telangana; Indian Railways
- Termini: Falaknuma; Lingampalli
- Stations: 22

Service
- Type: Rapid transit
- System: Hyderabad Multi-Modal Transport System
- Operator: South Central Railway

History
- Opened: 2003

Technical
- Number of tracks: 2
- Character: Surface
- Track gauge: 1,676 mm (5 ft 6 in) (broad gauge)
- Electrification: Direct current traction
Route map
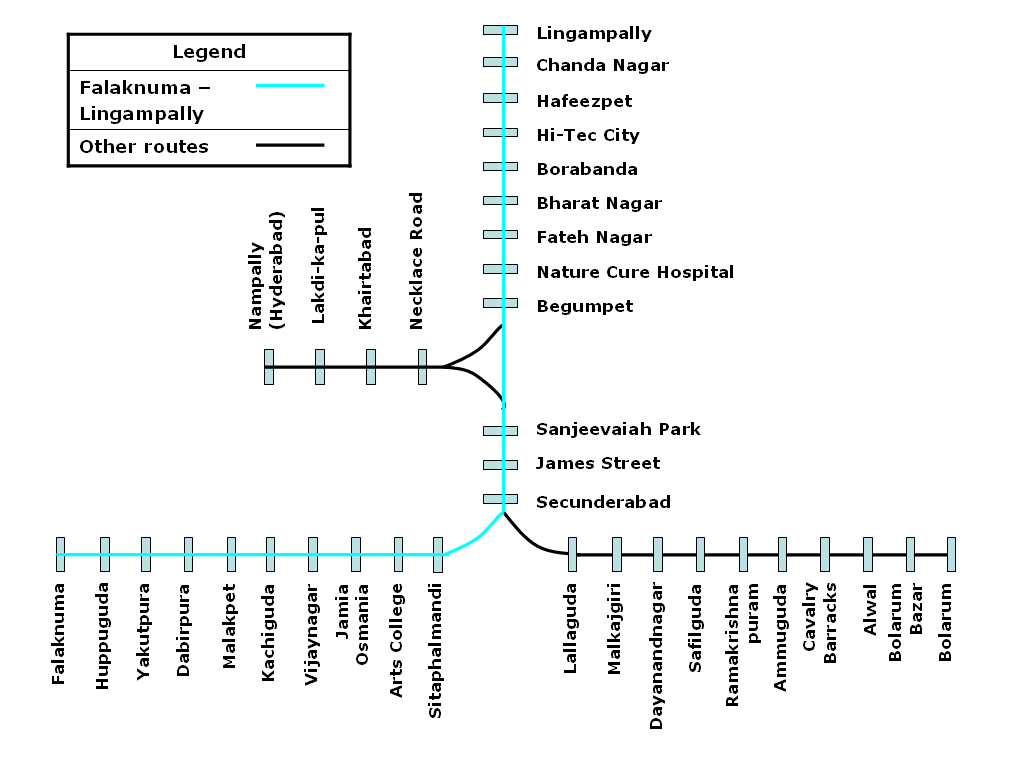

The Falaknuma - Lingampalli route (FL) is a rapid transit service of the Multi-Modal Transport System of Hyderabad, India. Spanning 17 stations, it runs between Falaknuma and Lingampalli 15 times a day.

== Stations ==
Falaknuma–Lingampalli
Station Code	Station Name	Connections
FM	Falaknuma	
HPG	Huppuguda	
YKA	Yakutpura	
DQR	Dabirpura	
MXT	Malakpet	Malakpet metro station
KCG	Kachiguda	
VAR	Vidyanagar	
JOO	Jamia Osmania	
ATC	Arts College	
STPD	Sitaphalmandi	
SC	Secunderabad	Secunderabad East metro station, Secunderabad West metro station
JET	James Street	
SJVP	Sanjeevaiah Park	
BMT	Begumpet	Begumpet metro station
NCHS	Nature Cure	
FNB	Fateh Nagar	
BTNR	Bharat Nagar	Bharat Nagar metro station
BRBD	Borbanda	
HTCY	Hi-Tech City	
HFZ	Hafeezpet	
CDNR	Chanda Nagar	
LPI	Lingampalli	
