= Hyderabad–Falaknuma route =

Railway line in India

Hyderabad–Falaknuma Line

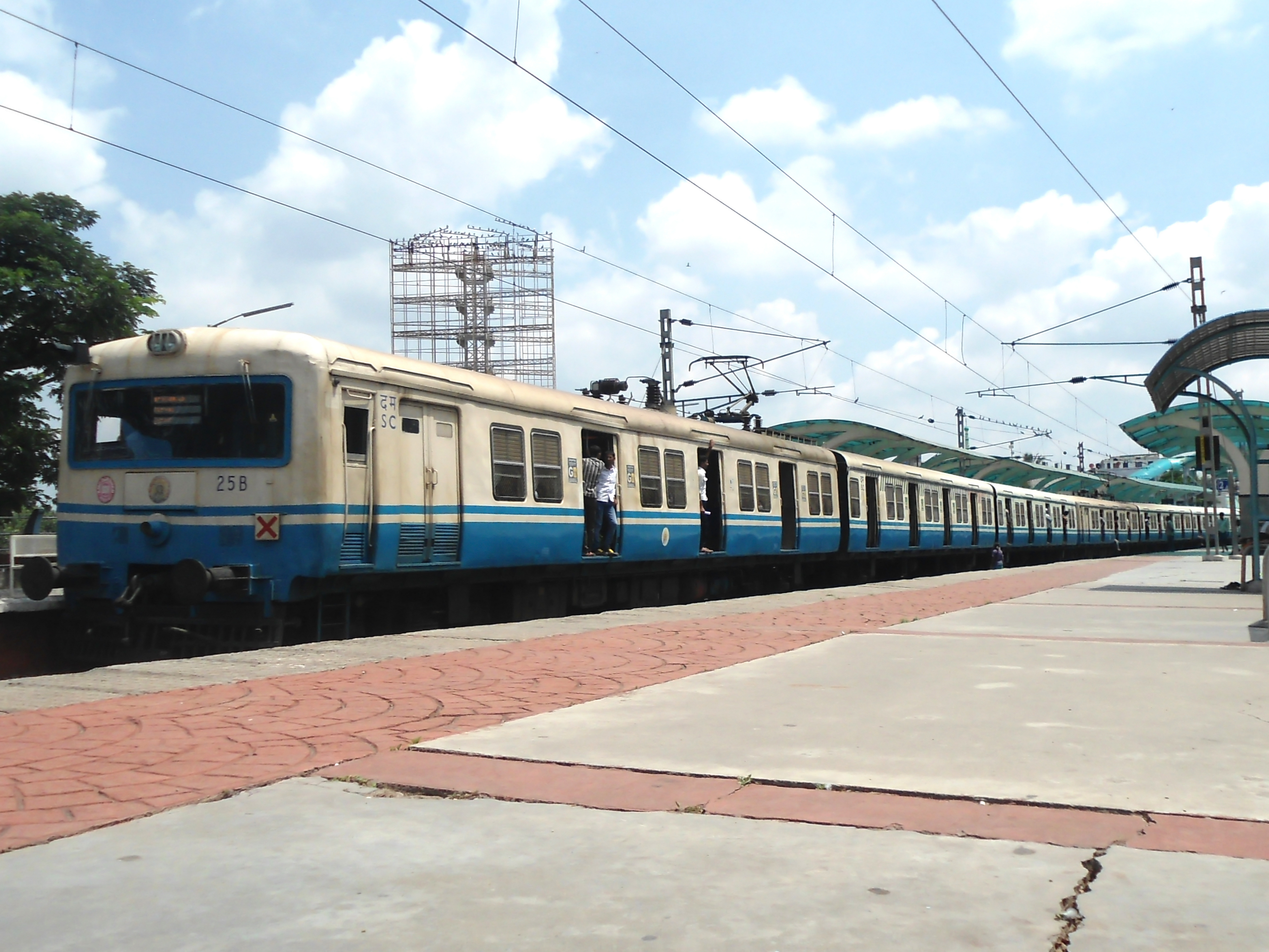
- A Hyderabad bound MMTS Local at Necklace Road Station in 2013

Overview
- Owner: Government of Telangana; Indian Railways
- Termini: Hyderabad; Falaknuma
- Stations: 17

Service
- Type: Rapid transit
- System: Hyderabad Multi-Modal Transport System
- Operator: South Central Railway

History
- Opened: 2003

Technical
- Number of tracks: 2
- Character: Surface
- Track gauge: 4 ft 8 1/2 in (1,435 mm)
- Electrification: Direct current traction
Route map
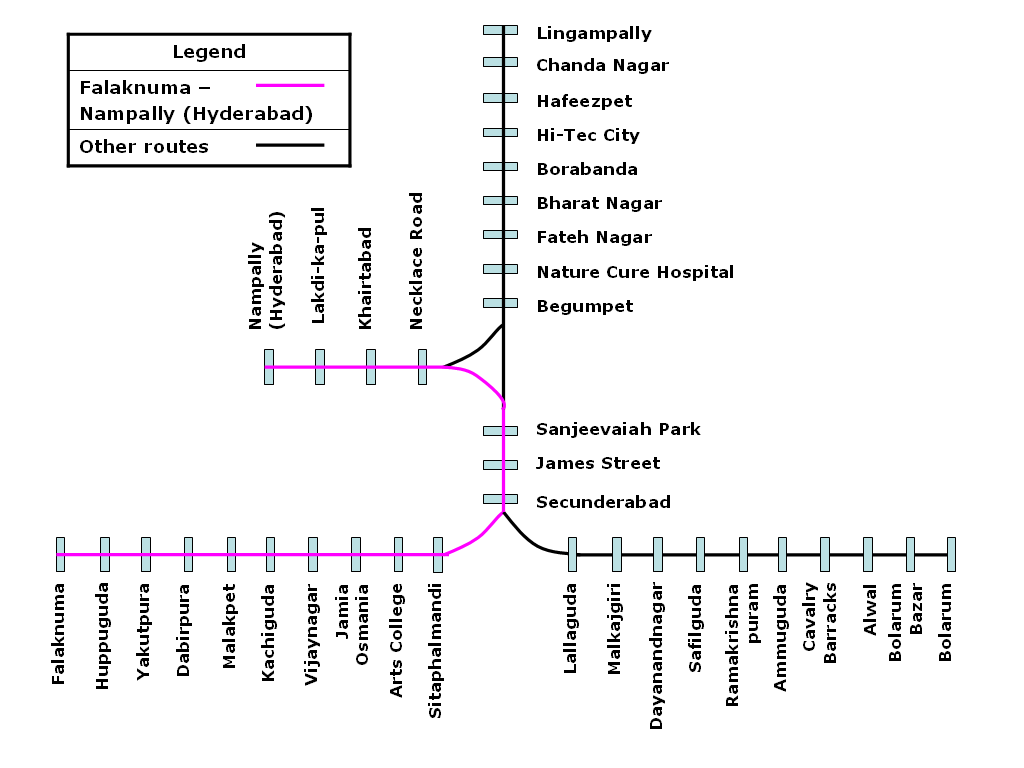

The Hyderabad–Falaknuma route (HF) is a rapid transit service of the Multi-Modal Transport System of Hyderabad, India. Spanning 17 stations, it runs between Nampally (Hyderabad) and Falaknuma three times daily. It caters many residents of the locality including those visiting the Falaknuma palace.

== Stations ==
Hyderabad–Falaknuma
Station Code	Station Name	Connections
HYB	Hyderabad	Nampally Metro Station
LKPL	Lakdi-ka-pul	Lakdi-ka-pul metro station
KQD	Khairtabad	Khairatabad metro station
NLRD	Necklace Road	
SJVP	Sanjeevaiah Park	
JET	James Street	
SC	Secunderabad	Secunderabad East metro station, Secunderabad West metro station
STPD	Sitaphalmandi	
ATC	Arts College	
JOO	Jamia Osmania	
VAR	Vidyanagar	
KCG	Kachiguda	
MXT	Malakpet	Malakpet metro station
DQR	Dabirpura	
YKA	Yakutpura	
HPG	Huppuguda	
FM	Falaknuma	
