= Bagh Lingampally =

- Neighbourhood
- Location in Hyderabad, India Bagh Lingampally (India)
- Coordinates: 17.39918°N 78.49757°E
- Country: India
- State: Telangana
- District: Hyderabad
- City: Hyderabad

Government
  - Body: GHMC

Languages
  - Official: Telugu
- Time zone: UTC+5:30 (IST)
- PIN: 500 044
- Vehicle registration: TG
- Lok Sabha constituency: Hyderabad
- Vidhan Sabha constituency: Himayatnagar
- Planning agency: GHMC

Bagh Lingampally is a commercial and residential neighbourhood of Hyderabad, Telangana, India. It has become one of the many major centres of Hyderabad. Lingampalli.It was earlier known as Lingampalli Bagh, which contained a royal palace with a compound of 55 acres, with 130 acres around it. Lingampalli Bagh was given as a wedding present by the 5th Nizam, Nawab Afzal-ud-Dowla Bahadur when his daughter Shehzadi Haseen unnisa married Nawab Khursheed Jah Bahadur, H.E. Paigah Amir Nawab Sir Khursheed Jah Bahadur, the second greatest Paigah nobleman of Hyderabad Deccan. A little portion of the palace remains today...in what is Ambedkar College inside Lingampalli Bagh. The bagh was acquired by the Housing Board A.P., in the sixties. Furthermore, the palace had a tunnel leading to Golconda Fort. This was a property belonging to the Nizams and was given to Haseen Unnisa Begum, wife of Sir Khursheed Jah, by her father Nawab Afzal-ud-Dowla, Asaf Jah V, at the time of her wedding. She was also the sister of H.H Nawab Mahboob Ali Khan, Asaf Jah VI. This locality was also home to one of the Nobility of Hyderabad, Khan Bahadur Abdulkareem Lal Khan, Former Kotwal (Commissioner of Police and Finance Minister until 1911) in the 7th Nizams Government. This area used to be full of fruit gardens belonging to them, from where the prefix ‘Bagh' (meaning garden) is derived. The place had a small village called Lingampally which had a tank where queens would bathe. The locality has gained importance due to its proximity to RTC X Roads, Chikkadpally, Barkatpura, Himayathnagar, Nallakunta and Koti. This suburb is a mixture of the Old and New City cultures of Hyderabad. There is a vegetable market on Saturdays.

== Commercial ==
Bagh Lingampally has a multitude of shops throughout the stretch with numerous chat bandars, fast food centers, bakeries, tea stalls, pan shops, juice centers and restaurants.

== Transportation ==
Bagh Lingampally is connected by TSRTC buses with a Bus depot located there. There is a MMTS train station at Kachiguda and Vidyanagar. This place also contains travel agencies.

== Educational institutions ==
Baghlingampally is home to reputable educational institutions such as Nrupatunga Junior and Degree College, Dr. B.R. Ambedkar's institution Specialized in Law & Management Studies and other institutions like St. Gabriel's, Gowtham Model School also exist.

== Cultural hub ==
This suburb is rich in culture. It contains various temples (Sri Anjaneyaswamy Temple and Sri SaiBaba Temple) and auditoriums (Sundarayya Vignana Kendram). Sundarya Park is considered a local landmark of this suburb. Sarojini Cricket Academy is considered one of the best cricket coaching academies in Hyderabad.

== Future developments ==
There is a prdoposal from the TSHB to construct a multi storied township on the site of the Housing Board Flats. The current owners would receive a flat in the proposed development. There are proposals for constructing malls in the area.

== Distance to key locations ==
Imliban Bus Stand - 3 km Jubilee Bus Stand - 5.2 km Secunderabad Station - 3.6 km Panjagutta X Roads - 5.6 km Kukatpally HB - 14.9 km Begumpet Airport - 5.9 km Trimulgherry RTA - 7.3 km Madhapur (Cyber Towers) - 12.9 km Dilsukhnagar - 4.6 km
