= Hyderabad–Lingampalli route =

Hyderabad–Lingampalli Line

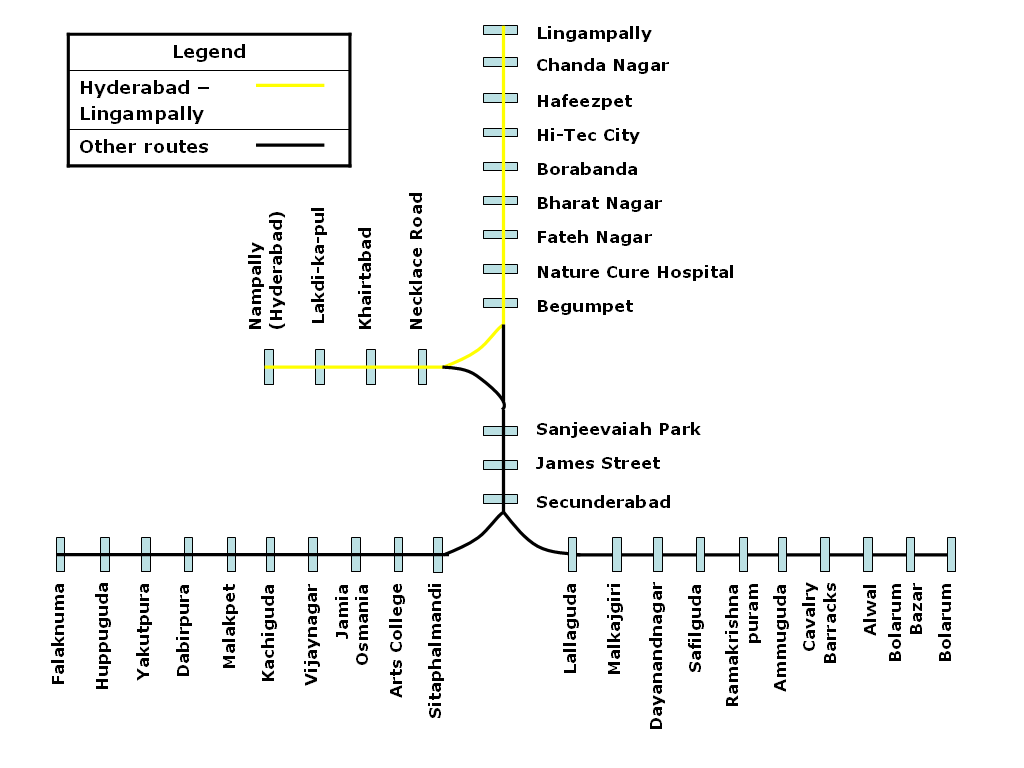
- Route between Hyderabad Deccan and Lingampalli

Overview
- Owner: Government of Telangana; Indian Railways
- Termini: Hyderabad; Lingampalli
- Stations: 13

Service
- Type: Rapid transit
- System: Hyderabad Multi-Modal Transport System
- Operator: South Central Railway

History
- Opened: 2003

Technical
- Number of tracks: 2
- Character: Surface
- Track gauge: 4 ft 8 1/2 in (1,435 mm)
- Electrification: Direct current traction

The Hyderabad–Lingampalli route (HL) is a rapid transit service of the Multi-Modal Transport System of Hyderabad, India. Spanning 13 stations, it runs between Hyderabad and Lingampalli 24 times a day.

== Stations ==
Hyderabad–Lingampalli
Station Code	Station Name	Connections
HYB	Hyderabad	Nampally Metro Station
LKPL	Lakdi-ka-pul	Lakdi-ka-pul metro station
KQD	Khairtabad	Khairatabad metro station
NLRD	Necklace Road	
BMT	Begumpet	Begumpet metro station
NCHS	Nature Cure	
FNB	Fatehnagar	
BTNR	Bharat Nagar	Bharat Nagar metro station
BRBD	Borbanda	
HTCY	Hi-Tech City	
HFZ	Hafeezpet	
CDNR	Chanda Nagar	
LPI	Lingampalli	
