= Lal Darwaza =

- Walled City
- Interactive map of Lal Darwaza
- Country: India
- State: Telangana
- District: Hyderabad
- Metro: Hyderabad

Government
  - Body: GHMC

Languages
  - Official: Telugu, Urdu
- Time zone: UTC+5:30 (IST)
- PIN: 500 053
- Vehicle registration: TG
- Lok Sabha constituency: Hyderabad
- Vidhan Sabha constituency: Chandrayangutta
- Planning agency: GHMC
- Website: telangana.gov.in

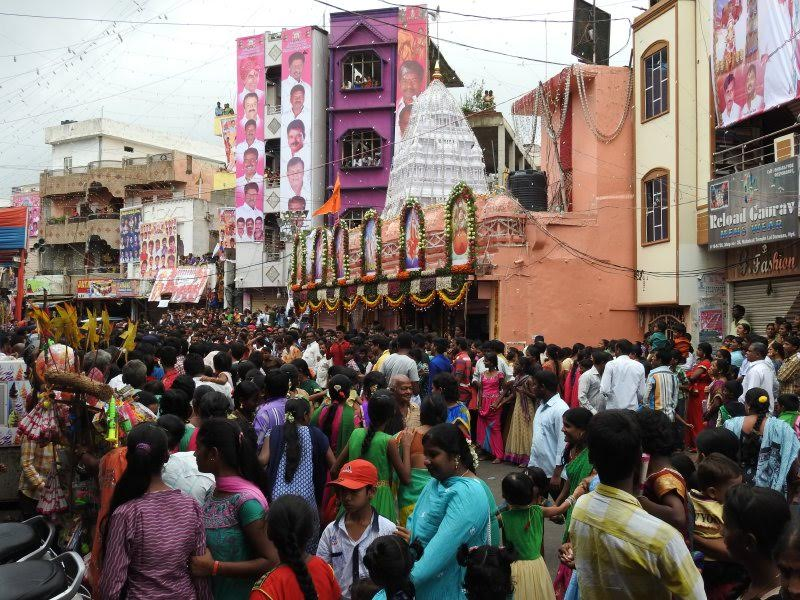
Bonalu celebrations at Lal Darwaza in 2016

Lal Darwaza (Red Gate) is one of the old neighbourhoods or Inner City in Hyderabad, India.

== History ==
Lal Darwaza was built in 1907. A large red door at the entrance to this suburb was named Lal darwaza (Red Door) during the time of the Nizams. The founder and Local leader venkataswamy mudhiraj who organiser of bonalu festival proposed to develop the temple Maharaja Sir Kishen Pershad who served as Prime Minister of Nizam government, started the Bonalu Festival under organisation of venkataswamy mudhiraj Nizam of Hyderabad Mir Mahbub Ali Khan gave donations and land to this and many other temples.

== Culture ==
Bonala Jathara ("Procession" in English) at Lal Darwaza is considered the biggest cultural festival in Telangana.

== Geography ==
It is a kilometer from Charminar (1.5 km), Koti (4 km), Afzalgunj (3 km), CBS (Central Bus Station-IMLIBAN) (3 km), Chandrayangutta (1.5 km), Uppuguda (0.5 km) With the surroundings Aliyabad, Chatrinaka, Gowlipura, Rajannabai, Shah-Ali-Banda.

Earlier a Sufi Dargah with a writing engraved "Pather ki Dargha" ("Stone Mausoleum" in English) was found in Lal Darwaza.

== Commercial area ==
Many shops are present. A movie theater Sudha 70MM; now known as Cinepolis is located there.

== Transport ==
Lal Darwaza is connected to other towns by TSRTC buses. A Bus Depot is nearby. The closest MMTS is at Uppuguda.
