= Hyderabad Multi-Modal Transport System =

Transport system of Hyderabad, India

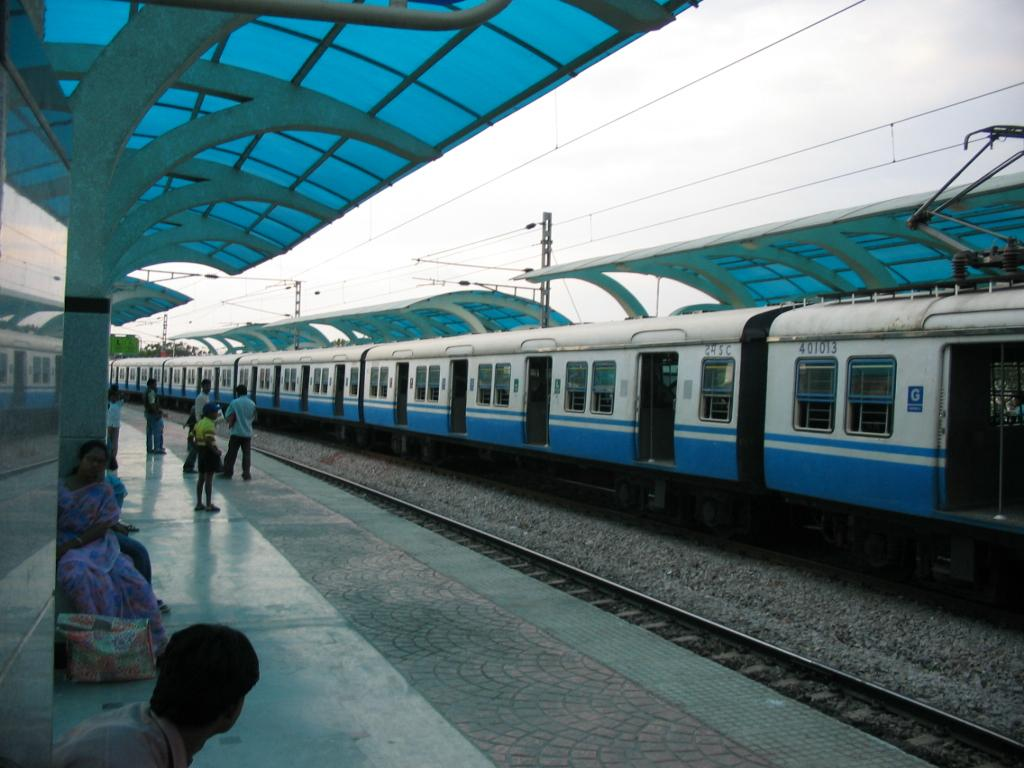
- MMTS at Necklace Road Station

Overview
- Owner: Government of Telangana; South Central Railway
- Locale: Hyderabad, Telangana, India
- Transit type: Suburban rail
- Number of lines: HF Line; HL Line; FL Line; SF Line; SB Line
- Number of stations: 53
- Daily ridership: 220,000 (Oct 2019) 70,000 (April 2022)

Operation
- Began operation: 9 August 2003; 23 years ago
- Operator: South Central Railway

Technical
- System length: 123.52 kilometers (76.75 mi)
- Track gauge: 5 ft 6 in (1,676 mm) Indian gauge
- Electrification: 25 kV 50 Hz AC overhead line

The Hyderabad Multi-Modal Transport System, commonly abbreviated as MMTS, is a suburban rail system in Hyderabad, India. A joint venture of the Government of Andhra Pradesh (now the Government of Telangana) and the South Central Railway, it is operated by the latter. The 90-kilometre (56 mi) system caters to the city of Hyderabad and the neighbouring suburban areas connecting Hyderabad, Secunderabad, Falaknuma, Lingampally, Medchal and Umdanagar with a total of 133 MMTS services. As on Dec 2025, around 80 MMTS services are operated carrying nearly 60,000 passengers a day. The trains operated has a maximum of 12 coaches with first class and ordinary class categories. The drop in train services occurred as a result of COVID-19 and has not been completely restored.

== History ==
The Hyderabad MMTS project was conceived as a joint venture between the Government of India and the Government of Andhra Pradesh with a MoU signed in September 2000. The planning and commencement of the work was inaugurated by the then Chief Minister of Andhra Pradesh, N. Chandrababu Naidu. The first phase was inaugurated on 9 August 2003 by then Deputy Prime Minister of India, L. K. Advani at Bhoiguda. The system initially consisted of three lines, with total length of 44 kilometres (27 mi). In May 2010, Indian Railways decided to take over the 104 kilometres (65 mi) as part of Phase II at an estimated cost of ₹ 641 crore. The Railway Board cleared the approval of the second phase after the state government agreed to fund two-thirds of the project cost.

Although Phase-II was scheduled to operate by 2018, it was delayed due to various reasons and was finally opened on 8 April 2023 20 years after Phase-I by the Prime Minister, Narendra Modi at Secunderabad Junction after the operation of a smaller stream in 2019.

== Phase-I ==
The first phase was completed at a cost of ₹1.62 billion (US$22 million), and it was inaugurated on 9 August 2003 by Deputy Prime Minister of India, L. K. Advani. The project complements the city's rapid growth in information technology, biotechnology, health, aviation and tourism. This phase was completed in two streams, the first stream of MMTS between Hyderabad, Lingampalli and Secunderabad with a distance of 29 kilometres (18 mi) covering 17 stations. The second steam of MMTS between Secunderabad and Falaknuma, covering a distance of 15 kilometres (9.3 mi) with 11 stations was completed the next year, inaugurated on 14 February 2004, totalling the number of stations to 27 with Secunderabad being the biggest interchange of the 44-kilometre (27 mi) network. The network also consists of the coverage of other areas such as Bolarum towards Manoharabad and Umdanagar which was not completely integrated into the MMTS network. Although many other routes and stations were available, the process of electrification of these other routes were included in the Phase-II.

== Phase-II ==
In May 2010, Indian Railways decided to adopt the MMTS 104-kilometre (65 mi) Phase II project at an estimated cost of ₹ 641 crore. The Railway Board approved the second phase after the state government agreed to fund two-thirds of its cost. It was expected to be completed by 2018, and will handle 300,000 passengers a day as per the estimates back then. A 6-kilometre (3.7 mi) stretch from Lingampally to R. C. Puram and a 12.5-kilometre (7.8 mi) stretch from Bolaram to Medchal was scheduled to begin in March 2018, and the 12-kilometre (7.5 mi) Moula Ali–Ghatkesar stretch was scheduled to open in July 2018 but it was delayed due to several reasons. Regardless of the delay trial runs started on few sections of phase 2 in August 2020. Quadrupling 4 lines with electrification and installation of Automatic block signaling in the existing double line between Ghatkesar and Moula Ali, doubling and electrification between Falaknuma and Umdanagar in the southern part of city; Doubling and electrification between Moula Ali and Sitafalmandi, connecting Malkajgiri and doubling with electrification between Moula Ali and Sanathnagar along with construction of 5 new stations in the section for providing east-west connectivity bypassing Secunderabad station. The six new stations are built Moula Ali-Sanathnagar line.

The Phase II was stalled for over a decade owing to lack of funds. The Union Government allocated ₹ 600 crore as part of the Union budget (2023-24) towards it for resumption of phase II works. Over time, the sanctioned cost has been escalated to ₹ 1,150 crores.

On 9 June 2019 as part of the Phase II project the first stream between Tellapur and R. C. Puram with a distance of 6-kilometre was started and opened for the public.

On 8 April 2023 13 MMTS services along with 2 other routes under the MMTS Phase II between Secunderabad Bolarum Medchal with a distance of 28-kilometre along with the extension from Falaknuma to Umdanagar with a distance of 12-kilometre was inaugurated by the Prime Minister Narendra Modi totalling to 90-kilometre and 44 stations under the MMTS project.

=== Segments ===
Route	Distance	Status
Secunderabad – Bolarum – Medchal	28 kilometers (17 mi)	Operational
Falaknuma – Umdanagar – Shamshabad Airport	20 kilometers (12 mi)	Partly operational 12 kilometers (7.5 mi)
Secunderabad – Moulali – Ghatkesar	19 kilometers (12 mi)	Work in progress
Moulali – Sanathnagar	22 kilometers (14 mi)	Operational
Kacheguda – Sitaphalmandi – Malkajgiri – Moulali	10 kilometers (6.2 mi)	Work in progress

== Stations ==
Hyderabad MMTS
Station name		Station code	Service area
English	Telugu	Station code	Service area
Secunderabad Junction	సికింద్రాబాద్ జంక్షన్	SC	Marredpally, Patny, Karkhana
James Street	జేమ్స్ స్ట్రీట్	JET	MG Road, Paradise, Rani Gunj, Minister Road, Hussain Sagar
Sanjeevaiah Park	సంజీవయ్య పార్క్	SJVP	Necklace Road, Minister Road, MG Road, Pattigadda
Begumpet	బేగంపేట	BMT	Ameerpet, Greenlands, Somajiguda, Panjagutta, Banjara Hills, Brahmanwadi
Nature Cure Hospital	నేచర్ క్యూర్ హాస్పిటల్	NCHS	Balkampet, Ameerpet, Sanjeeva Reddy Nagar
Fateh Nagar	ఫతే నగర్	FNB	Balanagar, Sanathnagar, Yellamma Gudi
Bharat Nagar	భరత్ నగర్	BTNR	Moosapet, Kukatpally, Nizampet, Sanathnagar, Erragadda, Mothinagar, ESI Hospital
Borabanda	బోరబండ	BRBD	Allapur, Gayatrinagar, Tulasinagar, Mothi Nagar, Rajeev Nagar, Erragadda
Hi-Tech City	హైటెక్ సిటీ	HTCY	Kukatpally Housing Board (KPHB) colony, Izzat Nagar, Madhapur, JNTU
Hafizpet	హఫీజ్‌పేట	HFZ	Madhapur, Kondapur, Miyapur
Chandanagar	చందానగర్	CDNR	Chandanagar, Madinaguda
Lingampalli	లింగంపల్లి	LPI	BHEL Township, University of Hyderabad, Gachibowli
Sitaphalmandi	సీతాఫల్ మండి	STPD	EFLU, Tarnaka
Arts College	ఆర్ట్స్ కాలేజీ	ATC	Osmania University, Warasiguda, Adikmet, Manikeswari Nagar
Jamia Osmania	జామియా ఉస్మానియా	JOO	Barkatpura, Ramnagar
Vidyanagar	విద్యానగర్	VAR	Shanker Mutt, RTC X Roads, Chikkadpally, Shivam Road, Tilaknagar, Amberpet
Kachiguda	కాచిగూడ	KCG	Barkatpura, Chaderghat, Narayanguda, Koti, Abids
Malakpet	మలక్ పేట	MXT	Chaderghat, Nalgonda 'X' Roads, Dilsukhnagar, Kothapet, Charminar
Dabirpura	డబీర్‌పురా	DQB	Chanchalguda, Saidabad, Printing Press, Purani Haveli, Dar-ul-Shifa, Mir Alam Mandi, Salar Jung Museum
Yakutpura	యాకుత్ పురా	YKA	Saidabad, Santosh Nagar, Madannapet, Pisal Banda, Rein Bazar, Edi Bazar, Brahman Vaadi, Bada Bazaar
Huppuguda	హప్పుగూడ	HPG	Lal Darwaza, Aliabad, Shalibanda, Jahanuma, Charminar
Falaknuma	ఫలక్‌నుమా	FM	Udden Gadda, Chandrayan Gutta, Barkas
Umdanagar	ఉమ్దానగర్	UN	Shamshabad
Hyderabad	హైదరాబాద్	HYB	Nampally, Salar Jung Museum, Hyderguda, Abids, Moazzam Jahi Market, Devi Bagh, Criminal Courts
Lakdi-ka-pul	లక్డీ-కా-పుల్	LKPL	Saifabad, Red Hills, Public gardens, Masab Tank, Niloufer Hospital
Khairtabad	ఖైరతాబాద్	KQD	Banjara Hills, Raj Bhavan Road, Panjagutta, Chintal Basti
Necklace Road	నెక్లెస్ రోడ్	NLRD	Raj Bhavan Road, Somajiguda, Panjagutta
Lallaguda	లల్లాగూడ	LGDH	Lallaguda, Malkajgiri, Shantinagar, Tukaram Gate
Malkajgiri	మల్కాజిగిరి	MJF	Malkajgiri, Anandbagh, Hanumanpet, Mirjalguda
Dayanandnagar	దయానందనగర్	DYE	Vaninagar, Mallikarjunnagar, RK Nagar
Safilguda	సఫిల్ గూడ	SFX	Safilguda, Vinayak Nagar, Sainadapuram
Ramakrishnapuram Gate	రామకృష్ణాపురం గేట్	RKO	Neredmet, Kakatiya Nagar
Ammuguda	అమ్ముగూడ	AMQ	Sainikpuri
Cavalry Barracks	కెవలరి బ్యారక్స్	CVB	Lothkunta
Alwal	అల్వాల్	ALW	Alwal
Bolarum Bazar	బోలారం బజార్	BOZ	Macha Bollaram
Bolarum	బొలారం	BMO	Risala Bazar, Hakimpet, Kompally
Moula Ali HB Colony	మౌల అలీ హెచ్ బి కాలనీ	MACH	Moula Ali
Neredmet	నేరేడ్మెట్	NDMH	Neredmet, Kakatiya Nagar, Vinayak Nagar
Bhudevi Nagar	భూదేవి నగర్	BDNH	Alwal
Suchitra Centre	సుచిత్ర సెంటర్	SACH	Suchitra Circle
Ferozguda	ఫిరోజ్ గూడా	FZGH	Ferozguda, Balanagar

== Routes and operations ==
=== MMTS routes ===
Stream	Route	Distance	Stations	Operational (date of inauguration)
Phase-I
Stream 1	Lingampalli – Hyderabad – Secunderabad Junction	29 kilometers (18 mi)	17	9 August 2003
Stream 2	Secunderabad Junction – Falaknuma	15 kilometers (9.3 mi)	10	14 February 2004
Phase-II
Stream 1	Lingampalli – Tellapur – Ramchandrapuram	6 kilometers (3.7 mi)	3	9 June 2019
Stream 2	Secunderabad Junction – Bolarum – Medchal	28 kilometers (17 mi)	11	8 April 2023
Stream 2	Falaknuma – Umdanagar	12 kilometers (7.5 mi)	3	8 April 2023
Stream 3	Moulali – Sanathnagar	22 kilometers (14 mi)	9	5 March 2024

=== MMTS lines ===
- HF Line
- HL Line
- FL Line
- SF Line
- SB Line

(Note: The line colors represented here are unofficial. They serve the purpose of differentiation only.)

== Services ==
=== MMTS services ===
MMTS route	Name	Services
Hyderabad–Lingampalli	HL	11
Lingampalli–Hyderabad	LH	11
Hyderabad–Falaknuma	HF	3
Falaknuma–Hyderabad	FH	3
Falaknuma–Lingampalli	FL	12
Lingampalli–Falaknuma	LF	12
Secunderabad–Falaknuma/Umdanagar	SF, SU	1, 1
Umdanagar/Falaknuma–Secunderabad	FS, US	1, 1
Secunderabad–Lingampalli	SL	2
Hyderabad–R. C. Puram	RH	1
Falaknuma–R. C. Puram	FR	1
R. C. Puram–Falaknuma	RF	1
Secunderabad–Medchal	SM	4
Medchal-Secunderabad	MS	4

=== Suburban services ===
Suburban route	Name	Services
Secunderabad–Hyderabad	SH	2
Secunderabad–Manoharabad	SMB	2
Manoharabad–Secunderabad	MBS	2
Malkajgiri–Bolaram	MJB	1
Secunderabad–Malkajgiri	SMJ	1
Falaknuma–Umdanagar	FU	1
Umdanagar–Falaknuma	UF	1
Moula Ali–Kacheguda/Falaknuma		1, 2
Falaknuma–Bhuvanagiri(BG)	FB	1, 1
Falaknuma–Jangaon	FM-ZN	1
Jangaon–Falaknuma	ZN-FM	1

== Future ==
Following are the proposed and possible expansions to integrate the routes and lines into the MMTS network.

Future expansion
Line	Terminal		Length	Year
MT 08	Ghatkesar	Raigir(Yadadri)	33 km (21 mi)	2021
MT 09	Umdanagar	Shadnagar	31 km (19 mi)	2021-2031
MT 10	Medchal	Topran	21 km (13 mi)	2021-2031
MT 11	Tellapur	Ravullapalli	21 km (13 mi)	2021-2031
MT 12	Topran	Ramayanpet	34 km (21 mi)	2031-2041
MT 13	Raigir(Yadadri)	Jangaon	32 km (20 mi)	2031-2041
MT14	Shadnagar	Jedcherla	24 km (15 mi)	2031-2041
MT 15	Ravullapalli	Vikarabad	24 km (15 mi)	2031-2041
MT 16	Bibinagar	Nalgonda	72 km (45 mi)	2041

== Milestones ==
- On International Women's Day 2012, S. Satyavati was South Central Railway's first female driver, when she drove the MMTS Matrubhumi Ladies Special Train from Falaknuma to Lingampally.
- HYLITES (Hyderabad Live Train Enquiry System), a mobile app for MMTS station and train inquiries, was introduced.
- UTS (unreserved ticketing system) is an app launched by Indian Railways' subsidiary body CRIS in 2014 to generate or cancel unreserved train tickets, book seasonal tickets, renew passes, and purchase platform tickets. The initiative saves passengers from getting into long queues to take printed card tickets (PCTs) for local train travel or platform visits

== See also ==
- Mumbai Suburban Railway
- Hyderabad Metro
- Bengaluru Commuter Rail
