= Edi Bazar =

- Location in Telangana, India Edi Bazar (Telangana) Edi Bazar (India)
- Coordinates: 17.348918°N 78.493659°E
- Country: India
- State: Telangana
- District: Hyderabad District
- Metro: Hyderabad Metropolitan Development Authority
- Zone: Chandrayangutta

Government
  - Body: GHMC

Languages
  - Official: Deccani Urdu, Telugu
- Time zone: UTC+5:30 (IST)
- PIN: 500023

Edi Bazar is the oldest market place of Hyderabad, in Telangana state, India.

There are many 400-year-old mosques like old construction Charminar built during Nizam's era.

== Commercial area ==
There are many shops in the market. There is a large vegetable market near Edi Bazar at Madannapet. Besides a nearby railway station and bus facility, an international airport is just 20 km away from Edi Bazar. A mosque named Quba Mosque is situated in this locality.

== Transport ==
Some of the nearby localities are Kumar Wadi Colony, Rein Bazar, Moin Bagh, Akber Bagh, Ali Nager, Fatehshah Nager, Mohammed Nagar. There are a lot of mosques in this locality.

TSRTC connects Edi Bazar with all parts of the city from Edi Bazar to Charminar and Phisalbanda.

The closest MMTS Train station is at Yaqutpura.

== Schools ==
Schools in the area include St.Mathews High School, Peace High School, Unique High School, Royal Public School, Government High School, Moral Model High School, and Alberta School

Many other educational institutions are there which offer tuitions and coachings to the students.

== Religious Places ==
masajids in this area are Masjid e Hazrat Shujauddin, Masjid-e-abubakar, masjid e ghousia, masjid-e-ameer hamza, masjid farooq-e-azam, masjid-e-kunain etc, masjid e salheen, masjid e suffah ahle hadees, masjid e hajera ahle hadees.

== Dargahs ==
Dargah of Hazrath Mir Shahjuddin Sahab is located here.
