= Ferozguda =

- Neighbourhood
- Country: India
- State: Telangana
- District: Hyderabad
- Metro: Hyderabad

Government
  - Body: GHMC

Languages
  - Official: Telugu
- Time zone: UTC+5:30 (IST)
- PIN: 500 011
- Lok Sabha constituency: Malkajgiri
- Vidhan Sabha constituency: Kukatpally

Ferozguda is a neighbourhood of Hyderabad. It is located in Medchal district of the Indian state of Telangana. It is under the administration of Balanagar mandal of Malkajgiri revenue division.

== History ==
During Nizam's rule, areas were named based on Hindus and Muslims community names. One of them was Ferozguda.

== Transport ==
Ferozguda is a part of the MMTS Phase-II under construction.
