= Tilaknagar =

- Neighbourhood
- Interactive map of Tilaknagar
- Coordinates: 28°38′N 77°06′E
- Country: India
- State: Telangana
- District: Hyderabad
- Metro: Hyderabad

Government
  - Type: Municipal Corporation
  - Body: GHMC
- Demonym: Hyderabadi

Languages
  - Official: Telugu, Urdu, Hindi
- Time zone: UTC+5:30 (IST)
- PIN: 500044
- Vehicle registration: TS
- Lok Sabha constituency: Secunderabad
- Assembly constituency: Amberpet
- Planning agency: GHMC
- Website: telangana.gov.in

Tilaknagar is a suburb in Hyderabad, Telangana, India. It lies adjacent to the government-run Fever Hospital and railway track. It has a residential and growing commercial area. It also has many schools, medical and grocery stores and a few temples. The City Central Library is located a few km from here.

Several cinemas are at a short distance from here, and show predominantly Telugu (Tollywood) movies.

== Transport ==
Tilaknagar is well connected by TSRTC bus, the frequency of buses is every 5 minutes. The nearest MMTS Train station is at Vidyanagar. The nearest public airport is Rajiv Gandhi International Airport. The nearest Hyderabad Metro is at Chikkadpally metro station.

== Hospitals ==
- Woodlands Hospital
- Tilak Nagar Hospital

== Banks ==
- Union Bank of India formerly known as Andhra Bank
- Allahabad Bank

== Schools ==
- Care model high school
- Medha high school
- St.Hannah's High School
- Indian Academy high School

== Boarding and Lodging ==
- OYO Townhouse White Ridge 112
