= Vidyanagar railway station =

Railway station in Telangana, India

Vidyanagar
- Signboard of Vidyanagar railway station at southern end

General information
- Location: Adikmet; Hyderabad; India
- Coordinates: 17.360°N 78.492°E
- Owner: Indian Railway
- Operator: South Central Railway
- Line: Secunderabad–Falaknuma route
- Platforms: 2
- Tracks: 2

Construction
- Structure type: At grade

Other information
- Station code: VAR
- Zone(s): South Central Railway
- Division(s): Jammu
Location

Vidyanagar railway station is a sub-urban 3 (SG–3) category railway station in the Hyderabad railway division of South Central Railway zone. It lies in the suburbs of Hyderabad in the Indian state of Telangana. Localities like Shanker Mutt, RTC X Roads, Chikkadpally, Shivam Road, Tilaknagar, Adikmet, DD Colony, CE Colony, New Nallakunta, Bagh Amberpet Nallakunta and Amberpet are accessible from this station.

== Lines ==
- Hyderabad Multi-Modal Transport System
- Secunderabad–Falaknuma route (SF Line)
