= Minister Road, Hyderabad =

Minister Road
- neighbourhood
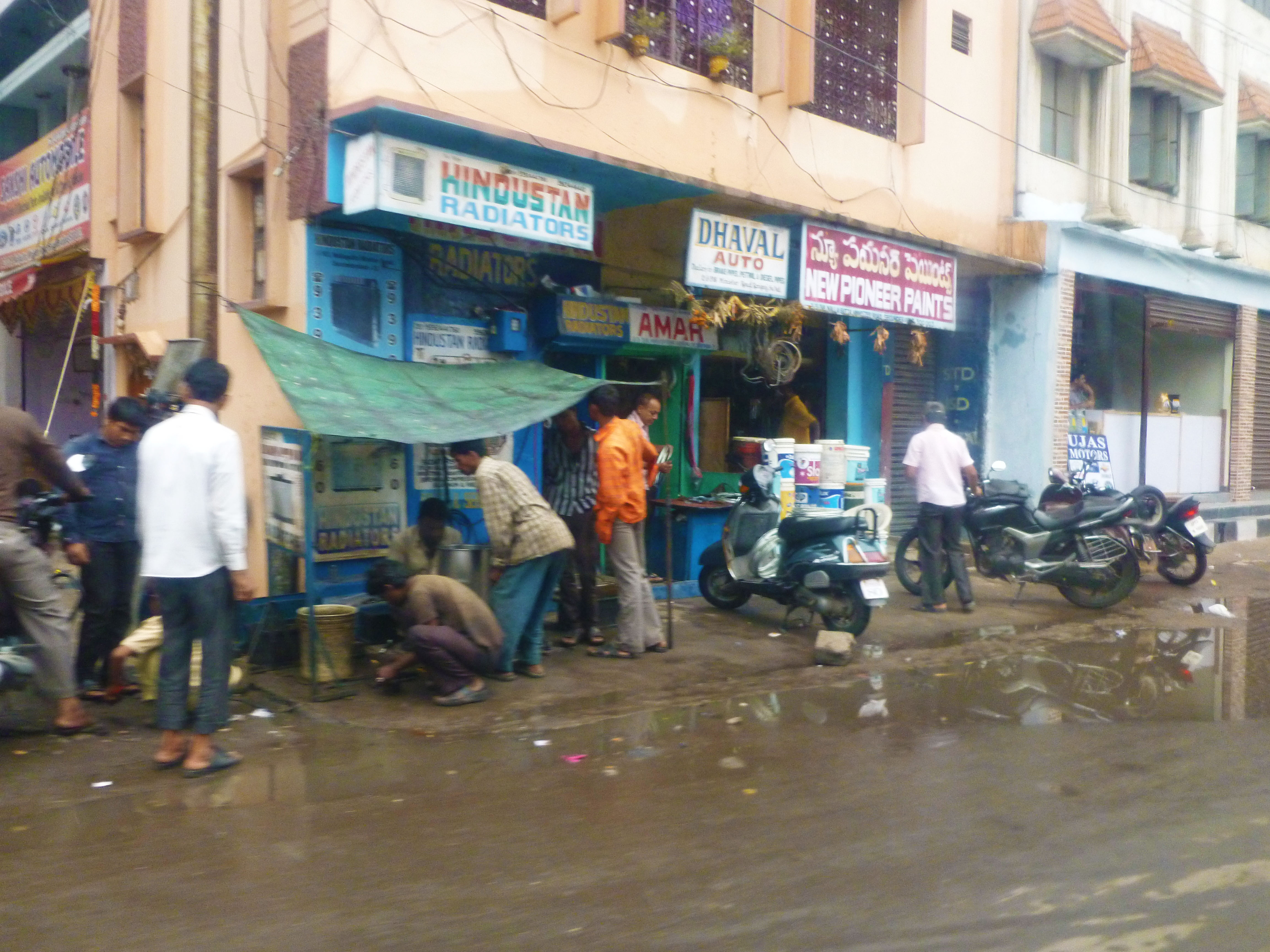
- A view of shops at Minister Road in 2011

- Location in Hyderabad, Telangana, India Minister Road (Telangana) Minister Road (India)
- Coordinates: 17.437310010788587°N 78.4819426282649°E
- Country: India
- State: Telangana
- District: Hyderabad
- Metro: Hyderabad

Government
  - Body: GHMC

Languages
  - Official: Telugu
- Time zone: UTC+5:30 (IST)
- PIN: 500003
- Lok Sabha constituency: Secunderabad
- Vidhan Sabha constituency: Khairtabad
- Planning agency: GHMC

Minister Road is a street in Secunderabad connecting Sardar Patel Road and NH 44. It is very close to Hussain Sagar Lake. The area is the venue of the main automobile spare parts and accessories market in Secunderabad. There are many small shops in the area.

== Transport ==
The closest MMTS train station is at James Street.

The state-owned TSRTC runs the city bus service, connecting to all the major centres of the city.
