= Shanker Mutt =

Shankar Mutt
- Neighbourhood
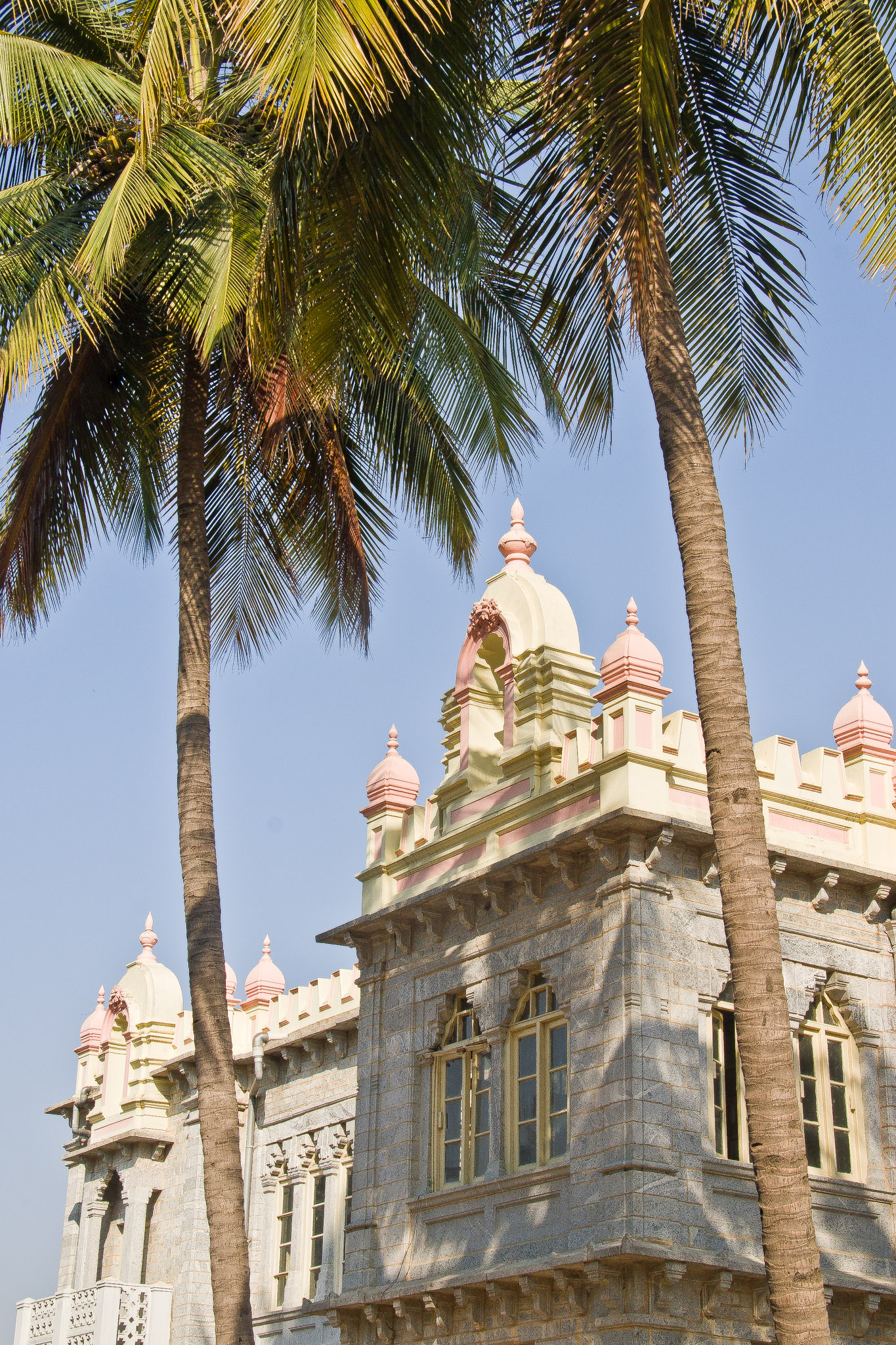
- Country: India
- State: Telangana
- District: Hyderabad
- Metro: Hyderabad

Government
  - Body: GHMC

Languages
  - Official: Telugu
- Time zone: UTC+5:30 (IST)
- PIN: 500 044
- Vehicle registration: TG
- Lok Sabha constituency: Secunderabad Lok Sabha constituency
- Vidhan Sabha constituency: Amberpet Assembly constituency
- Planning agency: GHMC
- Website: telangana.gov.in

Shanker Mutt is a neighbourhood in Nallakunta, Hyderabad, Telangana, India.

== Sringeri Sharadha Peetam ==
The name Shanker Mutt is originated from the temple of Shankara. This mutt is the oldest of the branch maths of the Sringeri Math in Hyderabad.

== Transport ==
Shanker Mutt is well connected by TSRTC buses.

The closest MMTS Train station is at Vidyanagar.

== Schools ==
Schools in the region include Sri Gurudatta High School, which was founded and run by Mr. Sharma, and Gurudatta Coaching Centre run by Mr. Seenu. Shankermutt is a home of many colleges and engineering educational institutions, like Vijaya Ratna Junior College, which also offers foundation based coaching for both IIT aspirants and Medical students.
