= Umdanagar =

- Census town
- Location in Hyderabad Telangana Location in India
- Coordinates: 17°18′00″N 78°24′56″E
- Country: India
- State: Telangana
- District: Ranga Reddy

Area
  - Total: 6.90 km^{2} (2.66 sq mi)

Population (2011)
  - Total: 9,449
  - Density: 1,370/km^{2} (3,550/sq mi)

Languages
  - Official: Telugu
- Time zone: UTC+5:30 (IST)
- Vehicle registration: TS

Umdanagar is a neighborhood in Hyderabad in the state of Telangana, India.

== Transport ==
Umdanagar is well-connected by the buses, TSRTC, which ply on two routes covering most of the area, and all the buses stop here. The neighbourhood is served by local trains at Umdanagar train station .

The Hyderabad Airport is located about 5 kilometers away.
