= Risala Bazar =

- Neighbourhood
- Interactive map of Risala Bazar
- Coordinates: 17°31′42″N 78°30′56″E
- Country: India
- State: Telangana
- District: Medchal–Malkajgiri district
- Metro: Hyderabad

Government
  - Body: GHMC

Languages
  - Official: Telugu, Urdu, English
- Time zone: UTC+5:30 (IST)
- PIN: 500010
- Lok Sabha constituency: Malkajgiri Lok Sabha constituency
- Vidhan Sabha constituency: Uppal Assembly constituency
- Planning agency: HUDA
- Civic agency: GHMC

Risala Bazaar is a suburb in Hyderabad, Telangana, India.

== Transport ==
It has good connectivity of buses by TGSRTC (Telangana State Road Transport Corporation). The local train is connected through MMTS.
