= Barkas, Hyderabad =

Barkas Salala
- Neighbourhood
- Location in Hyderabad, India Barkas Salala (India)
- Coordinates: 17°18′47″N 78°28′58″E
- Country: India
- State: Telangana
- District: Hyderabad
- Metro: Hyderabad
- Established: 1903
- Founded by: Nizam Mir Mahboob Ali Khan Siddiqi Bayafendi Asaf Jah VI
- Named after: Barracks

Government
  - Body: GHMC

Languages
  - Official: Telugu, Urdu
- Time zone: UTC+5:30 (IST)
- PIN: 500 005
- Vehicle registration: TG
- Lok Sabha constituency: Hyderabad
- Vidhan Sabha constituency: Chandrayangutta
- Planning agency: GHMC
- Website: telangana.gov.in

Barkas is a neighborhood in Hyderabad, India, located in the old city area of Hyderabad. The name "Barkas" is believed to be derived from the English word "Barracks". The old Arabs pronounced Barracks as Barkas in their Arabic flow. Barkas served as the military Barracks of the Nizam of Hyderabad. Another less popular version states that "The name 'Barkas' is derived from 'Wadiya Barkas', which was a colony in Saudi Arabia. A regiment from Barkas in Arabia had been called to Hyderabad. Thus most of the residents of this colony were originally inhabitants of Yemen and Arabia.

== History ==
Before Indian independence, Barkas served as the military Barracks of the Nizam of Hyderabad. The Nizams were surrounded by hostile rulers in the Deccan and chose to employ Arabs instead of the local military for the safeguarding of his family. These Arabs formed the bulk of the Nizams' personal army and were more reliable as they could not defect to the rival states unlike locals and were trustworthy. Many mentions state that the last Nizam loved their trait of loyalty and trusted them more than anyone else. The Arab population increased during this period, settling in mainly in barracks on the outskirts of the walled, gated city.

== Main attractions ==
Barkas houses a lot of mosques, especially the 'Jama'a Masjid'.

Barkas Maidan, historically significant during the Nizam's rule, served as a vital training and gathering ground for the army. This maidan was essential for military drills and exercises.

In the late 19th and early 20th centuries, the Nizams relied on these troops for their loyalty and military prowess. The maidan facilitated various military functions, including parades and ceremonial events.

'Mandi Road', the main road of Barkas, leads to the Shamshabad Airport from Chandrayangutta crossroads. It is lined with many restaurants serving a variety of Arab cuisine. This road is named after the most popular Arab dish - the Mandi.

== See also ==
- A. C. Guards
- Hyderabad State Forces
- King Kothi
