= Uppuguda =

- neighbourhood
- Location in Hyderabad, India Uppuguda (Telangana) Uppuguda (India)
- Country: India
- State: Telangana
- District: Hyderabad District
- Metro: Hyderabad

Government
  - Body: GHMC

Languages
  - Official: Telugu
- Time zone: UTC+5:30 (IST)
- PIN: 500 053
- Lok Sabha constituency: Hyderabad
- Vidhan Sabha constituency: Chandrayan Gutta
- Planning agency: GHMC

Uppuguda is a part of the Old City, Hyderabad, India.
