= Patny =

- Neighbourhood
- Location in Hyderabad, India Patny (India)
- Coordinates: 17.4403125°N 78.4953125°E
- Country: India
- State: Telangana
- District: Hyderabad
- Metro: Hyderabad
- Named for: Patny Motors

Government
  - Body: GHMC

Languages
  - Official: Telugu
- Time zone: UTC+5:30 (IST)
- PIN: 500 003
- Vehicle registration: TG
- Lok Sabha constituency: Secunderabad
- Vidhan Sabha constituency: Secunderabad
- Planning agency: GHMC
- Website: telangana.gov.in

Patny or Patny circle is a commercial shopping hub in Secunderabad, India.

== History ==
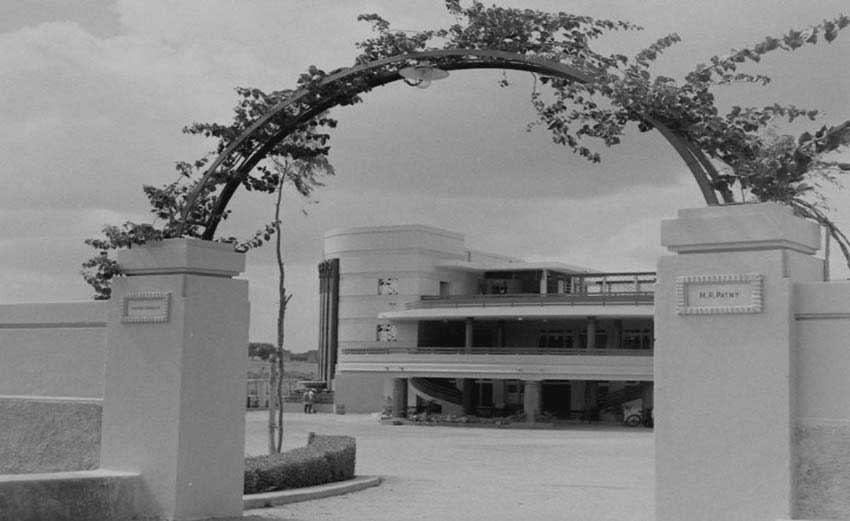
Patny Building, Secunderabad circa 1940

The place is named after a car showroom Patny Motors. The showroom which was established in 1927 by Mr. M. R. Patny later became a famous landmark. The historic Mehboob College is also located in Patny Circle. Initially founded in 1862 by Mr. Somasundaram Mudaliar as a public school for primary education, a first in those days. This was also where Swami Vivekananda addressed a large gathering in 1893 before he left for Chicago. This college building is declared as a heritage building by HUDA.

== Commercial area ==
The area is a major commercial and shopping area with many clothing stores. Clothing shops in Patny are particularly popular for sarees. The restaurant like Taj Mahal is noted here. Recent additions include Hotel Taj Tristar, Taj Belsons and Grand Minerva. The Secunderabad Telephone Exchange and the General Post Office are located here. Manju cinema and Cache Furniture Mall are situated right next to the Taj Mahal hotel.

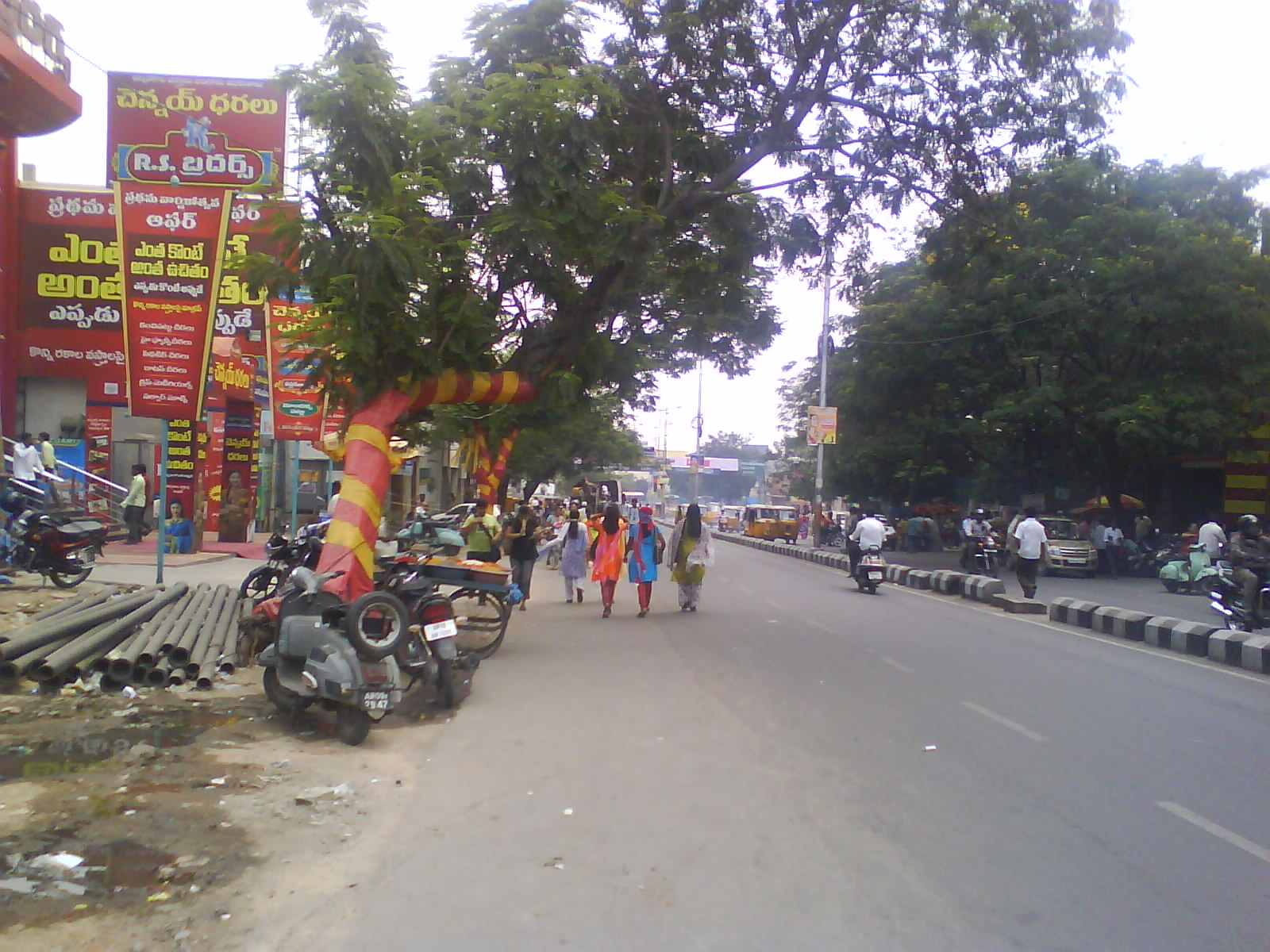
Patny Road in 2009

Swapnalok complex, one of the earliest shopping malls along with the Minerva complex, provides choices for shoppers. Many shops right across from these two complexes sell the Kolhapuri variety of chappals.

== Transport ==
The buses run by TSRTC Ranigunj (RNG) depot connect Patny to all parts of the city. The closest MMTS Train station is at Secunderabad station.
