= Santoshnagar =

Santoshnagar Colony
- neighborhood
- Location in Telangana, India Santoshnagar Colony (Telangana) Santoshnagar Colony (India)
- Coordinates: 17.35666°N 78.512199°E
- Country: India
- State: Telangana
- District: Hyderabad
- Metro: Hyderabad
- Zone: South Zone
- Ward: 21

Government
  - Body: GHMC

Languages
  - Official: Telugu, Urdu
- Time zone: UTC+5:30 (IST)
- PIN: 500 059
- Vehicle registration: TG
- Lok Sabha constituency: Hyderabad Lok Sabha constituency
- Vidhan Sabha constituency: Yakutpura Assembly constituency
- Planning agency: GHMC
- Website: telangana.gov.in

Santosh Nagar Colony, or Santoshnagar Colony, is a residential and commercial area in Hyderabad, India. It is located near Saidabad in the Old City of Hyderabad and DRDO laboratories. Hyderabad International Airport is about 14 kilometres (8.7 mi) or a 30-minute drive away from here. It is divided into two areas, the Old Santoshnagar Colony and New Santoshnagar Colony. Santoshnagar falls under the Yakutpura assembly constituency, which is represented by All India Majlis-e-Ittehadul Muslimeen Legislator Jaffer Hussain Meraj.

== Commercial area ==
Shops in Santoshnagar include supermarkets on the main road. The nearest market for wholesale vegetables and groceries is 2 km away in Saidabad.

Venkateshwara and Kankadurga are the most popular temples, and Masjid-e-Baghdadia, Masjid-e-Sahaba and the recently established Masjid-e-Nusrath are the most popular mosques in Santoshnagar.

== Public transport ==
Santoshnagar is connected by buses run by Telangana State Road Transport Corporation and is well connected with the rest of the city and the Hyderabad metropolitan area. Bus routes are the 102, 103, 104, 203, 253 and 478.

The nearest MMTS train stations are at Yakatpura and Malakpet respectively.

The nearest airport is Hyderabad International Airport, 19.5 km away in Shamshabad.

== Colonies around Santoshnagar ==
- Edi Bazar
- Maruthi Nagar,
- Durga Bhavani Nagar
- Yadagiri Nagar
- Champapet
- Central excise Colony
- Saidabad Colony and lab quarters.

There are also inner colonies in Santoshnagar such as:

- Khalander Nagar
- Mama Baqtawar Haat
- Banu Nagar

== Healthcare and education ==
Apollo Defence Research and Development Organisation, Owaisi Hospital, Srinivasa, and Nightingale are hospitals in the area. MS Poly Clinic & Dental Care, Near Bandh Naka (ACP Office)

The Deccan College of Medical Sciences is a famous medical college present in the locality. MVSR Engineering College is located 7 km from Santoshnagar.

Santoshnagar has many schools such as:

- Iqra Islamic International School
- Preston High School
- Vikas High School
- The Indo English High School
- Bhashyam High School
- Gnanodaya High School
- Sacred Heart High School,
- St. Joseph's Grammar High School
- Vidya Dayini Model High School
- Gautami talent high school
- Hidayah international
- Hyderabad International School

There are educational institutions and coaching centres too, such as Student's Point Coaching Center. and Faiz E Raza Institute.

The area also has many higher education colleges such as Narayana Junior College and Srinivasa Junior College.
