= Umdanagar railway station =

Railway station in Telangana, India

Coordinates: 17.2633512991°N 78.3932112967°E

Umdanagar

General information
- Location: Umdanagar, Hyderabad, Telangana; India
- Elevation: 581 metres (1,906 ft)
- System: Indian Railways and Hyderabad MMTS station
- Owner: Indian Railway
- Operator: South Central Railway
- Line: Kacheguda–Guntakal single line
- Platforms: 5

Other information
- Status: In use
- Station code: UR
- Zone(s): South Central Railway zone
- Division(s): Hyderabad Division
Location
- Location within Hyderabad Location within Telangana Location within India

The Umdanagar railway station is a fifth grade suburban (SG–5) category Indian railway station in Hyderabad railway division of South Central Railway zone. It is located in Hyderabad of the Indian state of Telangana. It was selected as one of the 21 stations to be developed under Amrit Bharat Stations scheme. The doubling and electrification of the 29.7 km section between Umdanagar- Shadnagar railway section was completed in 2022.
