= Pisal Banda =

- Neighbourhood
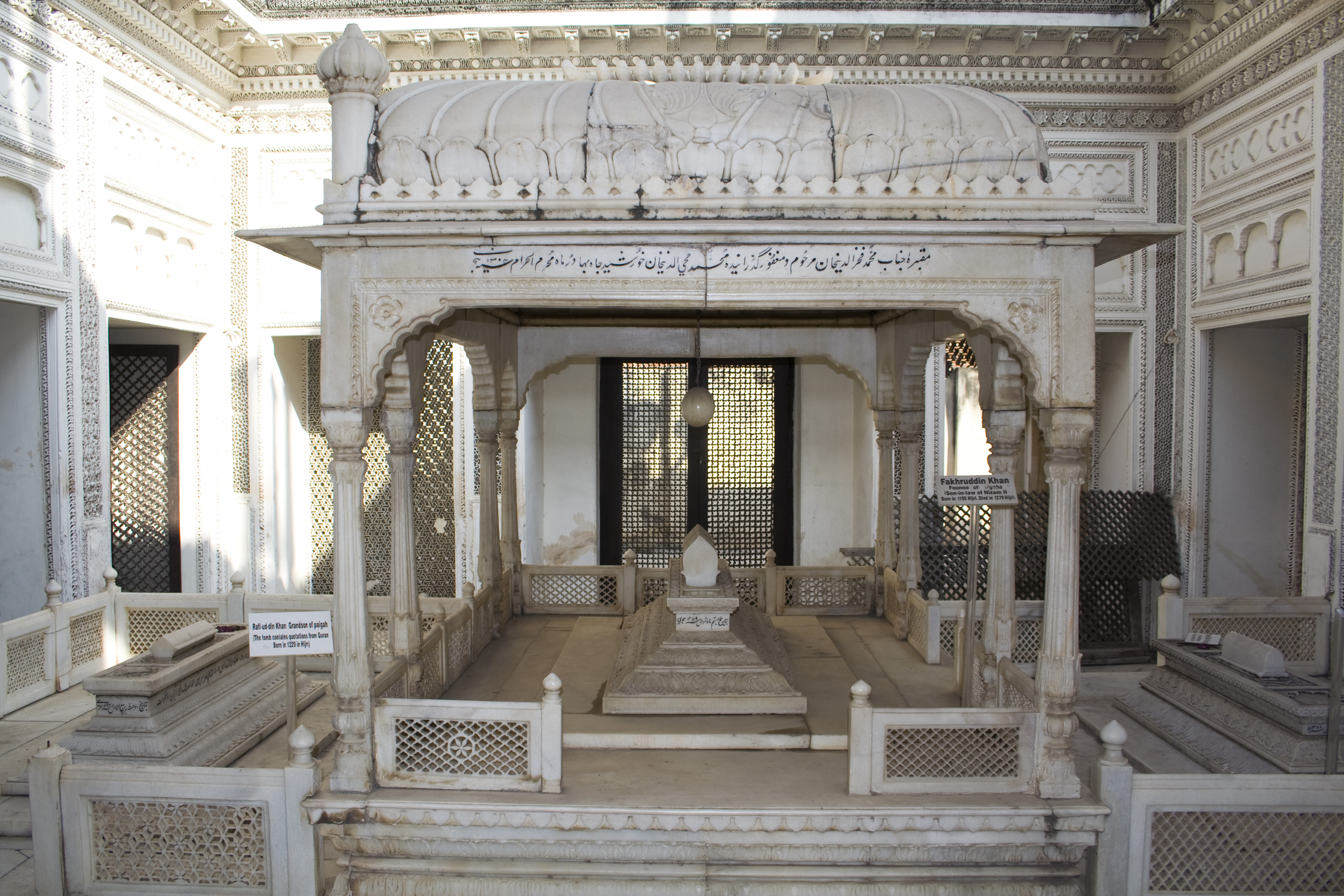
- Paigah Tombs

- Location in Telangana, India Pisal Banda (Telangana) Pisal Banda (India)
- Coordinates: 17°20′29″N 78°30′4″E
- Country: India
- State: Telangana
- District: Hyderabad
- Metro: Hyderabad

Government
  - Body: GHMC

Languages
  - Official: Telugu
- Time zone: UTC+5:30 (IST)
- PIN: 500 059
- Vehicle registration: TG
- Lok Sabha constituency: Hyderabad
- Vidhan Sabha constituency: Yakutpura
- Planning agency: GHMC

Phisal Banda is a neighbourhood near Santoshnagar neighbourhood in Hyderabad, Telangana, India. It is well known for being the site of the historic Paigah Tombs and Phisal Banda Palace of Nawab Zafar Jung Bahadur of Khursheed Jahi Paigah, a rich nobleman and amateur astronomer in Hyderabad, who bought a 6-inch telescope from England in 1901. He installed the telescope on the premises of his Phisal Banda Palace estate in a seven-storey Almirah-type building, in Hyderabad. He named it Nizamiah Observatory after the sixth Nizam of Hyderabad, Mir Mahboob Ali Khan. Nawab Zafar Jung Bahadur died in 1907 and as per his request, the Nizam's Government took over the observatory. In accordance with his wishes, the administration of the observatory was taken over by the Finance Department of the Nizam's Government in 1908.[2][3] (now Deccan Medical College and Owaisi Hospital are situated at the very same place).

== Commercial area ==
There are many shops catering to all budgets. There is a big vegetable market at Madannapet, which is quite popular among people of surrounding suburbs.

== Transport ==
TSRTC connects Pisal Banda with all parts of the city. The buses in service are 93, 94, 97D, 98, 102, etc. The closest MMTS Train station is at Yakutpura.
