= Necklace Road railway station =

Railway station in Hyderabad, India

Necklace Road
- Necklace Road MMTS Station with The Park Hyderabad Hotel in the background

General information
- Coordinates: 17.360°N 78.492°E
- System: Indian Railways and Hyderabad MMTS station
Location

Necklace Road railway station is a railway station in Hyderabad, Telangana, India. Localities like Minister Road, Raj Bhavan, Somajiguda and Necklace Road are accessible from this station.

== Lines ==
- Hyderabad Multi-Modal Transport System
  - Secunderabad – Nampally (Hyderabad) (SH Line)
