= Rein Bazar =

Rein Bazar Old City
- Inner city
- Country: India
- State: Telangana
- District: Hyderabad District
- Metro: Hyderabad Metropolitan Development Authority

Government
  - Body: GHMC

Languages
  - Official: Telugu
- Time zone: UTC+5:30 (IST)
- PIN: 500023
- Vehicle registration: TG
- Lok Sabha constituency: Hyderabad Lok Sabha constituency
- Vidhan Sabha constituency: Yakutpura Assembly constituency
- Planning agency: GHMC
- Website: telangana.gov.in

Rein Bazar is a part of Old City, Hyderabad, in Telangana, India.

== Transport ==
Now TGSRTC (Telangana State Road Transport Corporation) buses serve Rein Bazar.

The closest MMTS Train station is at Yakutpura.

The TGSRTC (Telangana State Road Transport Corporation) bus services will operate from Bagh-E-Jahanara to Charminar.
