= RTC X Roads =

- Neighbourhood
- Location in Hyderabad, Telangana, India RTC X Roads (Telangana) RTC X Roads (India)
- Coordinates: 17.403247°N 78.498641°E
- Country: India
- State: Telangana
- District: Hyderabad
- Metro: Hyderabad

Government
  - Body: GHMC

Languages
  - Official: Telugu
- Time zone: UTC+5:30 (IST)
- PIN: 500 020
- Vehicle registration: TG
- Lok Sabha constituency: Secunderabad Lok Sabha constituency
- Vidhan Sabha constituency: Musheerabad Assembly constituency
- Planning agency: GHMC
- Website: telangana.gov.in

RTC X roads or RTC cross roads is a road and one of the major commercial centres in Hyderabad, Telangana, India.

== Commercial area ==
RTC X Roads is known as a hub of major movie theatres. All the major Tollywood new releases open here. Some notable cinemas include Sandhya 70 mm and 35 mm, Sri Mayuri 70 mm, Sudarshan 35 mm, Devi 70 mm, Sapthagiri 70 mm, Usha mayuri 70mm, Sri sai raja 70mm and more.

The famous Hyderabadi restaurants, Bawaarchi and Astoria are located here. The other name for RTC X Roads is Charminar Chowrasta, got this name because of the Charminar Cigarette Factory Nearby VST (Vazeer Sultan Industries).

== Transport ==
TSRTC operates buses connecting the area with all parts of the city. It is close to Secunderabad. The closest MMTS train station is at Vidyanagar or Jamia Osmania.
