= Madeenaguda =

- Neighbourhood
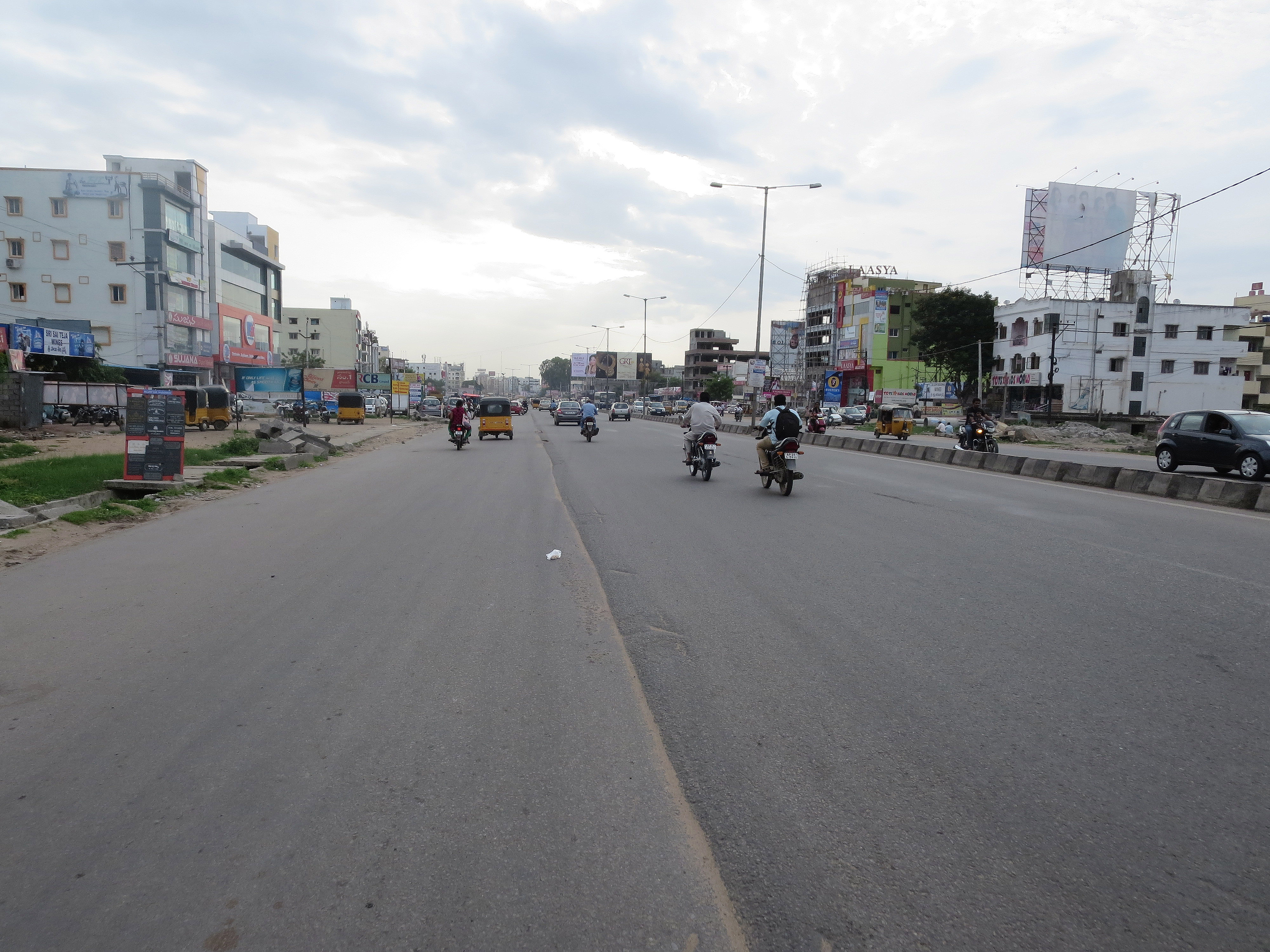
- Madinaguda Area in Hyderabad lying on NH-9

- Location in Telangana, India Madeenaguda (India)
- Coordinates: 17.496111°N 78.341667°E
- Country: India
- State: Telangana
- District: Ranga Reddy district
- Metro: Hyderabad

Government
  - Body: GHMC

Languages
  - Official: Telugu
- Time zone: UTC+5:30 (IST)
- PIN: 500 049
- Vehicle registration: TG
- Lok Sabha constituency: Hyderabad
- Vidhan Sabha constituency: Serlingampally
- Planning agency: CMC
- Website: telangana.gov.in

Madeenaguda is a neighbourhood of Hyderabad, Telangana, India. It is located between Chanda Nagar and Hafeezpet and Miyapur in the north western part of the city. This neighbourhood has grown intensively after the IT boom in the Madhapur area. It is a municipal ward, situated in the Miyapur area, within the Serilingampally mandal of Ranga Reddy district, and forms part of the Cyberabad Municipal Corporation (CMC) Ward 237 . In December 2025, Government of Telangana made Madeenaguda a municipal ward within Miyapur Circle under Serilingampally Zone, as part of restructuring of GHMC.

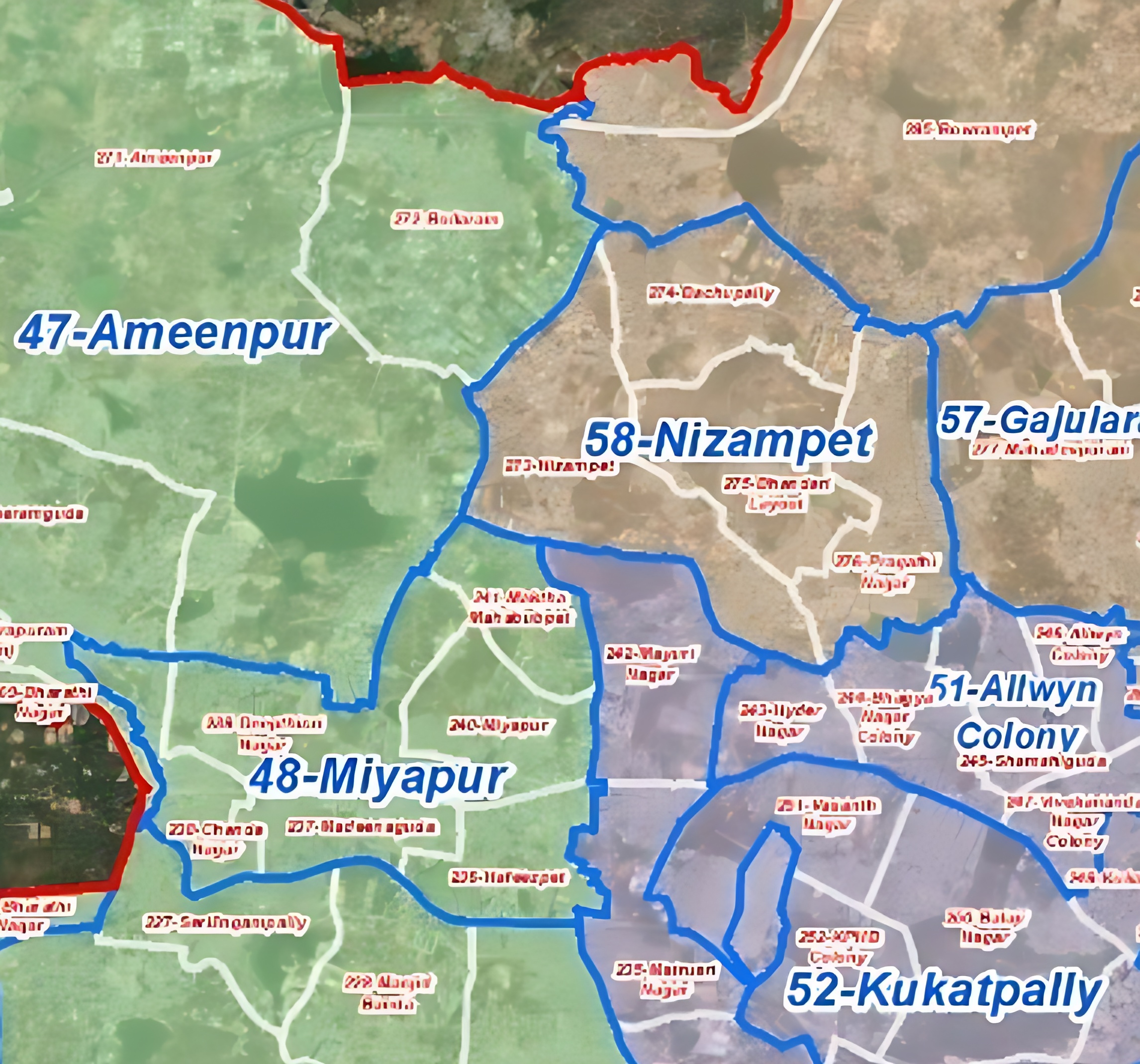
Miyapur Circle Map

== Commercial area ==
There are many shops catering to all budgets. There is a big market at Miyapur, which is quite popular among people of surrounding suburbs. It is just 11 km away from Hi-tech city therefore attracting the IT people.

Madeenaguda consists various malls like GSM Mall and many textile shops. It is connected to National Highway 65(NH65), so commercial establishments are common nearby. It was a village before the GHMC merged with the Ranga Reddy district in 2006.

== Transport ==
TSRTC connects Madeenaguda with all parts of the city.

The closest MMTS Train station is at Chanda Nagar and Hafeezpet.

The closest Metro station is at Miyapur
