= Suchitra Centre =

- Cross roads
- Location in Telangana, India Suchitra Centre (Telangana) Suchitra Centre (India)
- Coordinates: 17.489005°N 78.473025°E
- Country: India
- State: Telangana
- District: Hyderabad
- Metro: Hyderabad
- Ward: 130

Government
  - Body: GHMC

Languages
  - Official: Telugu
- Time zone: UTC+5:30 (IST)
- PIN: 500 067
- Vehicle registration: TG
- Lok Sabha constituency: Malkajgiri
- Vidhan Sabha constituency: Qutubullapur
- Planning agency: HMDA
- Civic agency: GHMC
- Website: telangana.gov.in

Suchitra Junction or Suchitra Centre or Suchitra cross roads is a suburb of Hyderabad, Telangana, India, on the Bowenpally-Medchal Road.

== History ==
Suchitra Electronics Ltd., an electric component unit at Suchitra Junction from 1981 to 2000, promoted by Krishnam Raju. They were employed over 1500 employees despite subpar infrastructure and public transport. This was a major establishment in those days. Hence it came to be known as Suchitra Junction. At the same premises Suchitra Academy (CBSE School) had been set up.

Along Malkajgiri, Dayanand Nagar, Safilguda, R.K.Puram,Bowenpally, Ammuguda, Cavalry Barracks, Alwal, Bolarum Bazaar, Gundla Pochampalli and Gowdavalli the MMTS will touch these spots while racing towards Medchal. The Secunderabad-Medchal line is expected to be around 28 km long. On the busy Patancheru sector, the service which presently terminates at Lingampally gets extended till the bustling industrial estate with new stations identified at Tellapur, BHEL, Ashoknagar and Patancheru.

== Colonies in Suchitra Centre ==
BHEL Avemachs,Boudha nagar colony, Praga Tools Colony, Subhash Nagar, Sri Durga Estates, Raghavendra Colony, Gayatri Nagar, Bank Colony, MNReddy Nagar, Ramaraj Nagar,Jayaram Nagar, Venkateshwara Colony, New Manikyanagar, Bhagyalaxmi Colony, Godavari Homes, Shantha sriram satellite township, laxmi ganga enclave, Spring Fields Colony, Sri Nilaya Enclave.

== Basic Amenities ==
Suchitra Centre got many amenities like good schools, banks, hospitals, supermarkets, restaurants TNR NorthCity Mall, a shopping mall which is under construction by TNR Estates will have Cinepolis multiplex with 10 screens, food courts, 75+ retail stores and hyper market on a 6.3 Lakh square foot area including parking.
