= Chikkadpally =

- Neighbourhood
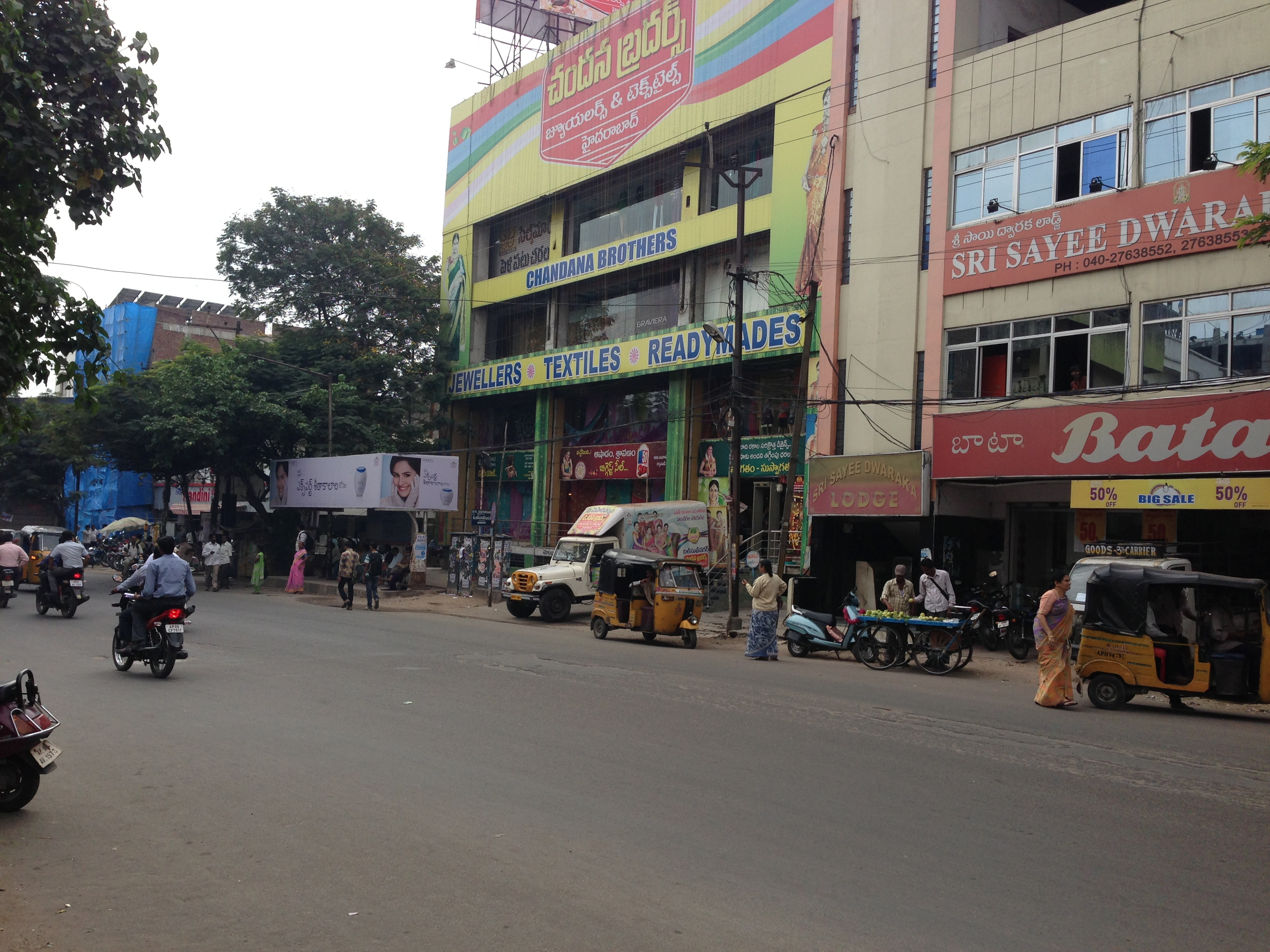
- Chikkadpally Main Road

- Location in Hyderabad, India Chikkadpally (India)
- Coordinates: 17.403247°N 78.498641°E
- Country: India
- State: Telangana
- District: Hyderabad
- Metro: Hyderabad

Government
  - Body: GHMC

Languages
  - Official: Telugu
- Time zone: UTC+5:30 (IST)
- PIN: 500020
- Vehicle registration: TG
- Lok Sabha constituency: Hyderabad
- Vidhan Sabha constituency: Musheerabad
- Planning agency: GHMC
- Website: telangana.gov.in

Chikkadpally is a locality in the city of Hyderabad, in the state of Telangana, India.

Chikkadpally is surrounded by Musheerabad, Ashok Nagar, Narayanguda and Bagh Lingampally.

== History ==
According to locals, Chikkadpally derives its name from chikkad, meaning mud, and -pally (originally palle, పల్లె in Telugu) meaning place or hamlet. Since Chikkadpally is in a low-lying area, it is usually plagued by chikkad due to inflow of drain water. According to some other locals, Chikkadpally derives its name from cheekatipally (place/hamlet of shadows).

== Transport ==
TSRTC buses connect all major parts of the city, Chikkadpally included. The closest MMTS Train station is at Vidyanagar or Jamia Osmania. Secunderabad Railway Station is 6 kilometres away and the Rajiv Gandhi International Airport 25 kilometres away.

The Hyderabad Metro now runs through the area, with two stations in proximity.

== Culture ==
The City Central Library is located here. The devotional singer M.S.Ramarao lived here, and a street -- Sundara Kanda M.S. Ramarao Lane -- is named for him.

A well-known Cultural Auditorium, Thyaagaraaya Gaanasabha, is located here, and sees many cultural activities and meetings.

The historic Lord Venkateshwara Temple, located here, is one of the oldest landmarks of Chikkadpally.

Several popular cinemas are scattered around Chikkadpally and the surrounding area, and screen predominantly Telugu (Tollywood) movies.

== Gallery ==
Notable places in Chikkadpally

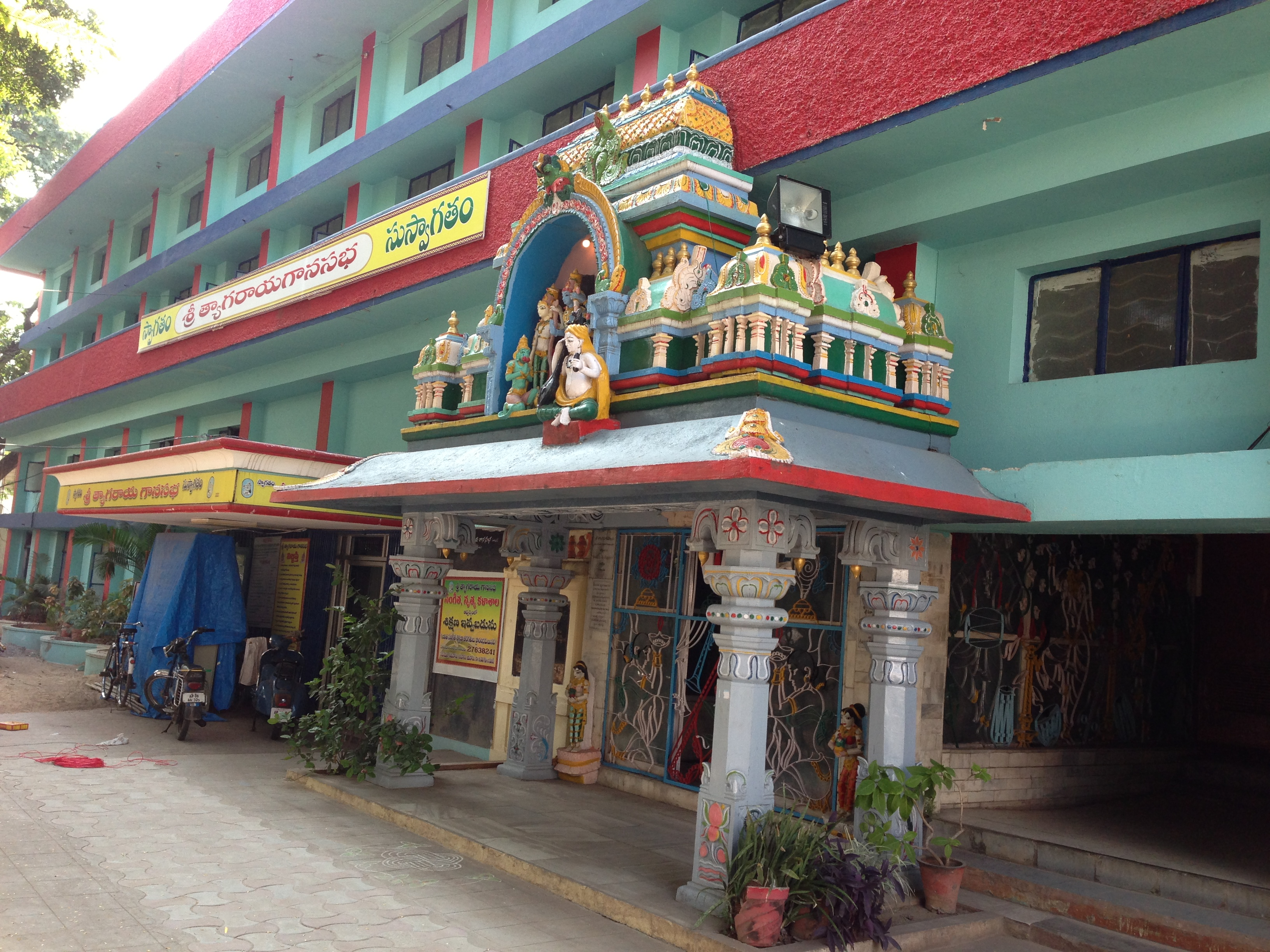
Sri Thyagaraya Gana Sabha

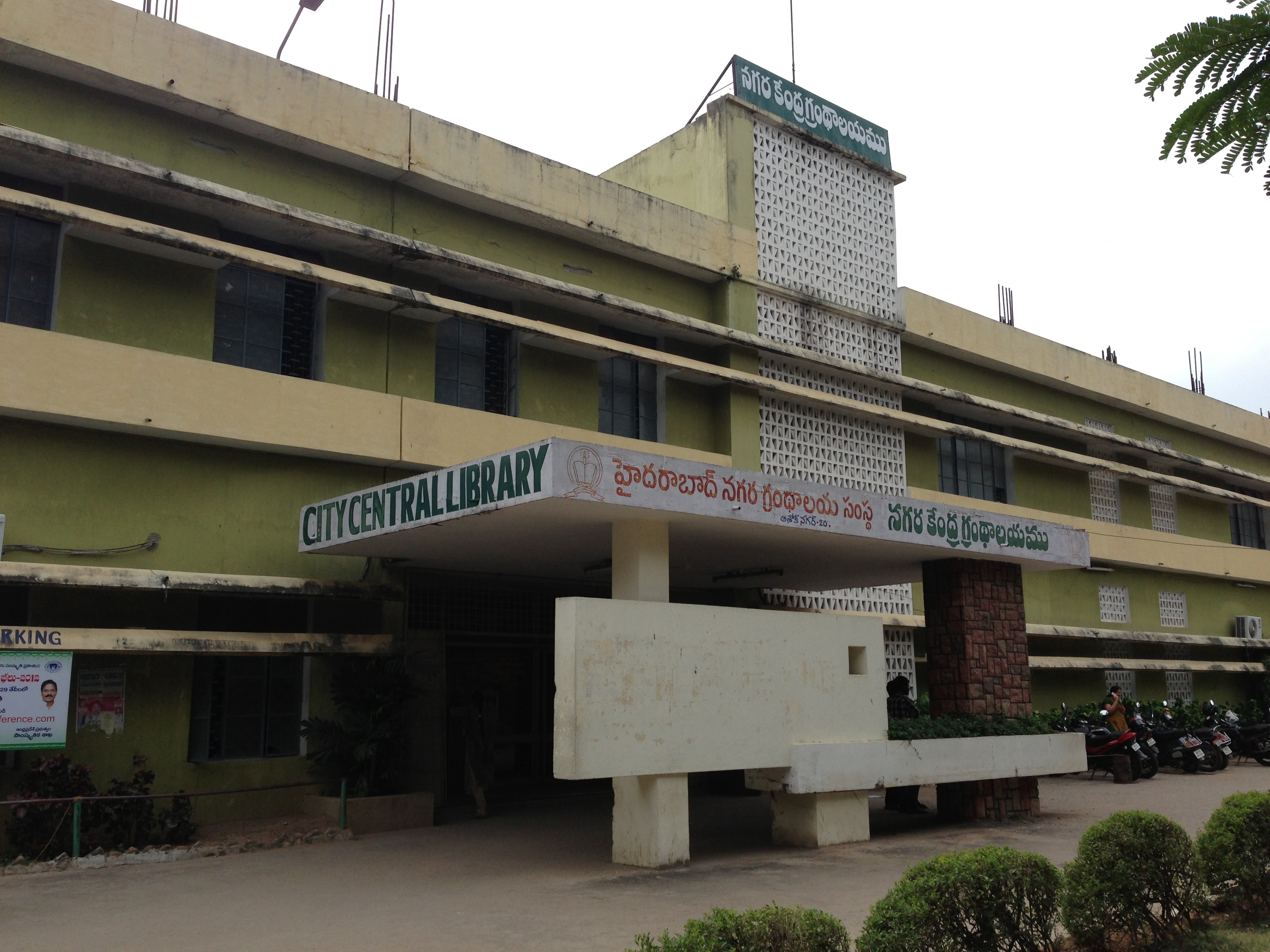
City Central Library

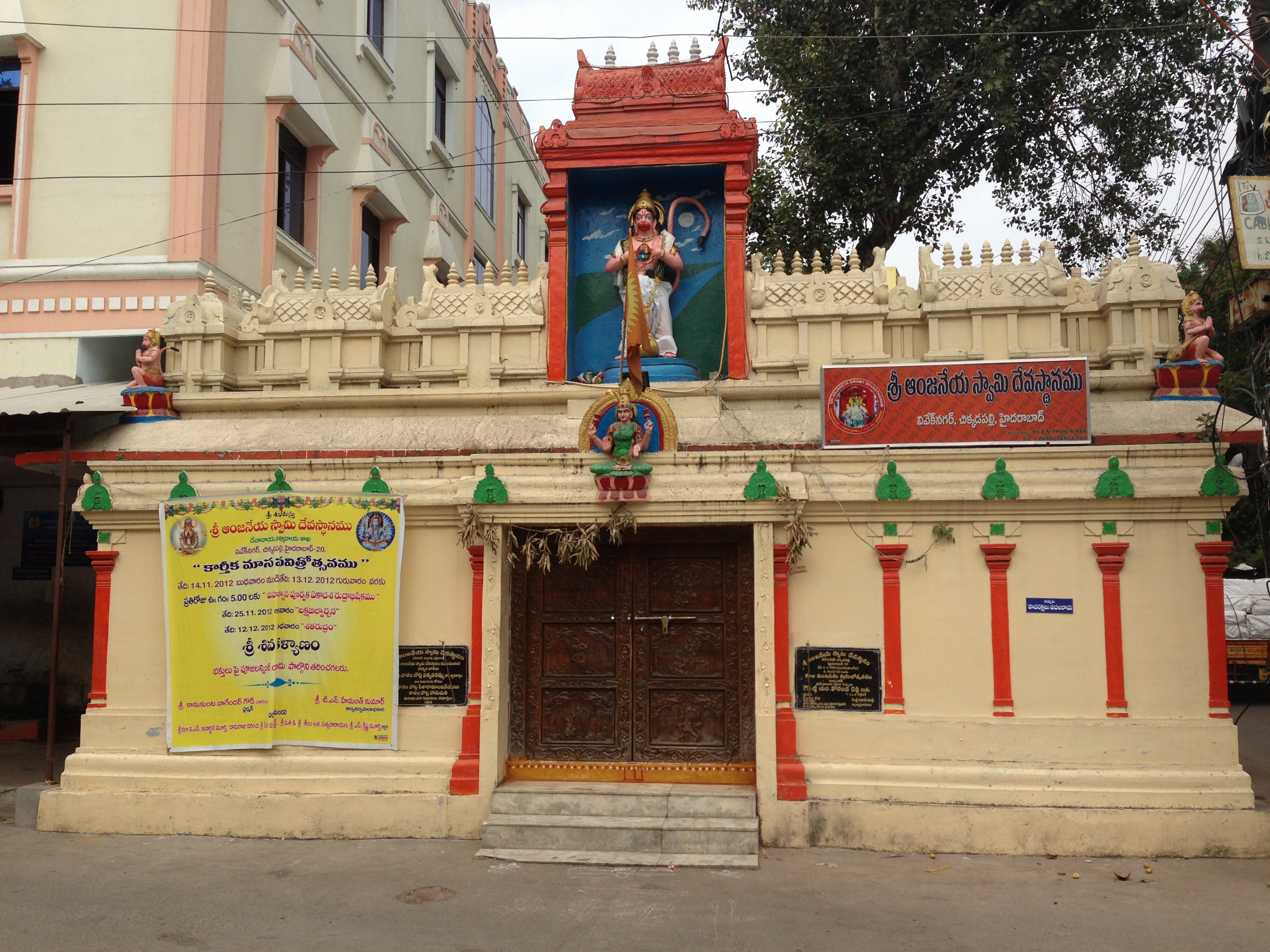
Sri Anjaneya Swamy Temple

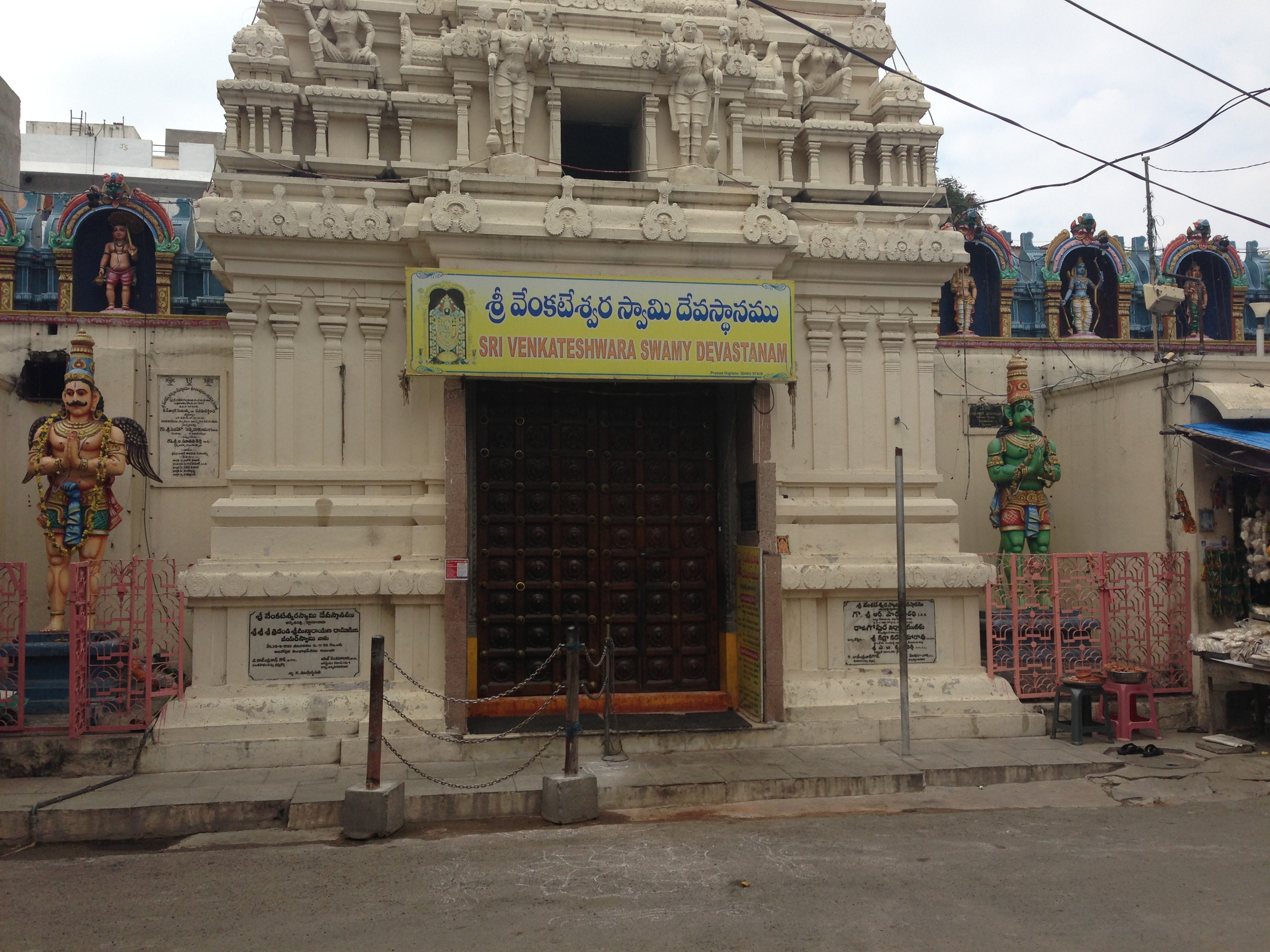
Sri Venkateswara Swamy Temple

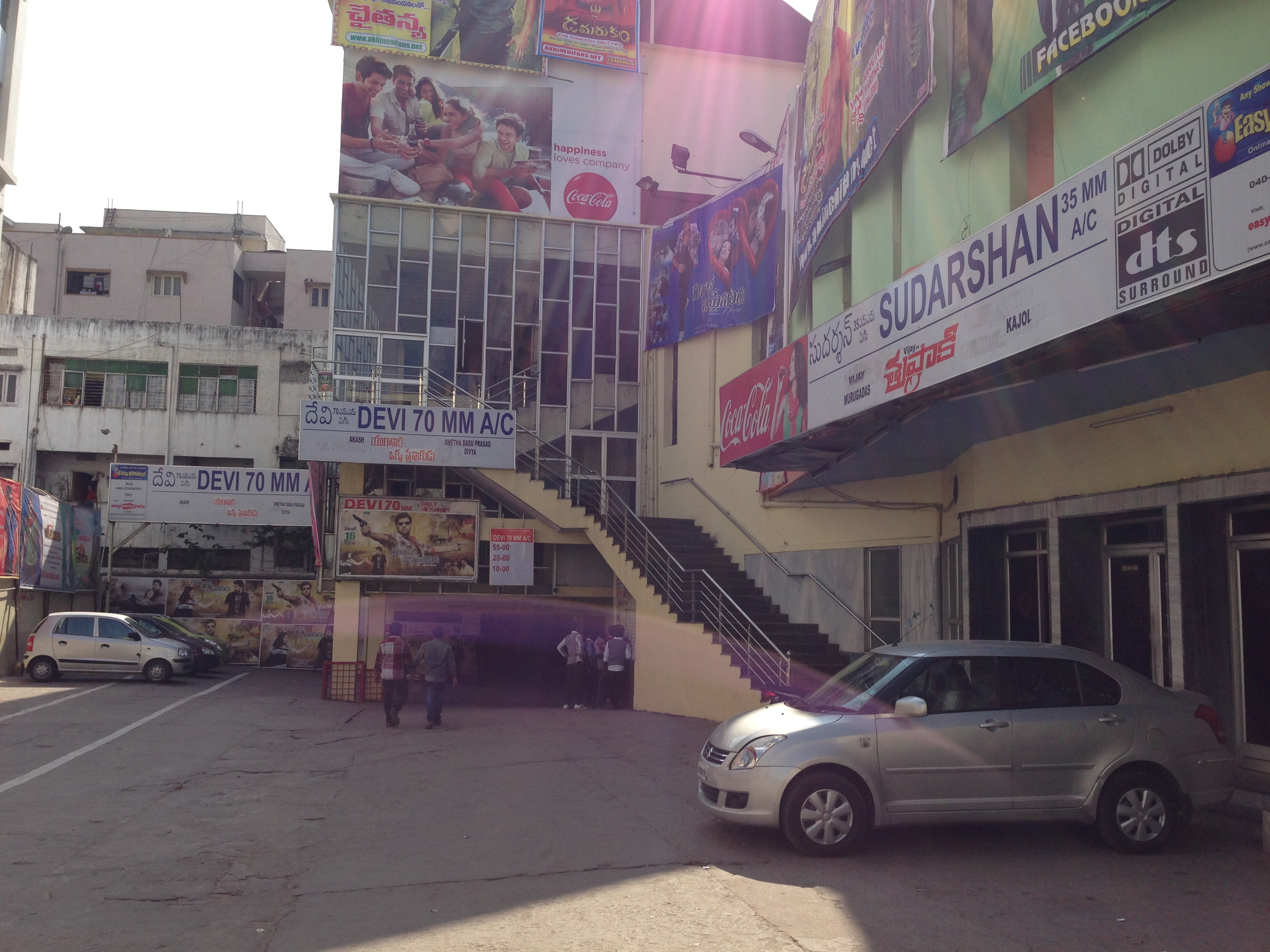
Devi 70mm and Sudarshan 35mm
