= Chandanagar railway station =

Railway station in Hyderabad, India

Chandanagar
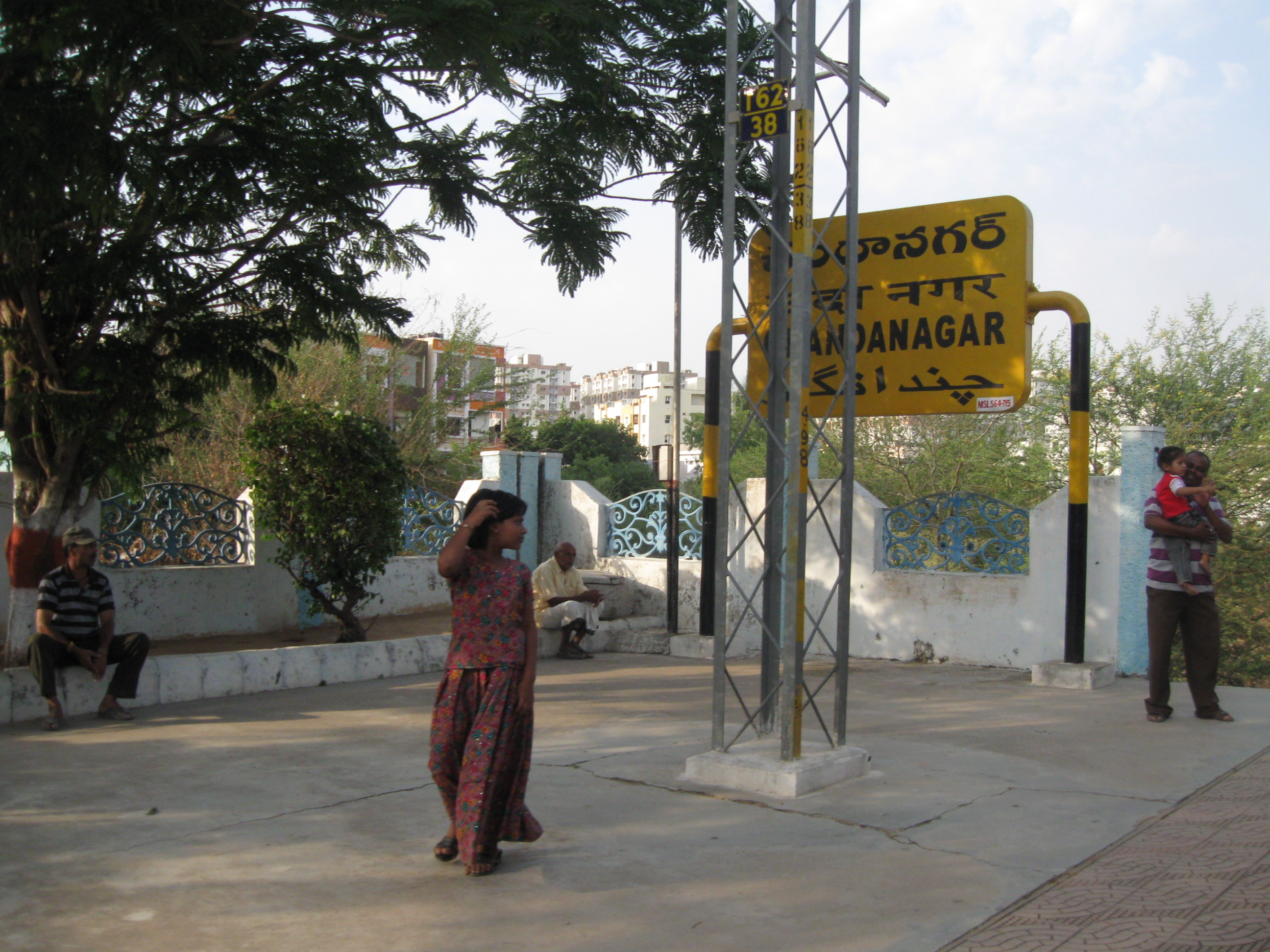

General information
- Location: Hyderabad, Telangana
- Coordinates: 17.487363°N 78.332715°E
- System: Indian Railways and Hyderabad MMTS station
Location

Chandanagar railway station is a railway station in Hyderabad, Telangana, India. Localities like Chandanagar and Madinaguda are accessible from this station.

== Lines ==
- Hyderabad Multi-Modal Transport System
  - Secunderabad–Falaknuma route (SF Line)
