= Barkatpura =

- neighbourhood
- Location in Hyderabad, India Barkatpura (Telangana) Barkatpura (India)
- Coordinates: 17.391515°N 78.497215°E
- Country: India
- State: Telangana
- District: Hyderabad
- Metro: Hyderabad

Government
  - Body: GHMC

Languages
  - Official: Telugu
- Time zone: UTC+5:30 (IST)
- PIN: 500 027
- Vehicle registration: TG
- Lok Sabha constituency: Secunderabad
- Vidhan Sabha constituency: Amberpet
- Planning agency: GHMC
- Website: telangana.gov.in

Barkatpura is a neighbourhood in Hyderabad, Telangana, India. The Barkatpura Chaman is a popular landmark of this suburb.

There are many diagnostic centres, hospitals and parks located here. It is a primarily residential area, and is located close to the Kacheguda railway station

The Provident Fund Office is located here.

Barkatpura is named after Sheikh Barkat Ali, Professor of Mathematics and Head of department, Osmania university, Hyderabad.

== Educational centres and hospitals ==
Colleges:

- Raja Bahadur Venkata Rama Reddy Women's College (Reddy Women's College)
- Nrupatunga Junior, Degree and PG college
- St. Francis Xavier Degree College
- St. Francis Xavier Junior College
- Global Institute of Hotel Management
- Nalsar University of Law Corporate Office
- Andhra Yuvathi Mandali College and school
- Andhra Mahila College
- Bharath PG College
- Avanthi College

Hospitals

- Woodlands Hospitals
- MEDALL Diagnostics
- Sri Krishna Super Speciality Neuro Hospital
- CC Shroff Memorial Hospital
- Geetha Clinic and Maternity Home
- Shalini Hospital
- Ankilla Dental and Polyclinic
- Bristlecone Hospital
- Hepa Scan Center

Barkatpura also has the office of the Dyslexia Association of Andhra Pradesh.

== Transport ==
Barkatpura is well-connected by the state-run bus service TSRTC, which has a depot in Barkatpura.

The closest MMTS Train station is at Kachiguda.
