= Necklace Road =

Major road in Hyderabad, India

PVNR Marg

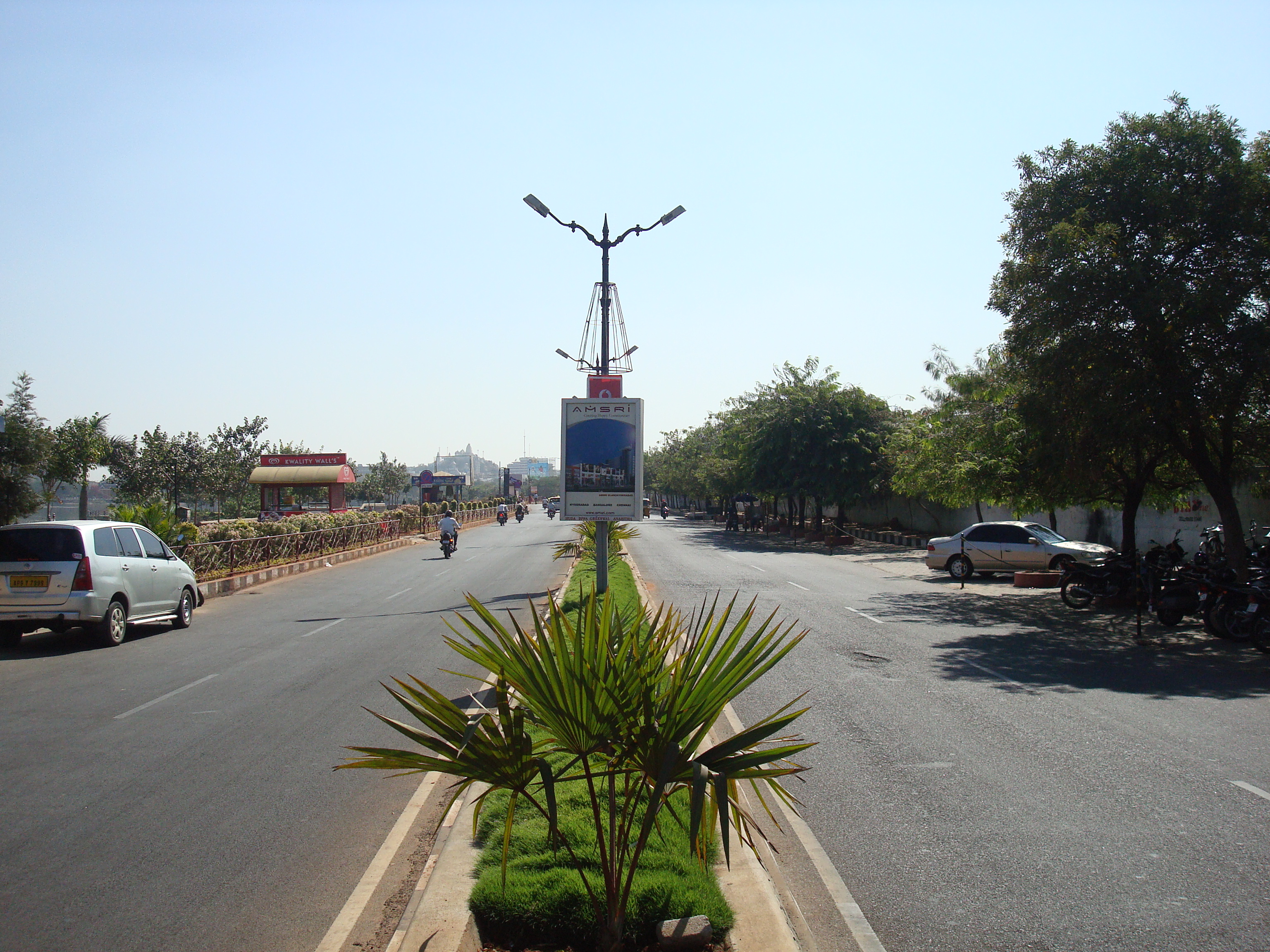

Route information
- Maintained by Greater Hyderabad Municipal Corporation, Hyderabad Metropolitan Development Authority
- Length: 5.5 km (3.4 mi)

Major junctions
- South end: Tank Bund Road

Location
- Country: India
- States: Telangana

Highway system
- Roads in India; Expressways; National; State; Asian

PV Narasimha Rao Marg (PVNR Marg) is a road in Hyderabad, Telangana, adjoining the Hussain Sagar lake, which connects NTR Gardens to Sanjeevaiah Park. It is named after the first and the famous Necklace Road in Mumbai's Marine Drive. The road from Sanjeevaiah Park connects to the Tankbund Road which in turn connects to the NTR Gardens, completing a circle.

The road was renamed in 2021 on the occasion of centenary celebrations of P. V. Narasimha Rao.

This road connects to nearby parks such as Jogi bear park, Sanjeevaiah Park and Jalavihar. Both these parks provide open spaces and calm environment. This boulevard is frequented by early morning joggers, and hosts marathon events, and evening hangouts.

== Transport ==
The Necklace Road MMTS Station is the closest rapid transit facility available connecting to all major parts of the city.
