= James Street railway station, Hyderabad =

Railway station in Hyderabad, India

James Street
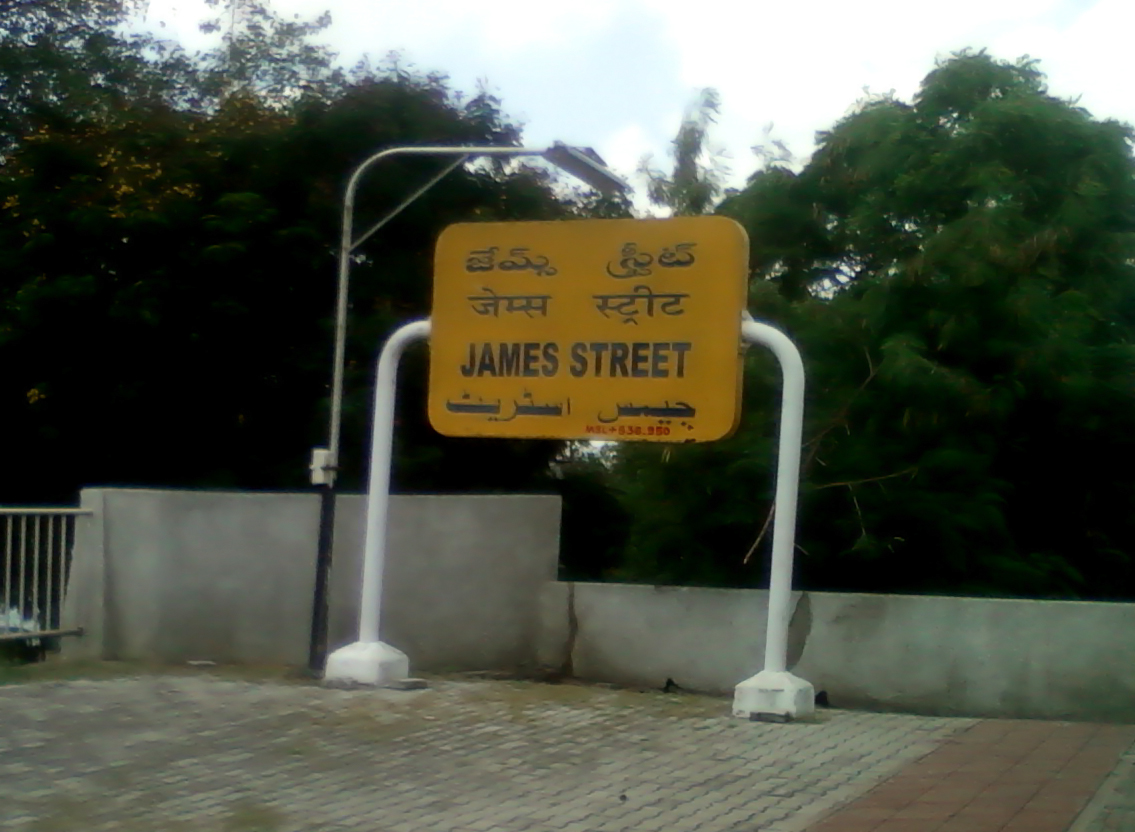
- James Street railway station

General information
- Location: Secunderabad; India
- Coordinates: 17°25′58.4″N 78°29′12.3″E
- Elevation: 522 metres (1,713 ft)
- System: Indian Railways and Hyderabad MMTS station
- Owner: Indian Railways
- Platforms: 2

Other information
- Station code: JET
- Zone(s): South Central Railway
- Division(s): Hyderabad

History
- Opened: 1874; 152 years ago
Location
- Location within Hyderabad

James Street railway station is a railway station in Secunderabad, Telangana. The station was built in 1874 and was the second station after Secunderabad station on the Hyderabad–Wadi sector by Nizam State Railways. The station derives its name from erstwhile James Street located adjacent to this station. After India's independence, this street was later renamed as Mahatma Gandhi Road. The railways station was amongst the first railway stations to have been built as a self-financed first railway line from Secunderabad to Wadi by the sixth Nizam Mir Mahbub Ali Khan Bahadur. This railway line later became part of the Nizam's Guaranteed State Railway. In 1951, James Town railway station and the line were made a part of Central Railway zone.

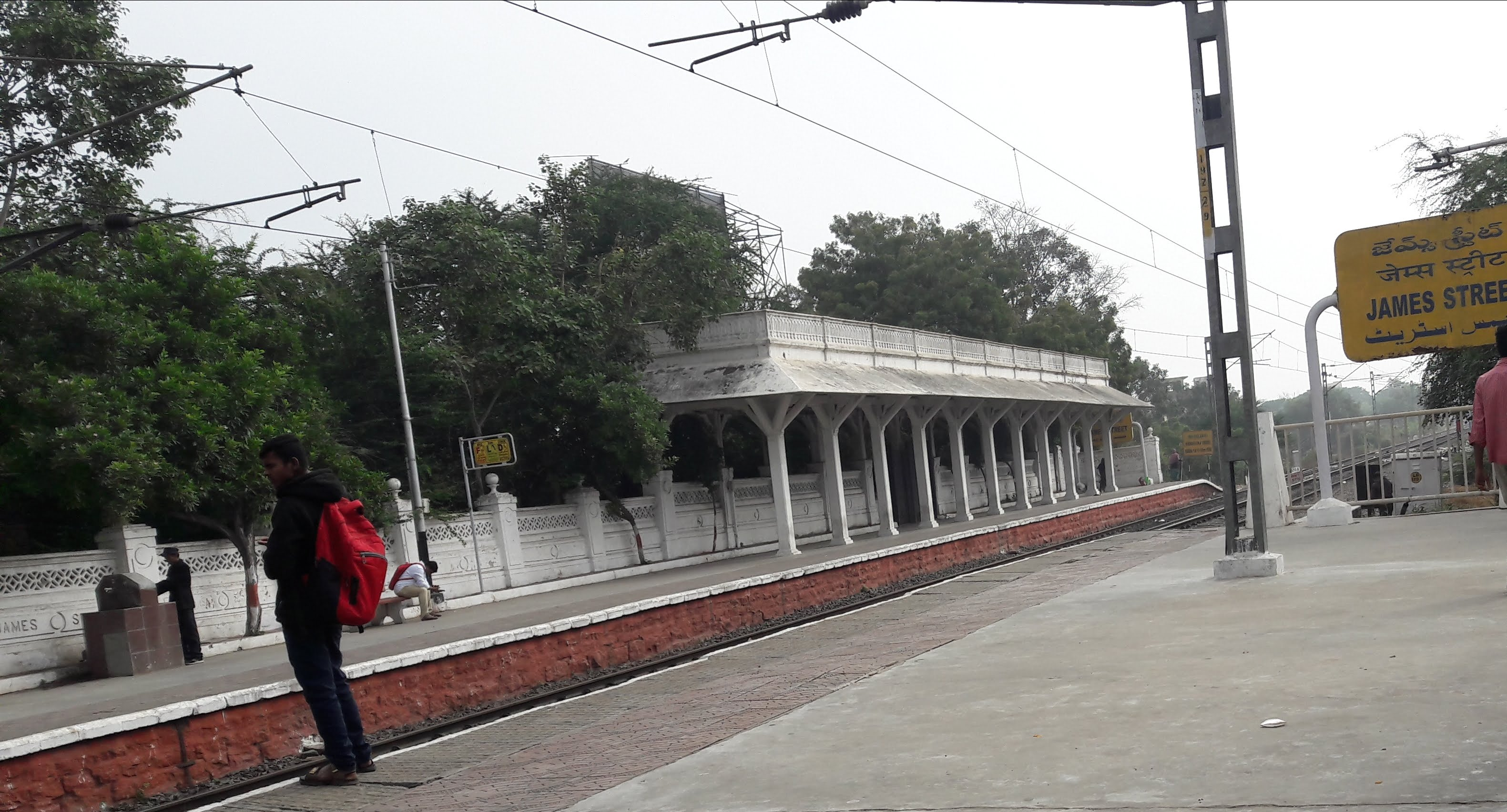

== Lines ==
- Hyderabad Multi-Modal Transport System
  - Falaknuma–Hyderabad (FH line)
