= Borabanda railway station =

Railway station in Hyderabad, India

Borabanda

General information
- Coordinates: 17.360°N 78.492°E
- System: Indian Railways and Hyderabad MMTS station
Location

Borabanda railway station is a railway station in Hyderabad, Telangana, India. Localities like Mothi Nagar, Rajeev Nagar and Erragadda are accessible from this station.This railway station is nearby allapur.

== Lines ==
- Hyderabad Multi-Modal Transport System
  - Secunderabad–Falaknuma route (SF Line)
