= Sanjeevaiah Park railway station =

Railway station in Hyderabad, India

Sanjeevaiah Park
- Sanjeevaiah Park MMTS station East end nameboard

General information
- Coordinates: 17.360°N 78.492°E
- System: Indian Railways and Hyderabad MMTS station
Location

Sanjeevaiah Park railway station is a railway station in Hyderabad, Telangana, India. It is located adjacent to the Sanjeevaiah Park on the banks of the Hussain Sagar lake.

== Lines ==
- Multi-Modal Transport System, Hyderabad
  - Secunderabad–Falaknuma route (FS Line)
