= Balanagar mandal =

Balanagar
- Mandal
- Country: India
- State: Telangana
- District: Medchal-Malkajgiri
- Headquarters: Balanagar

Government
  - Tehsildar: Tata Mohan Rao

Population (2011)
  - Total: 779,289

Languages
  - Official: Telugu
- Time zone: UTC+5:30 (IST)

Balanagar mandal is one of the 15 mandals in Medchal-Malkajgiri district in the Indian state of Telangana. It is under the administration of Malkajgiri revenue division with its headquarters at Balanagar. The mandal is bounded by Quthbullapur, Serilingampally mandals and Hyderabad district.

== Governance ==
Balanagar mandal is shared by two assembly constituencies namely, Kukatpally and Serilingampally. Kukatpally constituency is in turn is under Malkajgiri, while, Serlingampally constituency is under Chevella.

== Towns and villages ==
Balanagar mandal do not have any villages and the whole mandal is an urban area and a part of GHMC.
