= Falaknuma railway station =

Railway station in Hyderabad, India

Falaknuma
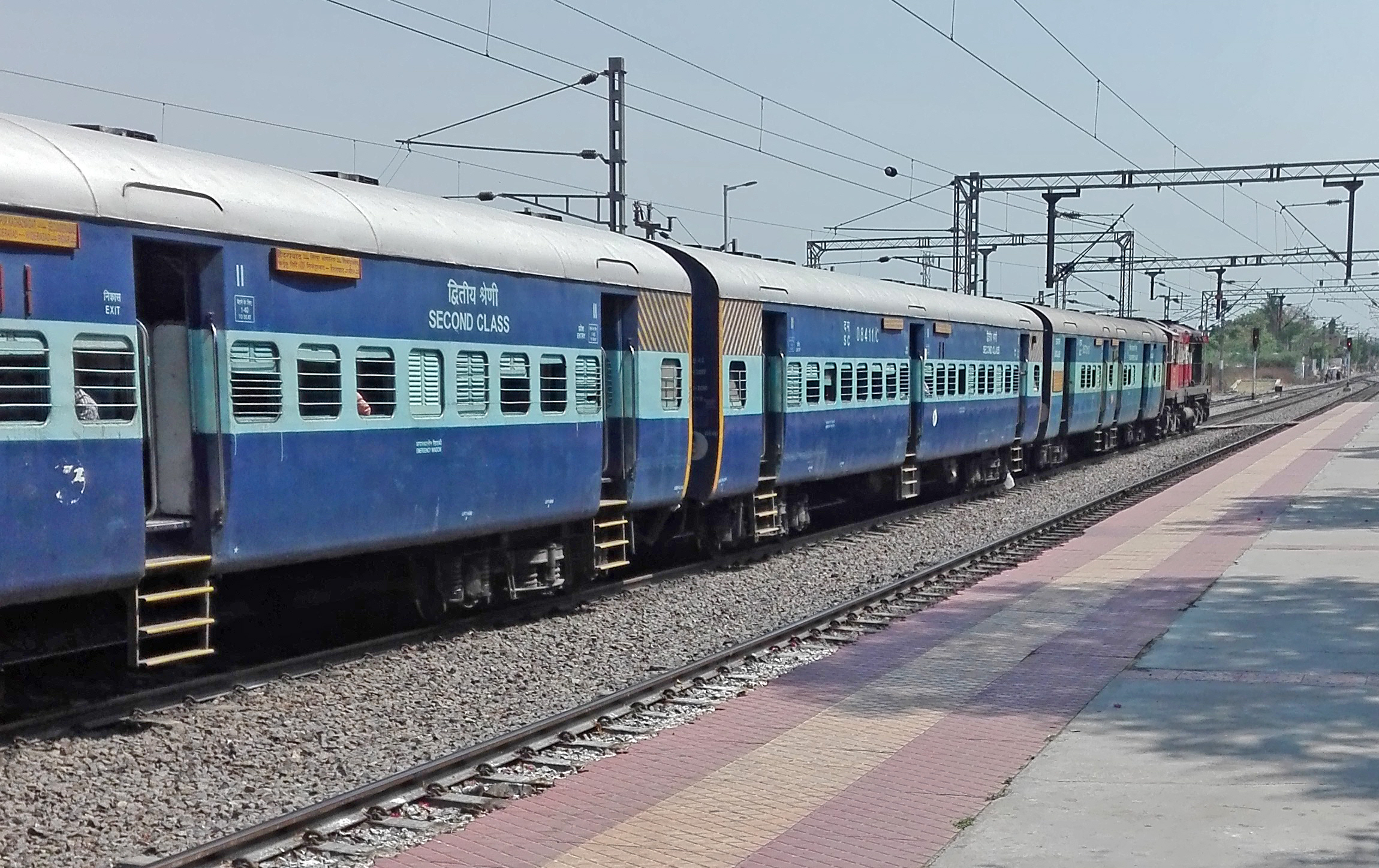
- Kurnool Intercity Express at Falaknuma railway station

General information
- Location: Hyderabad, Telangana; India
- Coordinates: 17.332712°N 78.475175°E
- Elevation: 523 m (1,716 ft)
- System: Indian Railways and Hyderabad MMTS station
- Line: 4
- Platforms: 3

Other information
- Status: Active
- Station code: FM
- Zone(s): South Central Railway
- Division(s): Hyderabad
Location

Falaknuma railway station is a third grade suburban (SG–3) category Indian railway station in Hyderabad railway division of South Central Railway zone. It is located in Hyderabad of the Indian state of Telangana.

== History ==
This is one of the oldest stations in the Hyderabad built by the Nizams.

== Location ==
Falaknuma station is near Falaknuma palace. For commuters in Jangammet, Chandrayangutta and Engin Bowli is nearer station to go to Secundrabad and Shamshabad.

== See also ==
- Hyderabad Multi-Modal Transport System
