= Vidyanagar =

Urban area in Hyderabad, India

- Urban
- Location in Telangana, India Vidyanagar (Telangana) Vidyanagar (India)
- Coordinates: 17°24′17″N 78°30′44″E
- Country: India
- State: Telangana
- District: Hyderabad District
- Metro: Hyderabad Metropolitan Development Authority

Government
  - Body: GHMC

Population (2011)
  - Total: 32,032

Languages
  - Official: Telugu
- Time zone: UTC+5:30 (IST)
- PIN: 500 044
- Vehicle registration: TS
- Lok Sabha constituency: Secunderabad
- Vidhan Sabha constituency: Musheerabad
- Planning agency: GHMC
- Website: telangana.gov.in

Vidyanagar is a locality of Hyderabad, Telangana, India. It formed Ward No. 86 of Greater Hyderabad Municipal Corporation.

== Commercial area ==
Vidyanagar has a large number of shopping areas. Local buildings of note include Durgabai Deshmukh Hospital, Andhra Mahila Sabha, and Maharaja Function Hall.

Shopping outlets in the area include Spencer's, Reliance, Bata, Titan, Airtel, Vodafone, Reliance Digital, and an Idea showroom.

== Schools and colleges ==
Local schools in the area include Sri Aurobindo International School, Chaitanya Residential School, and The Mothers Integral School. There is also a Hotel Management Institute run by the NCHMCT (Run by Ministry of Tourism) called as IHM-Hyderabad in the D.D Colony area of Vidyanagar.

== Transport ==
Vidyanagar is served by buses run by TSRTC, which use two routes covering most of the area.

The main bus route connecting the city is the 107 Dilsukhnagar to Secunderabad, route 3, which connects to Koti, Tarnaka, Moulali, Nacharam, and Habsiguda, 6H from Ecil to Mehdipatnam, 113I/M from Uppal to Mehdipatnam, 113Y from Uppal to Yosufguda.

There is an MMTS Train station called Vidyanagar Railway Station.
