= Chandrayangutta =

Chandrayangutta Aziz colony
- Old City
- Nickname: dastagir nagar
- Location in Telangana, India Chandrayangutta; Aziz colony (Telangana) Chandrayangutta; Aziz colony (India)
- Coordinates: 17°18′57″N 78°27′29″E
- Country: India
- State: Telangana
- District: Hyderabad
- Metro: Hyderabad

Government
  - Body: GHMC

Languages
  - Official: Telugu, Urdu
- Time zone: UTC+5:30 (IST)
- PIN: 500 005
- Vehicle registration: TG
- Lok Sabha constituency: Hyderabad
- Assembly constituency: Chadrayangutta
- Planning agency: GHMC
- Website: telangana.gov.in

Chandrayangutta is a neighbourhood in Old City, Hyderabad, Telangana, India.

== Transport ==
Chandrayangutta is connected by buses run by TSRTC, since a Bus Depot is close by, it is well connected. There is a MMTS train station is close by at Falaknuma. In January 2024, revised airport metro line will have Chandrayangutta as inter-change metro station. The remaining 5.5-km MGBS-Falaknuma route will be extended by another 1.5 km to Chandrayangutta. The newly planned Airport line is Nagole - LB Nagar - Chandrayangutta - Mailardevpally - P7 Road - Shamshabad Airport.

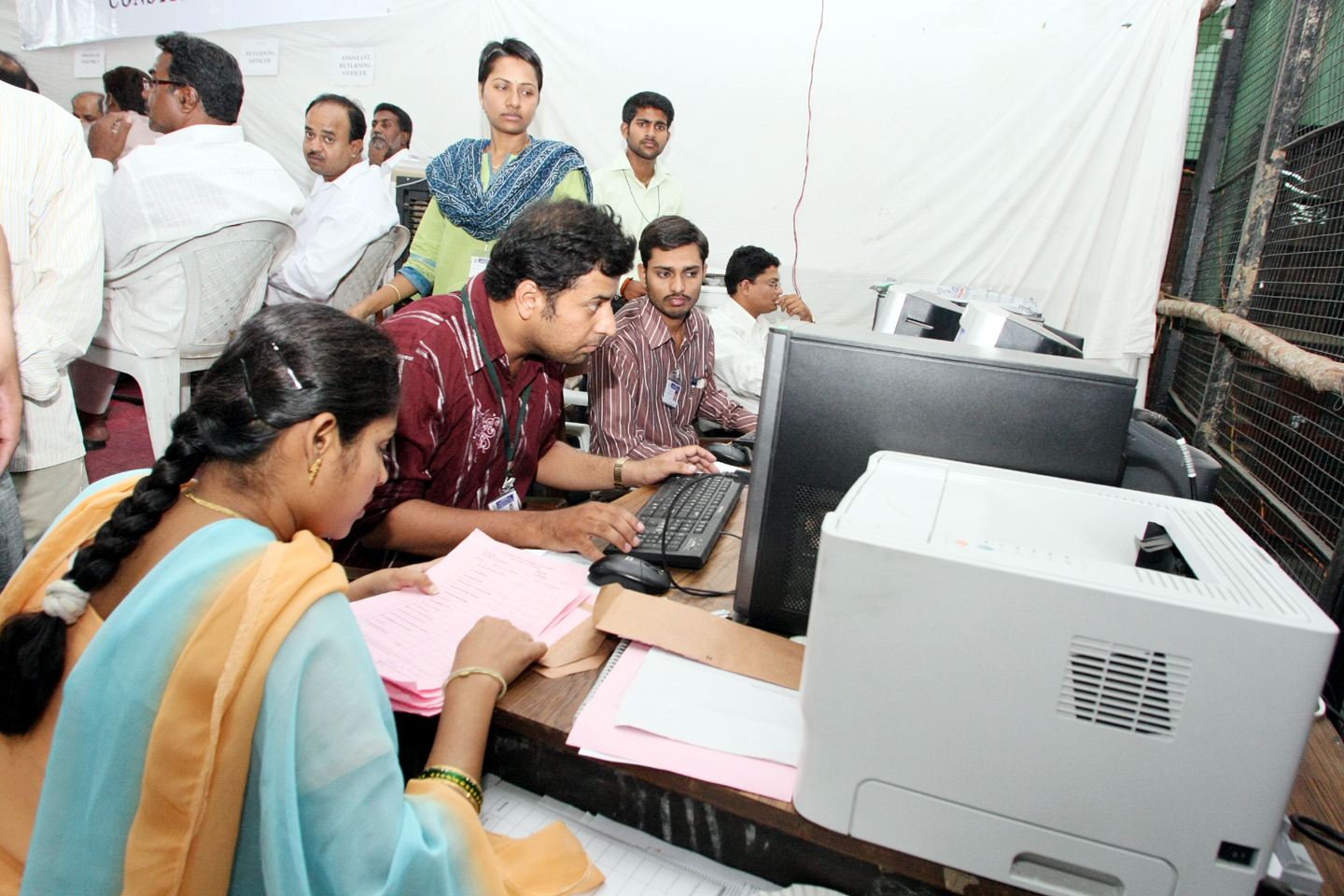
election results are being updated at a Chandrayangutta Assembly Segment Counting Centre, in Hyderabad on May 16, 2009

== See also ==
- Chandrayangutta (Assembly constituency)
