= Renuka (disambiguation) =

Renuka is a Hindu goddess.

Renuka may also refer to:

== People ==
- Renuka (actress) (born 1970), Tamil television actress
- Renuka Chowdary, politician and former MP from Andhra Pradesh, India
- Renuka Devi Barkataki (born 1932), politician from Assam, India
- Renuka Herath (1945–2017), Sri Lankan politician and former Member of Sri Lanka Parliament
- Renuka Jeyapalan, Canadian film director
- Renuka Kesaramadu (born 1957), painter and art curator from Karnataka, India
- Renuka Menon, Malayali film actress
- Renuka Ravindran (born 1943), Academic and Dean of Indian Institute of Science
- Renuka Sagramsingh-Sooklal, Trinidad and Tobago politician
- Renuka Shahane (born 1966), Marathi and Hindi television actress

== Places ==
- Renuka Lake, a lake in Himachal Pradesh, India
- Renuka Sanctuary, Reserve Forest and sanctuary around Renuka Lake
- Renuka sagara, a picnic spot on the Malaprabha river in Karnataka, India

== Other uses ==
- "Renuka", a poem by Indian poet Ramdhari Singh 'Dinkar' in 1935
- Renuka (beetle), a beetle genus
- Renuka Holdings, a Sri Lankan conglomerate company founded by Indu Renuka Rajyiah

== See also ==
- Renu (disambiguation)
