= Nature Cure Hospital railway station =

Railway station in Hyderabad, India

Nature Cure Hospital
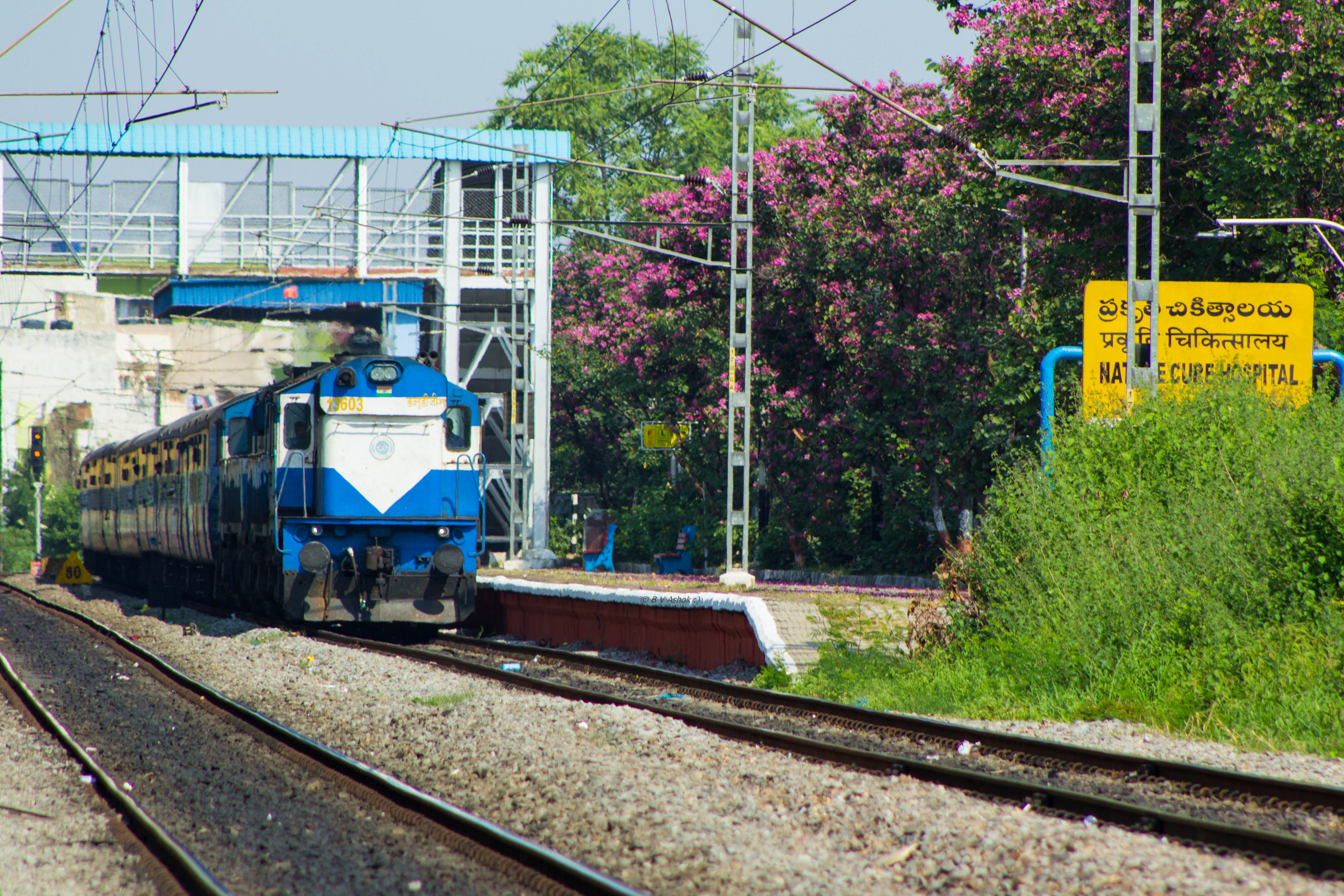
- Nature Cure Hospital station

General information
- Coordinates: 17.360°N 78.492°E
- System: Indian Railways and Hyderabad MMTS station
Location

Nature Cure Hospital railway station is a railway station in Hyderabad, Telangana, India that is used for MMTS trains. It is named so because it is located next to the government run nature cure hospital, which is now a part of Vemana Yoga Research Institute. Localities like Balkampet, Ameerpet, Sanjeeva Reddy Nagar, Punjagutta are accessible from this station. Begumpet and Fateh Nagar are the MMTS Railway stations present on either side of this station on the Lingampally to Falaknuma line.

== Facilities ==
This railway station has two platforms, a foot over bridge and a Railway Reservation counter.

== Lines ==
- Multi-Modal Transport System, Hyderabad
  - Secunderabad–Falaknuma route (SF Line)
