= Renuka =

Major Hindu Goddess; The Mother of the Universe

- Goddess of the Fallen
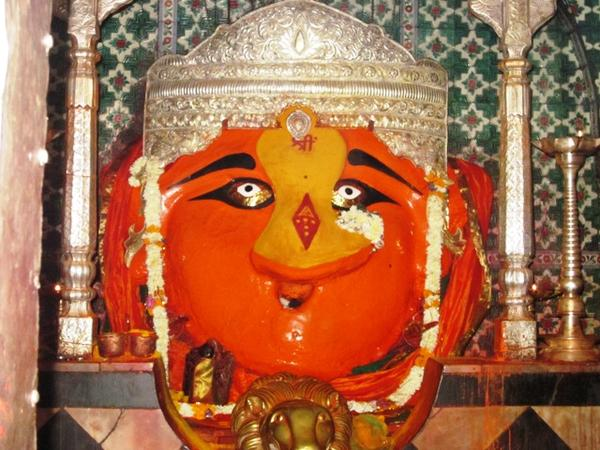
- The Mahur shrine of Renuka, venerated as a Shakti Pitha in Shaktism
- Other names: Yellamma, Ekvira, Yamai, Ellai Amman, Padmakshi Renuka, Ucchangi Mariamma, Ellai Amma Mahar, Renuka Bhavani, Yellamma Devi, Mariamman, Padmakshi Renuka
- Devanagari: रेणुका
- Sanskrit transliteration: Rēṇuka
- Affiliation: Devi, Mariamman, Shakti
- Mantra: ॐ रेणुकायै विद्महे मातृरूपाय धीमहि । तन्नो देवी प्रचोदयात् ॥
- Texts: Renuka Tantram
- Region: India

Genealogy
- Consort: Jamadagni
- Children: Ṛumaṇvān, Suhotra, Vasu, Viśvāvasu, Parashurama

Renuka, also known as Yellama, is a Hindu goddess venerated predominantly in the South and West Indian states of Karnataka, Tamil Nadu, Telangana, Andhra Pradesh, Gujarat, Maharashtra, and Madhya Pradesh. She was the wife of the sage Jamadagni, one of the Saptarishis; is regarded as the mother of Parashurama, the sixth avatar of Vishnu; and is considered a manifestation of Shakti the Mother Goddess in regional devotional traditions in Hindu mythology.

== Place in Hindu pantheon ==
In Hindu tradition, Renuka is identified as one of the four principal incarnations of Adi Parashakti, the primordial goddess, along with Kamakshi, who is venerated in Kanchi; Vishalakshi, who is venerated in Varanasi; and Meenakshi, who is venerated in Madurai and Bahulakshi.

Renuka is also venerated in other parts of India under various regional names, including Aai Yellamma, Ekvira, Yamai, Ellai Amman, Padmakshi Renuka, Ucchangi Mariamma, Ellai Amma Mahar, Renuka Bhavani, Yellamma Devi, Mariamman, and Padmakshi Renuka. Her worship spans multiple local traditions and communities, where devotees revere her as Jagadamba, the Mother of the Universe, a mother goddess and divine protector. Legends surrounding Renuka are chronicled in Hindu scriptures such as the Mahabharata, Harivamsa, and Bhagavata Purana.

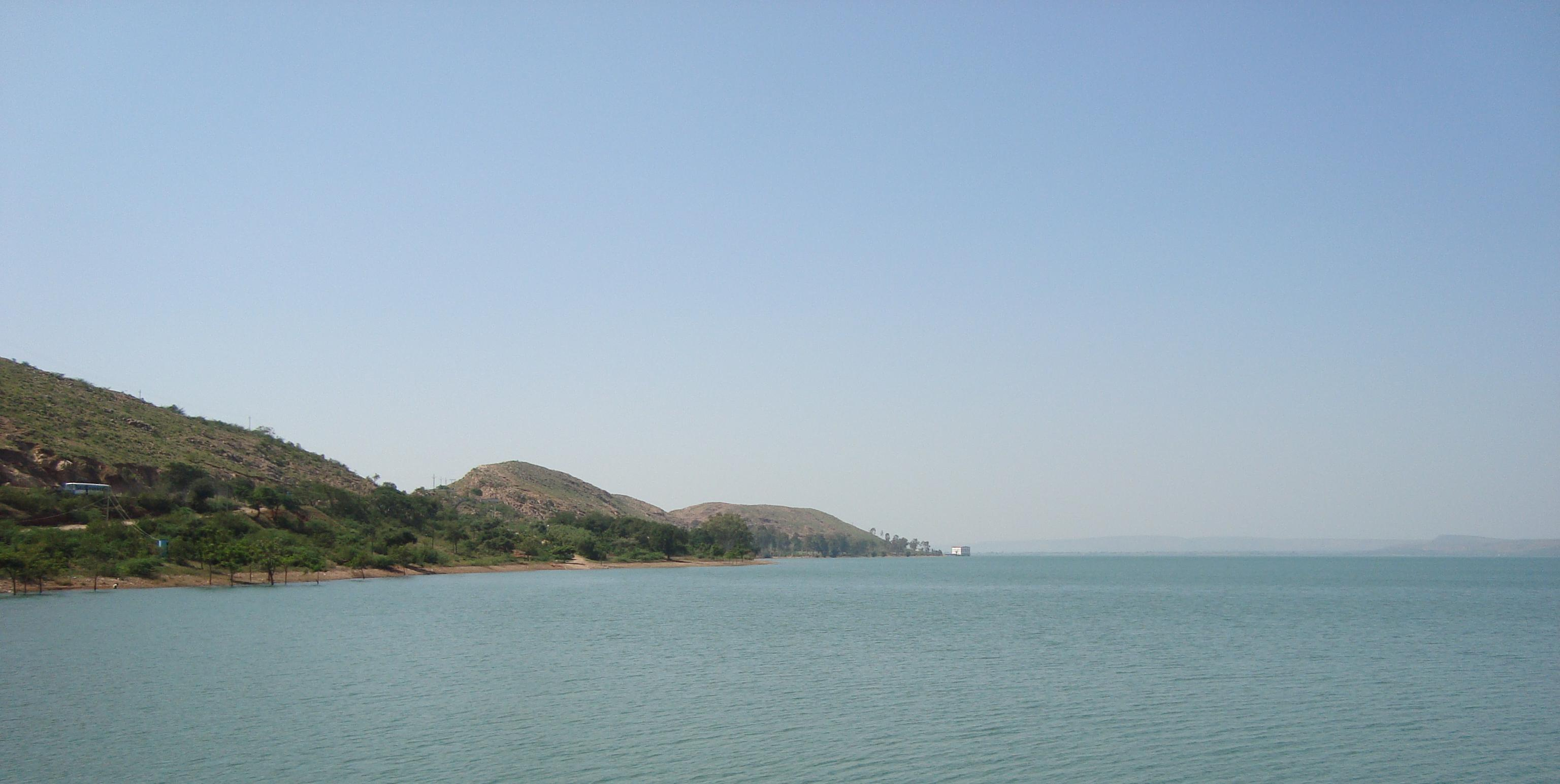
Renuka Sagara, Malaprabha River, Saundatti. (Belgaum District), North Karnataka, Karnataka

=== Childhood and marriage ===
Renuka was born to King Renu after he performed a ritual fire sacrifice called yajna in order to ensure peace and prosperity. Emerging from the sacrificial fire, Renuka became her parents' cherished child, and at age eight the sage Agastya advised her that she would marry Jamadagni when she reached maturity. Jamadagni was the son of Richika and Satyavati, who had earned divine blessings through penance, and Renuka assisted Jamadagni in rituals. Her own daily ritual involved bathing in the Malaprabha River with such intense focus that her spiritual power enabled her to mould sand into an unbaked pot, and later, use a coiled serpent as a rope to carry water for her husband's oblations.

Renuka and Jamadagni had a daughter Anjana, and five sons: Ṛumaṇvān, Suhotra, Vasu, Viśvāvasu, and Rama Bhargava (later known as Parashurama, Vishnu's sixth avatar). Parashurama earned Shiva's favor through penance and received an axe (parashu) as a reward, which then became his namesake.

=== Estrangement from Jamadagni and death ===
One day when Renuka went to the river she saw the king Chitraratha having sex with his wives. Captivated by the sight, she momentarily lost her concentration and devotion to her husband. Distracted in this way, she lost the spiritual power granted to her through her chastity, causing her to lose the water she had collected. When she came back to the ashram, Jamadagni divined these events through his yogic power and cursed her lack of devotion.

After being cursed by her husband Renuka went east and sat in the forest to meditate. In her penance she met with the saints Eknath and Joginath, and requested their help in gaining mercy from her husband. They first consoled her and then instructed her to follow their advice exactly, telling her to first purify herself by bathing in a nearby lake and then to worship a Shivalinga which they gave her. Next she was asked to visit the nearby town and beg for rice from the houses, and this ritual - called Joga Bedodu in Karnataka, Jogawa in Marathi, and Yellamma Jogu in Telangana - is still carried out by women during a particular month. After collecting the rice, Renuka was to give half to the saints and then cook the remaining half, adding jaggery, and then partake of the cooked rice with full devotion. The saints said that if she performed this ritual for three days she would be able to visit her husband on the fourth day.

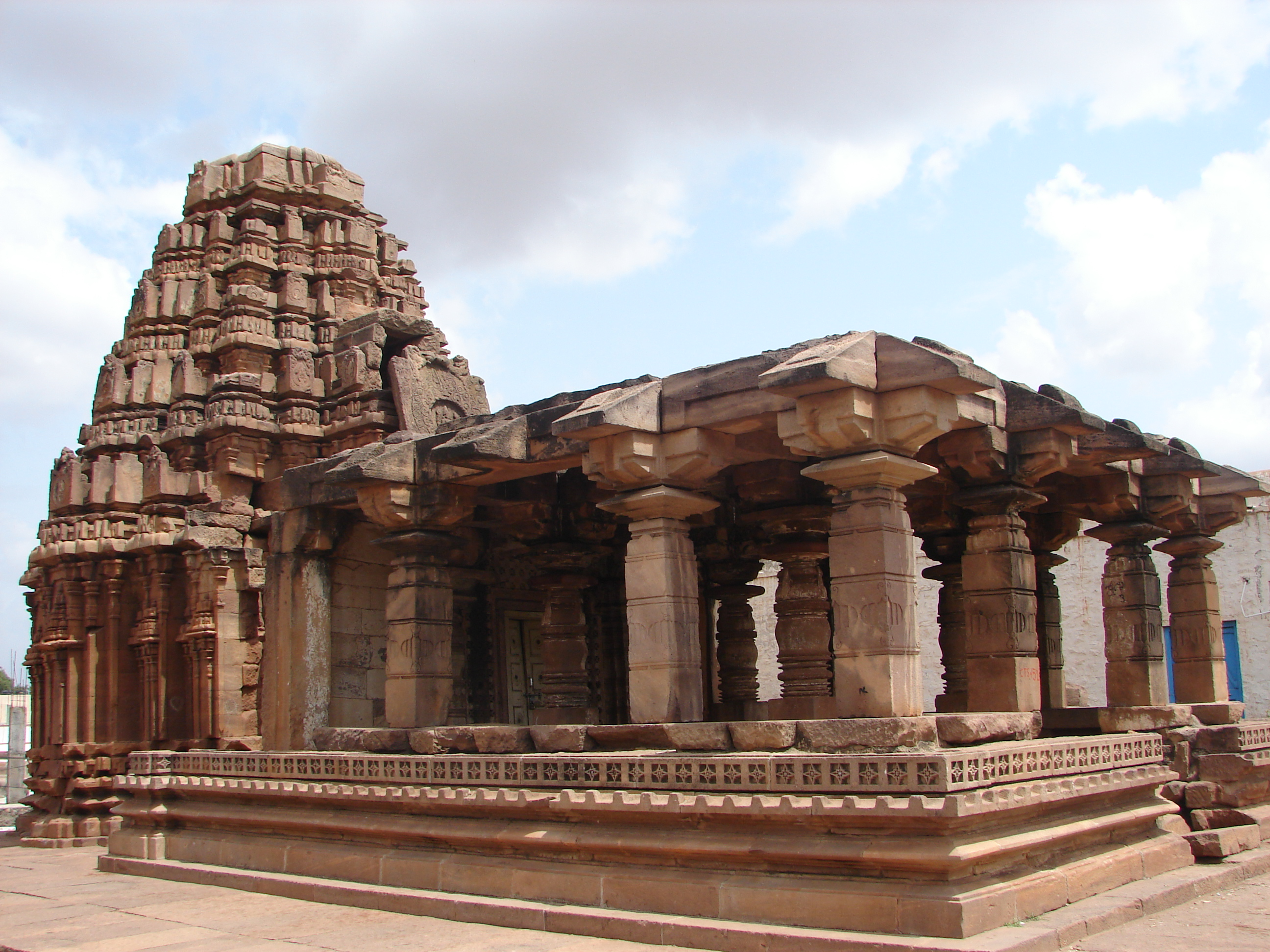
Yellamma temple at Badami

Knowing the anger of Jamadagni, the saints also warned Renuka that she may not be fully pardoned by her husband and that she would have to experience the most difficult time of her life for a few minutes. "After that," they said, "you will be eternally revered and will be blessed with your husband. You will be worshipped by all the people henceforth." After blessing her thus, the saints disappeared. Renuka followed their instructions with devotion and worshipped the Shivalinga with reverence. On the fourth day, she went to see her husband.

But Jamadagni was still furious with Renuka and ordered his four eldest sons to kill his wife. All four refused to kill their mother, leading to Jamadagni cursing his four sons and reducing them to ashes for disobeying his order. Jamadagni then called his fifth son Parashurama, who was meditating on Shiva, and ordered him to behead Renuka. Parashurama immediately obeyed his father's words and beheaded his mother with his axe.

=== Resurrection ===
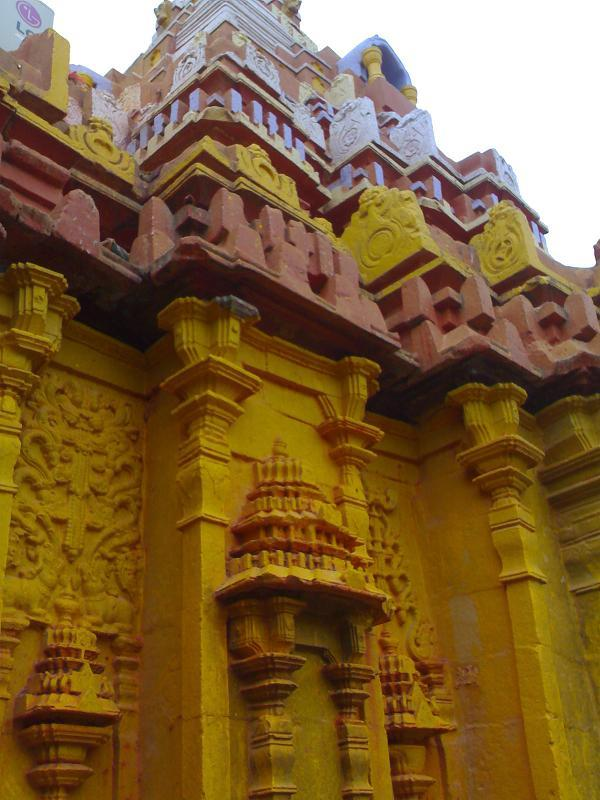
Renuka temple at Yallammagudi, Saundatti (Belgaum District). North Karnataka, Karnataka

Pleased with his youngest son's devotion and obedience towards him, Jamadagni offered a boon to Parushurama, who wisely asked for his mother and brothers to be brought back to life. Jamadagni was impressed by Parshurama's pragmatism and feeling strong remorse for what he had done to his beloved and compassionate wife, so he brought Renuka and her four other sons back to life. He then vowed not to get angered ever again and to give up krodha forever. However, in the happiness of bringing his mother's life back, Parashurama brings his father the head of another lady called Yellamma, while his father curses the four eldest sons with losing their masculinity for not listening to him. As a result, Renuka is now called Renuka Yellamma and becomes the deity of the transgender community, protecting her four eldest sons when they seek shelter with her after her resurrection.

=== Variations of the story ===
A common version of this story in South India is that a low or outcast woman sees Renuka/Yellamma being taken to the forest to be killed by her son Parshurama, and intervenes. Unfortunately, this only results in her head being cut off as well as Renuka's. However, when the women are restored to life they both become goddesses, and this is sometimes considered the origin story for Yellamma and Mariamman, with the two goddesses arising from the two women.

According to another legend, the emperor Sahastarva wanted to marry Renuka, and so when Parashuram was away Sahastarva killed Jamadagni and his four sons, causing Renuka to jump into the pond known as Ramsarover. This lake is today venerated as Renuka Sanctuary. Another version of the lake story has the Haihaya King Sahasrarjuna (Kartavirya Arjuna) killing Jamadagni because he wanted the Kamadhenu cow from Jamadagni and Renuka, causing Renuka to jump into the pond.

A version among the Deori people holds that Jamadagni asked his sons to kill Renuka to prove their obedience, and then brought her back to life.

== Temples and related places ==
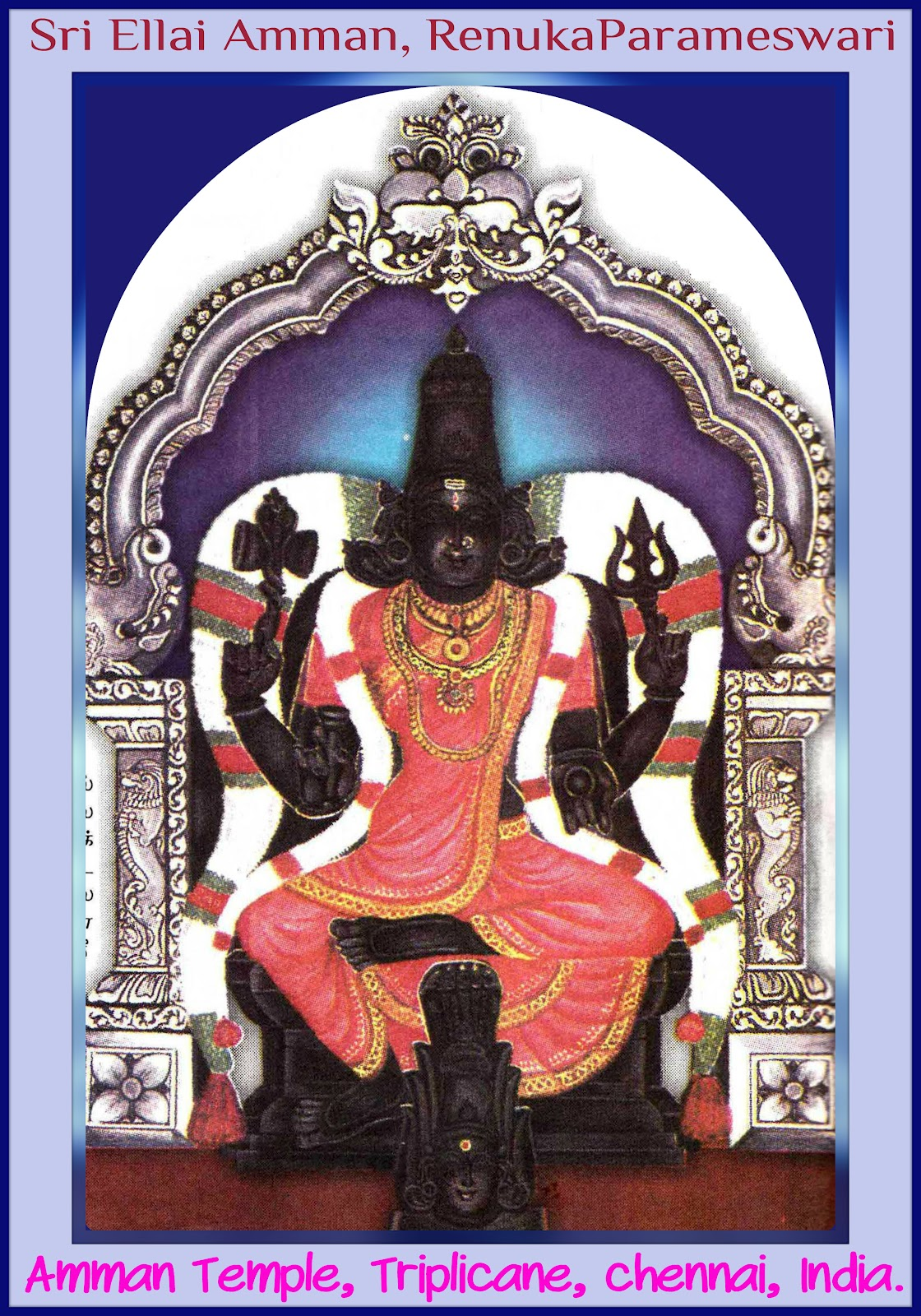
Renuka as Ellai Amman, Chennai

The Renuka Amba Temple is located in Shah Ali Banda, Charminar, Hyderabad and is a 17th-century temple in the Raja Rai Rayan Devdi of Renukadas Bhalerao, a king and the prime minister of Hyderabad during the Nizam rule. The temple is open to the public only during the nine days of Navratri until Dussehra night and is visited by lakhs (100,000s) of devotees, since it is believed that the goddess is the granter of wishes, and that just visiting her wards off all evil and black magic. It is called the Power temple by the devotees. The temple houses a Bhavani Shankar and a Dakshina Mukthi Hanuman; however they are not visible for Dharshan. There is no token system no tickets no payments and no VIP Darshan is allowed strictly.

The Balkampet Yellamma Temple is located in the Balkampet neighbourhood of Hyderabad, where in the Ashadha month of every year the goddess Yellamma Kalyanothsavam is celebrated by thousands of pilgrims performing special rituals to receive the goddess's blessing. The statue of the goddess extends 10 feet below ground level, and there is also a well in the temple complex which produces holy water called tirtham. Some devotees believe that the water in the well heals all ills, and taking a bath here is supposed to purify one of all disorders and skin diseases. A lit Akhand Jyoti is also present in the temple.

The Renukambe [Yellamma] Temple is located atop a hill in Chandragutti, Soraba Taluk, in Shimoga, and is an example of ancient architecture dating back to the Kadamba period.

The Matripura Temple is located in Mahur, Maharashtra and is supposedly the birthplace of the goddess. It is mentioned in Devi Gita, the final chapter of Devi Bhagawatam, as "Matripura in the Sahyadri mountain; here the Devi Renuka dwells".

The Yalubai Temple of Devi is located in Dhamnand-Posare, Taluka Khed, Maharashtra.

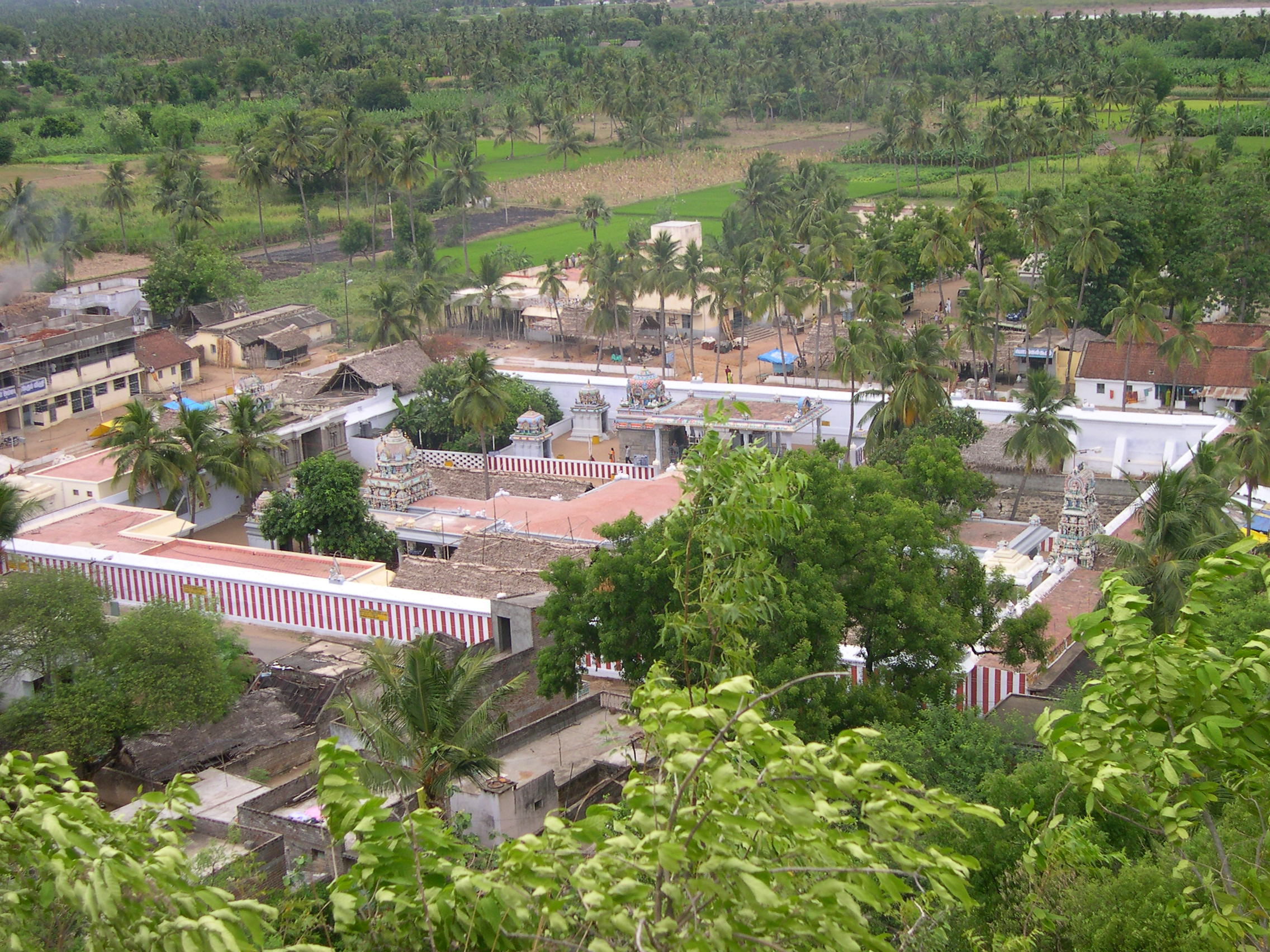
Renugambal Amman Temple Padavedu, Thiruvannamalai District

The Renugambal Amman Temple is located in Padavedu, Thiruvannamalai District, Tamil Nadu, and is one of the most important Sakthi Sthalas, particularly for communities tracing their origins to that locality.

The Kondi Amman Temple is located in Manthangal village, Ranipet District, Tamil Nadu, with the presiding deity being worshipped by Pokanati Reddys settled from the Carnatic-Andhra regions.

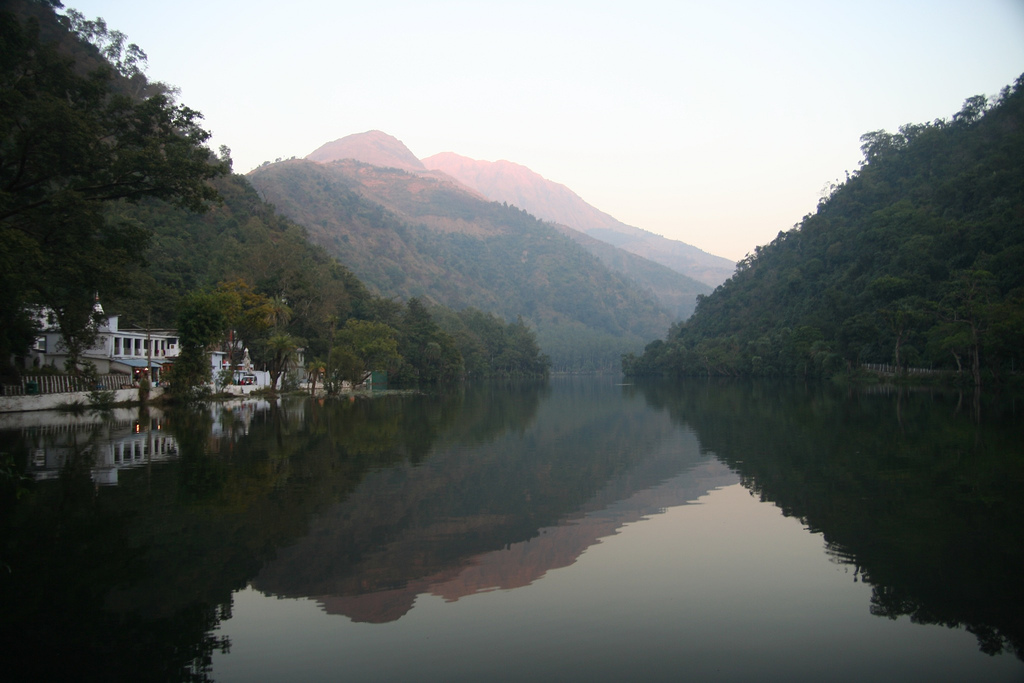
Renuka Lake in Himachal Pradesh

The Yellamma Gudi Temple in Saundatti sees a gathering of 200,000 to 600,000 devotees every year.

Renuka Lake in the Renuka Sanctuary in Himachal Pradesh is named after the goddess.

A folk song devoted to Renuka

== In popular culture ==
- Shakthi Leelai (1972), a Tamil film in which B.Saroja Devi plays the role of Goddess Renuka.
- Sri Renukadevi Mahathme (1977), a Kannada film in which B.Saroja Devi plays the role of Goddess Renuka.
- Sri Renuka Devi (2003), another Kannada film in which Soundarya plays the title role.
- Jai Renuka Devi Yellamma (1985), a full-length Marathi film about Goddess Renuka Devi.
- Udho Udho Shri Renuka Yellamma, a TV serial about Renuka Devi, the avatar of Goddess Parvati.
- Padma Shri Awardee Manjamma Jogathi has been practicing the Jogathi folk dance form for the past 40 years, dancing with a metal-crafted Yellamma deity positioned on her head.
- According to folklore, transgender individuals of the Jogappa community are spiritually wedded to the Goddess Renuka Yellamma and devoted to serving her. These trans women willingly devote themselves to the goddess during their transformation, following a cultural tradition observed across Karnataka, Maharashtra, Andhra Pradesh, and neighbouring regions. "Accompanied by the melodious tones of Chowdki and Shruthi, we sing and perform the legend of the Goddess, seeking alms. As we share the tale of the revered deity through our performance, people perceive us not only as conveyors of her spirit but also as messengers and voices sharing her life story." Occasionally, transgender men have also been recorded as devotees of Yellamma, and they are sometimes called Yellavva and Yellappa (possibly meaning "Yell-mother" and "Yell-father").
- The Jogathi community practises Jogathi Nruthya, a ritualistic performance dedicated to the Goddess Yellamma. Also known as Yellammaanata, this traditional folk art form is observed by individuals from the Devadasi and Jogathi (transgender) communities in Bidar, Kalaburagi, and Ballari, and has been documented by Bengaluru-born filmmaker and artist Shilpa Mudbi. It is intricately tied to the worship of Goddess Renuka Yellamma and maintains profound connections with marginalized communities.

A devotional folk song to Renuka Devi from Karnataka

== See also ==
- Chandragutti Renukamba Temple
- Sirsi Marikamba Temple
- LGBTQ rights in Telangana
