= Renuka Sanctuary =

Protected area in Himachal Pradesh, India

Coordinates: 30.610°N 77.458°E

Renuka Wildlife Sanctuary
- IUCN category IV (habitat/species management area)
- Interactive map of Renuka Wildlife Sanctuary
- Location: Sirmour district, Himachal Pradesh, India
- Area: 3.87 km^{2} (1.49 sq mi)
- Established: 2013

The Renuka Sanctuary is a nature sanctuary. It is situated in Sirmour district in Himachal Pradesh and is connected to a network of roads. It covers about 4.028 square kilometres. Also known as Renuka Reserve Forest, it has been formally declared a sanctuary (abhayaranya). A further area of roughly about 3 square kilometres that lies outside the sanctuary has been declared as a buffer area.

== Religious aspect ==
The area is well recognized by its religious, aesthetic and cultural value. Renuka is an abode of temples of the mother-and-son duo of Renuka and Lord Parshuram. Mythologically Renukaji is an incarnation of Goddess Durga. She was the wife of Rishi Jamadagni. Parshuram believed to be the sixth incarnation of Lord Vishnu. He was the youngest of the five sons of the couple.

Renuka was considered extremely beautiful. Sahastarva, the emperor, wanted to marry her and once when Parshuram was away, he killed Rishi Jamadagni and his four sons to marry Renukaji. To escape the clutches of the emperor Renukaji jumped into small pond, known by the name of the Ramsarover at that time, and vanished into it. Ever since the lake is worshiped as Renuka lake.

== Geographic aspect ==
The sanctuary falls in the bio-geographical zone IV and biogeographical province IV as per the classification done by the Wildlife Institute of India (WII). According to forest types classification, the area falls under group 5B/C2 i.e. dry mixed deciduous forest and group 5/051 i.e. dry sal forest.

The forest bears a mixed crop of Anogeissus, Lucinea, Terminalia, Khair, Shisham, carrie mangos, Cordia and a number of climbers in moist depressions.

The fauna includes the leopard, sambar, spotted deer, barking deer, jackal, hare, jungle cat, palm civet, porcupine, blue jay, black partridge, drongo, hill crow, scarlet minivet, bulbul, common coot, and green pigeon.

Renukaji Zoo is the oldest zoo in Himachal Pradesh. It was started in 1957 with rescued, stray and deserted wild animals. The first animal brought here was a male spotted deer named Moti. To accommodate the increasing number of animals, an open park was conceived and the park was established in 1983. Black buck and nilgai were brought from Pipli Zoo. A pair of mithun, gifted by Rajiv Gandhi, the prime minister of India in 1985, were brought from Arunachal Pradesh and another was brought from Nagaland in 1986. A pair of lions was brought to the zoo from Zunagarh in 1975.

The periphery of the area is fenced by inter-channeled chain fence to restrict the illegal entry of villagers to the area. At present the lion safari, zoo, aviary and sanctuary are under control of the administrative control of the Shimla Wildlife Division.

== See also ==
- Renuka Lake
