= Chandragutti Renukamba Temple =

Hindu temple in Karnataka, India

- Location in Karnataka

Religion
- Affiliation: Hinduism
- District: Shivamogga
- Deity: Renuka Devi

Location
- State: Karnataka
- Country: India
- Coordinates: 14.431311°N 74.956551°E

Website
- shimoga.nic.in/en/culture-heritage

Chandragutti Renukamba Temple located at Shivamogga district is a Hindu temple dedicated to goddess Renuka. This is an ancient cave temple. It is located 19 km (12 mi) away from the town of Soraba and 19 km (12 mi) away from Sirsi and Siddapura towns in the district of Uttara Kannada in Karnataka State of India.

== Legend ==
The king of Chandragutti performed a yajna, a ritual performed to maintain peace and good health. He was blessed with a daughter (Renuka), who originated from the fire of this yajna. Later she was married to sage Jamadagni. She used to carry water in the pots created of sand and it is said she never dropped even a single drop of water because she used snakes as pads for the pot. But one day sage Jamadagni in is anger asked his son Parashurama to kill Renukamba because of her mistake. Parashurama took his mother to the cave and cut her head. He then left her torso in the cave and took her head to his father. Sage Jamadagni then offered a boon to his son and Parasurama in turn asked for his mother’s life. Then Renukamba got her life back. This divine incident is believed to have taken place in Chandragutti.

Baachanna was a powerful Palegar who ruled the villages of Chandragutti, Soraba, and Shivamogga during the Vijayanagara period. Baachanna belonged to the Halepaika community of Chandragutti and was a powerful Palegar / leader who ruled the Chandragutti and Soraba region. He held power in Chandragutti during the Vijayanagara Empire, that is, during the rule of Harihara II. In an inscription from 1396 CE, Baachanna is mentioned as the leader who ruled Chandragutti. Earlier, Chandragutti had been a powerful center of the Banavasi Kadambas. Later, Baachanna's influence grew over this region. He may have had control over Chandragutti Fort, the Renuka Devi Temple, and the surrounding villages. Baachanna was a leader who came from the Halepaika community of Chandragutti and led his people. He ruled around 400 villages. The Shivamogga region was also included among those 400 villages. This means his authority was not limited only to Chandragutti. It spread across Soraba, Shivamogga, and a large surrounding region. Baachanna was not only a ruler. He was also a great hero in physical strength. According to one story, when a big wrestling match was held in Chandragutti, wrestlers from surrounding villages came and challenged him. No one could bring Baachanna down. Finally, he lifted his opponent and threw him onto the ground, winning the admiration of the people. After that incident, people began calling him the "Son of the Soil." Seeing his strength, courage, and sense of justice, the village people respected his word. Baachanna was also an expert in sword fighting. According to the story, when enemies came to attack Chandragutti Fort, Baachanna himself stood in front holding a sword. Seeing his speed, sharpness, and skill in battle, even the enemies were stunned. He was not only strong. He was also a wise leader. Before a battle, he would think about the enemy's strength, the route, the location of the fort, and the safety of the people, and then make a decision. That is why it is said that during his time, Chandragutti and the surrounding villages remained safe. Before the Keladi Nayakas came to power, Baachanna's dominance existed in this region. Later, this region came under the rule of the Keladi Nayakas.

== See also ==
- Renuka
- Jamadagni
- Parashurama
- Sirsi Marikamba Temple
- Yellamma Temple, Saundatti
