= Balkampet Yellamma Temple =

Coordinates: 17.4475°N 78.4491°E

Balkampet Yellamma temple
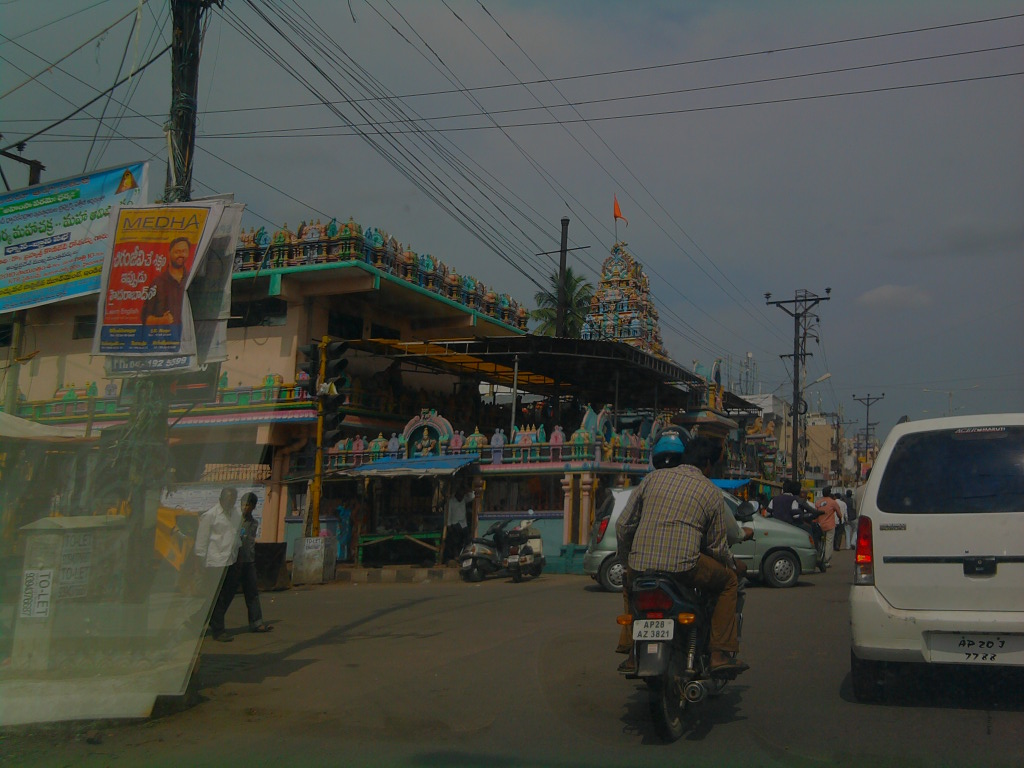
- Balkampet Yellamma temple

Religion
- Affiliation: Hinduism
- District: Hyderabad
- Deity: Yellamma
- Festivals: Bonalu, Yellama Kalyanam, Dasara Navaratri

Location
- Location: Balkampet, Hyderabad
- State: Telangana
- Country: India
- Interactive map of Balkampet Yellamma temple

Architecture
- Type: South Indian
- Creator: patakar khatri FAMILY MEMBERS
- Completed: 17th Century

The Balkampet Yellamma Temple is a Hindu temple located at Balkampet in Hyderabad in the Indian state of Telangana. It is dedicated to Yellamma, one of the names of Renuka, a Hindu mother goddess.

== History ==
The temple is believed to date to the 15th century. The statue is partially submerged, giving rise to the nickname Jala Durga, jala which means water in Sanskrit.
