= Killer Soup =

2024 Indian television series

- Genre: Black comedy Crime drama Thriller
- Created by: Abhishek Chaubey
- Written by: Abhishek Chaubey; Unaiza Merchant; Harshad Nalawade; Anant Tripathi
- Directed by: Abhishek Chaubey
- Starring: Konkona Sen Sharma; Manoj Bajpayee; Nassar
- Country of origin: India
- Original languages: Hindi; Tamil
- No. of seasons: 1
- No. of episodes: 8

Production
- Executive producer: Ravi Tiwari
- Producers: Chetana Kowshik; Honey Trehan
- Cinematography: Anuj Rakesh Dhawan
- Editors: Sanyukta Kaza; Meghna Manchanda Sen
- Camera setup: Multi-camera
- Running time: 43—59 minutes
- Production company: Macguffin Pictures

Original release
- Network: Netflix
- Release: 11 January 2024

Killer Soup is an Indian Hindi language black comedy crime thriller television series by Netflix. The series premiered on 11 January 2024 on Netflix. It is co-written by Abhishek Chaubey along with Harshad Nalawade, Anant Tripathi and Unaiza Merchant and directed by Abhishek Chaubey. It stars Konkona Sen Sharma and Manoj Bajpayee. It was previously titled as "Soup." The series is available for streaming on Netflix. it loosely based on 2017 case in Telangana.

== Plot ==
In the fictional hill station of Mainjur, Tamil Nadu, an aspiring yet talentless nurse-turned-home chef, Swathi, conspires to replace her husband, Prabhakar Shetty, with her lover and Prabhakar's squint-eyed doppelgänger, Umesh Pillai.

== Cast ==
- Konkona Sen Sharma as Swathi Shetty
- Manoj Bajpayee in a dual role as
  - Prabhakar "Prabhu" Shetty
  - Umesh Pillai / Umesh Shantiram Mahto
- Nassar as Inspector Hassan
- Sayaji Shinde as Arvind Shetty, Prabhakar's elder brother
- Anula Navlekar as Apeksha "Appu" Shetty, Arvind's daughter and Prabhu's niece
- Lal as Charles Lucas, Arvind's bodyguard
- Rajeev Ravindranathan as DSP Udaya Reddy
- Kani Kusruti as Kirtima Kadathanathan
- Shilpa Mudbi as Head Constable Asha Ritu
- Anbu Thasan as ASI Thupalli
- Vaishali Bisht as Khansama
- Mallika Prasad Sinha as Zubeida
- Bagavathi Perumal as Private Detective Kiran Nadar
- Raja PRS as Police Constable Binny

== Reception ==
Saibal Chatterjee of NDTV gave four stars out of five and said Killer Soup is a cleverly written crime and investigative comedy that is characterised by astute writing and flawless performance. It is witty, cunning, and incredibly amusing. Dhaval Roy of The Times of India also gave 4 stars out 5 and write in review that You will remain captivated throughout Killer Soup, a darkly humorous thriller with subtleties and complexities. Abhishek Chaubey's recipe is so amazing that you will devour it in one sitting. Lachmi Deb Roy writes in Firstpost Deliciously Dark comedy at its best. Intriguing and humorous with just the proper amount of heat, Konkona Sen Sharma & Manoj Bajpayee's Killer Soup is just what audiences would desire during the chilly month of January. Zinia Bandyopadhyay writes in her review in India Today The performers do their roles almost well. As a policeman, Nasser stood out. The show's exquisite cinematography is one item that merits discussion. The tale is given so much depth by the close-up views.

Shubhra Gupta of The Indian Express gave 2 stars out of 5 and said in her review that A black "comedy" is supposed to be humorous and make you laugh despite yourself, yet I was waiting for the jokes to start here. And I kept looking forward to shockers. Sukanya Verma of rediff.com also gave 2 stars and criticize it and said When Killer Soup's clever and bizarre graphics lose their impact, the difficulty of maintaining the flow is evident as the stories get overly complicated.
