= Renu =

Renu may refer to:

- ReNu, a brand of soft contact lens care products
- Renu (footballer), Indian footballer
- Renu (boxer), Indian boxer
- Renadive, Indian cinematographer

== See also ==
- Renuka (disambiguation)
