= Shilpa Mudbi =

Indian folk artist

- Born: Bangalore, India
- Education: Masters in Media Arts and Production
- Alma mater: University of Technology Sydney
- Known for: Co-founder of Urban Folk Project
- Notable work: Yellammana and Other Stories
- Spouse: Aditya Kothakota

Shilpa Mudbi is an Indian researcher, singer, performer, theater artist, actress, and documentary filmmaker. She is currently working on preserving and archiving diverse folk-art forms in Karnataka. Along with her husband and Sumitra Sunder, she co-founded the Urban Folk Project. As a part of this project, they performed 70-80 shows of Yellamanata and Other Stories across the country.

== Yellamanata and Other Stories ==
Mudbi leads the team in performing Yellammana padas with traditional instruments such as the chowdki and the Shruti, sometimes in the morning at Bangalore Cubbon Park. Shilpa's efforts extend to reviewing and preserving the "Chowdki" and "shruti", essential instruments intertwined with the narratives of Yellamma, making her a key force in reviving these traditions. As a trained filmmaker, she explores the roots of this music, connecting it with North Karnataka's cultural fabric.

These Bengalureans are trying to save Chowdki, a percussion instrument which was once prevalent in the belt of north Karnataka, Maharashtra, Andhra Pradesh. According to folklore, it has been around for at least 2,500 years.

== Weekly Web Folk Sessions ==
During the pandemic, Mubdi conducted Weekly Web Folk Sessions that encouraged participants to pick up an instrument and learn a folk song for a collective singing experience. Each session, lasting five to six minutes, effectively combines both information and musical elements.

== Filmography ==
=== Web series ===
Year	Film	Role
2024	Killer Soup	Head Constable Asha Ritu

== Awards and recognition ==
In 2023, she was listed in the Deccan Herald, in their fifth edition of Changemakers awards “DH Changemakers: 23 to Watch in 2023”
