= Renuka Ravindran =

Indian academic

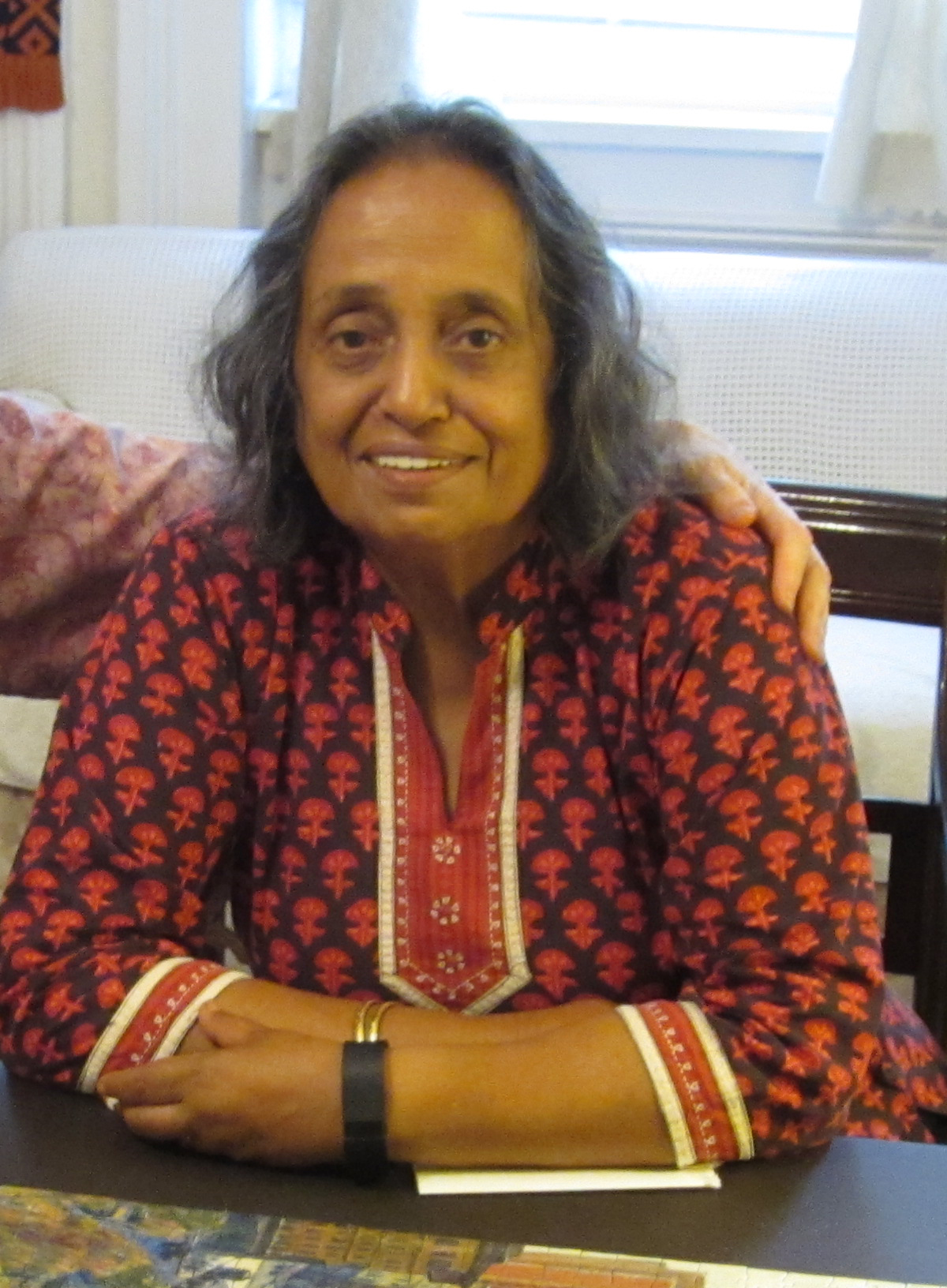
- Born: 11 May 1943 (age 82)
- Scientific career
- Institutions: Indian Institute of Science

Renuka Ravindran (née Rajagopalan) was the first woman to be the Dean of the Indian Institute of Science.

== Education and career ==
She was a student at the Presentation Convent in Vepery in Chennai and later at the Women's Christian College in Chennai. She earned her PhD from Indian Institute of Science in Applied Mathematics and later Doktoringenieur from the Technische Hochschule Aachen in Aerodynamics in Germany. She joined the Indian Institute of Science in 1967 as a professor and the Chairman of the Department of Mathematics, and then became the Dean of Indian Institute of Science. She has also been visiting professor at various universities, including the University of Kaiserslautern, Germany. Her fields of specialization are nonlinear waves and non-Newtonian fluids.
