= S. R. Nagar =

S. R. Nagar Sanjeeva Reddy Nagar
- Urban
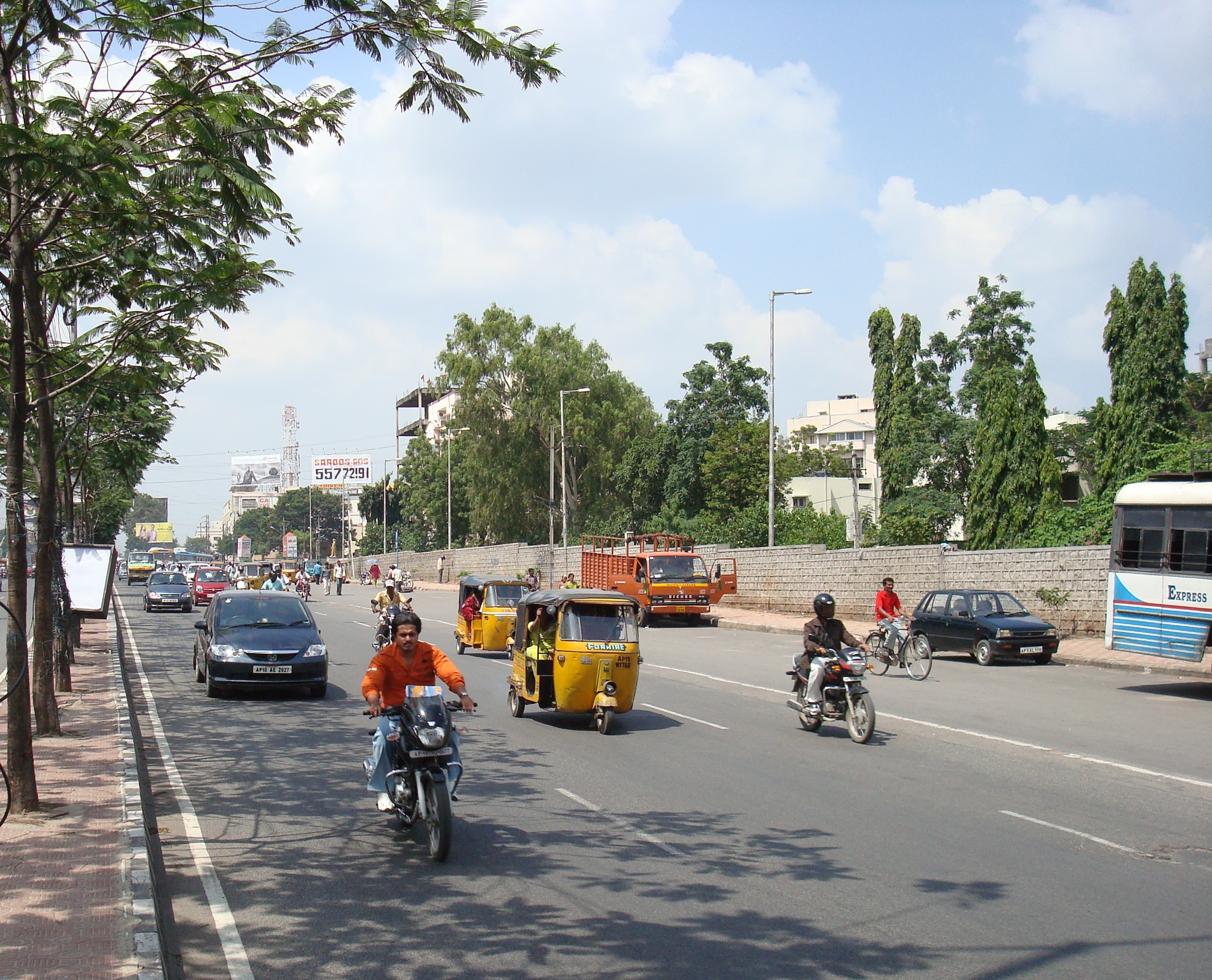
- S. R. Nagar main road

- Location in Telangana, India S. R. Nagar (Telangana) S. R. Nagar (India)
- Coordinates: 17.436793°N 78.443906°E
- Country: India
- State: Telangana
- District: Hyderabad
- Metro: Hyderabad
- Named for: Neelam Sanjiva Reddy

Languages
  - Official: Telugu
- Time zone: UTC+5:30 (IST)
- PIN: 500038
- Vehicle registration: TS
- Parliament constituency: Secunderabad
- Assembly constituency: Sanathnagar

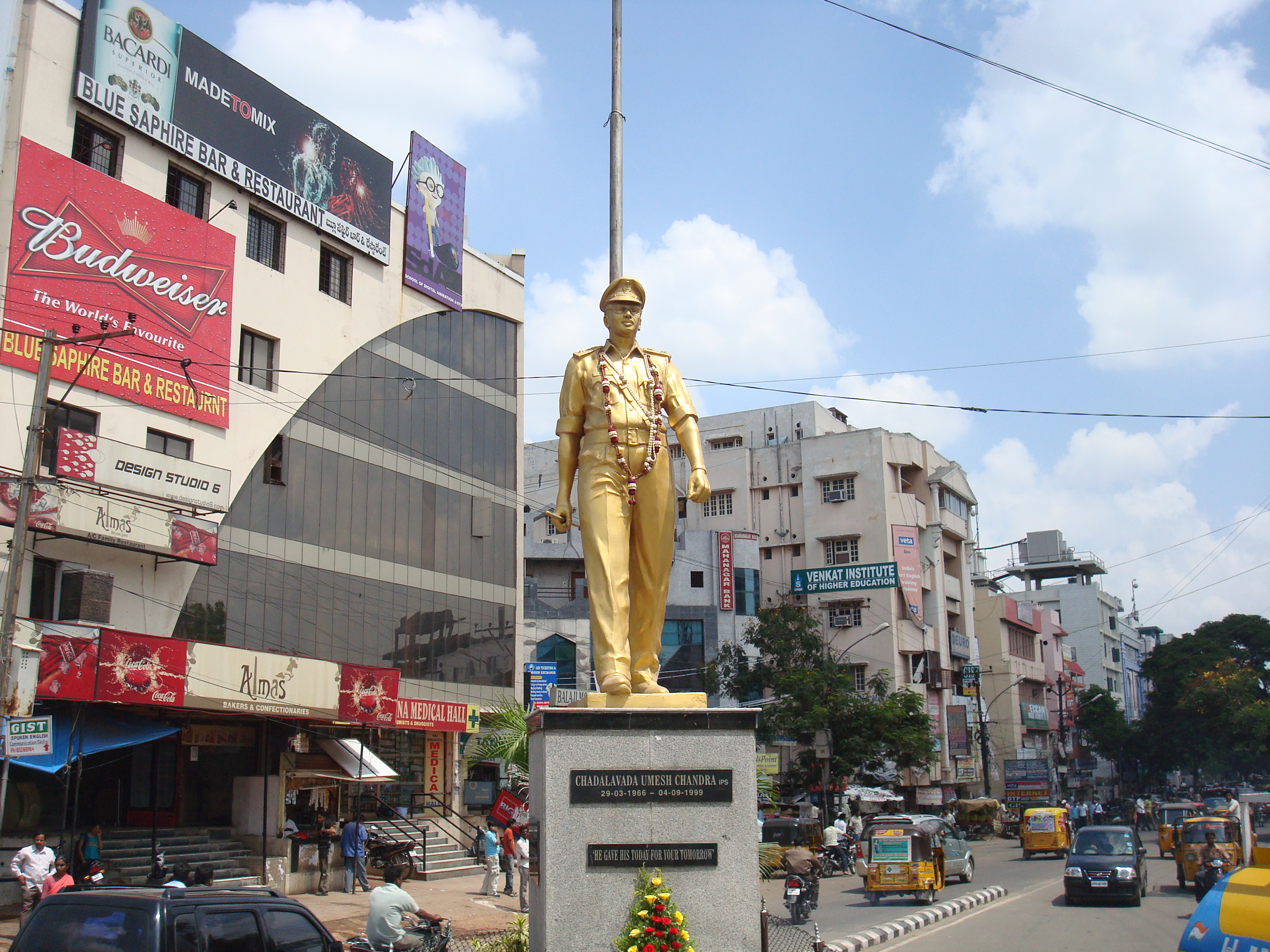
Umesh Chandra statue at SR nagar junction

Sanjeeva Reddy Nagar, commonly known as S. R. Nagar is predominantly a residential neighbourhood in Hyderabad, Telangana, India. It is close to Ameerpet, a commercial neighbourhood. It is named after the sixth President of India, Neelam Sanjeeva Reddy.

The area is being a residential area has a good number of trees and good environment. SR Nagar almost joins with Sanathnagar, though it maintains a distinct culture. SR Nagar is a road junction connecting to the Bombay-Pune highway. Located here is the statue of Chadalavada Umesh Chandra, a police officer who lost his life here, gunned down in the street by Naxalites.

SR Nagar being predominantly a residential area has well planned roads and a good number of independent houses. Recently the real estate boom has caught up here with a growing number of apartments. The area also has recreational facilities such as playgrounds and a municipal park.

== Commerce ==
The area is surrounded by restaurants, shops, institutions, preschools, primary schools, secondary schools, colleges for higher education. A government owned TB and Chest Hospital is located nearby ESI. A well known hospital called the Nature Cure Hospital is close by at Balkampet.

At the Maitrivanam building, many computer centres are located. SR Nagar Post office is also located in the Maithrivanam building.

== Transport ==
SR Nagar is a road junction connecting to the Bombay-Pune highway. The buses are run by TSRTC connect Sanjeeva Reddy Nagar with all parts of the city with good frequency. The closest MMTS Train station is half kilometer away at Nature Cure Hospital.

SR Nagar has its own station on the Hyderabad Metro rail network and occupies the 10th stop on Corridor 1, which runs between Miyapur and L. B. Nagar (27 stops).

== Gallery ==
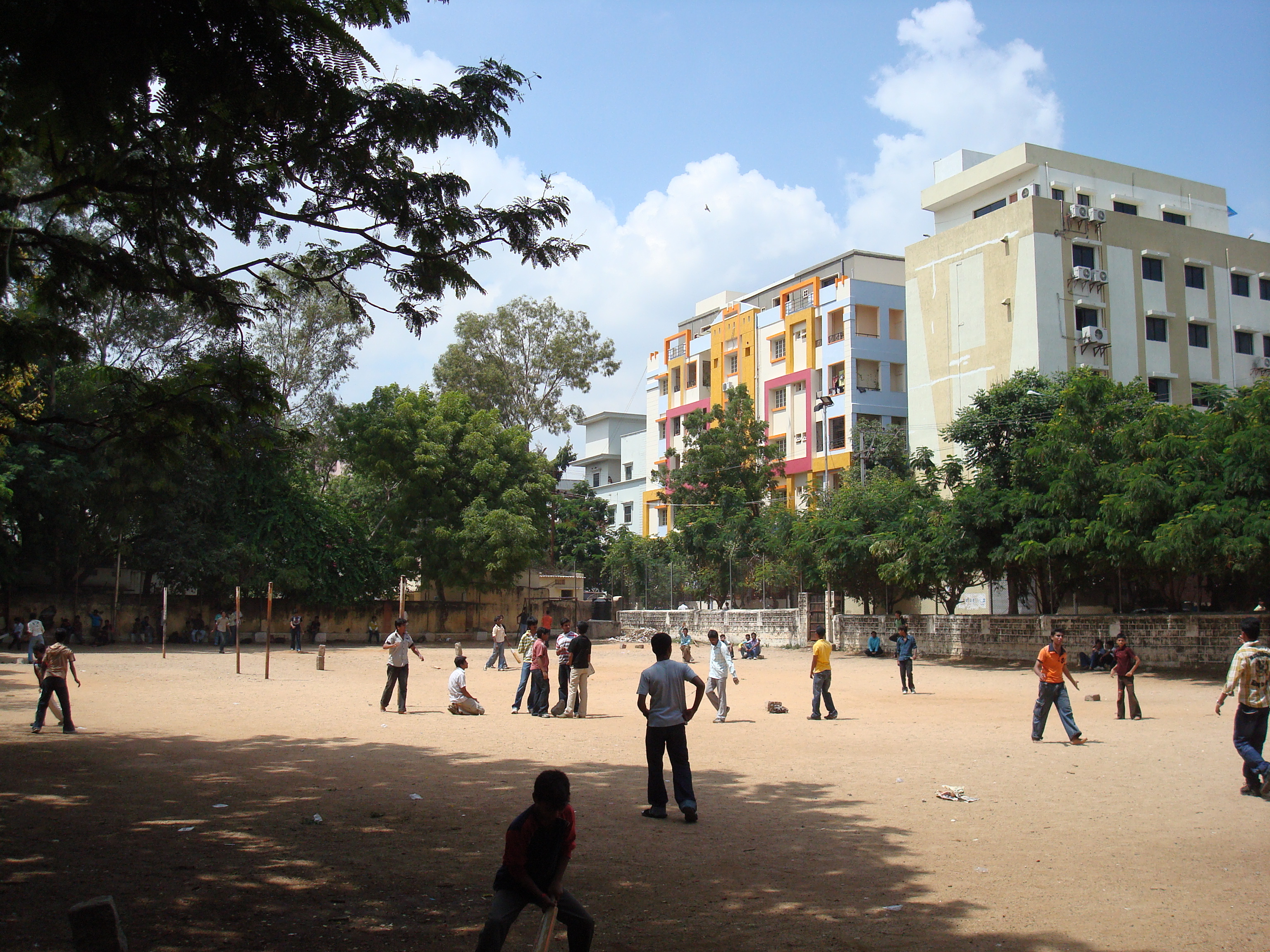
SR Nagar playground
