= Renuka Lake =

Lake in Himachal Pradesh, India

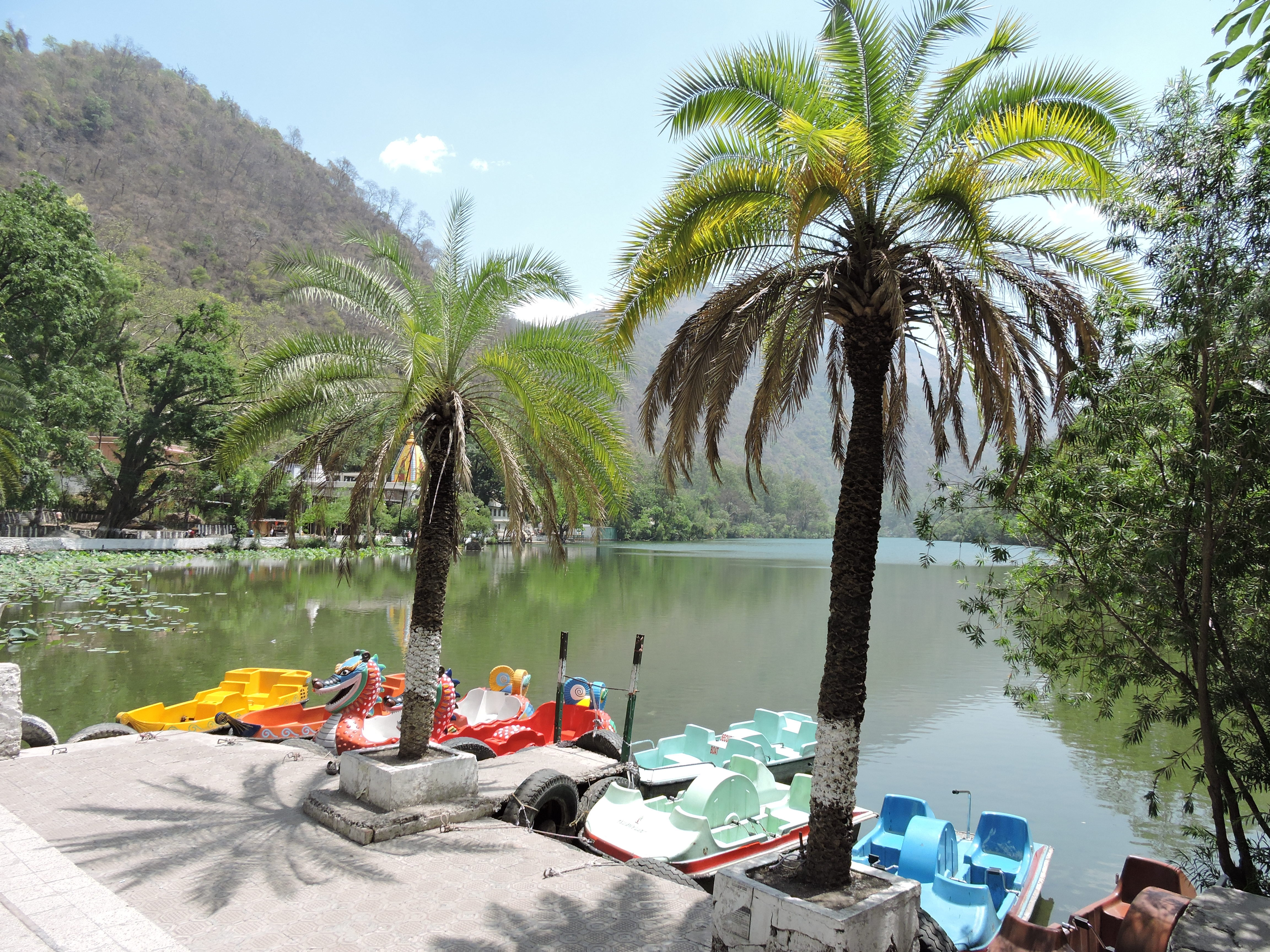
- Renuka Lake, Himachal Pradesh

- Location within Himachal Pradesh
- Location: Sirmaur district, Himachal Pradesh
- Coordinates: 30°36′36″N 77°27′30″E
- Lake type: Low altitude lake
- Basin countries: India
- Shore length^{1}: 3,214 m (10,545 ft)
- Surface elevation: 672 m (2,205 ft)
- References: hptdc.gov.in

Ramsar Wetland
- Official name: Renuka Wetland
- Designated: 8 November 2005
- Reference no.: 1571
- ^{1} Shore length is not a well-defined measure.

Renuka lake is in the Sirmaur district of Himachal Pradesh in India and it is 672 m above sea level. It is the largest lake in Himachal Pradesh, with a circumference of about 3,214 m. This lake was named after the goddess Renuka and has been a designated Ramsar site since November 2005.

== Location ==
- Distance from Parwanoo: 123 km
- Distance from Paonta Sahib: via Sataun 51 km
- Distance from Nahan: 38 km

== Legend ==
On the eve of Prabodhini Ekadashi, a five-day Renuka fair begins with the religious observance of the arrival of Renuka's son, Parashurama, to the Renuka lake in Himachal, believed to be the goddess' abode. Devotees from all over the country arrive to observe the meeting of the mother and son.

According to the Puranas, the Renuka Tirtha is considered the birthplace of Parashurama, the sixth incarnation of Vishnu. Maharishi Jamadagni and his wife Renuka are regarded to have meditated for a long time at a hillock known as Tape Ka Tiba near the Renuka lake. With the blessings of Shiva, Vishnu is believed to have been born as their son.

According to local tradition, after the death of Jamadagni after he refused to part with the divine cow, Kamadhenu, Renuka is regarded to have jumped into the lake to take her own life.

The lake is said to have assumed the form of a woman, after which it was called the Renuka lake. When Parashurama arrived at the lake to pray to his mother to return, Renuka is believed to have told him that while she had assumed the lake as her residence, she would make her presence known during the occasion of Prabodhini Ekadashi, when she would meet him and bless her adherents.

One day advance, on dashami, the palanquin of Parashurama is brought to Renuka from the ancient temple in Jamu Koti village in a traditional procession known a ‘Shobha Yatra’, attended by lakhs of devotees.

== Sanctuary ==
The sanctuary is situated in Sirmour district in Himachal Pradesh. The sanctuary is well connected to the network of motorable roads. The total area of the sanctuary is about 4.028 km^{2}. The entire sanctuary consists of the Renuka Reserve Forest and has been declared as Abhayaranya. An area of roughly about 3 km^{2} that lies outside the sanctuary has been declared as a buffer belt.

The sanctuary falls in the biogeographical zone IV and biogeographical province IV as per the classification done by the Wildlife Institute of India (WII). According to forest types classification, the area falls under group 5B/C2, i.e., dry mixed deciduous forest and group 5/051, i.e., dry sal forest.

== Threats ==
The lake is threatened by its continuously shrinking size. The silt which is being deposited in the lake has caused concern among locals and the administration. The main cause of this is the soil being deposited on the banks, with the rain water and landslides in the nearby mountains. Construction material waste has been dumped into the lake for years, which is a big threat to the environment. The administration and Renuka Vikas Smiti have undertaken efforts to protect the lake. Plastic bags are banned in the entire region.

== Gallery ==
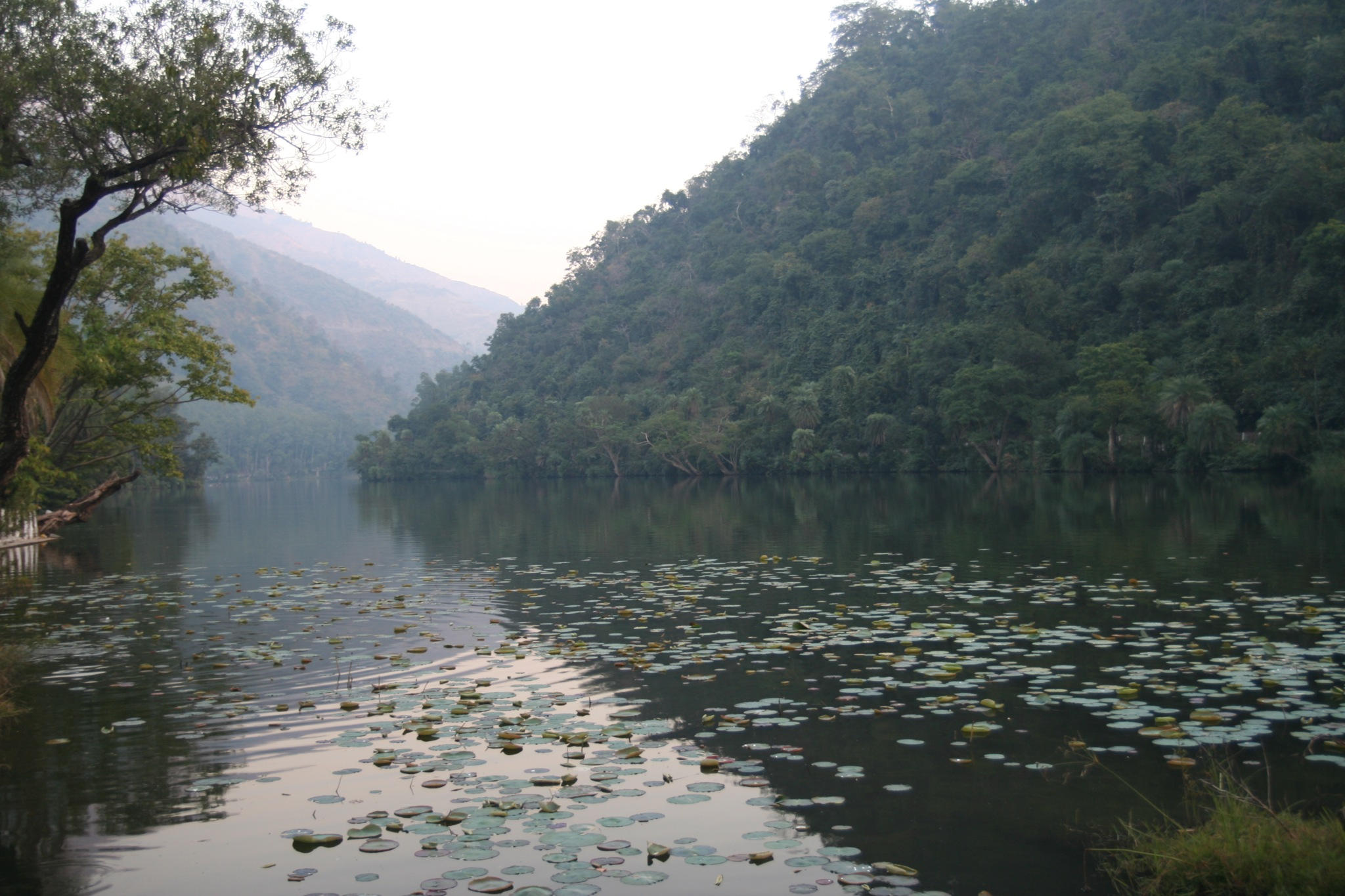
Lotus flowers in Renuka Lake, Himachal Pradesh

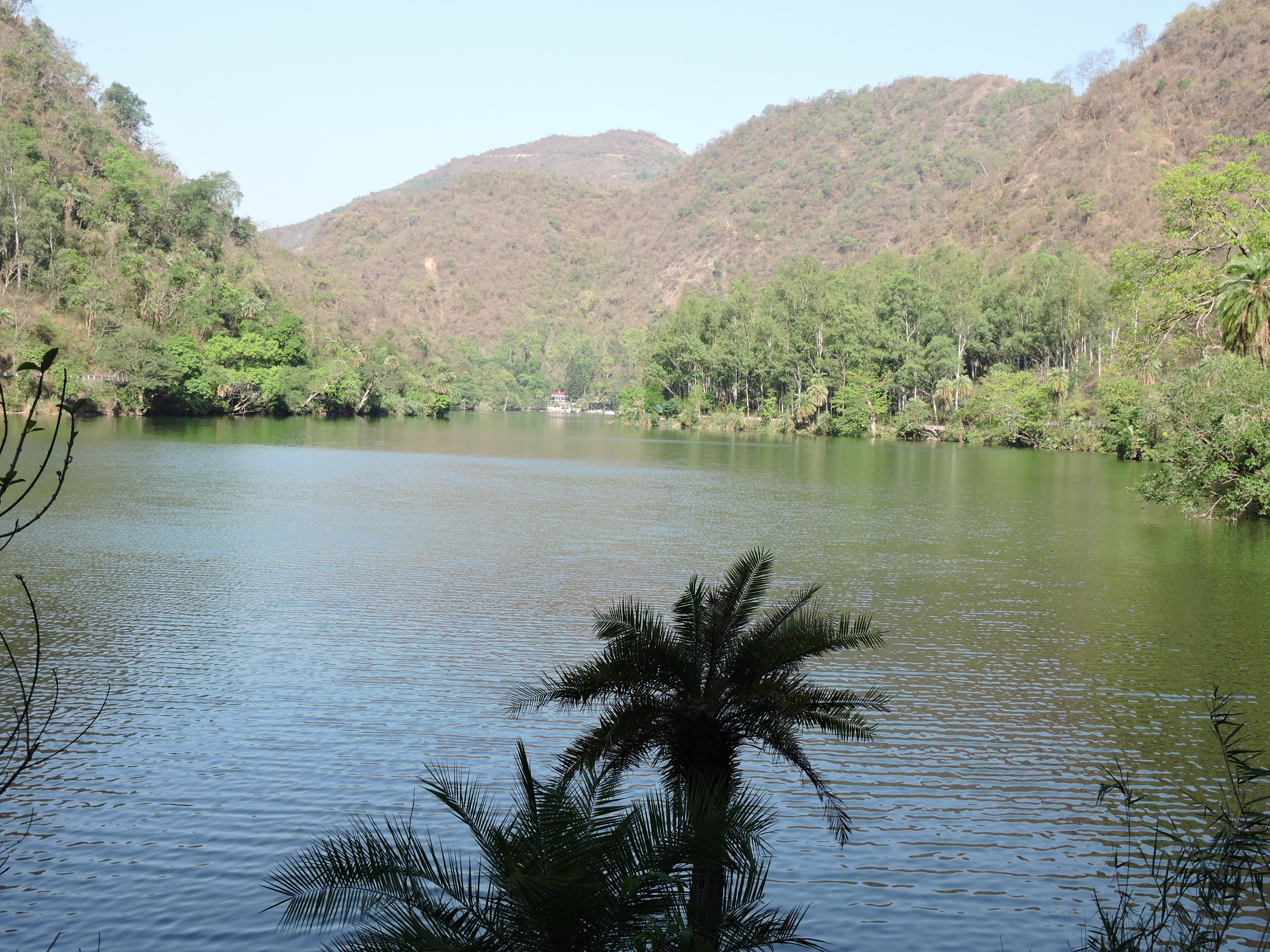
Renuka Lake, Himachal Pradesh

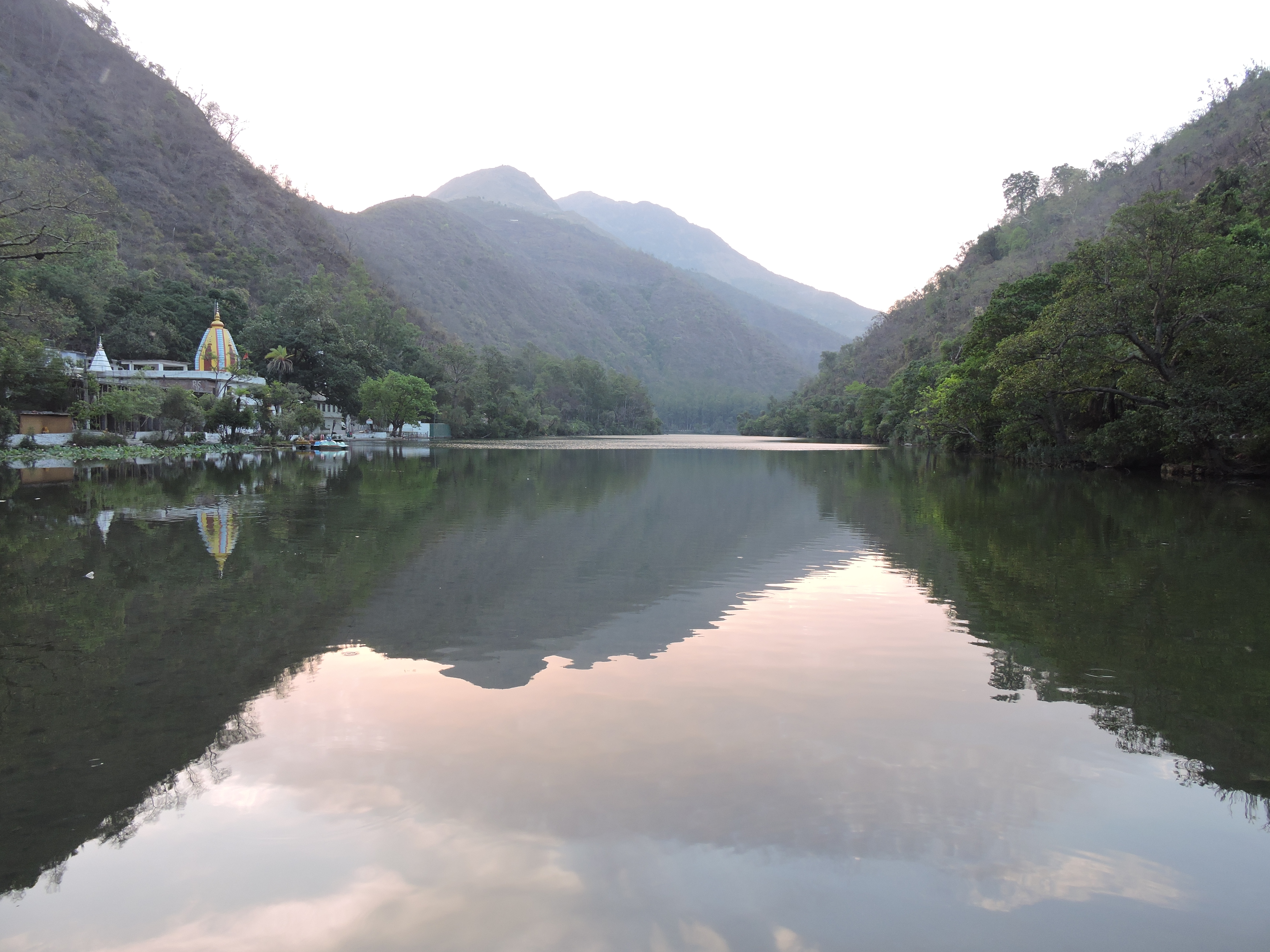
Renuka lake, district Sirmaur Himachal Pradesh

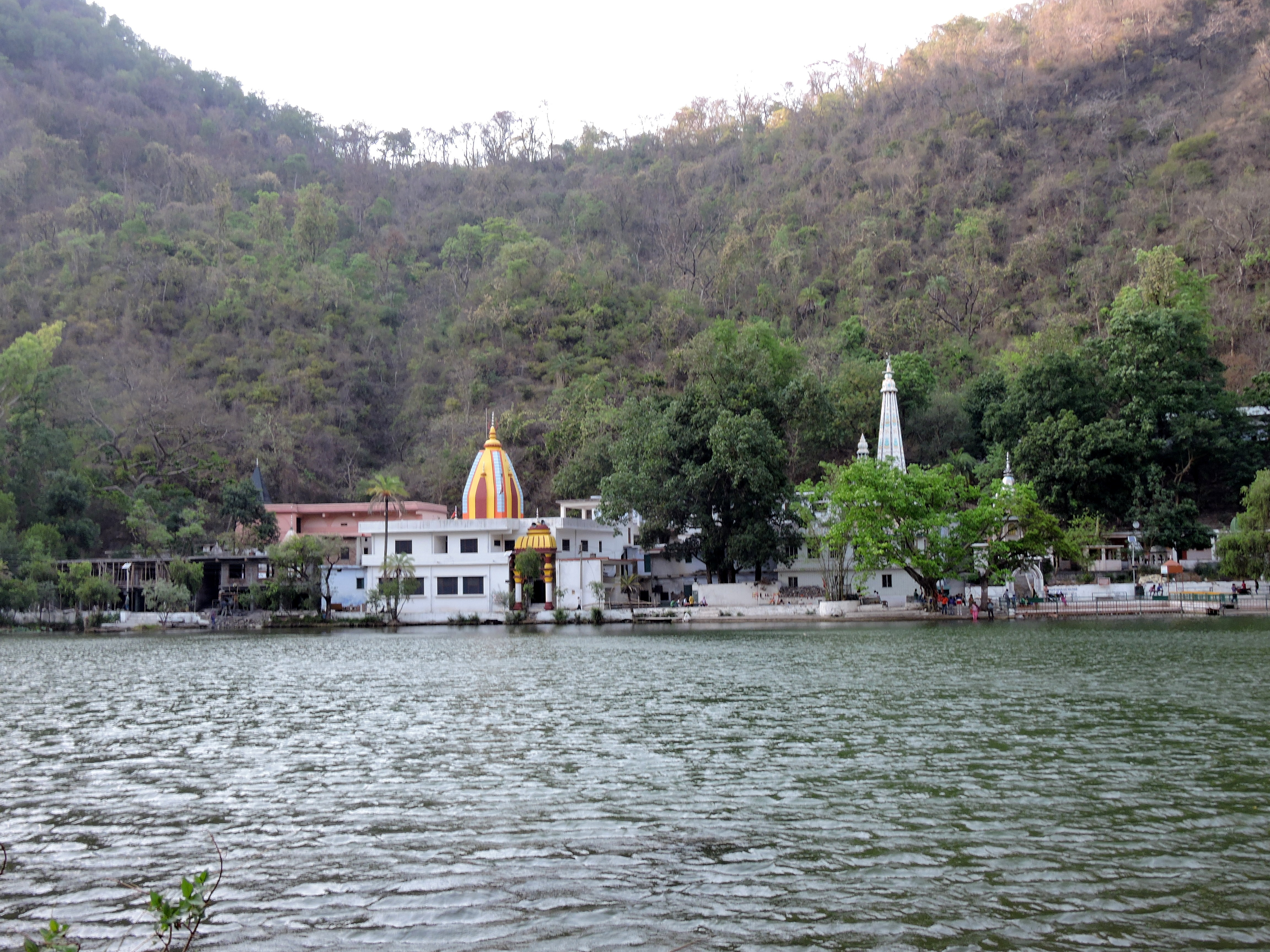
Renuka Ji temple, Himachal Pradesh

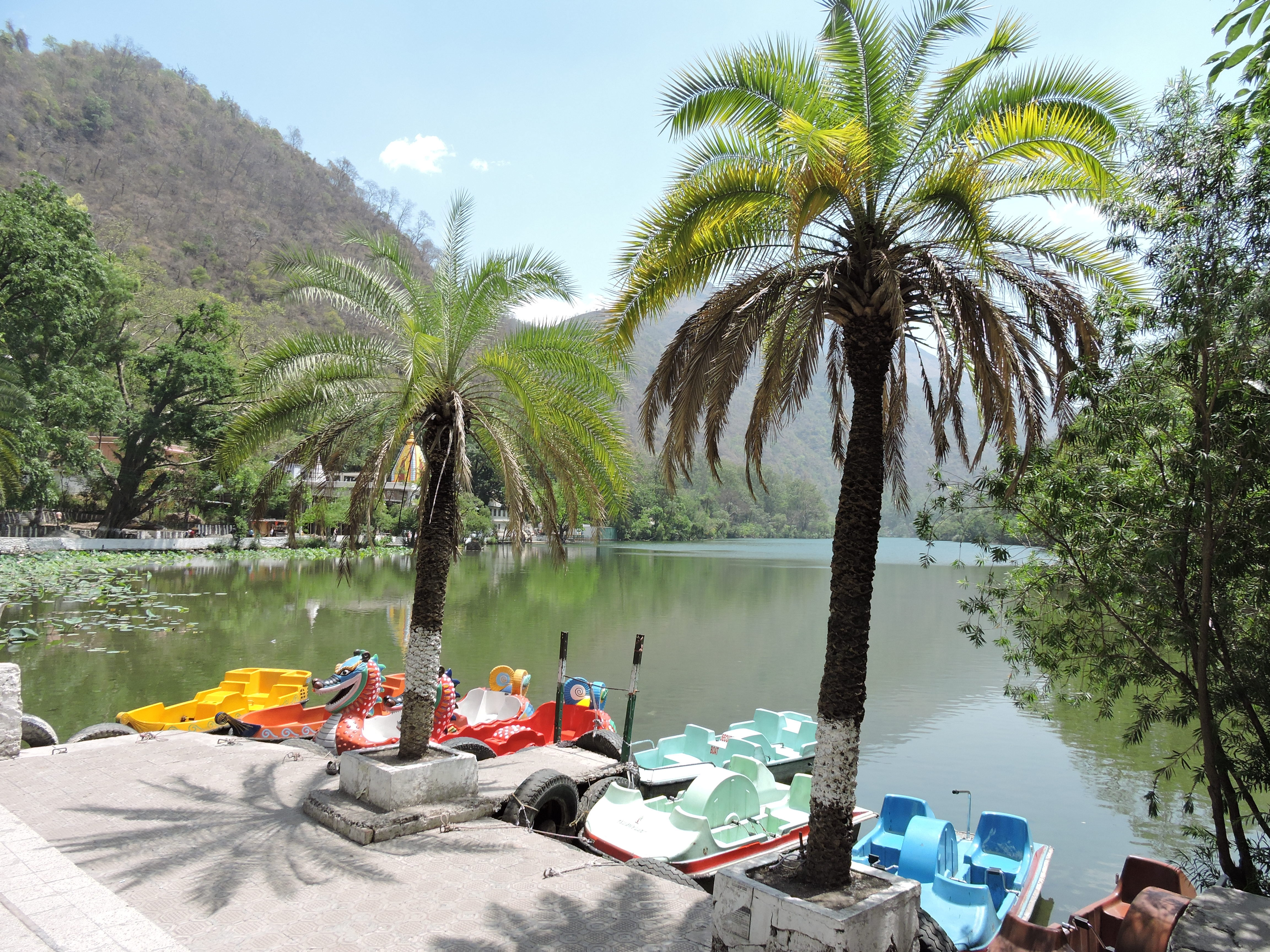
Renuka Lake, district Sirmaur, Himachal Pradesh

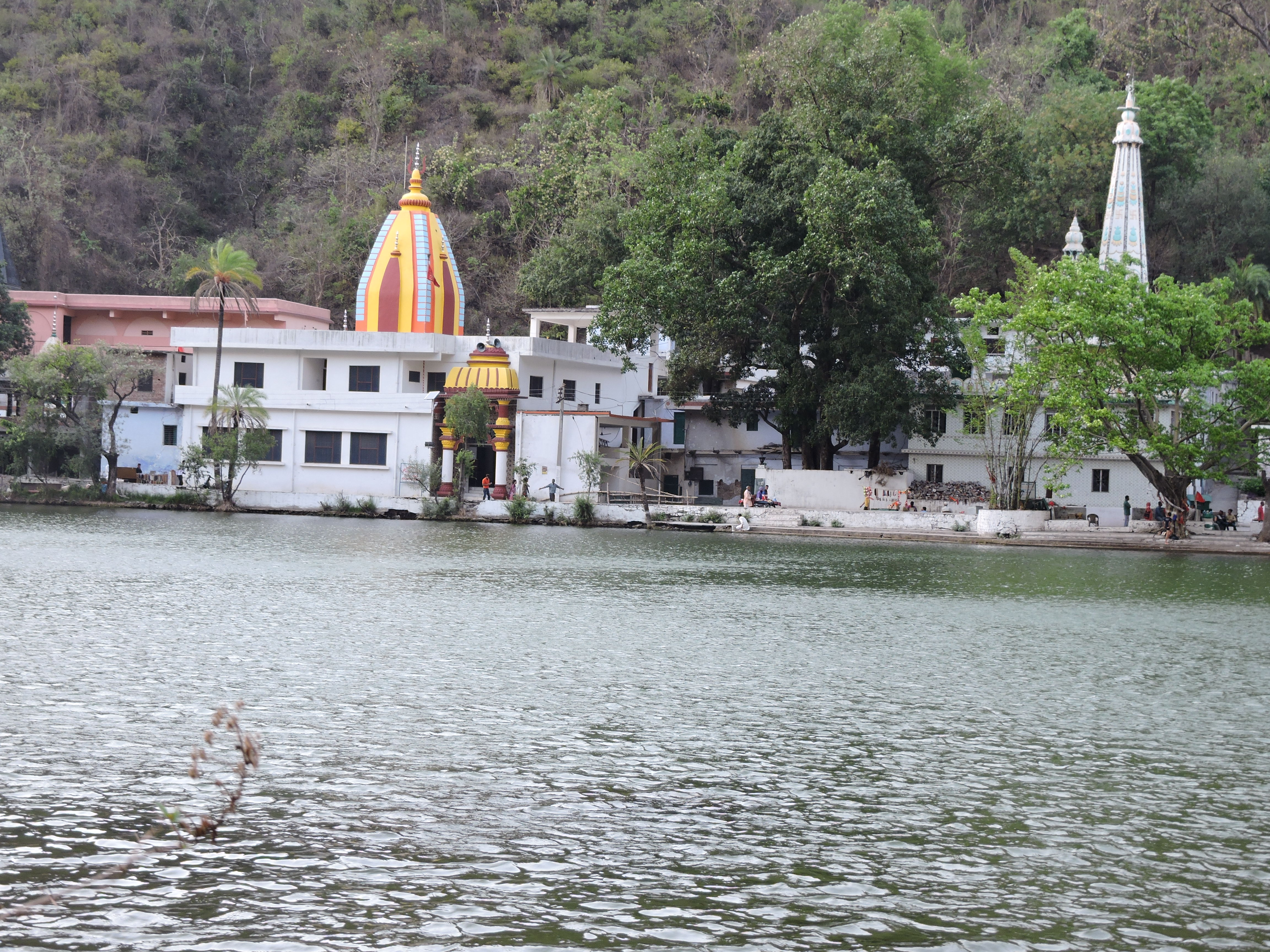
Renuka Temple, district Sirmaur Himachal Pradesh

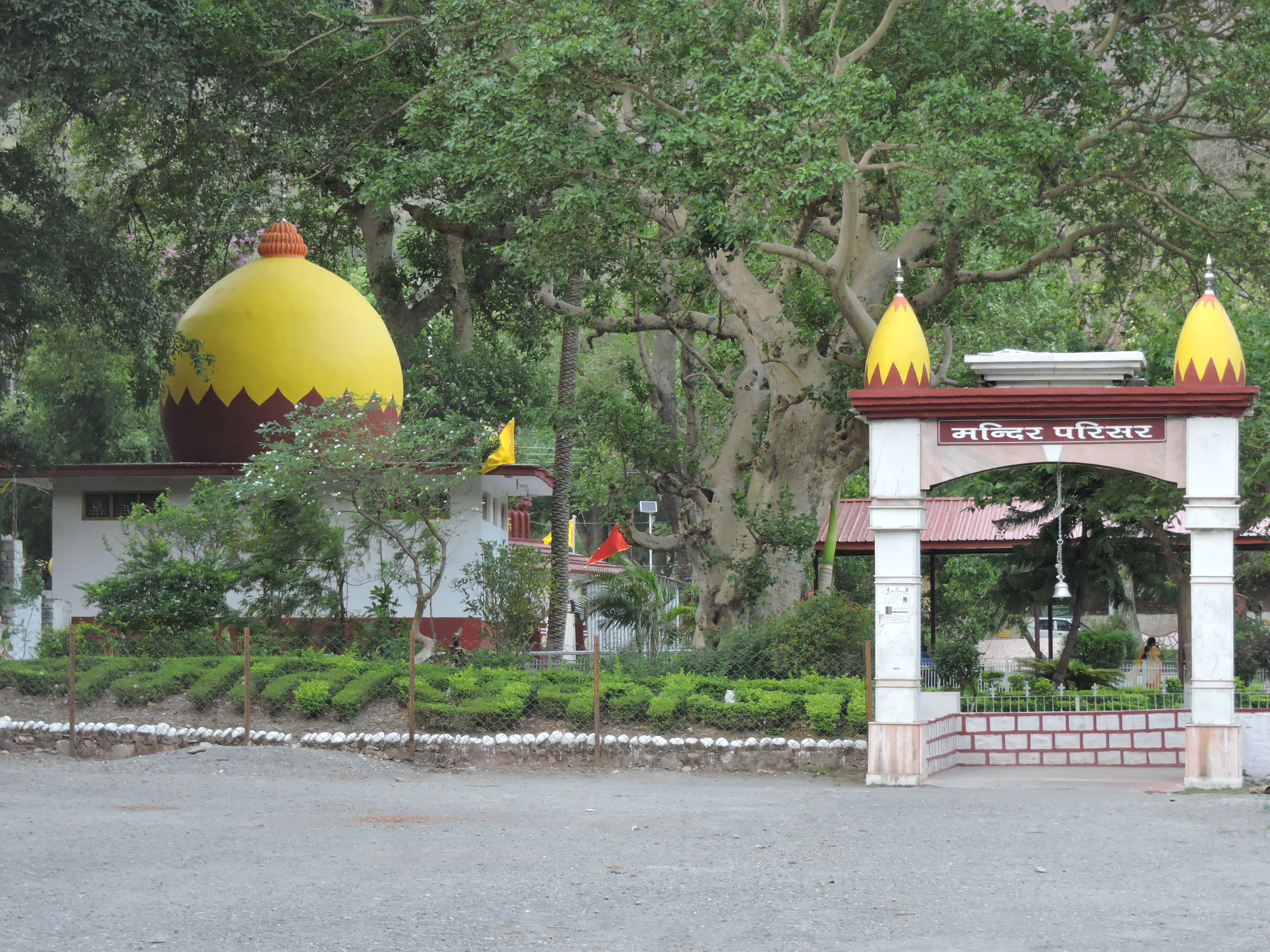
Renuka Temple Himachal Pradesh

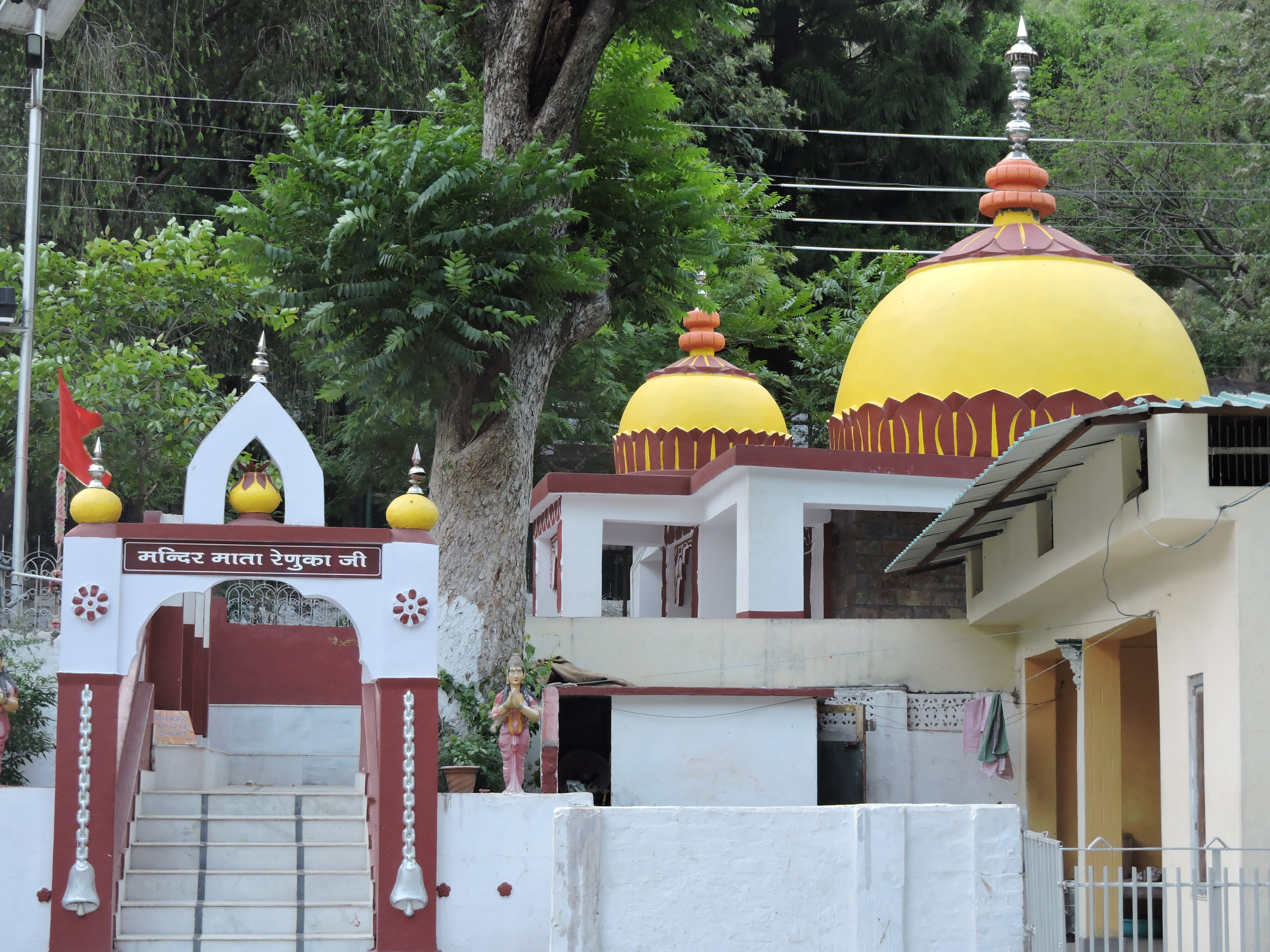
Renuka Temple, Renuka Lake, Himachal Pradesh

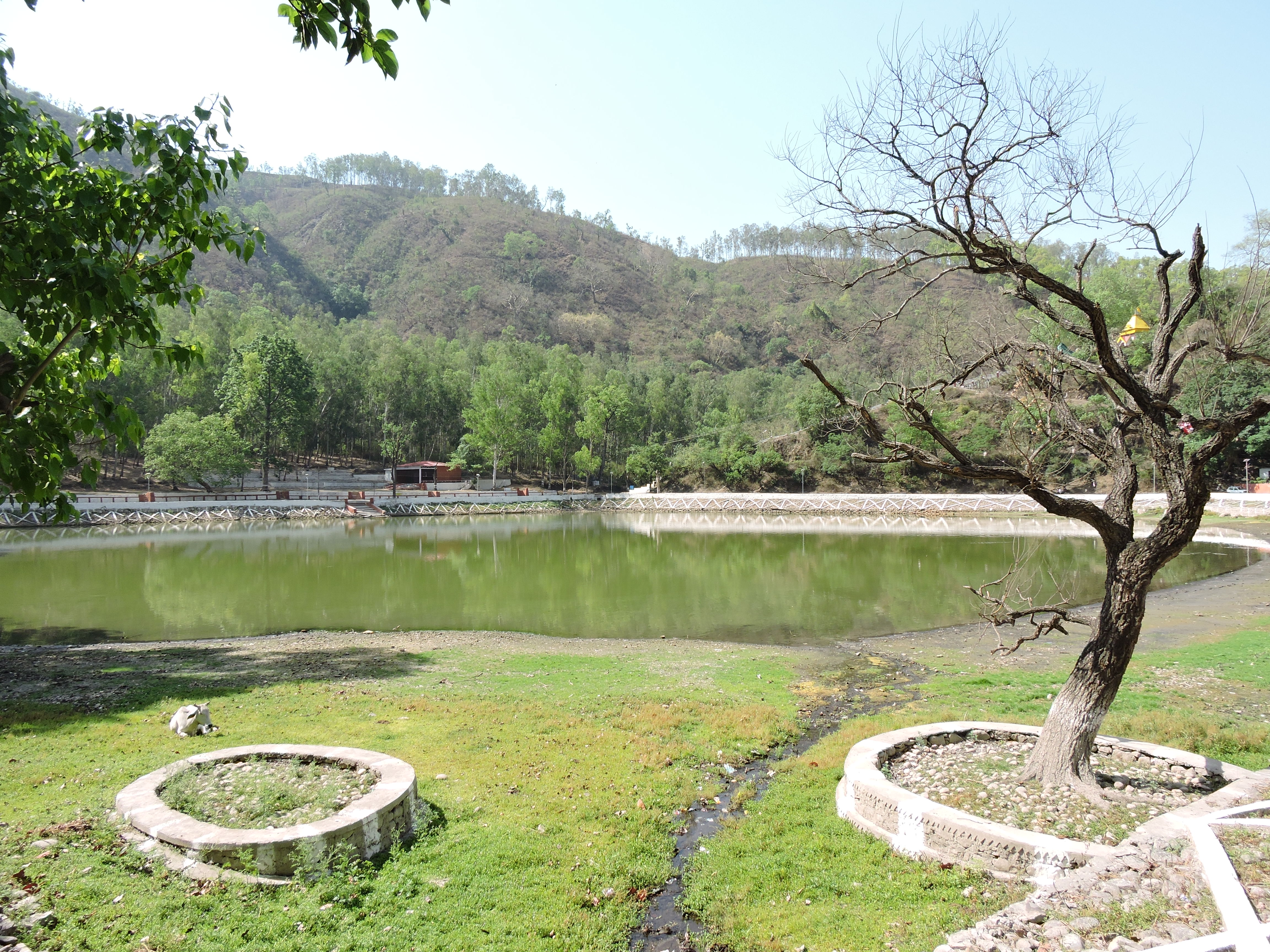
Pershuram Sarovar, Renuka lake

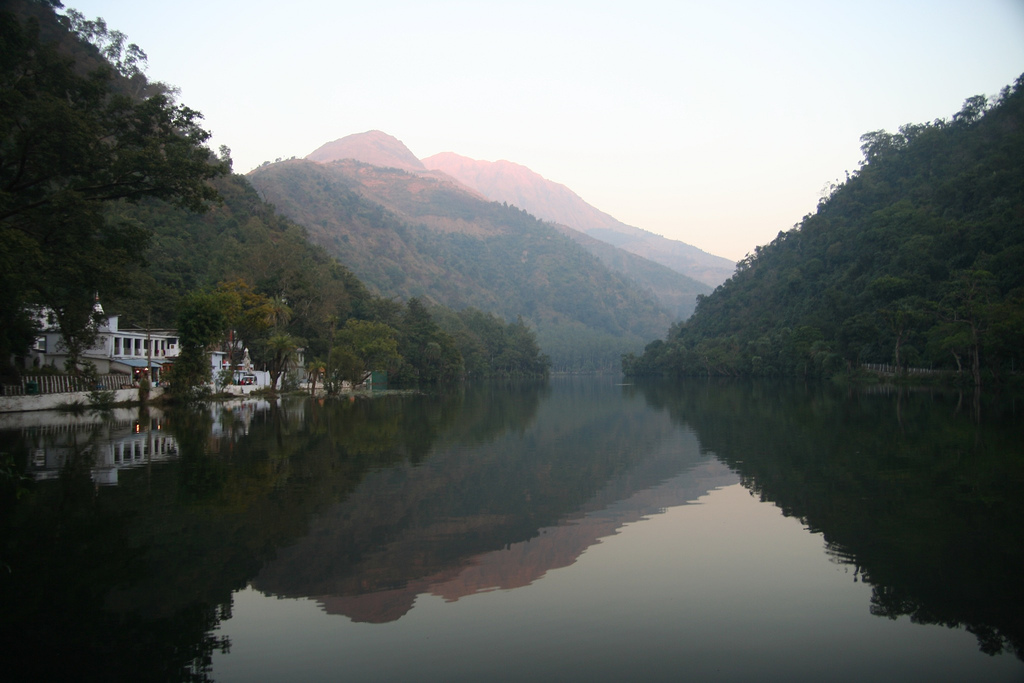
Renuka lake, district Sirmaur Himachal Pradesh

== See also ==
- Bhakra Dam
- Kishau Dam
- Lakhwar Dam
