= Balkampet =

- neighbourhood
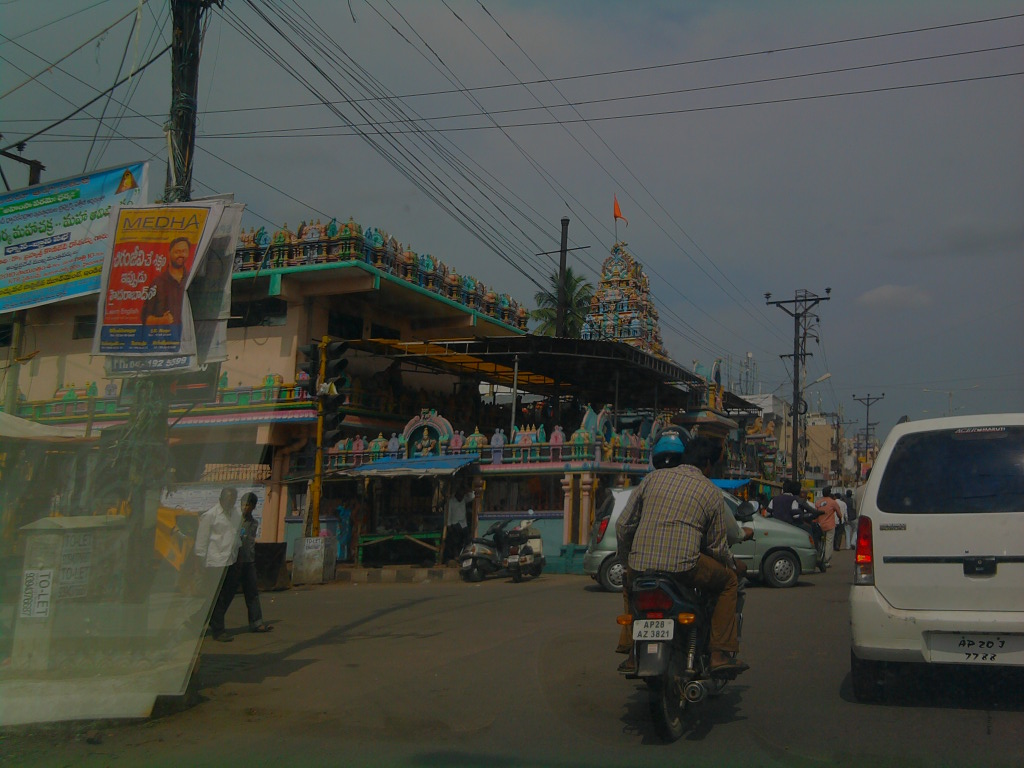
- Balkampet Yellamma temple

- Location in Telangana, India Balkampet (Telangana) Balkampet (India)
- Coordinates: 17°26′42″N 78°26′56″E
- Country: India
- State: Telangana
- District: Hyderabad
- Metro: Hyderabad

Government
  - Body: GHMC

Languages
  - Official: Telugu
- Time zone: UTC+5:30 (IST)
- PIN: 500 018
- Vehicle registration: TG
- Lok Sabha constituency: Secunderabad
- Vidhan Sabha constituency: Sanathnagar
- Planning agency: GHMC
- Website: telangana.gov.in

Balkampet is a developing suburb in Hyderabad, India. It is located close to other bigger suburbs such as Ameerpet, Sanjeeva Reddy Nagar, Sanathnagar and Fatehnagar. This suburb is known for its hardware business. This suburb is also a religious attraction since a famous Yellamma temple is located here. It attracts many devotees from the entire the city, mainly on Sundays, Tuesdays and also during the festival of Bonalu. Jaya Prakash Nagar and other small areas are part of Balkampet.

== Economy ==
Balkampet's economy lies mainly in the hardware sector. Many dealers are involved in cement, paints, electriconics, timber and hardware businesses. The popular Nature Cure Hospital is located in this suburb, which is well known for natural cure of various illnesses. Yellamma temple is frequently thronged by visitors. A couple of new restaurants/hotels have opened here recently. Other local shops selling groceries and other items can be found all over the suburb.

== Transport ==
The buses run by TSRTC connect Balkampet with all parts of the city. Balkampet main road links other suburbs such as Ameerpet, Sanjeeva Reddy Nagar, Sanathnagar and Fatehnagar. The closest MMTS Train station is at Nature Cure hospital. From Secunderabad Bus stop 10P Number bus will take you to Balkampet, Yellamma Temple. Also 45K is also one of the bus which connects Balkampet to Secundrabad.

== Schools ==
There are many schools and colleges located close to this suburb at Sanjeeva Reddy Nagar.
