= Fateh Nagar railway station =

Railway station in Hyderabad, India

Fatehnagar
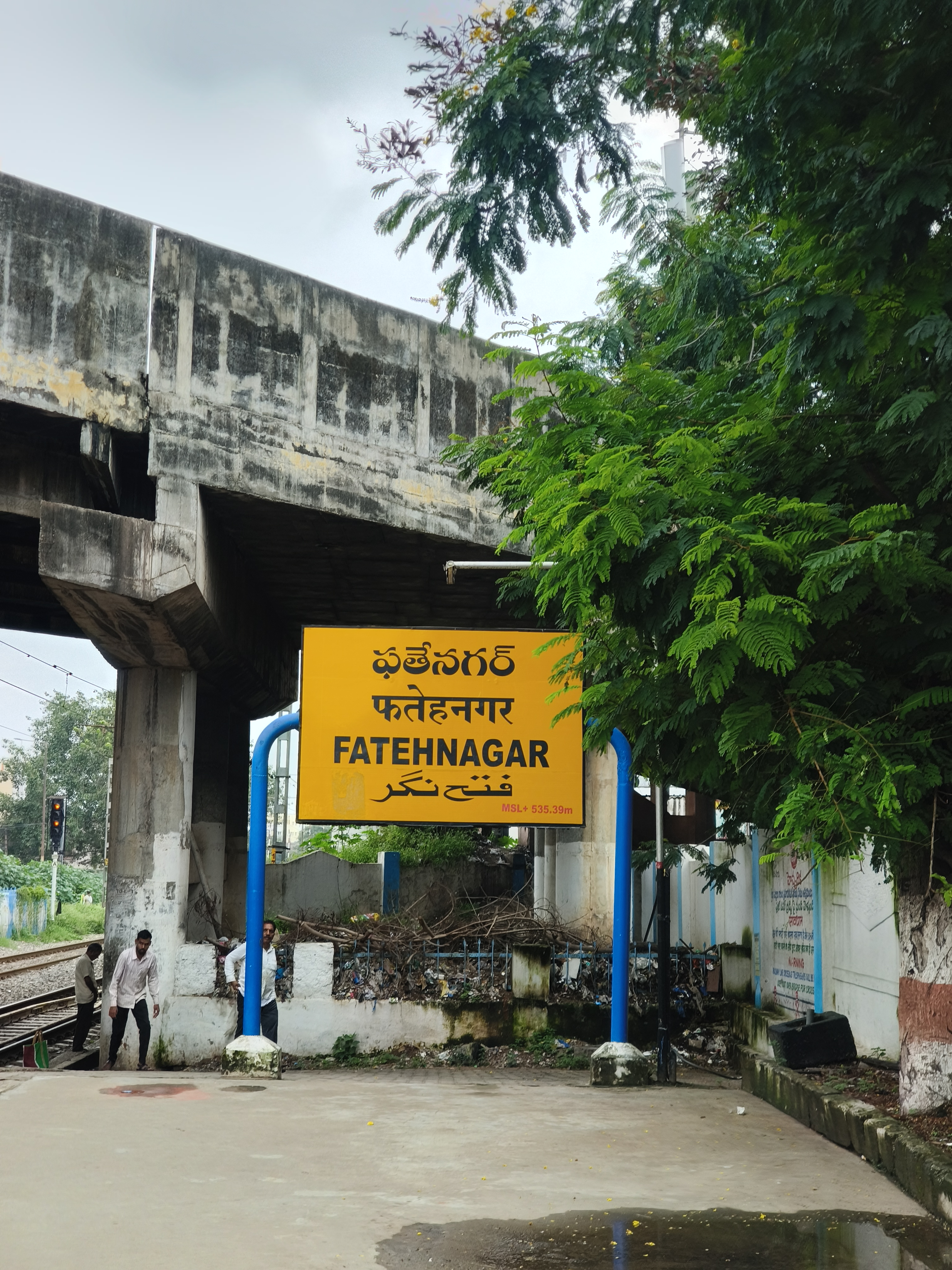
- Signboard of Fatehnagar railway station

General information
- Location: Hyderabad; India
- Coordinates: 17.360°N 78.492°E
- System: Indian Railways and Hyderabad MMTS station
- Owner: Indian Railways
- Operator: South Central Railway
- Lines: Hyderabad–Lingampalli line Falaknuma–Lingampalli line
- Platforms: 2

Other information
- Station code: FNB

History
- Former names: Fatehnagar Bridge
Location

Fatehnagar railway station is an Indian railway station in the Fateh Nagar area of Hyderabad. It serves mainly the MMTS trains.

== Lines ==
- Multi-Modal Transport System, Hyderabad
  - Secunderabad–Falaknuma route (SF Line)
