= Fateh Nagar, Hyderabad =

Neighbourhood in India

Fatehnagar is a neighborhood in Hyderabad, Telangana. There are many small-scale industries in the area. It is located next to Begumpet Airport. It was named after Nawab Abul Fatah Khan, the eldest son of Amir-e-Paigah Nawab Sultan-ul-Mulk Bahadur and grandson of the Vth Amir of Paigah, Nawab Sir Vicar-ul-Umara Bahadur.

== Transport ==
There is a local train station of MMTS, Fateh Nagar Railway Station.Bus stand is even available
