= Dhamnand village =

Village in Maharashtra

Coordinates: 17.6135°N 73.6079°E

Dhamnand is a beautiful village in Khed Taluka in the state of Maharashtra, India. It is located in Ratnagiri District beside the Vaki and Nagzari River. Its population is about 4500, with the main industries being farming and forestry. The village god, or Gramdevata, is Zolai Devi.

== Subdivisions ==
Dhamnand is further divided into many Wadis:

1. Mhapadiwadi- Maruti
2. Mulanda - the temple of Kalika Devi
3. Payarwadi - Dubleshvar Shiva Temple, Saibaba Temple and private temples as well
4. Tambad
5. Raw -Zolae Devi
6. Lingayat
7. Khadak
8. Rohidas
9. Kadam
10. Sutarwadi - Virat Vishvakarma Temple is in this zone
11. Rajwada-Kajufata
12. Jadhavwadi- Shri Ram Temple
13. Vaglacha Mal
14. Gudhyacha Aad- Shri Datta Temple, Vir Hanuman Temple
15. Ratamba Mal
16. Ganpati- Lord Ganesh Temple
17. Niwachi
18. Shindewadi - Lord Ganapati Temple
19. Boudhawadi - Thatagat Samaj Mandir
20. Brahminwadi – Vitthal Rakhumae Temple
