= Jamadagni =

Father of Parashurama in Hinduism

- Affiliation: Saptarishi
- Weapon: Sharanga
- Texts: Mahabharata, Puranas

Genealogy
- Parents: Richika (father), Satyavati (mother)
- Spouse: Renuka
- Children: Ṛumaṇvān, Suhotra, Vasu, Viśvāvasu, and Parashurama

Jamadagni (Sanskrit: जमदग्नि, lit. 'great fire') is a sage in Hindu literature. He is regarded in Hindu tradition to be one of the Saptarishi (Seven Vedic sages) in the 7th, and the current age of Manvantara.

He is a descendant of the sage Bhrigu, one of the Prajapatis created by Brahma, the creator deity. Jamadagni has five children with his wife, Renuka, the youngest of whom is Parashurama, an avatar of Vishnu.

== Legend ==
=== Birth ===
According to the Bhagavata Purana, the sage Richika was asked by King Gadhi to bring a thousand white horses with black ears to marry Satyavati. Richika, with the help of Varuna, brought those horses and the king allowed Richika to marry Satyavati.

After their wedding, Satyavati, and her mother, demanded from Richika the blessings for having a son. Accordingly, the sage prepared two portions of milk boiled rice for each, one with the Brahma mantra (for Satyavati) and other with the Kṣātra mantra (for his mother-in-law). Giving the respective portions, he went to perform his ablutions. Meanwhile, Satyavati's mother asked her daughter to swap their portions. Her daughter obeyed. When Richika learned of this exchange, he said that the child born of his mother-in-law would be a great Brahmana, but that his son would become an aggressive warrior, who would bring a bloodbath to this world. Satyavati prayed to amend this outcome, so that her son would be born as the great Brahmana, but that her grandson would become the aggressive warrior. This resulted in Jamadagni being born as a sage (out of Satyavati's womb) and eventually, Parashurama being born as Jamadagni's son, a warrior with a fearful reputation.

Thus, Jamadagni was born to Richika and Satyavati. Meanwhile, around the same time as Jamadagni's birth, Gadhi's wife Paurakuthsu (Satyavati's mother) gave birth to a son with Kshatriya traits, named Kaushika. He later becomes the renowned Vishvamitra, who was a Kshatriya by birth, but later ascended to the status of a Brahmarishi.

=== Householder ===
Growing up, Jamadagni studied hard and achieved erudition in his studies of the Vedas. He is said to have acquired knowledge regarding the science of weapons without any formal instruction, with the guidance of his father. The Aushanasa Dhanurveda, now lost, is about a conversation between Jamadagni and Ushanas on the exercises of warfare.

After achieving the status of a rishi, Jamadagni visited a number of holy sites, and finally reached the palace of King Prasenajit of the Solar dynasty. He fell in love with his daughter, Princess Renuka, upon seeing her, and asked the king for her hand in marriage. Subsequently, the two were married, and had five sons: Ṛumaṇvān, Suhotra, Vasu, Viśvāvasu, and Rama, later known as Parshurama. The couple started to engage in tapasya along the banks of the river Narmada.

He receives Sharanga, the celestial bow of Vishnu, from his father, Richika.

=== Death of Renuka ===
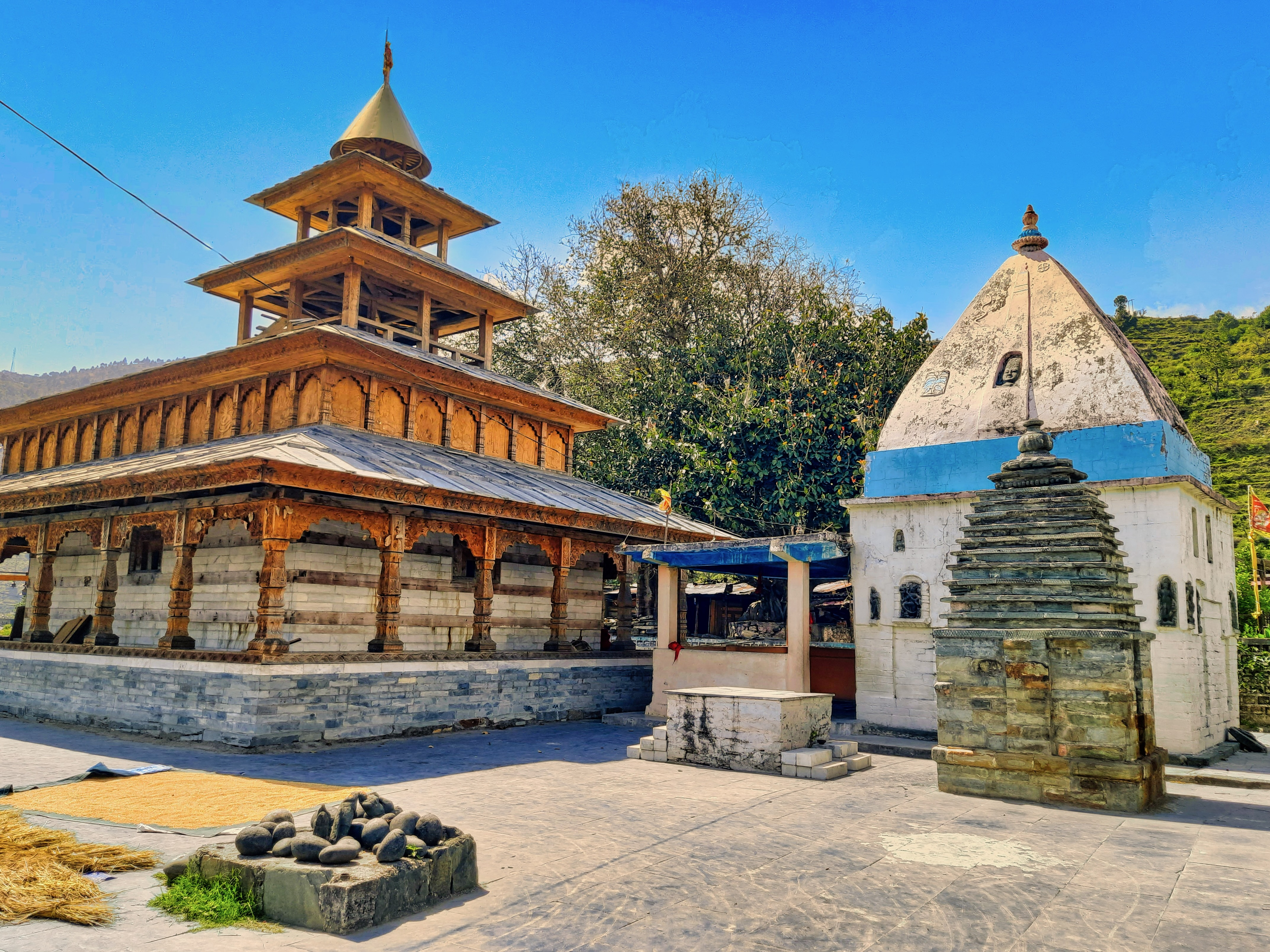
Jamadagni group of temples, on the bank of the Yamuna river in Thaan, Uttarkashi district.

According to the Brahmanda Purana, Renuka once went to the banks of the river Narmada to fetch some water. There, she observed the king of the Salva kingdom playing with his queen in the water. She stood there, mesmerised by the beauty of the sight. By the time she reached the hermitage of her husband with the water, she was quite late. The weary Jamadagni was furious when he heard the reason for her delay, and called forth each of his sons, one after the other, to kill her. Each of them refused to kill their own mother. Parashurama, however, came forth, and beheaded his mother with a single arrow. The rishi exiled his four older sons to the forests due to their disobedience. Pleased by Parashurama's devotion to him, he granted his son any boon of his choice. Parashurama wished for his mother to be restored to life, and this was granted.

=== Dharma's test ===
In the Ashvamedha Parva of the Mahabharata, Dharma took the form of Anger, and manifested at the ashrama of Jamadagni. He observed that the rishi had just milked his cow, Kamadhenu, and kept her milk in a pot. As Anger, Dharma crept into the pot. Despite drinking it, Jamadagni remained calm. Noticing this, Dharma appeared as a Brahmin before the rishi, and blessed him with the boon that he would always be righteous in the future.

=== Boons from Surya ===
According to the Mahabharata, Jamadagni once became annoyed with the sun god, Surya, for causing too much heat. The warrior-sage shot several arrows into the sky, terrifying Surya. Surya then appeared before the rishi as a Brahmin, and gave him two inventions that would help mankind deal with his heat - sandals and an umbrella.

=== Death ===
Jamadagni was once visited by the Haihaya king Kartavirya Arjuna and his retinue (who was said to have thousand arms/hands), to whom he served a feast offered by the divine cow, Kamadhenu. The king sent his minister called Chandragupta, who offered a ten million cows, or even half the kingdom, to purchase this cow of plenty, but Jamadagni refused to part with her. Not willing to concede, Chandragupta and his men seized the cow by force and took her away with them. The helpless rishi, who loved the cow, pursued Chandragupta's party as they traversed the forest, unwilling to allow them to steal her. Infuriated by his defiance, the minister struck down Jamadagni, and took Kamadhenu to the king's capital city of Māhiṣmatī.

After a long wait, Renuka started to search for her husband, finding him almost dead, surrounded by a pool of his own blood. Renuka fainted at the sight, and when she returned to consciousness, started wailing. When Parashurama and his disciple, Akṛtavraṇa, found her, she turned to him, and beat her breast twenty-one times. Parashurama resolved that he would travel the world twenty-one times, and annihilate all the Kshatriya kings he could find. When Jamadagni was to be cremated, the sage Shukra arrived on the scene, and restored the rishi's life with the Mṛtasañjīvanī mantra.

Parashurama and Akṛtavraṇa travelled to Māhiṣmatī, intending to bring Kamadhenu back home. At the gates of the city, they met Kartavirya Arjuna and his forces in battle, and slew them. They returned the divine cow to Jamadagni. The rishi instructed his son to perform a penance at Mahendragiri in order to cleanse himself of his sins. While Parashurama had left for this penance, Shurasena, a son of Kartavirya Arjuna, and his men, exacted their vengeance by beheading Jamadagni at his hermitage, and taking his head with them so that he could not be resurrected again. Parashurama and Jamadagni's disciples cremated the rishi, and his wife Renuka performed sati. Thence, Parashurama, inheriting his fallen father's Sharanga, started his twenty-one expeditions to obliterate the kings of the Kshatriya race.

== Buddhism ==
In the Buddhist Vinaya Pitaka section of the Mahavagga (I.245) the Buddha pays respect to Yamadaggi (Pali form of "Jamadagni") by declaring that the Vedas (Shruti's) in their true form were revealed to the original Vedic rishis, including Jamadagni.
