= Bhagyanagar Express =

Train in India

Overview
- Service type: Express
- Locale: Telangana & Maharashtra
- First service: 1 November 1970; 55 years ago
- Current operator: South Coast Railways

Route
- Termini: Secunderabad Junction (SC); Sirpur Kagaznagar (SKZR)
- Stops: 32
- Distance travelled: 367 km (228 mi)
- Average journey time: 9 hours 35 minutes
- Service frequency: Daily
- Train number: 17233 / 17234

On-board services
- Classes: 1 AC chair car, 1 second class sitting, 14 general,
- Seating arrangements: Yes
- Sleeping arrangements: No
- Auto-rack arrangements: No
- Catering facilities: Yes
- Observation facilities: Large windows

Technical
- Rolling stock: LHB coach
- Track gauge: 1,676 mm (5 ft 6 in)
- Operating speed: 38 km/h (24 mph)
Route map
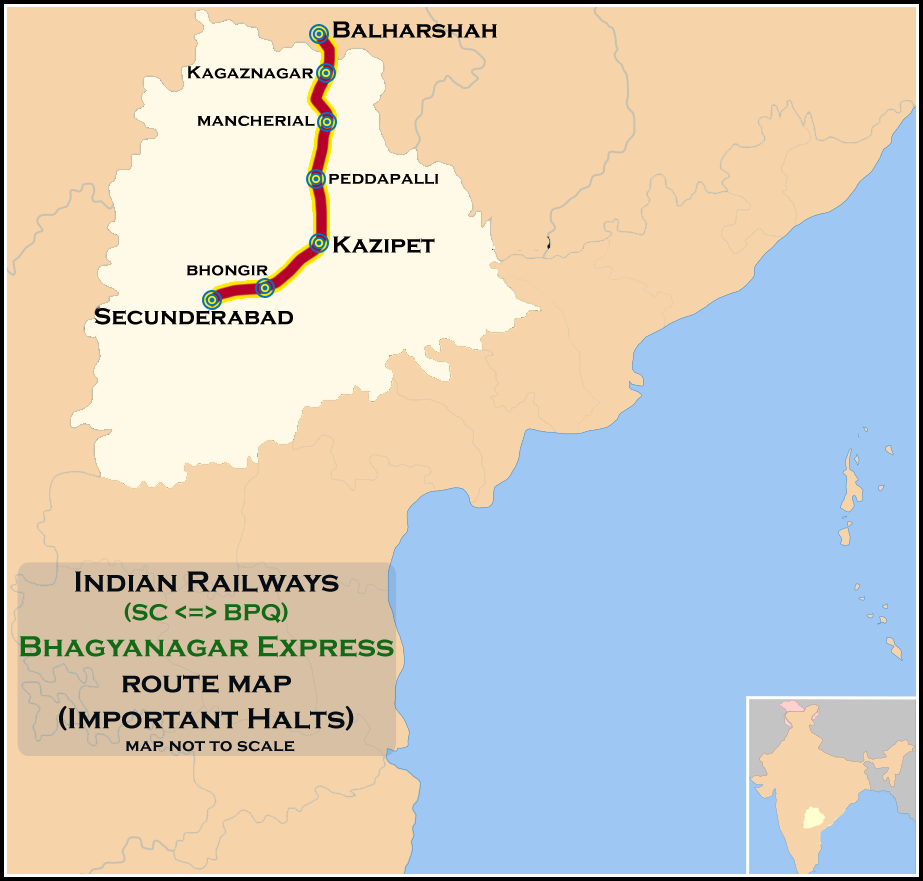

The 17233 / 17234 Bhagyanagar Express is the oldest Express train in India. It runs between Secunderabad Junction in Telangana and Balharshah Junction in Maharashtra. Due to the impact of COVID-19, the route terminates at Sirpur Kaghaznagar railway station. It was introduced on November 1, 1970. The Vijayawada railway division in the South Coast Railway zone of Indian Railways administers the train.

== Numbering ==
Train number 17233 runs from Secunderabad Junction to Sirpur Kaghaznagar railway station, while 17234 runs from Sirpur Kaghaznagar railway station to Secunderabad Junction.

== Routeing ==
The train runs from Secunderabad via Bibinagar, Bhongir, Jangaon, Kazipet Junction, Hasanparthi Road, Uppal, Peddapalli Junction, Ramagundam, Mancherial, and Bellampalli.

== Rake sharing ==
The train shares a rake with 17201/17202 Golconda Express.

== Traction ==
The train is hauled by a Lallaguda Loco Shed-based WAP-7 OR WAG-9 electric locomotive on its entire journey

== Classes ==
The 21 coach composition contains: 1 AC chair car, 3 second class sitting, 14 general, 2 SLR.

== See also ==
- Visakhapatnam Swarna Jayanti Express
- Padmavati Express
- Warangal
- Rudrama Devi
- Bahubali
