= DQR =

DQR can refer to:

- 𓂷, an Egyptian hieroglyph representing a fingernail; see List of Egyptian hieroglyphs
- Peach Springs Airport, an airport in Peach Springs, Arizona, US; see Boulder City Municipal Airport#Airlines and destinations
- Dabirpura railway station, a train station in Hyderabad, Telangana, India; see Secunderabad–Falaknuma route or Falaknuma–Lingampalli route
- German qualifications framework (German: Deutscher Qualifikationsrahmen), related to regulation of engineers in Germany; see Regulation and licensure in engineering#Techniker or Qualifications framework#National level
