= Narayanadri Express =

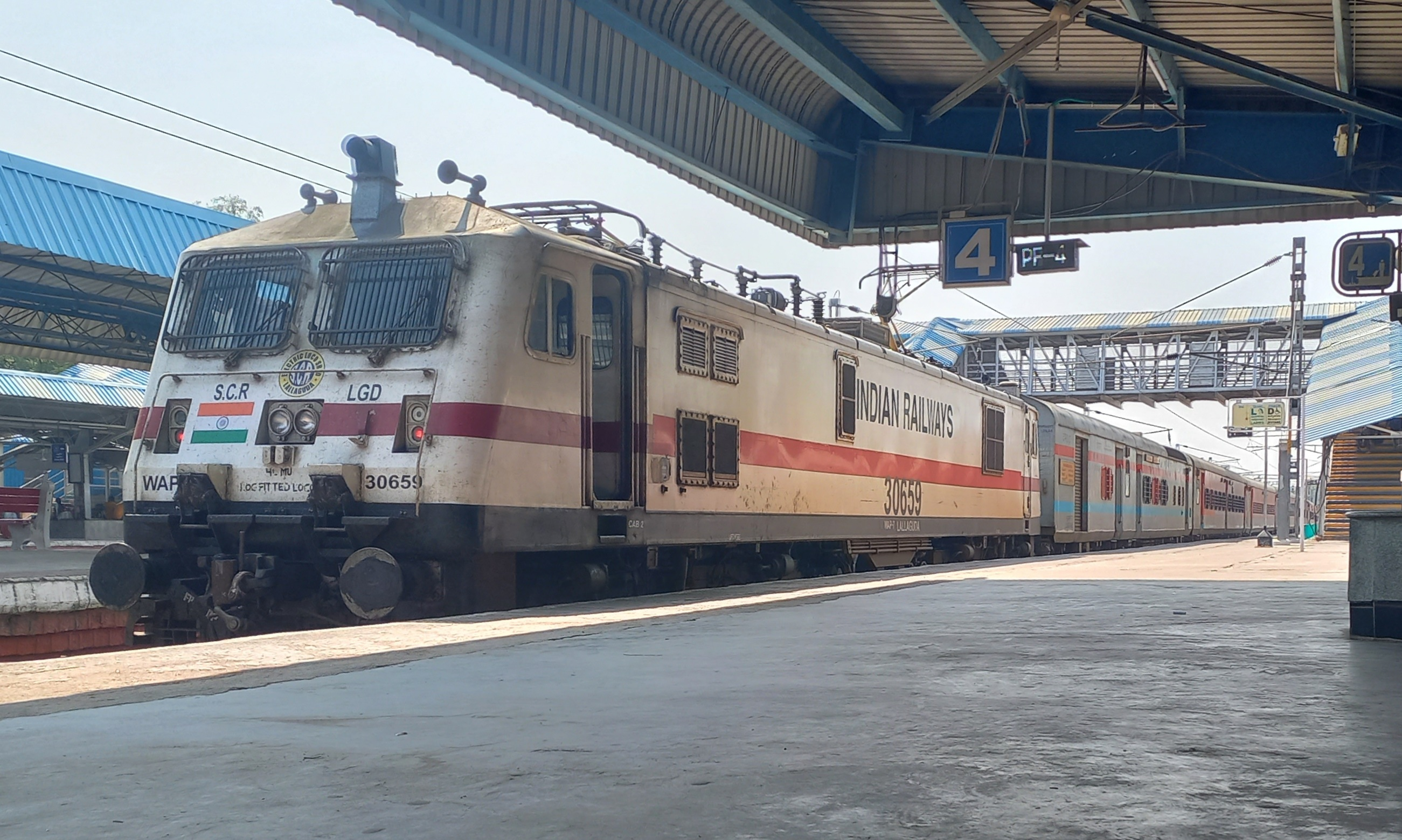
- Narayanadri Express

Overview
- Service type: Superfast Train
- Locale: Andhra Pradesh, Telangana
- First service: 1 July 1991
- Current operator: South Coast Railways

Route
- Termini: Lingampalli(LPI); Tirupati Main(TPTY)
- Stops: 23
- Distance travelled: 661 km (411 mi)
- Average journey time: 12 hours 45 minutes
- Service frequency: Daily
- Train number: 12734 / 12733

On-board services
- Classes: 3 AC, 2 AC, 1 AC, 3 AC (Economy), Sleeper, General
- Seating arrangements: Yes
- Sleeping arrangements: Yes
- Catering facilities: Yes
- Observation facilities: No rake sharing 2 dedicated rakes
- Entertainment facilities: Nil
- Baggage facilities: Under the Seats

Technical
- Rolling stock: 2
- Track gauge: 1,676 mm (5 ft 6 in) (Broad Gauge)
- Operating speed: 59 km/h (37 mph) (average with halts)
Route map
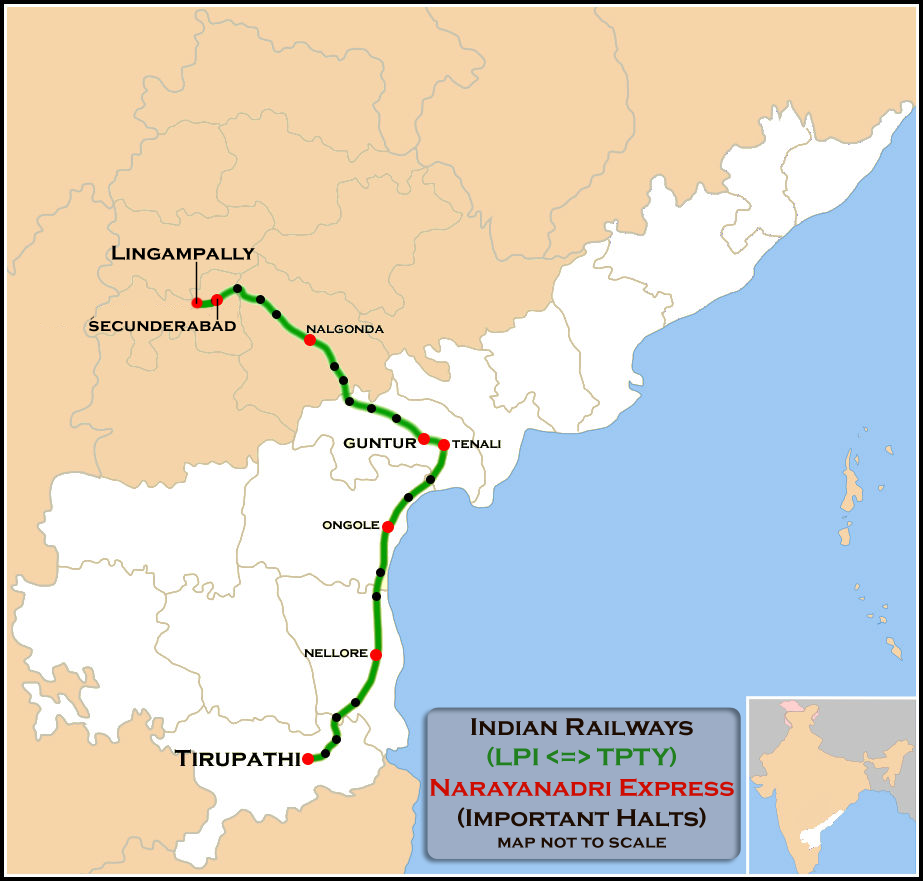

Narayanadri Express (numbered:12733/12734) is a superfast train belonging to Indian Railways, operated between Secunderabad and Tirupati. The train is extended up to Lingampalli from 5 September 2018.

== Etymology ==
The train is named after one of the seven hills of Tirupati.

== Inauguration date ==
This train was inaugurated by Chief Minister of Andhra Pradesh on Monday, 1 July 1991.

== Rake sharing ==
The train has no rake sharing with csmt Mumbai to secunderabad devagiri express and has two dedicated rakes with primary maintenance at Tirupati

== Halts ==
This train stops at Renigunta Jn, Srikalahasti, Venkatagiri, Gudur Jn, Nellore, Kavali, Singarayakonda, Ongole, Chirala, Bapatla, Tenali Jn, Guntur Jn, Sattenapalle, Piduguralla, Nadikude Jn, Vishnupuram, Miryalaguda, Nalgonda, Chityala, Ramannapet, Bibinagar, Secunderabad Jn, Begumpet.

== Coach composition ==
LHB coach

- 2 EOG
- 1 AC 1 Tier
- 3 AC 2 Tier
- 1 AC 3 Tier(Economy)
- 5 AC 3 Tier
- 6 Sleeper
- 2 General Unreserved

== Schedule ==
12733/34 runs Daily firm both the sides

| Train Number | Station Code | Departure Station | Departure Time (in Hrs) | Arrival Station | Arrival Time (in Hrs) | Departure Time (in Hrs) | Arrival Station | Arrival Time (in Hrs) |
|---|---|---|---|---|---|---|---|---|
| 12733 | TPTY | Tirupati | 18:25 | Secunderabad jn | 6:25 | 6:30 | Lingampalli | 7:10 |
| 12734 | LPI | Lingampalli | 17:30 | Secunderabad jn | 18:15 | 18:20 | Tirupati | 6:00 |
