= Padmavati Express =

Train in India

Padmavathi Express
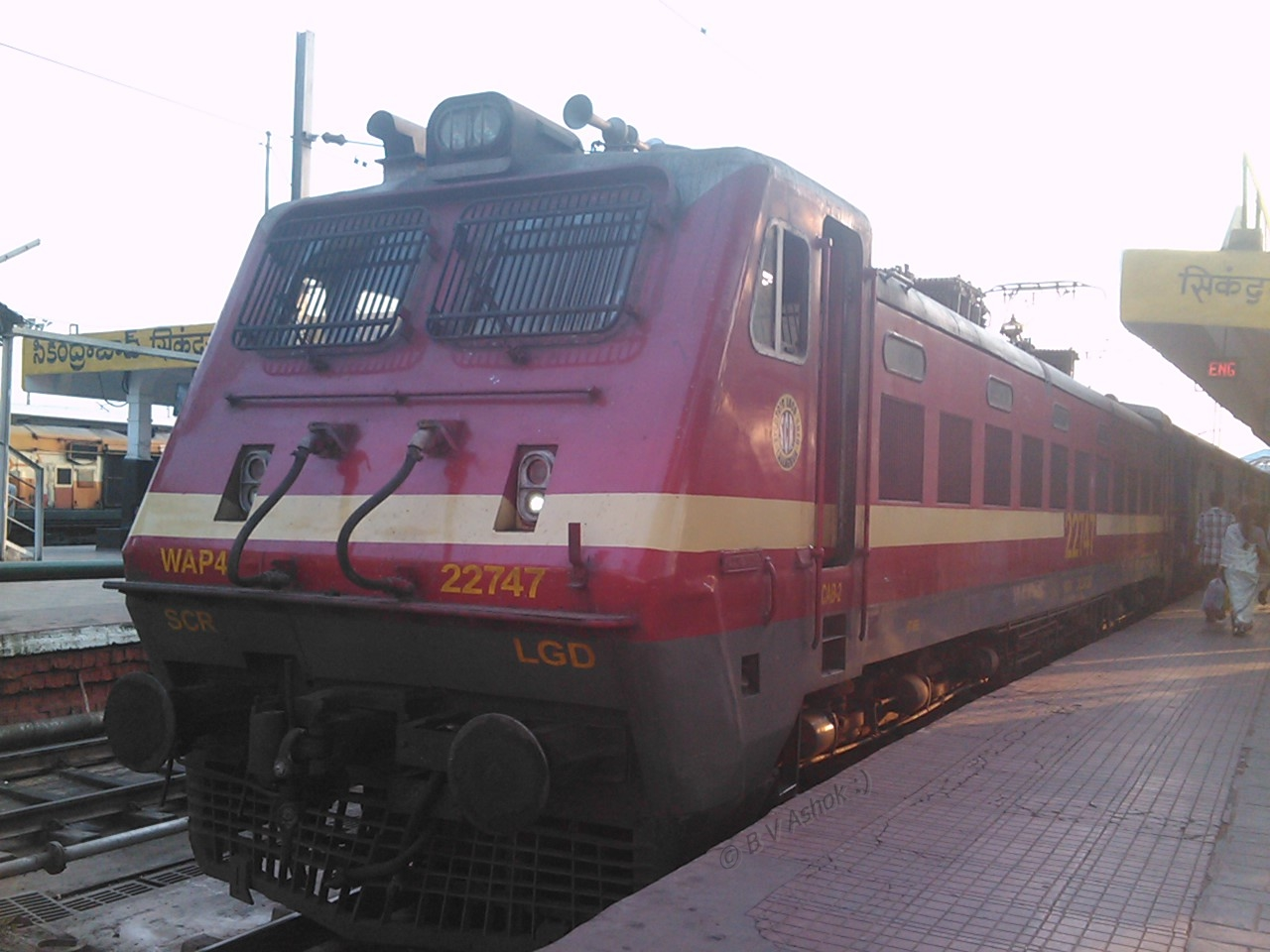
- Padmavathi Express at Secunderabad railway station

Overview
- Service type: Superfast
- Locale: Telangana & Andhra Pradesh
- First service: 9 November 2002; 23 years ago
- Current operator: South Coast Railway

Route
- Termini: Secunderabad (SC); Tirupati (TPTY)
- Stops: 19
- Distance travelled: 737 km (458 mi)
- Average journey time: 12 hours 15 minutes
- Train number: 12763 / 12764

On-board services
- Classes: AC 2 Tier, AC 3 Tier, Sleeper Class, General Unreserved
- Seating arrangements: Yes
- Sleeping arrangements: Yes
- Catering facilities: On-board catering, E-catering
- Observation facilities: Large Windows
- Baggage facilities: Available

Technical
- Rolling stock: LHB coach
- Track gauge: 1,676 mm (5 ft 6 in)
- Electrification: Yes
- Operating speed: 58 km/h (36 mph) average including halts.
Route map
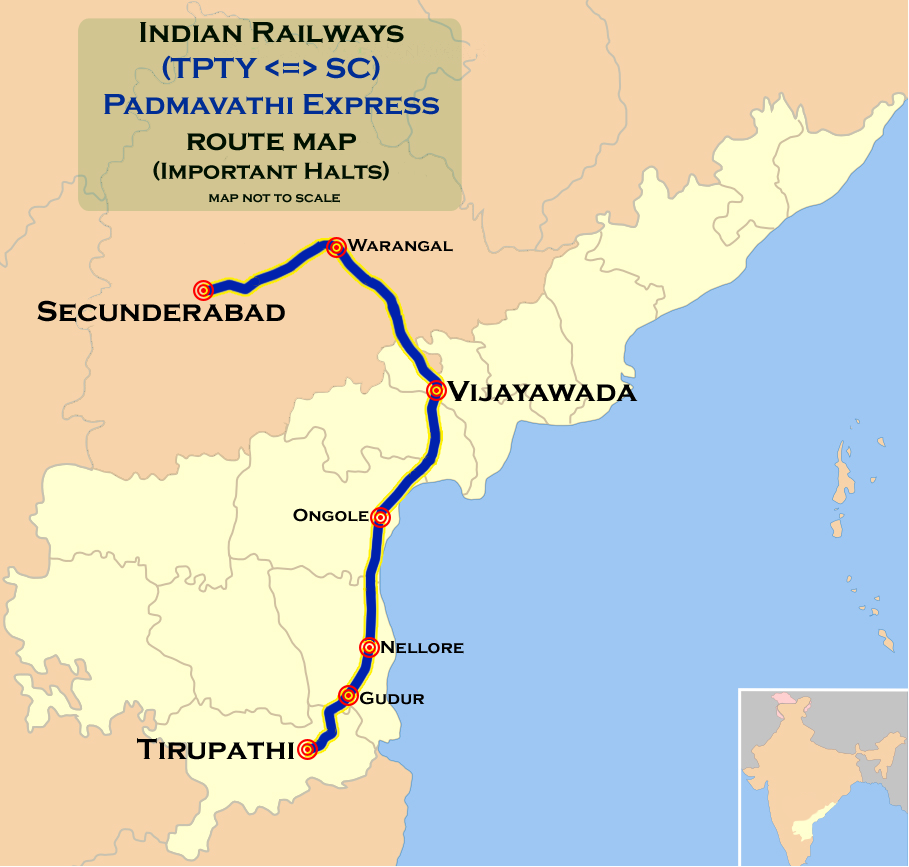
- Padmavati Express (Tirupathi – Secunderabad) Route map

The 12763 / 12764 Padmavathi Express is a superfast express train belonging to Indian Railways, connecting Secunderabad to Tirupati. The train belongs to the South Central Railway. It runs 5 days a week except Wednesday and Saturday, via Warangal, Vijayawada, Gudur.

== Background ==
It is named after goddess Padmavathi. The train departs from Secunderabad at 18:30 hours and arrives in Tirupati at 07:00 hours the next day. From Tirupati, the train departs at 17:00 hours and arrives in Secunderabad at 05:50 hours the next day.

== Route ==
Major stations on the route include Kazipet, Warangal, Khammam, Vijayawada, Tenali, Ongole, Nellore, Gudur, Srikalahasti and Renigunta.

== Loco links ==
It is hauled by a Lallaguda Loco Shed based WAP-7 electric locomotive from Secundrabad to Tirupati and vice versa.

== Classes ==
The train usually has a, 1 AC 2-Tier Coach, 3 AC 3-Tier Coaches, 13 Sleeper Class Coaches, and 3 General Compartments and 2SLR's. A rake of the Padmavati Express consists of 21 Coaches. It has rake sharing with Tirupati-Secunderabad Superfast Express (12731/12732)

== See also ==
- Narayanadri Express
- Venkatadri Express
