= Hyderabad railway division =

Railway division of India

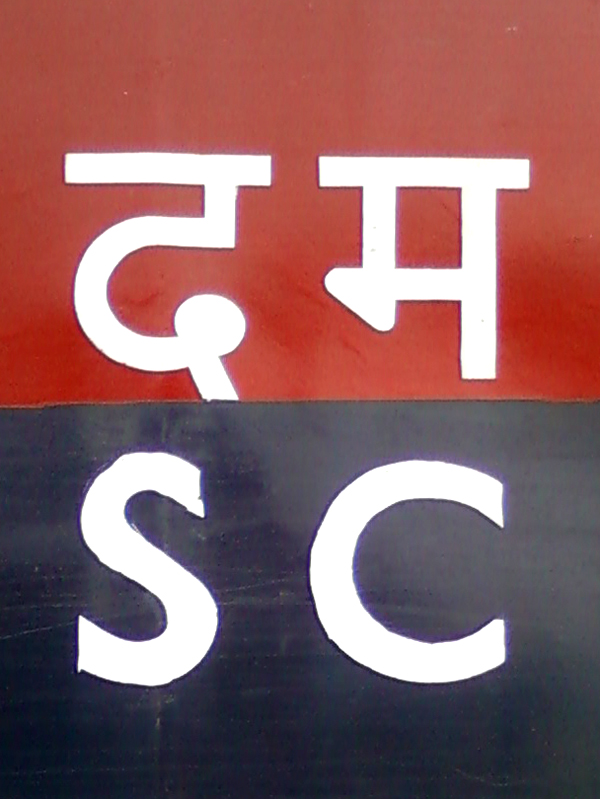

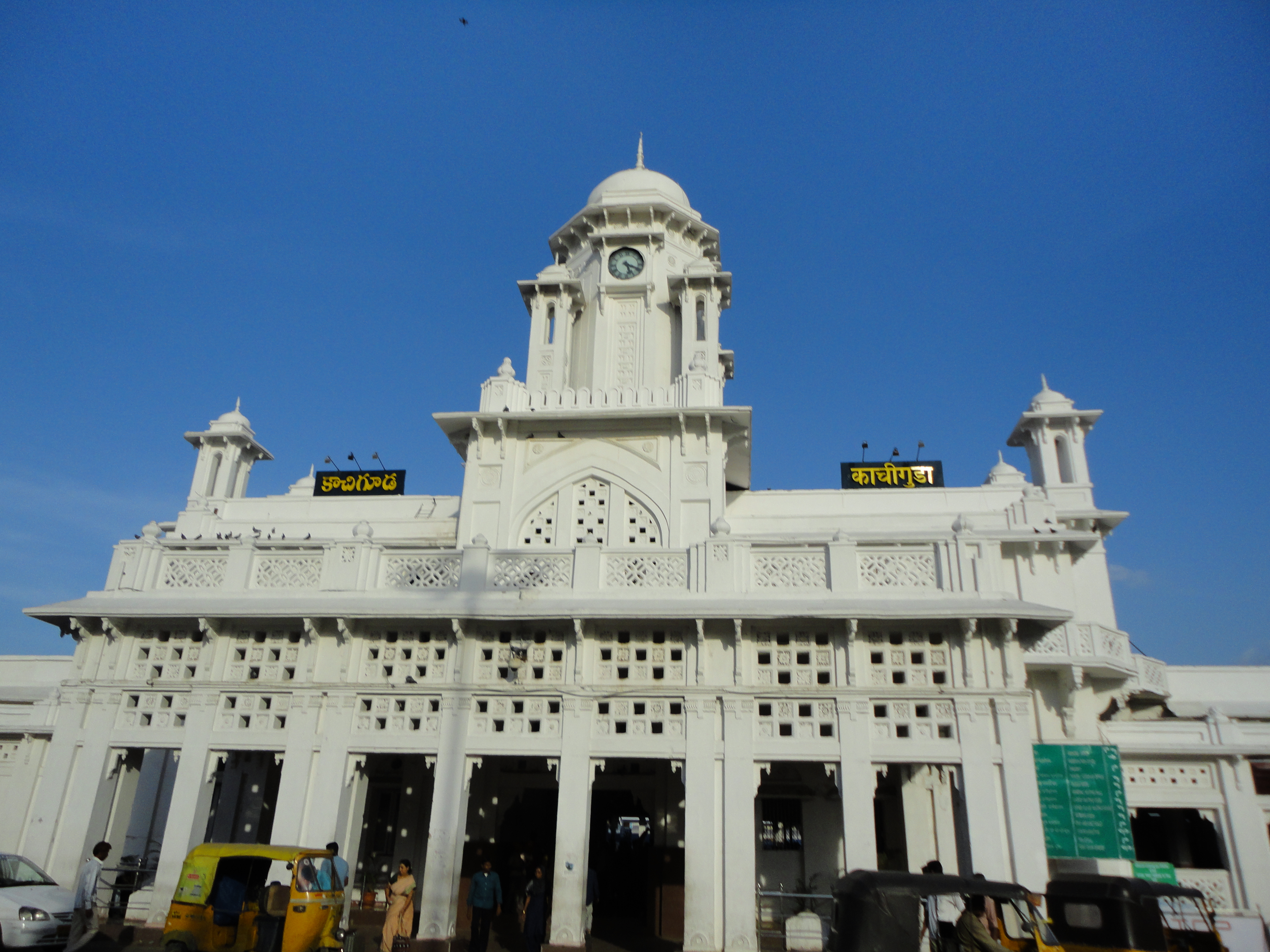
- Headquarters at Kacheguda

Overview
- Headquarters: Kacheguda
- Reporting mark: HYB
- Locale: Telangana, India
- Dates of operation: 1977; 49 years ago–
- Predecessor: Southern Railway zone

Technical
- Track gauge: 1,676 mm (5 ft 6 in)
- Electrification: 25 kV AC, 50 Hz
- Length: 653 kilometres (406 mi)

Other
- Website: www.scr.indianrailways.gov.in

Hyderabad railway division is one of the three divisions of South Central Railway zone of the Indian Railways. The headquarters of the Division is at Secunderabad and its zonal headquarters is at Secunderabad. Even though Hyderabad has its own Division, the Hyderabad Deccan railway station itself falls under Secunderabad Railway Division. Secunderabad–Manmad section also known as Kacheguda–Manmad line is an important Railway route connecting the States of Telangana and Maharashtra, most stations on this route are administered by Hyderabad Division and Nanded railway division.

== History ==
Hyderabad Division has carved out from Secunderabad railway division on 17 November 1976. In 2003 the Hyderabad division was further carved out to form Nanded railway division. The jurisdiction of Hyderabad division covers mainly the erstwhile Nizam's State Railway, passing through Telangana state and Rayalaseema areas of Andhra Pradesh, a small section of 47.63 kilometres (29.60 mi) from Dharmabad to Mudkhed lies in Maharashtra state and a section of 23 kilometres (14 mi) from Panduranga Swamy Road to Raichur lies in Karnataka.

== Structure ==
The division covers a route of 653 kilometres (406 mi) having total of 104 stations. The division is responsible for maintenance of almost all railway assets and estates in the twin cities of Hyderabad and Secunderabad.

== Routes ==
Section	Type of track	Traction	Distance
Secunderabad Jn (excl)-Mahbubnagar-Gadwal Jn-Dhone Jn(excl)(B.G.)	Double & Single	Electric	352.16 kilometres (218.82 mi)
Secunderabad (excl)Jn-Nizamabad Jn-Jankampet Jn-Mudkhed (excl)(B.G.)	Single	Electric	272.58 kilometres (169.37 mi)
Jankampet Jn-Bodhan (B.G.)	Single	Electric	20 kilometres (12 mi)
Gadwal Jn- Raichur Jn(excl)(B.G.)	Single	Electric	53.00 kilometres (32.93 mi)
Devarakadra Jn- Krishna(B.G.)	Single	Electric	66 kilometres (41 mi)
Manoharabad-Gajwel-Siddipet	Single	Diesel	75 kilometres (47 mi)
Akanapet (AKE)–Medak (MEDAK)	Single	Electric	17.2 kilometres (10.7 mi)
Total			

=== Under construction ===
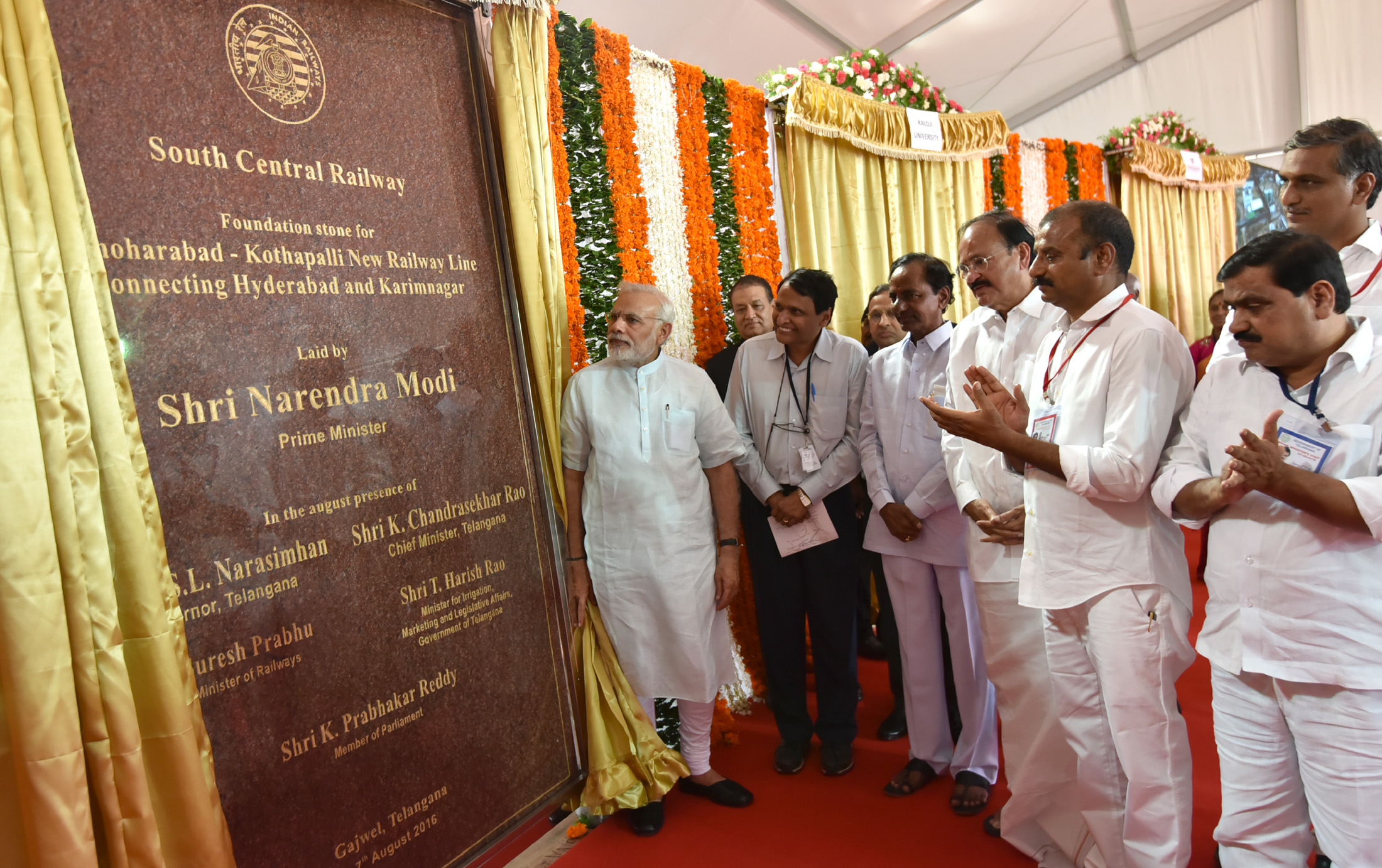
Kothapalli-Manoharabad railway foundation stone being laid

- Gajwel (GAJWL)-kothapalli(KPHI) - part of the Manoharabad-Kothapally new railway line, expected 2025 - 111 kilometres (69 mi)

== Major stations and categories ==
The list includes the stations under the Hyderabad division and their station category

Category	No. of stations	Names of stations
A-1; Annual earning > Rs. 50 crore	1	Kacheguda
A Annual earning Rs. 6 to 50 crore	2	Nizamabad Jn., Kurnool
B Annual earning Rs. 3 to 6 crore	3	Mahbubnagar, Gadwal, Basar, Kamareddy
C Suburban stations	9	Sitaphalmandi, Arts College, Jamai Osmania, Vidyanagar, Malakpet, Dabirpura, Yakutpura, Huppuguda, Falaknuma railway station
D Annual earning Rs. 1 to 3 crore	9	Dharmabad, Jadcherla, Shadnagar, Umdanagar, Umri, Bolarum, Malkajgiri, Wanaparthi Road
E Annual earning < 1 crore	39	
F Halt stations	41	
Total	104	

== See also ==
- Divisions of Indian Railways
