= JKM =

JKM or jkm may refer to:

- JKM, the Indian Railways station code for Jankampet Junction railway station, Telangana, India
- jkm, the ISO 639-3 code for Mopwa language, Myanmar and Tibet
