= HPG =

HPG may refer to:

- Huppuguda railway station, in Hyderabad, India
- Hypothalamic–pituitary–gonadal axis
- People's Defence Forces (Kurdish: Hêzên Parastina Gel), the armed wing of the Kurdistan Workers' Party
- Shennongjia Hongping Airport, in Hubei, China
- Highway Patrol Group of the Philippine National Police
- Holistic planned grazing (HPG)
