= Yakutpura railway station =

Railway station in Telangana, India

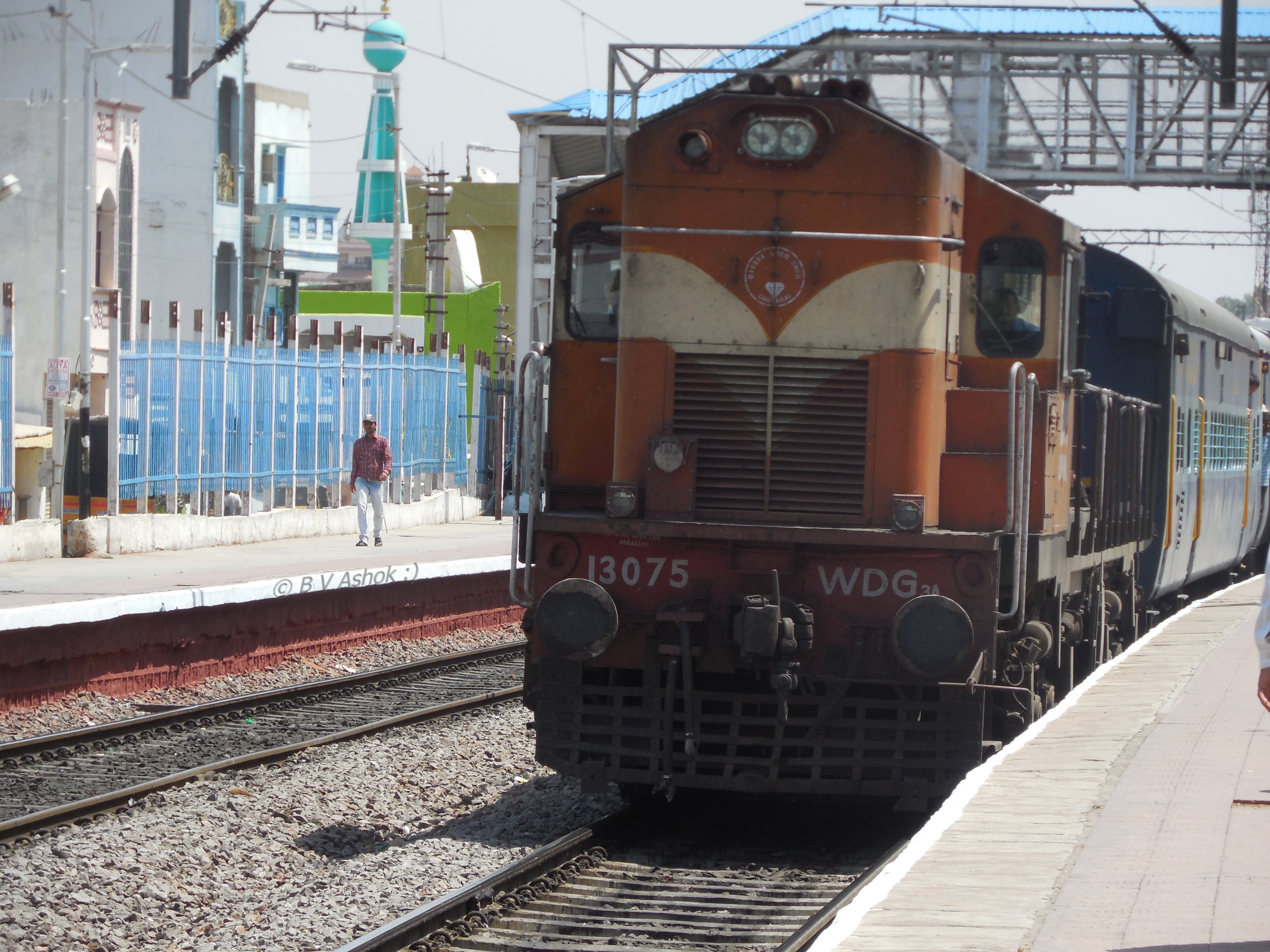
- Kacheguda Guntakal passenger at Yakutpura railway station

General information
- Location: Hyderabad; India
- Coordinates: 17.360°N 78.492°E
- System: Indian Railways and Hyderabad MMTS station
- Owner: Indian Railways
- Operator: South Central Railways
- Line: Secunderabad–Falaknuma route
- Platforms: 2
- Tracks: 2

Construction
- Structure type: At grade

Other information
- Status: Active
- Station code: YKA
- Zone(s): South Central Railway
- Division(s): Hyderabad
Location

Yakutpura railway station is a third grade suburban (SG–3) category Indian railway station in Hyderabad railway division of South Central Railway zone. It is located in Hyderabad of the Indian state of Telangana. It was selected as one of the 21 stations to be developed under Amrit Bharat Stations scheme.

== Lines ==
- Hyderabad Multi-Modal Transport System
  - Falaknuma–Secunderabad route
