= Sitaphalmandi railway station =

Railway station in Telangana, India

Sitafalmandi
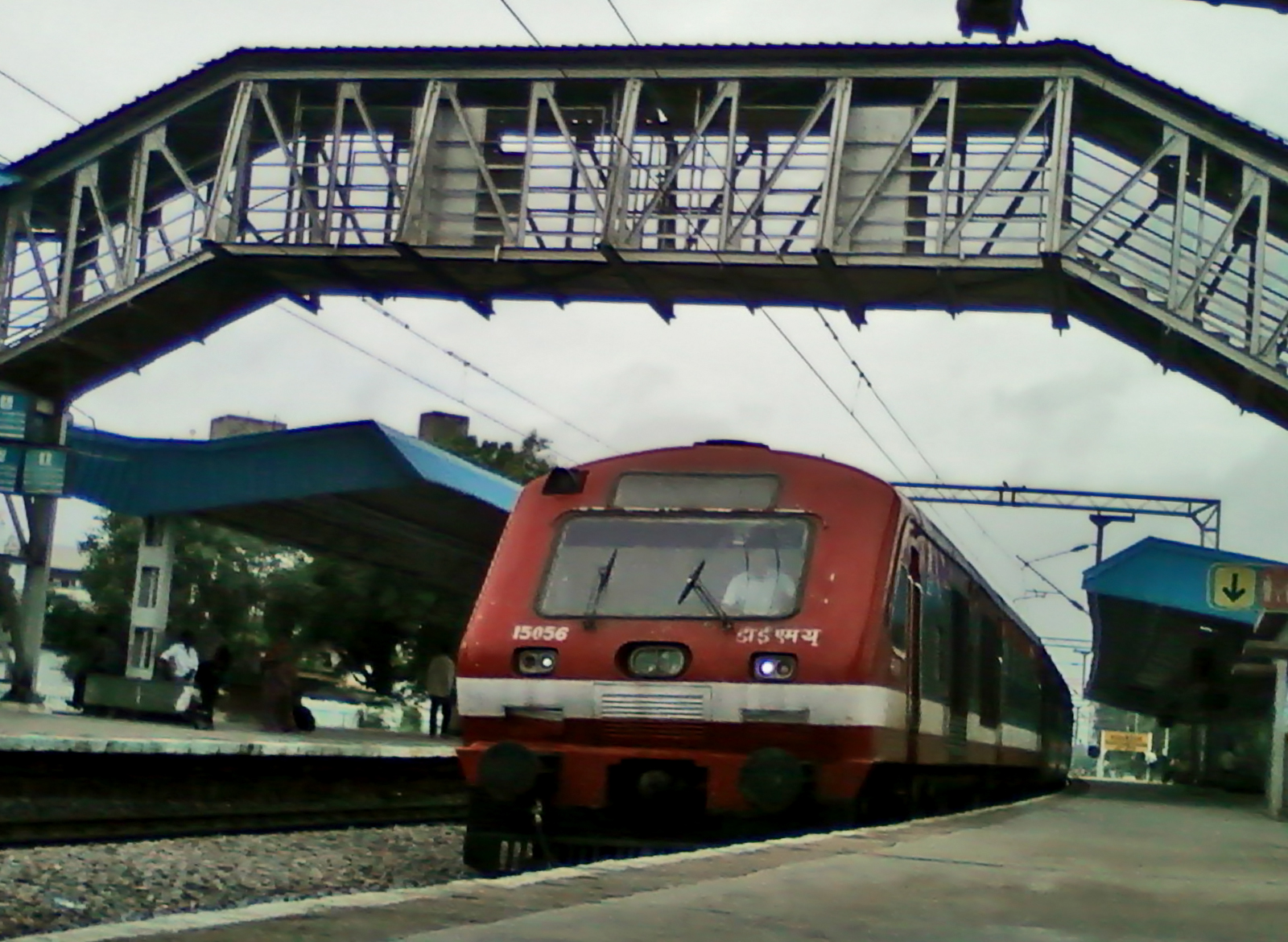
- Miryalguda Kacheguda DEMU at Sitafalmandi railway station

General information
- Other names: Sitaphalmandi
- Location: Secunderabad - 500061; Hyderabad; India
- Coordinates: 17.4280°N 78.5199°E
- Elevation: 531 metres (1,742 ft)
- System: Indian Railways and Hyderabad MMTS station
- Owner: Indian Railway
- Operator: South Cenral Railway
- Lines: Falaknuma–Lingampalli line Secunderabad–Falaknuma line Hyderabad–Falaknuma line
- Platforms: 4

Construction
- Structure type: At grade

Other information
- Station code: STPD
- Zone(s): South Central Railway
- Division(s): Hyderabad
Location
- Location within Hyderabad Location within India

Sitafalmandi railway station is a non-suburban-3 (NSG–3) category Indian railway station in Hyderabad railway division of South Central Railway zone. It is located in Hyderabad of the Indian state of Telangana.

Signboard of Sitafalmandi railway station

== Lines ==
- Hyderabad Multi-Modal Transport System
- Secunderabad–Falaknuma route
