= Golconda Express =

Train in India

Overview
- Service type: Express
- Locale: Telangana & Andhra Pradesh
- First service: 1 March 1969; 57 years ago
- Current operator: South Coast Railway

Route
- Termini: Guntur (GNT); Secunderabad (SC)
- Stops: 22
- Distance travelled: 385 km (239 mi)
- Average journey time: 8 hours 15 minutes
- Service frequency: Daily
- Train number: 17201 / 17202

On-board services
- Classes: AC Chair Car, Second Class Seating, General Unreserved
- Seating arrangements: Yes
- Sleeping arrangements: No
- Auto-rack arrangements: Overhead racks
- Catering facilities: On-board catering, E-catering
- Observation facilities: Rake sharing with 17233/17234 Bhagyanagar Express
- Baggage facilities: No
- Other facilities: Below the seats

Technical
- Rolling stock: LHB coach
- Track gauge: 1,676 mm (5 ft 6 in)
- Operating speed: 48 km/h (30 mph) average including halts.
Route map
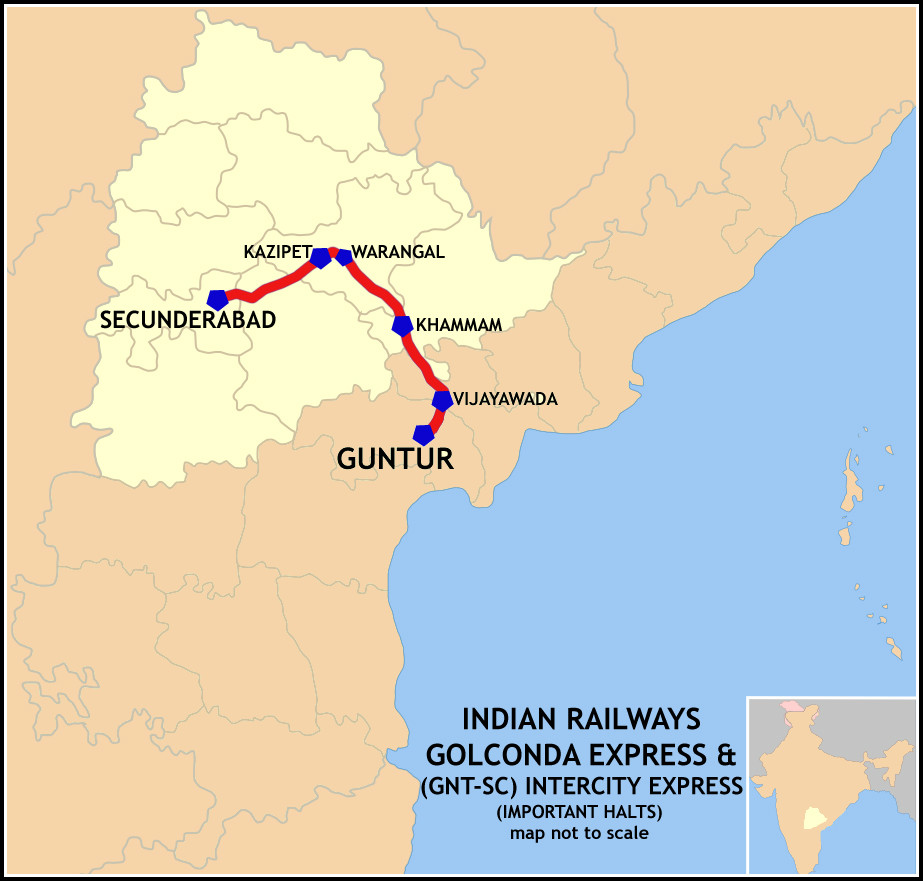

The 17201 / 17202 Golconda Express is an intercity express train running between Secunderabad and Guntur. It is provided with stoppage at Pedakakani railway station with effect from 1 May 2011.

== Etymology ==
This train is named after the historic Golconda Fort in Hyderabad. It is one of the important landmark in Hyderabad built by the Qutb Shahi dynasty of Hyderabad.

In 1973, this service was the fastest steam passenger train in India.

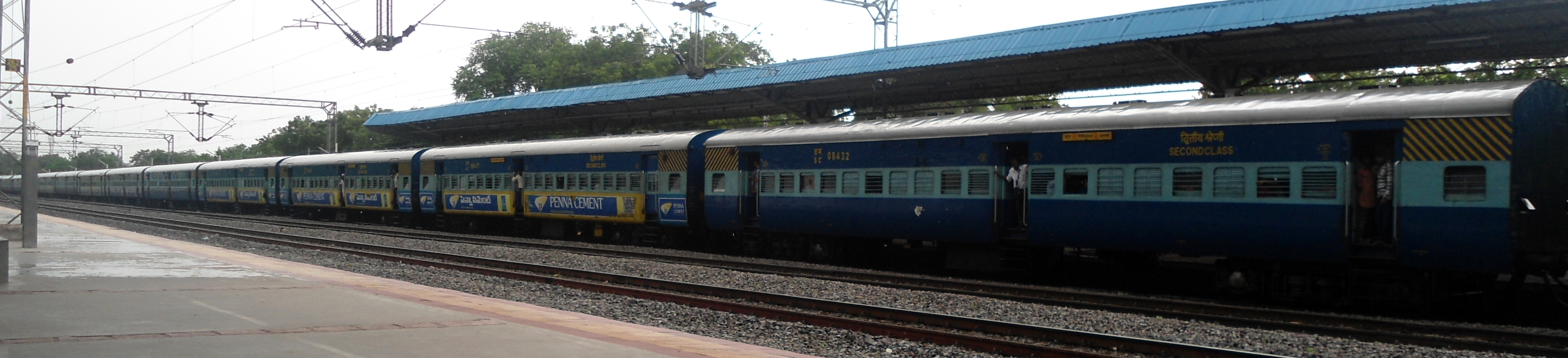
17202 Guntur bound Golconda Express

== Route & halts ==
The train runs from Guntur via Mangalagiri, Vijayawada, Kondapalli, Errupalem, Madhira, Khammam, Dornakal Junction, Garla ,Mahabububad, Warangal, Kazipet, Jangaon, Bhongir, Moula Ali Charlapalli to Secunderabad.

== Traction ==
It is hauled by a Lallaguda Loco Shed or Vijayawada Loco Shed-based WAP-7 electric locomotive on its entire journey.

== Rake sharing ==
The train shares its rake with 17233/17234 Bhagyanagar Express.

== Accidents and incidents ==
On the morning of 2 July 2003, part of the Secunderabad-bound Golconda Express fell from a bridge near Warangal, killing at least 21 people. In 1999, the train derailed near Ghanpur (Station) in Warangal district of Telangana.
