= Warangal train crash =

2003 Train accident in Telangana

Coordinates: 17.9736°N 79.6007°E

The Warangal train crash occurred on 2 July 2003 in the city of Warangal, Andhra Pradesh, India.

The Golconda Express passenger service from Guntur to Secunderabad was scheduled to stop at Warangal station mid-morning, but the driver failed to halt the train. He claimed that the brakes stopped working long before the service arrived at Warangal, and that his train was supposed to have been put onto a loop line around the station until the problem was fixed. This was done, but due to the speed, it jumped over the loop line and onto the road below the bridge situated just after the station as the driver lost control. The engine and two carriages broke through a concrete barrier and fell to the crowded street below, crushing several cars, market stalls and rickshaws.

The crash killed 22 and left more than 110 injured, some very seriously. Thirteen of the dead had been train passengers, the others people who had been in the streets below. Rescue work was severely hampered by the congested nature of the streets as well as heavy rainfall. Locals were able to pull many of the less seriously injured to safety before the emergency services finally arrived. The families of the dead were paid 100,000 rupees, more than is usual in Indian railway crashes.

The problem was believed to be the result of faulty brakes and poor communication between the train and the officials at Warangal station, neither of whom understood the full situation. The heavy rains compounded the problem, by reducing the friction of the rails and making it easier for the driver to lose control.
