= Jankampet Junction railway station =

Railway station in India

Jankampet Junction
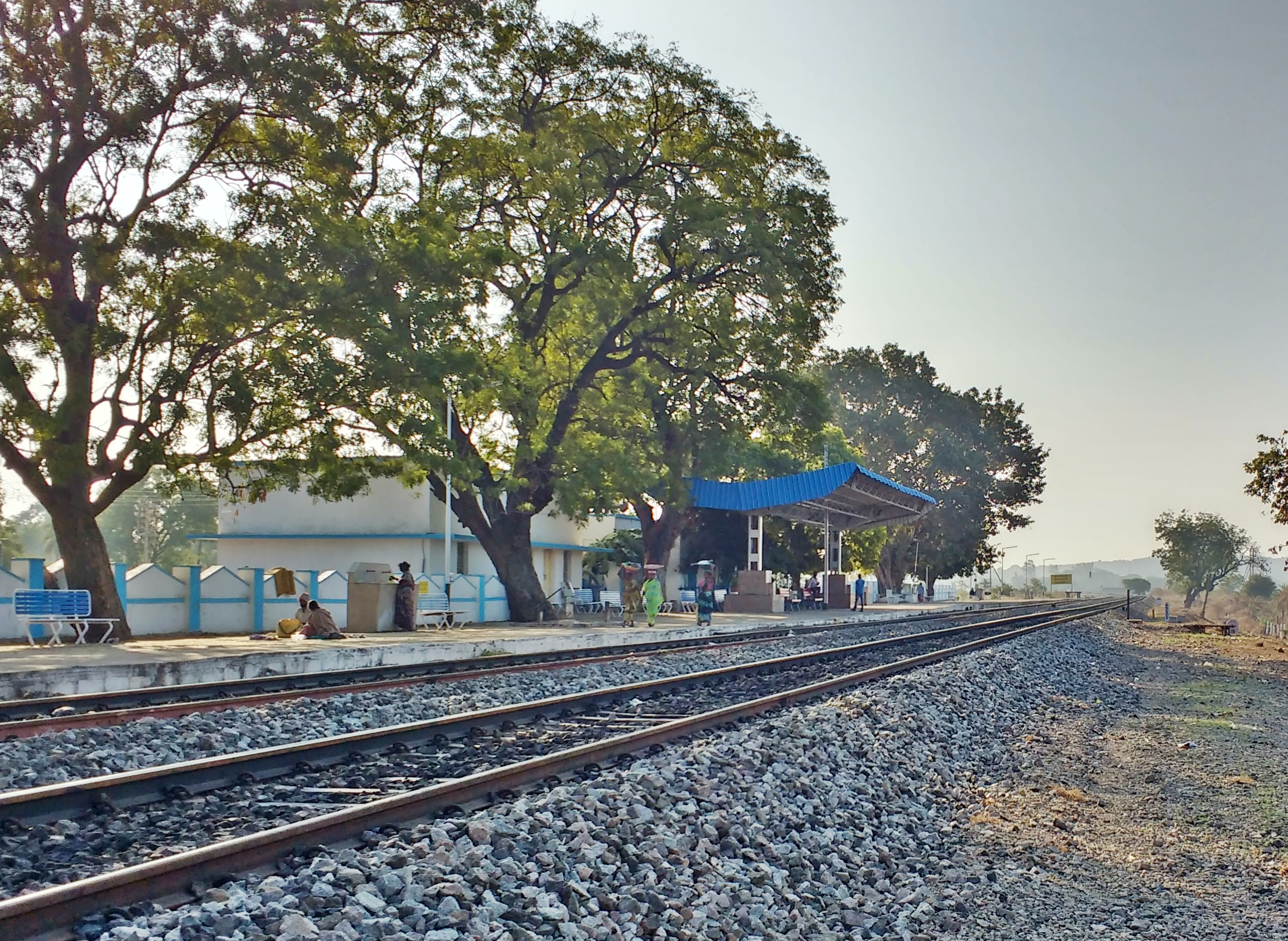
- Jankampat Junction

General information
- Location: Jankampet, Nizamabad, Telangana; India
- Coordinates: 18.6788°N 78.1036°E
- Elevation: 391 metres (1,283 ft)
- System: Passenger train station
- Line: Secunderabad–Manmad
- Platforms: 01
- Tracks: 02

Construction
- Structure type: Standard (on ground station)

Other information
- Status: Active
- Station code: JKM
- Zone(s): South Central Railway zone
- Division(s): Hyderabad
Location
- Location within Telangana Location within India

Jankampet Junction railway station (station code:JKM) is one of the two railway stations which serves the city of Nizamabad in Telangana state of India.

== Administration ==
It falls in Hyderabad railway division under the South Central Railway zone of Indian Railways. Due to overgrowth on the western side of Nizamabad, the Jankampet Junction railway station falls under the administration of Nizamabad.

== Line and location ==
It is just to the south of the junction where the branch railway from Bodhan meets the Secunderabad–Manmad line. Jankampet railway station is situated 10 kilometers away from Nizamabad Junction railway station.

== Routes ==
- Jankampet Jn–Nizamabad Jn/Secunderabad Jn
- Jankampet Jn–Mudkhed Jn
- Jankampet Jn–Bodhan
- In October 2023, the Karimnagar-Nizamabad MEMU was extended up to Bodhan.

== See also ==
- Nizamabad Junction
- List of railway junction stations in India
