= Arts College railway station =

Railway station in Hyderabad, India

Arts College ఆర్ట్స్ కాలేజ్ آرٹس کالج
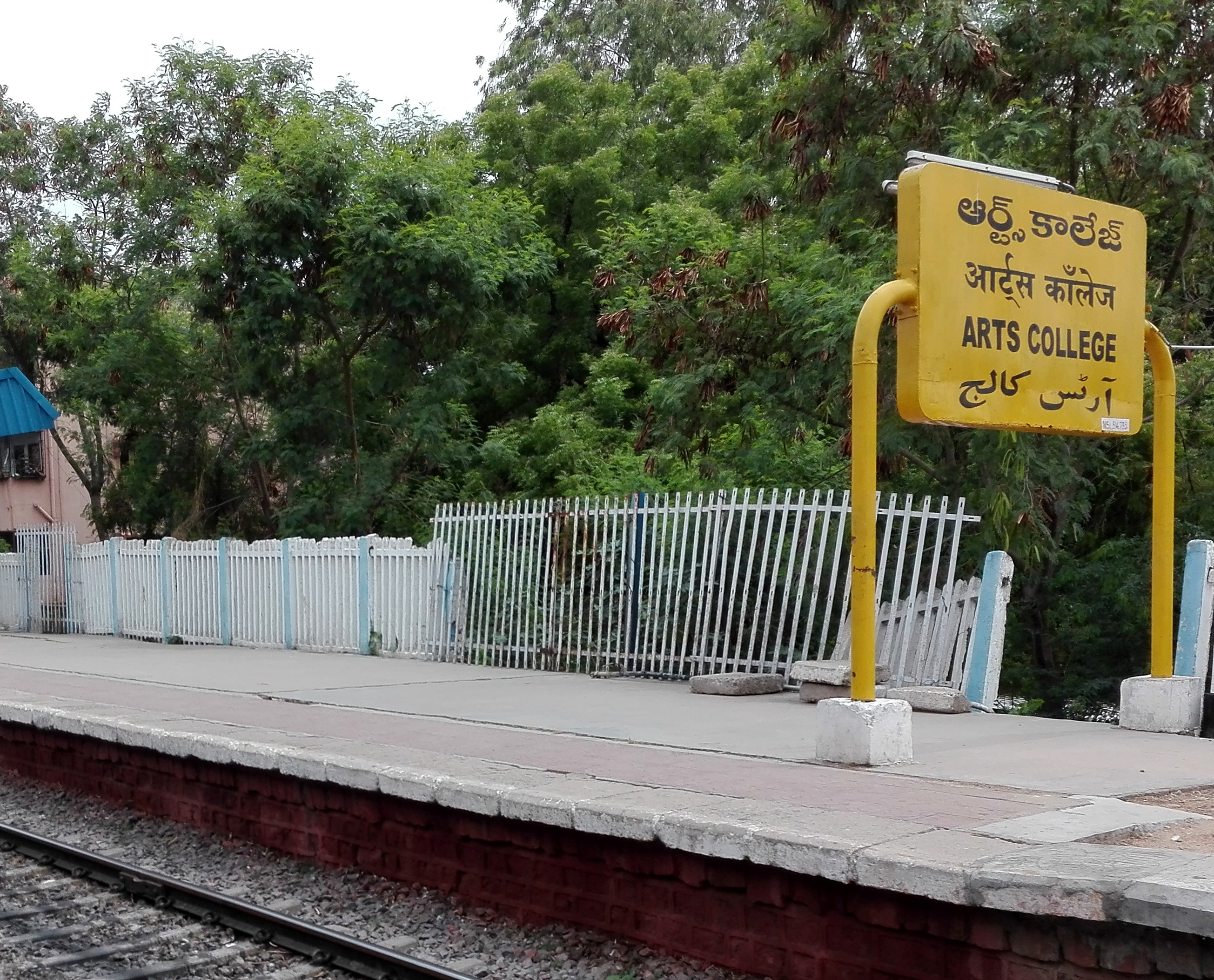
- Arts College MMTS Railway station North end

General information
- Location: Hyderabad, Telangana; India
- Coordinates: 17.418241°N 78.520011°E
- System: Indian Railways and Hyderabad MMTS station
- Owner: South Central Railway
- Operator: Hyderabad Multi-Modal Transport System
- Line: Secunderabad–Falaknuma route (SF Line)
- Platforms: 2

Construction
- Structure type: At grade

Other information
- Station code: ATC
- Zone(s): South Central Railway
- Division(s): Hyderabad
Location

Arts College railway station is a third grade suburban (SG–3) category Indian railway station in Hyderabad railway division of South Central Railway zone. It is located in Hyderabad of the Indian state of Telangana.

== Lines ==
- Hyderabad Multi-Modal Transport System
- Secunderabad–Falaknuma route (SF Line)
