= Secunderabad–Falaknuma route =

Secunderabad–Falaknuma Line

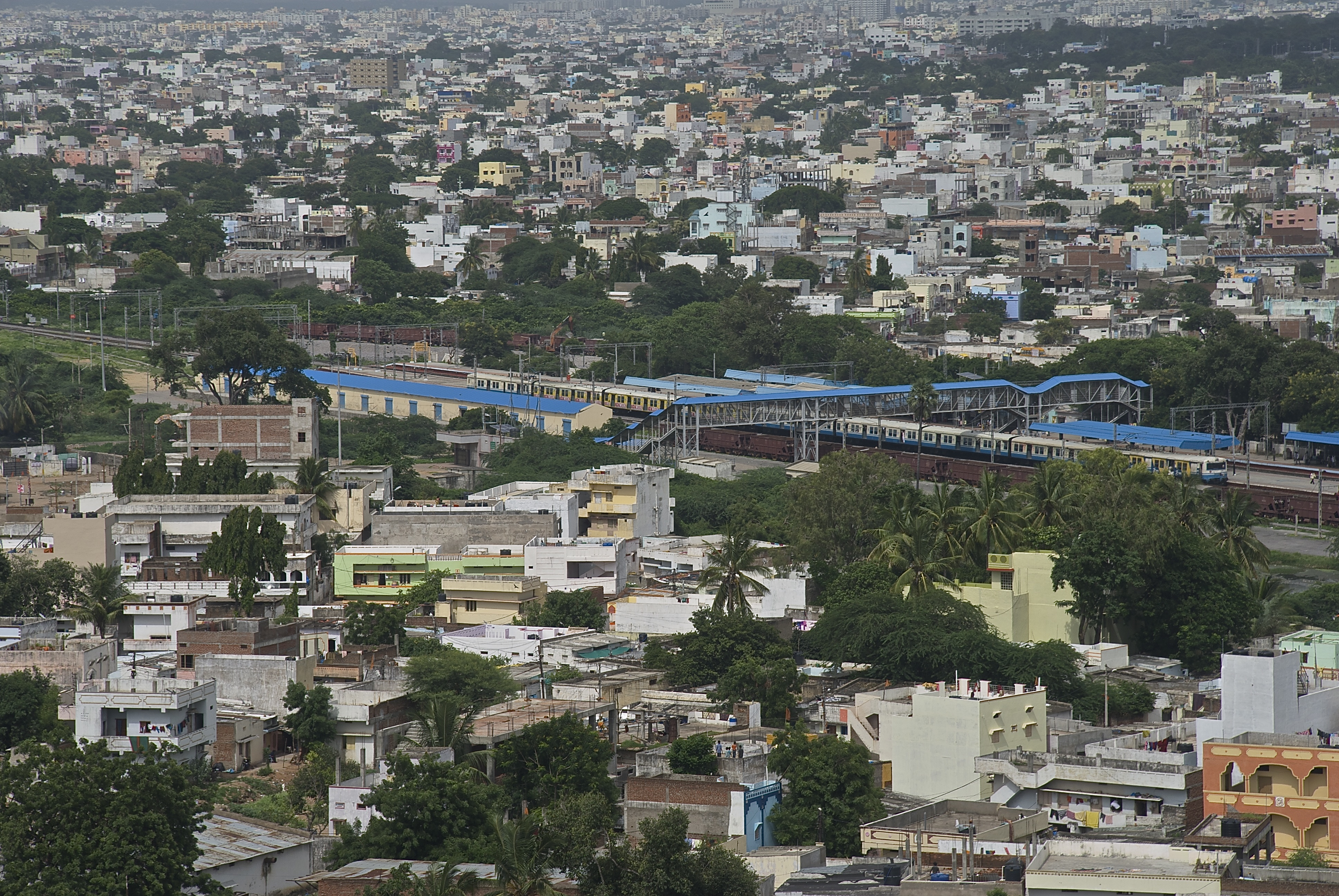
- Falaknuma Railway station as seen from Taj Falaknuma in 2013

Overview
- Owner: Government of Telangana; Indian Railways
- Termini: Secunderabad; Falaknuma
- Stations: 12

Service
- Type: Rapid transit
- System: Hyderabad Multi-Modal Transport System
- Operator: South Central Railway

History
- Opened: 14-02-2004

Technical
- Number of tracks: 2
- Character: Surface
- Track gauge: 4 ft 8 1/2 in (1,435 mm)
- Electrification: Yes
Route map
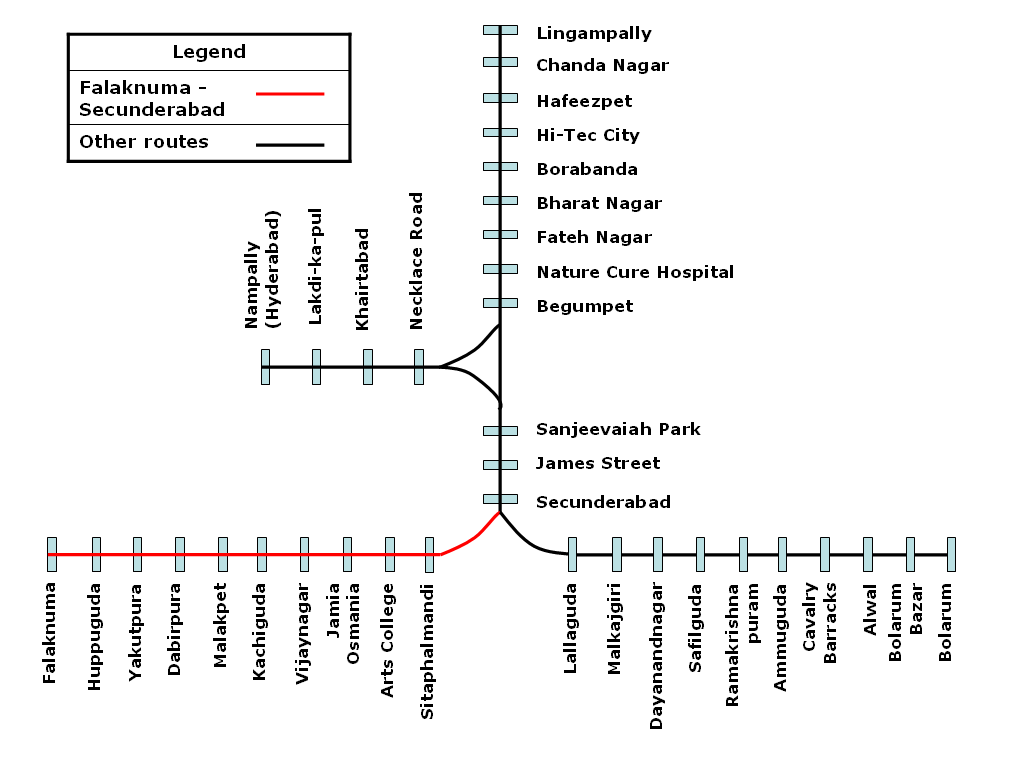

The Secunderabad–Falaknuma route (SF) is a rapid transit service of the Multi-Modal Transport System of Hyderabad, India. Spanning 12 stations, it runs between Secunderabad and Falaknuma twice a day.

== Stations ==
Secunderabad–Falaknuma
Station Code	Station Name	Connections
SC	Secunderabad	Secunderabad East metro station, Secunderabad West metro station
STPD	Sitaphalmandi	
ATC	Arts College	
JOO	Jamia Osmania	
VAR	Vidyanagar	
KCG	Kachiguda	
MXT	Malakpet	Malakpet metro station
DQR	Dabirpura	
YKA	Yakutpura	
HPG	Huppuguda	
FM	Falaknuma	
