= Dabirpura railway station =

Railway station in Telangana, India

Dabirpura

General information
- Coordinates: 17.360°N 78.492°E
- System: Indian Railways and Hyderabad MMTS station

Construction
- Structure type: At grade

Other information
- Station code: DQR
- Zone(s): South Central Railway
- Division(s): Hyderabad
Location

Dabirpura railway station is a third grade suburban (SG–3) category Indian railway station in Hyderabad railway division of South Central Railway zone. It is located in Hyderabad of the Indian state of Telangana.

== Lines ==
- Hyderabad Multi-Modal Transport System
- Secunderabad–Falaknuma route (SF Line)
