= Rail Nilayam =

Indian railway landmark building in Hyderabad

- రైల్ నిలయం
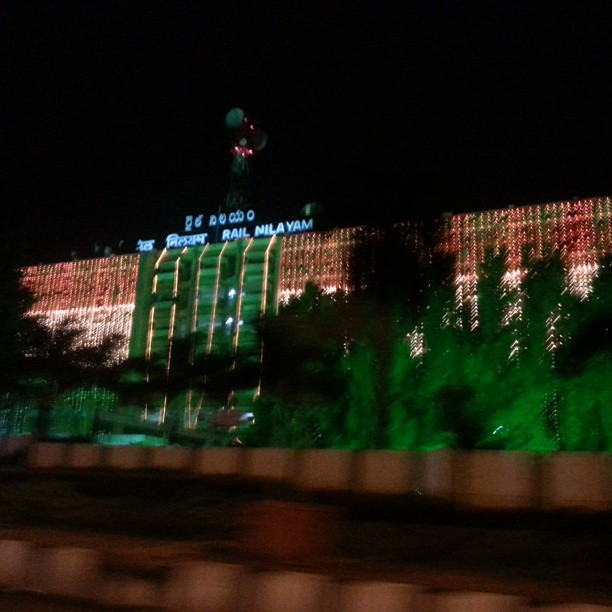
- Rail Nilayam, lit up with the Indian tricolor on the 67th Independence Day

- Location within Hyderabad Location within Telangana Location within India
- Alternative names: Rail Nilayam, Secunderabad

General information
- Status: Functioning
- Location: S Central Railway, Rail Nilayam Colony, Secunderabad, Telangana 500071, Hyderabad, Telangana, India
- Coordinates: 17.4386004°N 78.5108461°E
- Opened: 1972; 54 years ago
- Owner: Government of India

Website
- scr.indianrailways.gov.in/view_section.jsp?lang=0&id=0%2C1%2C283

Rail Nilayam is a landmark building in Hyderabad that is the zonal headquarters of the South Central Railway zone of the Indian Railways. It is located near the Marredpally neighbourhood of Secunderabad, Telangana, India.

The Office of General Manager, SCR Zone is located on the premises of this building. Apart from the GM, all top officials and department heads from various divisions of the SC Railway zone sit in this building. Rail Nilayam is the foremost policy-making body that takes all decisions pertaining to the functioning and operation in the SCR railway division.

The Indian Railways Institute of Signal Engineering & Telecommunications (IRISET), a premier centralised training institute on Indian Railways that imparts training in railway signalling & telecommunications is also located here.

== History ==
Rail Nilayam was inaugurated with ground floor to third floor in the year 1968 and the building was fully completed in the year 1972. The very First Digital Electronic Exchange was inaugurated on South Central Railway in July 1988 at Rail Nilayam.

In the year 2017, the building became the first fully LED-lit Zonal headquarters building of the Indian Railways. 3,048 conventional light fittings were replaced with energy efficient LED lights. Consequently, the connected load earlier, of conventional light fittings of Rail Nilayam that stood at 112.25 kW was reduced to 65.8KW after provision of the new LED lighting thereby lessening the connected load by 46.45 kW. This marked a major milestone in the efforts of Indian Railways towards energy conservation.

== See also ==
- South Central Railway zone
- MMTS Hyderabad
