= Bibinagar railway station =

Railway station in Telangana, India

Bibinagar
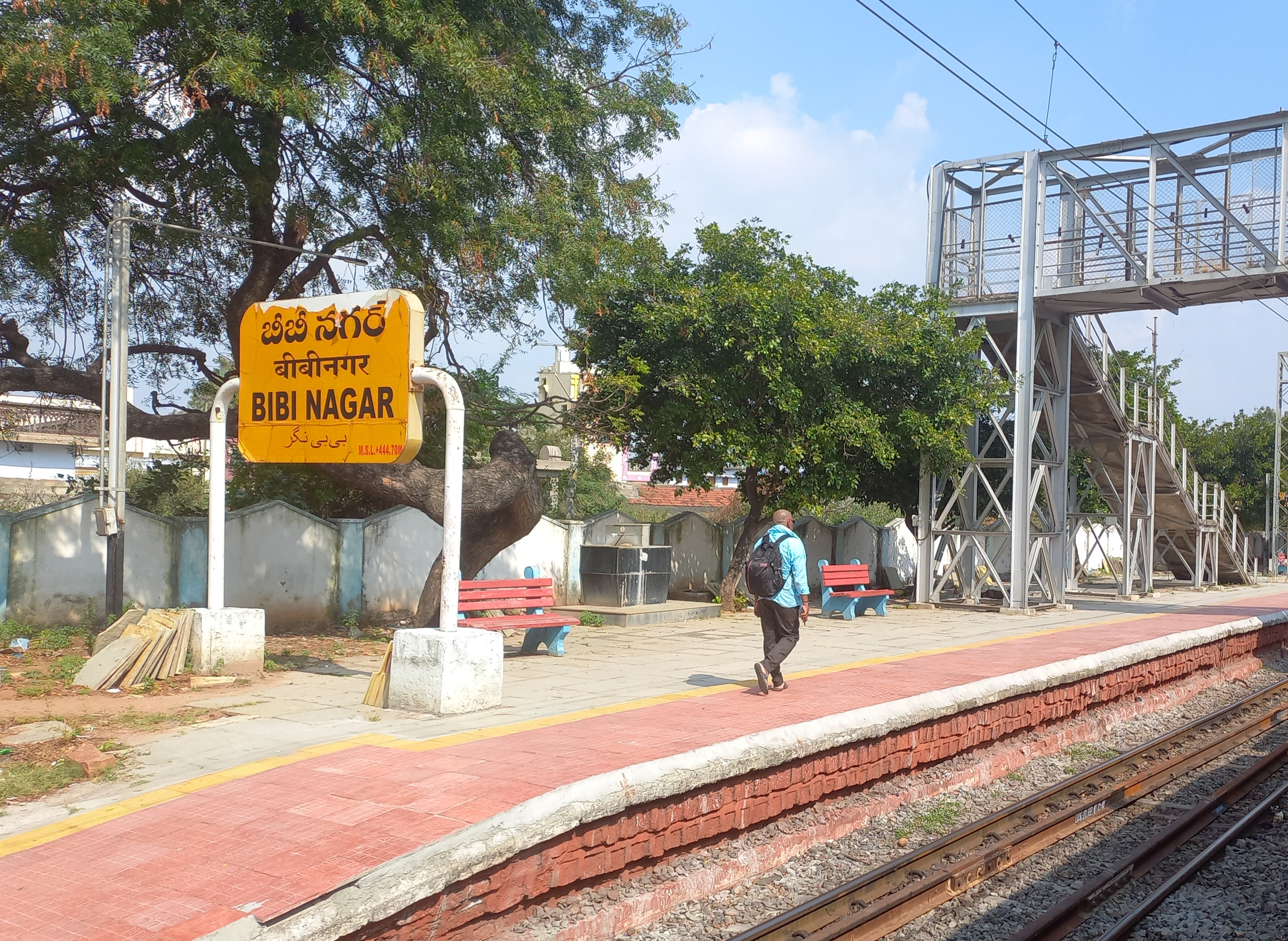

General information
- Location: Bibinagar, Bhuvanagiri district, Telangana; India
- Coordinates: 17°28′14.5″N 78°47′40″E
- System: Indian Railways station
- Tracks: 2

Construction
- Structure type: Standard (on ground station)

Other information
- Station code: BN
- Zone(s): South Central Railway
- Division(s): Vijayawada
Location
- Location within Telangana Location within India

Bibinagar railway station (station code:BN) is located in Bibinagar, Bhuvanagiri district which lies on the Kazipet–Secunderabad and Guntur–Secunderabad.

== Services ==
MEMU service starts at Bibinagar railway station and ends at the Falaknuma railway station.
