= Secunderabad Junction railway station =

Major railway station in Telangana, India

Secunderabad Junction
- Aerial view of the station

General information
- Location: Station Road, Railway Officer Colony, Botiguda, Bhoiguda, Secunderabad; Telangana; India
- Coordinates: 17°26′01″N 78°30′06″E
- Elevation: 535.60 metres (1,757.2 ft)
- System: Indian Railways; Hyderabad MMTS
- Owner: Indian Railways
- Operator: South Central Railways
- Lines: Secunderabad–Nagpur section, Wadi–Secunderabad–Kazipet–Vijayawada section, Secunderabad–Guntur section, Secunderabad–Manmad section, Secunderabad–Dhone section
- Platforms: 10 (Planning upto 11 Platforms)
- Tracks: 11
- Connections: Secunderabad West: Green Line; Secunderabad East: Blue Line

Construction
- Structure type: At-grade
- Parking: 350
- Accessible: Disabled access

Other information
- Status: Functioning ISO-9001 station
- Station code: SC
- Zone(s): South Central Railway zone
- Division(s): Secunderabad

History
- Opened: October 9, 1874; 152 years ago
- Electrified: 1993; 33 years ago
- Former names: Nizam's Guaranteed State Railway; Hyderabad–Godavari Valley Railway

Passengers
- 2023–24: 27,700,000
Location
- Location within Hyderabad Location within Telangana Location within India
- Interactive map

Secunderabad Junction railway station (station code: SC) is an NSG–1 category Indian railway station in Secunderabad railway division of South Central Railway zone. It is the major Railway Junction in the city of Hyderabad, Telangana, India. It is one of the busiest railway stations in South India and one of the most important hubs in the country and is a commuter rail hub in the Hyderabad urban area. Built in 1874 by the Nizam of Hyderabad during the British era, it was the main station of Nizam's Guaranteed State Railway until the Kacheguda railway station opened in 1916. The station was taken over by Indian Railways in 1951, when NGSR was nationalised. Its main portico and concourse are influenced by Nizamesque architecture. The station, which resembles a fort, is a tourist attraction in the twin cities of Hyderabad and Secunderabad.

It is connected by rail to all regions of India. About 170,000 passengers arrive at (or depart from) the station daily on 229 trains. On the Vijayawada–Wadi (the SCR's main line) and Secunderabad–Manmad railway lines, it is the zone headquarters of the South Central Railway and the headquarters of the SCR's Secunderabad Division. The station has received ISO-9001 certification for quality management in ticket booking, parcel and luggage booking and platform management. Indian Railways has proposed an upgrade to a world-class station, emphasising vertical expansion. It is connected to nearly all the parts of the twin cities by the Hyderabad MMTS, Telangana State Road Transport Corporation buses and the Hyderabad Metro. It is one of the top 100 booking stations in the Indian Railways.

== History ==
=== Nizam era ===
The station was proposed in 1870, when the Nizam of Hyderabad Mir Mahboob Ali Khan Siddiqi ordered to construct the secundrabad railway station, the sixth Nizam of Hyderabad state decided to connect Hyderabad State with the rest of India. Nizam's Guaranteed State Railway was formed as a private company, and construction of the Secunderabad–Wadi line began that year. The line, which would connect Hyderabad with the British Raj's Great Indian Peninsula Railway main line at Wadi Junction, was funded by the Nizam.

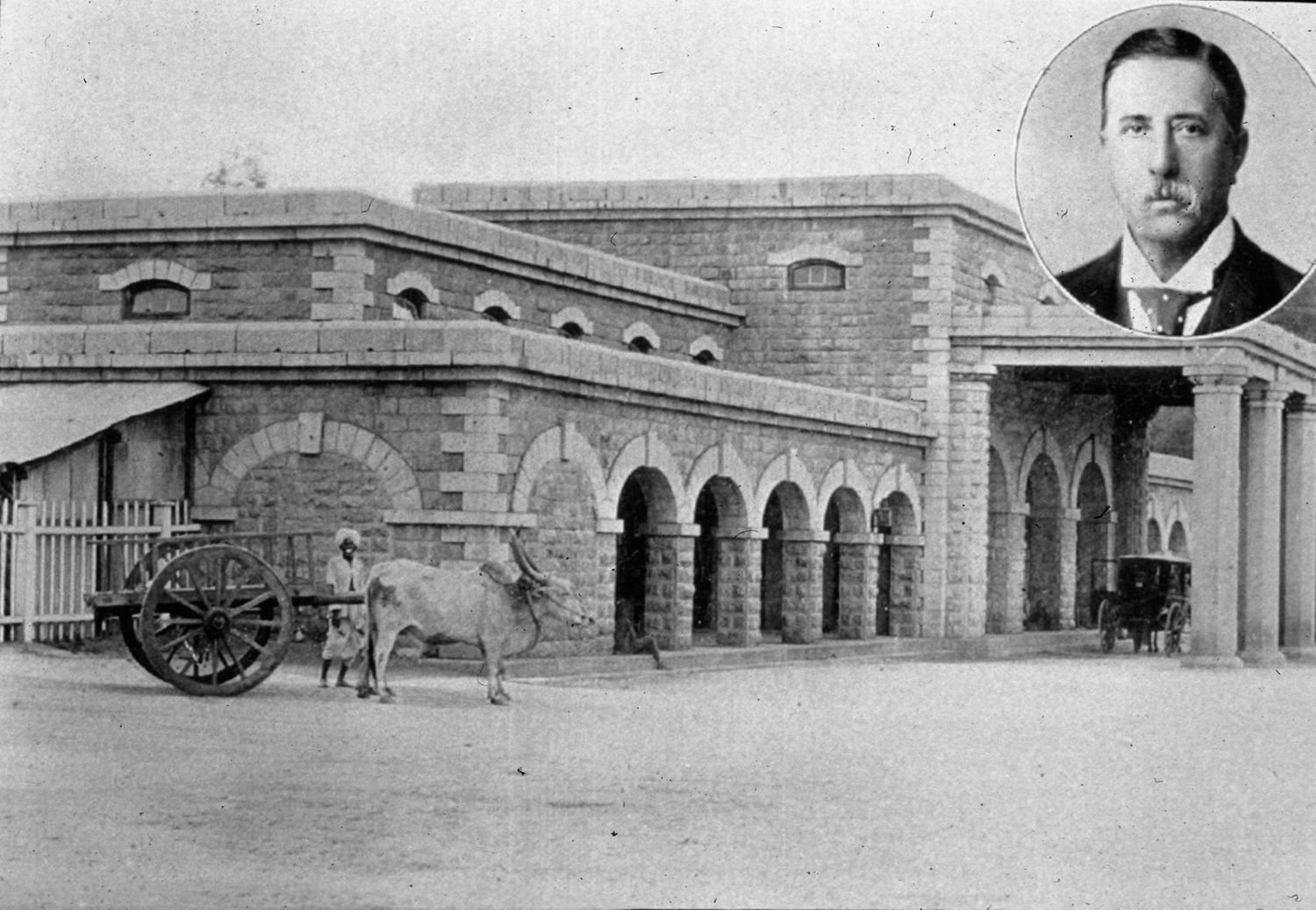
Secunderabad railway station in 1874

The Secunderabad–Wadi line and the Secunderabad railway station were finished on 9 October 1874, introducing railways to Hyderabad. The station's main portico and concourse were influenced by Nizam-era architecture. Resembling a fort, it is a tourist attraction in the twin cities. Hyderabad State took over the railway in 1879.

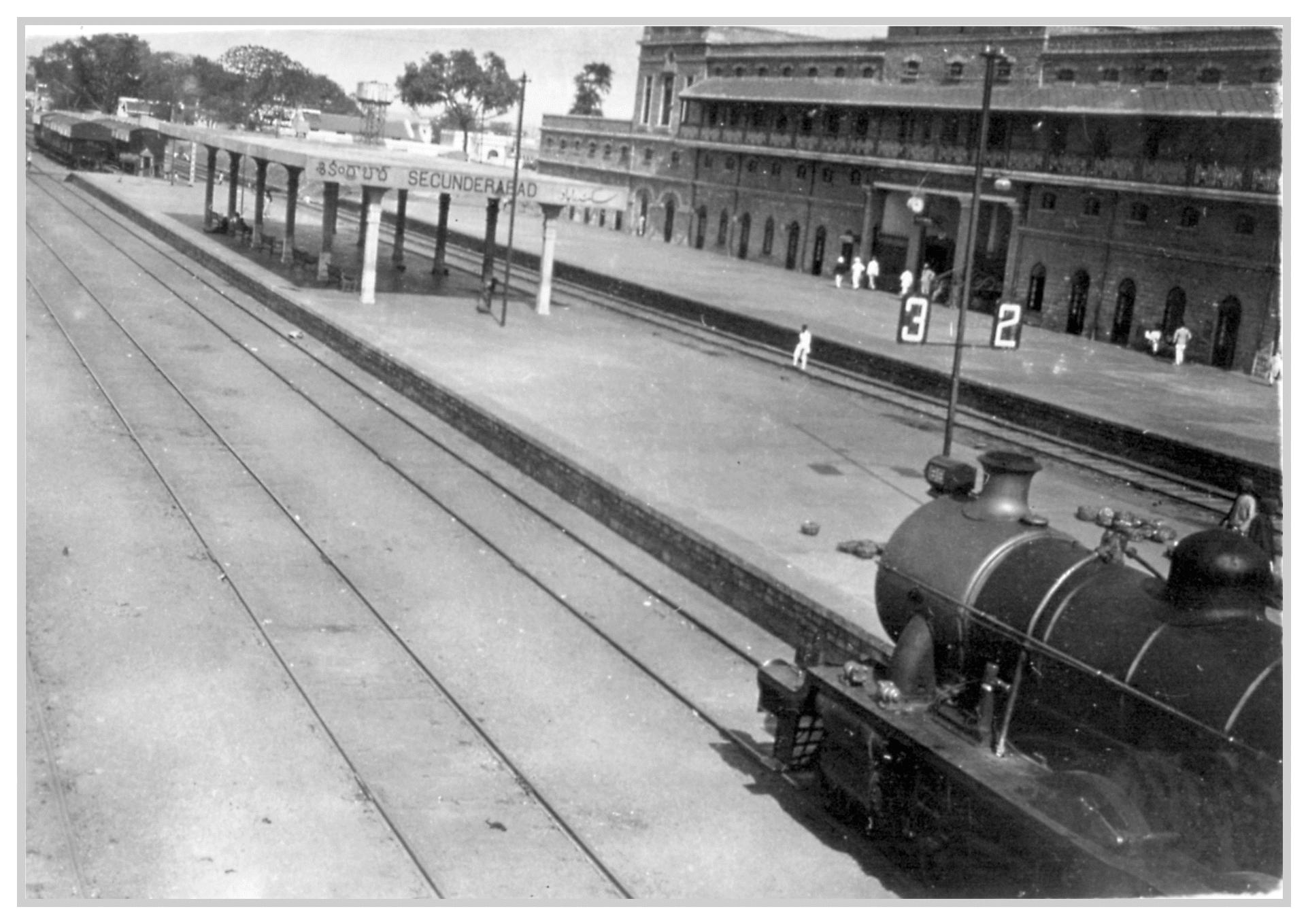
Locomotive pulling into the station around 1928

In 1871, the Secunderabad station was connected to the Singareni Collieries Company by a 146-mile (235 km) line. The Secunderabad–Wadi line was extended to Vijayawada Junction as the Vijayawada–Wadi line in 1889. A broad-gauge connection between Vijayawada Junction and Chennai Central opened the following year, enabling rail travel between Hyderabad and Chennai (then Madras).

The Hyderabad–Godavari Valley Railway was established in 1900 with the opening of the Manmad–Secunderabad metre-gauge line, and merged into the NGSR in 1930. In 1916, the Kachiguda railway station was built as NGSR headquarters and to regulate traffic at Secunderabad. Diesel rail cars manufactured by Ganz were tried for the first time in Hyderabad State by the NGSR in 1939.

=== Indian Railways ===
On 5 November 1951, Nizam's Guaranteed State Railway was nationalised by the government of India and merged into the government-owned Indian Railways (IR) as part of the Ministry of Railways. The Secunderabad station was assigned to the Central Railway zone, with Victoria Terminus its headquarters. In 1966, the South Central Railway zone was formed with Secunderabad its headquarters (as well as the headquarters of Indian Railways' Secunderabad Division. Rail Nilayam (the zone headquarters) was built in 1972, and the division headquarters was built in 1980.

The Indian Railways Institute of Signal Engineering and Telecommunications (IRISET), one of IR's six centralised training institutes, was established in Secunderabad by the Ministry of Railways on 24 November 1957. to address the specialised training needs of railway staff and officers in railway signalling and telecommunications. In 1967, the Ajanta Express was introduced between Kachiguda and Manmad via Secunderabad. With an average speed of 42.5 kilometres per hour (26.4 mph), it was India's fastest metre-gauge train at the time. The Secunderabad–Vijayawada Junction Golconda Express was introduced in 1969. The country's fastest steam train, with an average speed of 58 kilometres per hour (36 mph). it was later extended to Guntur. In February 1978, the Secunderabad Division was split into two divisions: Secunderabad and Hyderabad.

Although an early computerised reservation system began at Secunderabad in July 1989, the 30 September 1989 introduction of SCR's computerised Passenger Reservation System (PRS) at the station made reservations easier. The system, later linked to New Delhi (1997), Howrah (1998), Mumbai and Chennai (both 1999), preceded the CONCERT reservation system which was developed at Secunderabad in September 1994 and implemented in January 1995.

The Secunderabad–Mahbubnagar metre-gauge section was converted to broad gauge in 1993, breaking an important north–south metre-gauge freight connection north from Secunderabad. That year, the Secunderabad station was electrified towards Kazipet and Vijayawada Junction. The electric-locomotive shed in South Lallaguda (near the Secunderabad station), with a capacity of 100 locomotives, was built in 1995.

=== 21st century ===
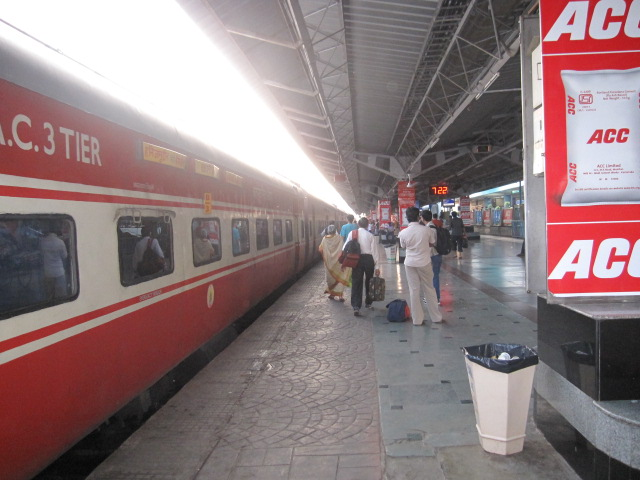
Rajdhani Express at the station

The Rajdhani Express, which connects India's state capitals with New Delhi (the national capital), was proposed in Andhra Pradesh between Secunderabad and the Hazrat Nizamuddin railway station in the 2001 Indian rail budget. The Secunderabad Rajdhani Express was introduced on 27 February 2002. The Hyderabad Multi-Modal Transport System (MMTS), the state's first of its kind, was introduced in 2003 with two lines: Lingampally–Hyderabad railway station (initially 13 trains daily) and Lingampally– Secunderabad (11 trains daily). Another line was built between Secunderabad and Falaknuma railway station. SCR operated the last metre-gauge train on the Nizamabad–Manoharabad line on 30 June 2004, ending metre-gauge service (which began during the 1930s on the Secunderabad–Manmad line of the NGSR) to facilitate IR's broad-gauge track-conversion program. The line was open by 7 February 2005 after the conversion, permitting railway traffic on the Secunderabad–Manmad stretch of the Kachiguda–Manmad line.

SCR introduced the Himalaya Special freight train at Secunderabad on 7 November 2007. Intended for the high-speed transport of freight such as coal, the train was expected to run at 100 kilometres per hour (62 mph). The 2008–2009 Rail Budget provided for Secunderabad to upgrade to a world-class station. SCR's first Duronto Express, between Secunderabad and Hazrat Nizamuddin railway station, was flagged off by then Andhra Pradesh Chief Minister Konijeti Rosaiah at Secunderabad on 14 March 2010.

== Station ==
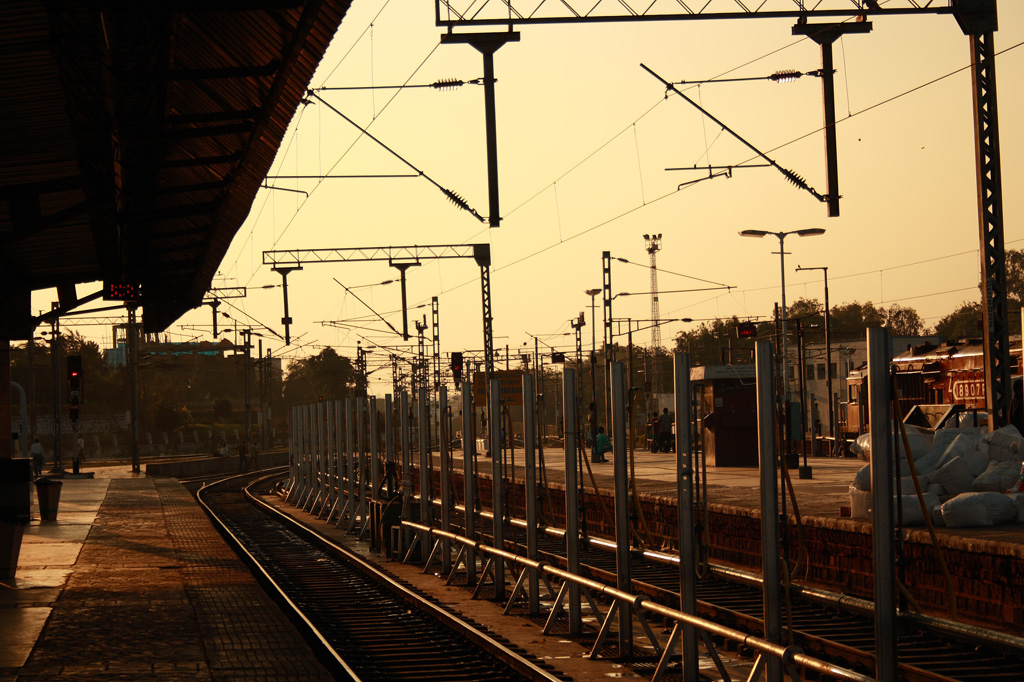
Platform 10 at twilight

Secunderabad is one of India's largest and busiest railway stations. The main railway terminus and a commuter hub in the Hyderabad urban area, it is one of three major stations serving the city; the other two are Kacheguda railway station and the Hyderabad Deccan railway station.

The station is the zonal headquarters of South Central Railways. and the headquarters of the Secunderabad Division. It is the busiest railway station in the state and SCR's Second-largest junction, after Vijayawada Junction. To reduce traffic at Secunderabad, the Railway Board has decided on a fourth major station in Hyderabad. There are two proposals for the new terminal: Malkajgiri and Moula-Ali.

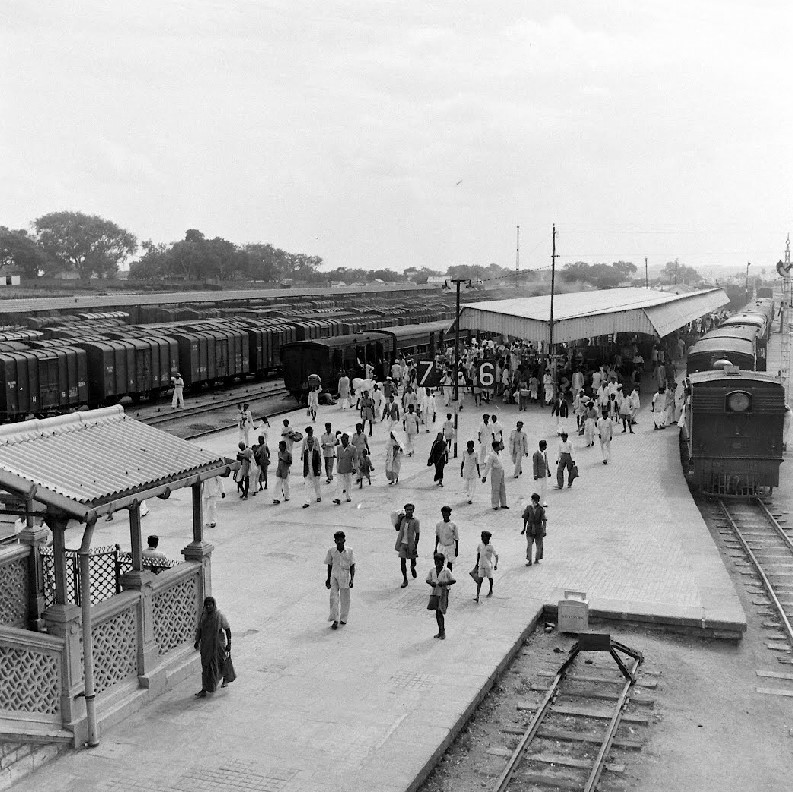
Platforms No. 6 and 7 in 1940s

Secunderabad Station has a standard station layout. All its tracks are broad-gauge and electrified. The Secunderabad–Manmad line is non-electrified, however, so diesel trains are common.

The station has ten platforms, which are covered by a reinforced concrete roof. Each platform can handle a train with more than 24 coaches. There is an additional track between platforms seven and eight, which is a service track for the Hyderabad Multi-Modal Transport System and suburban trains (where two trains halt at the same platform, due to their short length). Platforms six and seven are divided in two (6A and B and 7A and B).

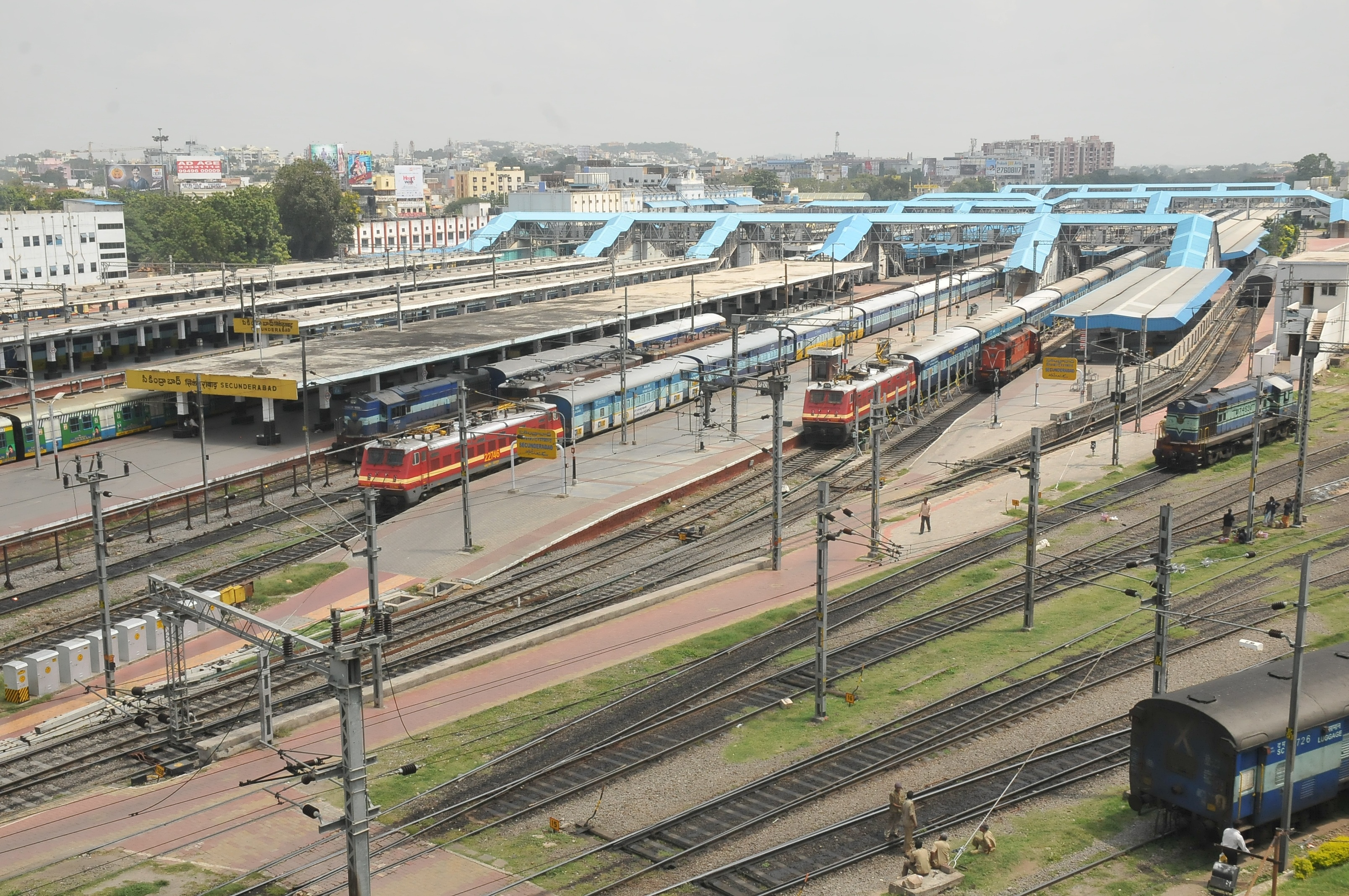
A view of all platforms of the station in 2011

Platform use is:

- 1 and 2: Long distance, inter-city express trains, such as the Rajdhani Express, Garib Rath Express, and Telangana Express
- 3–5: Inter-city express trains with fewer passengers; most are regional trains.
- 6A,6B and 7A,7B: Hyderabad MMTS and suburban rail
- 8: Regional and some mail express trains
- 9: Special trains or other trains at peak hours
- 10: High-speed, long-distance express trains

Secunderabad is a junction of tracks from five directions:

- Secunderabad–Kacheguda–Dhone and onwards to Guntakal.
- Secunderabad–Nizamabad–Hazur Sahib Nanded and onwards to Manmad Junction.
- Secunderabad–Wadi Junction and onwards to Mumbai/Bengaluru
- Secunderabad–Bibinagar–Kazipet and onwards to Nagpur/Vijayawada.
- Secunderabad–Bibinagar–Nalgonda and onwards to Guntur/Repalle.

The Vijayawada–Secunderabad and Repalle–Secunderabad lines join at Bibinagar.

== Service ==
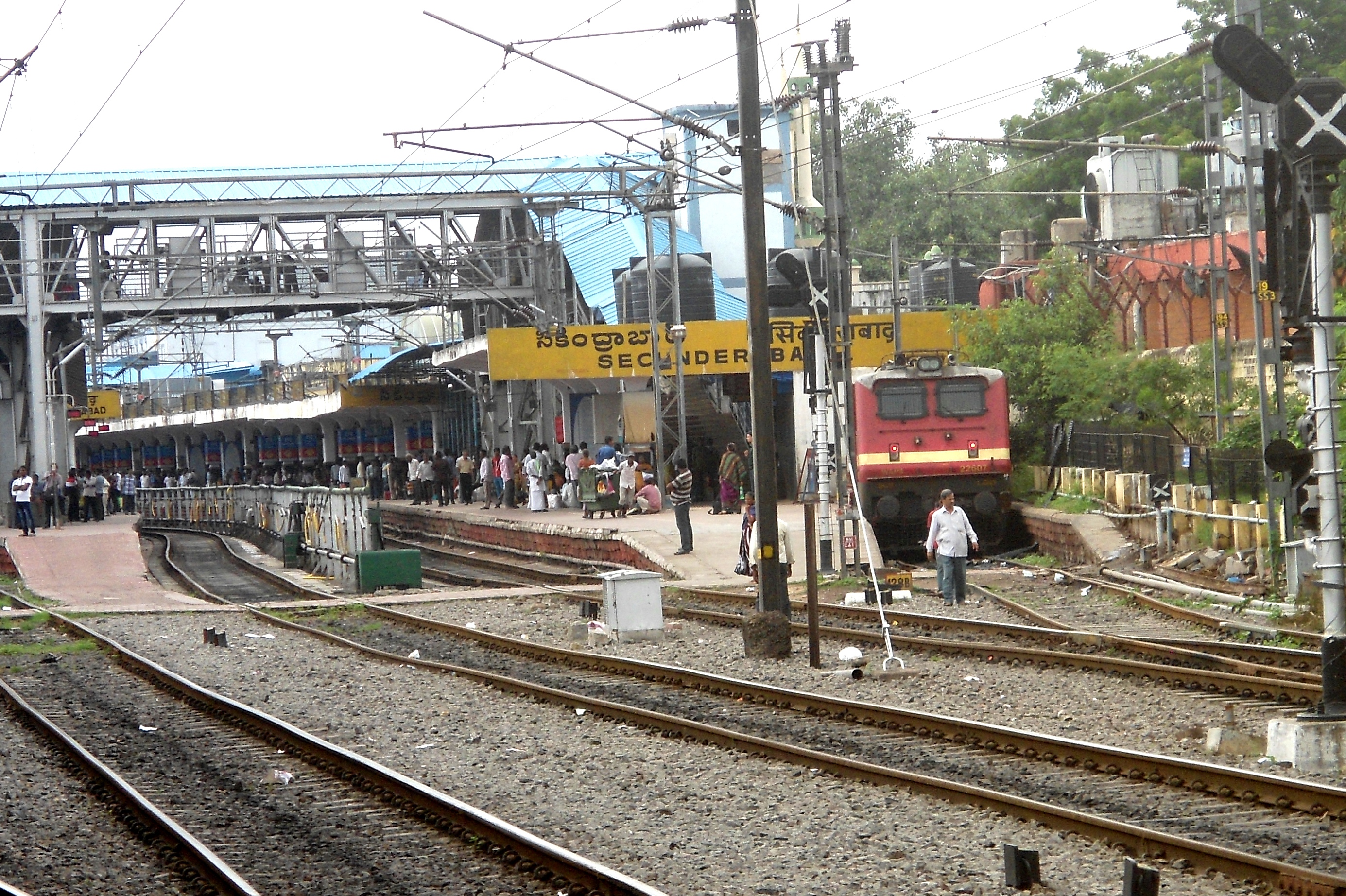
Platform No. 1

The station is serviced by an average of 229 Inter-city and suburban rail trains daily. Most trains originate or terminate at Secunderabad. The Vijayawada–Wadi line, which passes through the station, is one of SCR's busiest lines. It is also an IR freight station. Its Freight Operation Information System monitors freight movement.

Secunderabad is served by a number of lines:

- Secunderabad–Repalle
- Secunderabad–Nizamabad line (the Kacheguda–Manmad section)
- Vijayawada–Wadi line

=== Inter-city ===
It is one of Indian Railways' busiest stations. About 170,000 passengers use Secunderabad daily on over 200 trains. The Secunderabad Rajdhani Express, between Secunderabad and the Hazrat Nizamuddin railway station, was introduced on 27 February 2002. Another daily Rajdhani Express, originating at the Bangalore City railway station, also stops at Secunderabad. Several Garib Rath Express trains stop at the station, including the daily Visakhapatnam–Secunderabad Garib Rath Express and a train to Yeswanthpur in Bangalore. The non-stop Duronto Express was introduced between Secunderabad and Hazrat Nizamuddin.

All inter-city rail service is operated by Indian Railways. The bi-weekly Secunderabad–Mumbai Duronto Express, announced in the 2010–11 Union Railway Budget, was expected to begin by 31 March 2011. Most inter-city service operate to Vijayawada Junction, Guntur Junction, Tenali, Visakhapatnam, New Delhi, Howrah station, Chennai Central and Bangalore. The greatest passenger volume is between Secunderabad and Visakhapatnam. The Hyderabad–Visakhapatnam Godavari Express and Gowthami Express are SCR's most prestigious trains.

=== Commuter rail ===
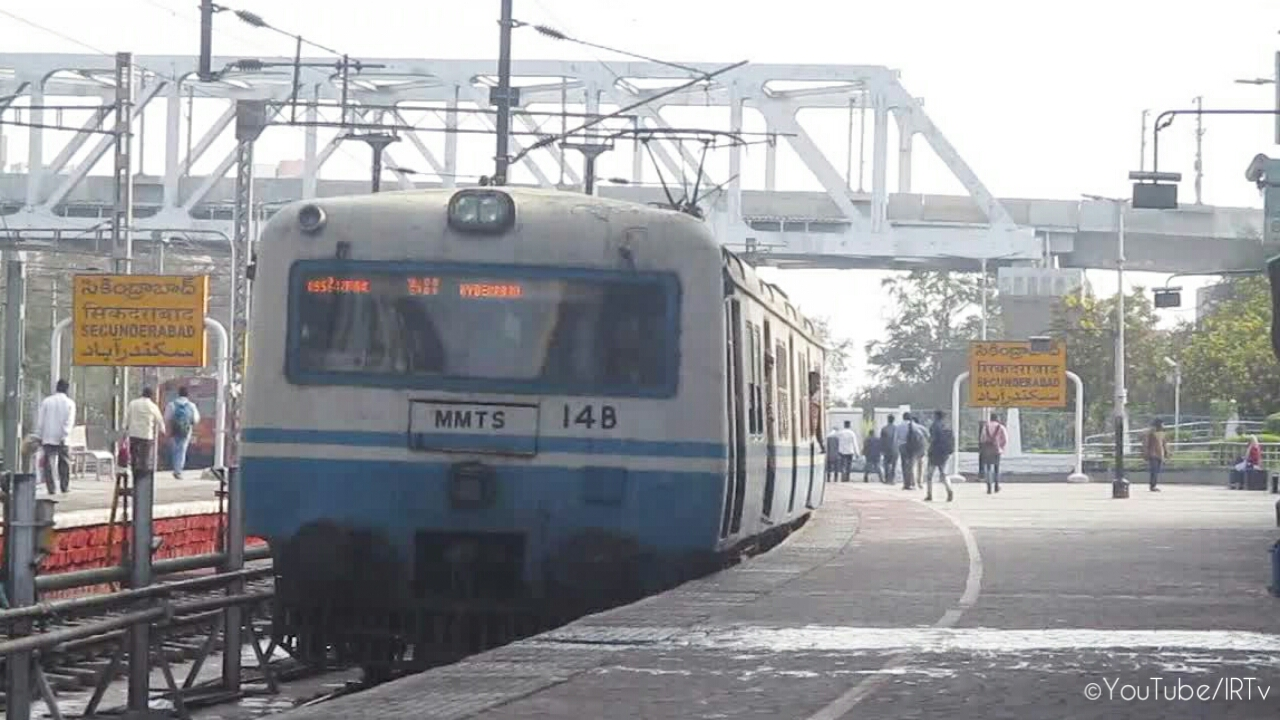
MMTS train Arriving It platform 10

Secunderabad is the only station in the Hyderabad MMTS to connect to all four MMTS commuter lines, and is the system's commuter inter-change hub. The station is on Lines 2 and 3 of the Hyderabad Metro. Secunderabad East metro station, on the blue line, is near Secunderabad Junction.

Secunderabad station is also the hub of suburban transit trains (push-pull trains). These DHMU's run in the non-electrified rail lines in the suburbs of the Hyderabad Urban Area. These also run in the electrified lines of MMTS).

The following Hyderabad MMTS lines originate at (or pass through) Secunderabad:

- Hyderabad–Falaknuma route (FN line)
- Secunderabad–Falaknuma route (FS line)
- Secunderabad–Bolarum route (BS line)

== Facilities ==
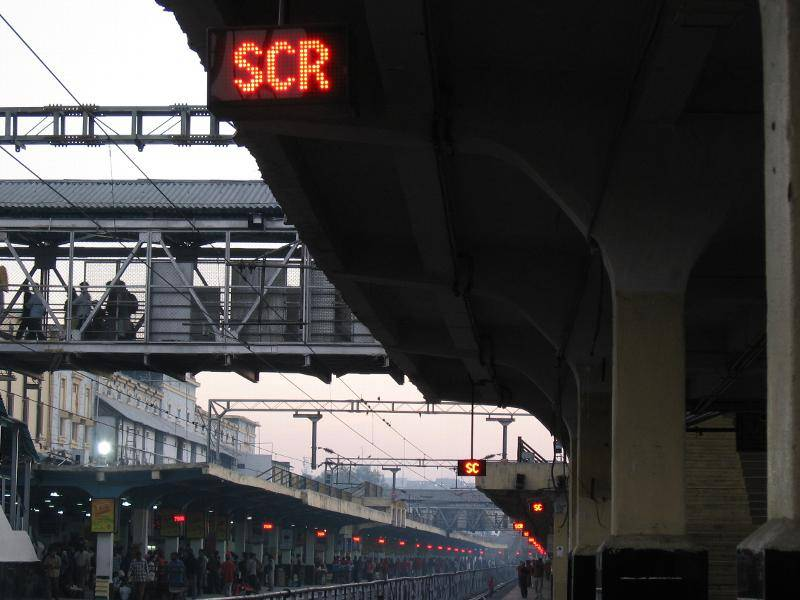
Platform with a pedestrian overpass in the background

Secunderabad has a number of passenger facilities, including modern security and parking. A coach depot for cleaning and maintenance is next to the station. The area around the station is sometimes congested. The station has restaurants, cafes, a coffee shop, book stalls, waiting and cloak rooms, a cyber cafe, tourism agents' and train-inquiry counters, digital train-status boards, train-status announcements and foot bridges. A pharmacy has a dispensary and first-aid kit.

Three waiting rooms are at the station's north entrance, and two are at the south entrance. An air-conditioned waiting room is on platform 1, and a non-air-conditioned dormitory is on the first floor. The air-conditioned waiting room is free of charge for passengers with air-conditioned-class tickets. The latest dormitory would supplement the existing air-conditioned dormitory with eight beds and 13 rooms, each with two beds.

Both south-entrance waiting rooms, on platform 10, are air-conditioned. Intended for upper- and second-class passengers, they have comfortable chairs and pay toilets. Nearly 11,000 passengers use the waiting rooms daily.

RPF personnel maintain security and monitor suspicious activity, surveillance cameras were installed at the station after the 13 September 2008 Delhi bombings. Indian Railways plan to equip a commando outfit modeled on the National Security Guard to counter terrorism at the station.

After increasing terrorist threats, SCR began baggage checks at an estimated cost of ₹ 40 lakh (₹ 4 million, or US$65,000) as part of a pilot project. To increase security, railway authorities introduced an integrated security system as part of the 2009 Rail Budget.

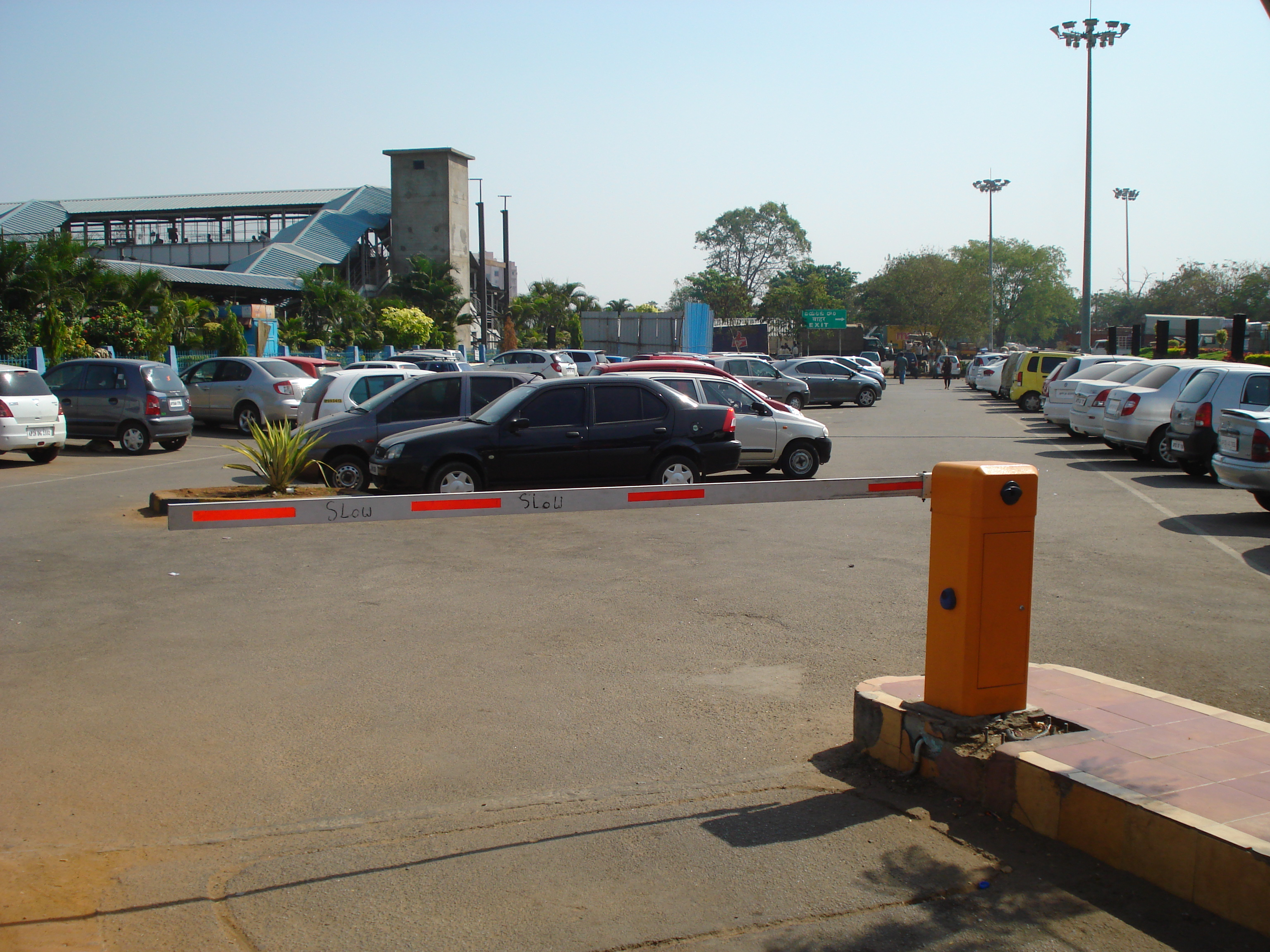
Automated parking lot

The station has a large car and motorcycle parking lot, and an auto rickshaw stand is at the station entrance. The south entrance has a taxi stand for municipal and private taxis. Secunderabad is India's first railway station with an automated parking system. The lot, built at a cost of ₹ 6 million, has a dispenser at its entrance to issue a magnetically striped ticket with the time and date of arrival. A manual pay station is at the exit.

Secunderabad Junction has two ticket counters. Passengers can buy second- and general-class tickets on the train, since they are not reservable. A computerised reservation facility is provided, and an information counter for tourists. A Passenger Operated Enquiry Terminal (POET) is available, which can access the National Train Enquiry System (NTES). Indrail Passes are available at the reservation center, about 200 meters from the station.

To conserve water, SCR installed a ₹ 12-million water-reclamation plant at the station. Station maintenance, including cleaning 800 coaches, aprons and platforms, requires over 30,000 litres of water daily. With the water-recycling plant, used water is collected and sent to the plant for biological and chemical treatment. The non-drinkable, recycled water is then used to clean coaches and platforms.

== Modernisation of the railway station ==
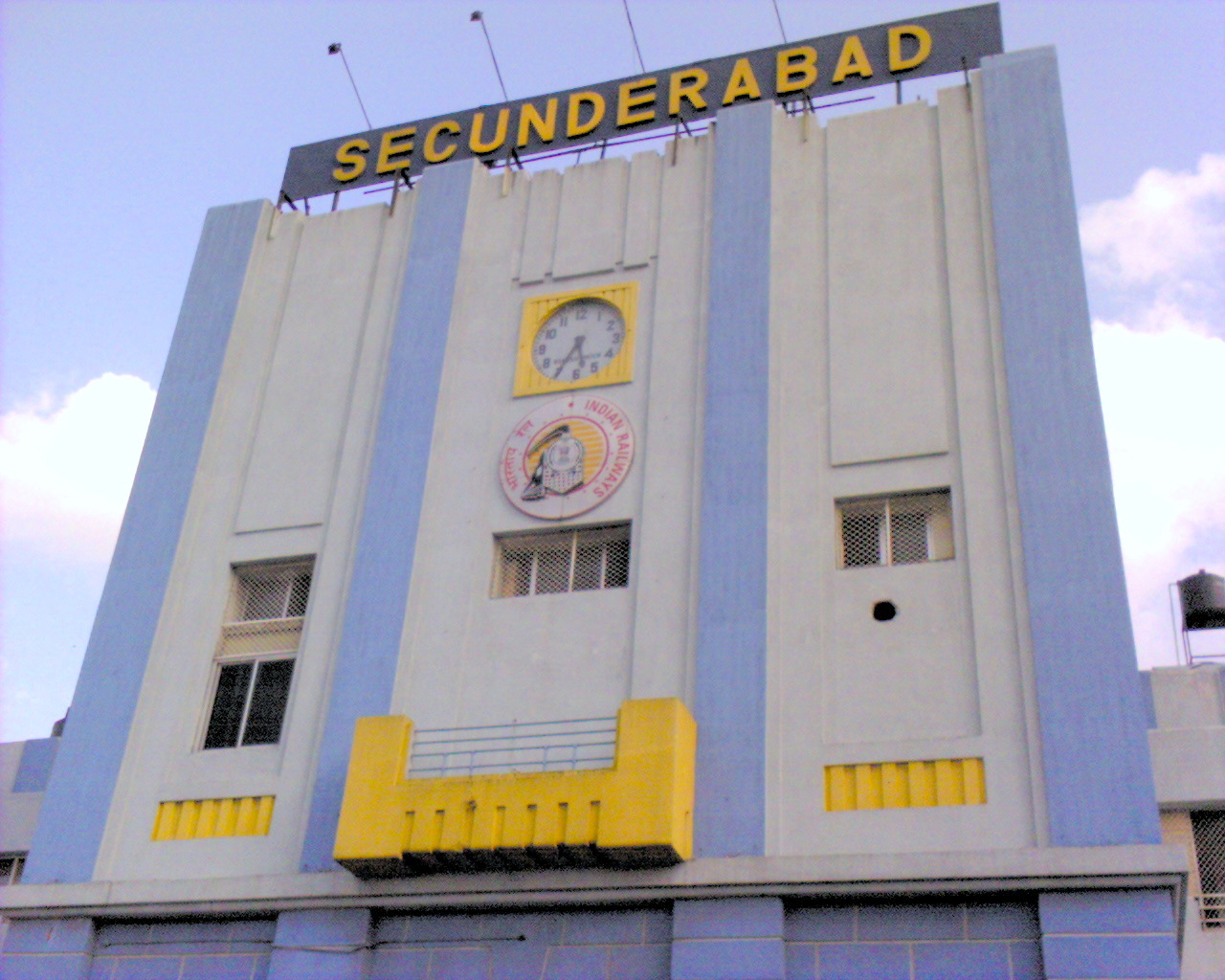
The station's main entrance

=== 2008–2014 ===
During the 2008–09 Indian Railways budget session, Railway Minister Lalu Prasad Yadav unveiled a design to improve the two-century-old Secunderabad Junction station at an estimated cost of ₹ 40 billion (est.$1 billion). In the 2009–10 budget hearing, Mamata Banerjee listed 50 stations (including Secunderabad) to upgrade to world-class facilities. According to the Rail Ministry, the upgrade would be similar to Roma Termini (Rome's central rail station). Chief Minister Y.S. Rajasekhara Reddy proposed developing the Gandhi Hospital land adjoining the station along the lines of Toronto's Union Station, which was developed into a major commuter terminus, a commercial hub and a parking facility.

Similar to an airport, the proposed station would have a shopping mall, a food plaza, entertainment and recreation centres. The plan includes vertical expansion of the station, with platforms on several floors connected by escalators and lifts. Separation of arriving and departing commuters and integration of the proposed integrated bus terminus (IBT) and metro service will be key ingredients of the upgrade. The station's current security apparatus might be overhauled. Lighting, seating areas, waiting rooms, bathrooms and Internet kiosks would be upgraded.

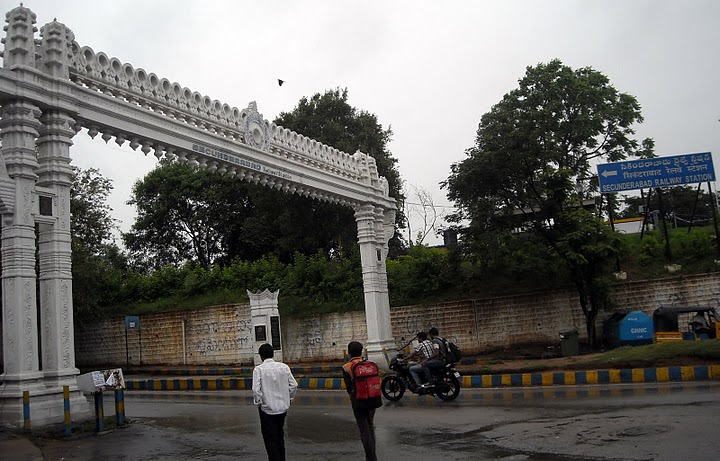
South side entrance

Since about 170,000 passengers commute through Secunderabad on 229 trains daily, the project needs to be developed with an eye to the next century; Union Railway Minister Mamata Banerjee concurred in June 2009, when she presented the maiden 2009–10 Rail Budget. Preservationists fear that the massive upgrade may leave the heritage building a memory of a bygone era, since ₹ 85 million has already been spent on station improvements.

A series of meetings was convened with Railway Board authorities in July 2009. It was decided to hire a consultant to sketch a master plan for the project, including facilities to be incorporated, a time frame and estimated cost. Global tenders for consultants were issued on 26 September, and the successful bidder (who would have ten months to propose a master plan) would be selected on 30 October. The request for tender deadline was extended to 24 December and then indefinitely, due to a lack of bidders.

=== 2014–2025 ===
The Secunderabad railway station, a pivotal node in the Indian Railways network, is undergoing extensive modernisation as part of the Ministry of Railways' ambitious Amrit Bharat Station Scheme. This scheme, formulated on the back of the insights and recommendations from a high-level committee, aims to address the practical difficulties experienced with the Manual of Standards and Specifications for Railway Stations (MSSR 2009) issued in June 2009. The committee's mandate included reviewing and updating the MSSR 2009, devising measures for optimising the redevelopment costs of stations, and establishing norms for the scale of facilities to be provided at redeveloped stations.

Under the umbrella of the Indian Railways' Major Upgradation initiative, the redevelopment of Secunderabad Railway Station is one of the key projects identified. With a budget allocation of Rs. 720 crores, the project seeks to transform the station into an iconic structure that provides world-class amenities. The Prime Minister, Narendra Modi, laid the foundation stone for this monumental redevelopment on 8 April 2023, signifying the start of a project that aims to culminate by the end of 2025.

The redevelopment project boasts several salient features aimed at enhancing the travel experience:

- Iconic Station Building: Designed with a future horizon of 40–60 years, the station will serve as a landmark with its aesthetic and functional design.
- Future-Proof Facilities: The project plans for an extended horizon, ensuring facilities are in place to manage a peak hour traffic of 25,000 passengers and accommodate surges up to 325,000 passengers during special events like Melas.
- Expansion of Station Building Area: The proposed station building area is significantly expanded to 61,912 sqm from the existing 11,427 sqm, facilitating a broader range of services and amenities.
- Spacious Roof Plaza/Concourse: Measuring 108m x 120m, this double-level area will host all passenger amenities, alongside retail spaces, cafeterias, and recreational facilities, effectively connecting both sides of the station and all platforms.
- Integration and Accessibility: Ensuring seamless integration of both city sides and improved accessibility with 26 lifts, 2 travelators, and 32 escalators.
- Enhanced Passenger Experience: The project focuses on segregating arriving and departing passengers, decluttering platforms, and providing comprehensive facilities for the disabled.
- Direct Connectivity: Enhancements include direct connectivity to the East & West Metro Stations and Rathifile Bus Station, fostering an integrated transport hub.
- Multilevel Car Parking and Segregation: To further streamline the passenger experience, the project introduces multilevel car parking at the North Terminal. This feature, along with the strategic segregation of arriving and departing passengers, optimises flow and convenience.
- Sustainability and Safety: The station will feature certified green buildings, solar energy utilisation, water conservation/recycling, comprehensive CCTV coverage, and access control for enhanced safety.

=== Present ===
Aerial view of the station showing recent development activity

  - Secunderabad Railway Station is going through a large-scale redevelopment as part of the Amrit Bharat Station Scheme to transform it into a modern, world-class transit hub. The work includes new station buildings, concourses, improved connectivity, and passenger amenities.
  - The project cost is around ₹714–720 crore and is expected to be completed by late 2026.
  - Nearly about 65% of the redevelopment work has been completed as of mid 2026. Key infrastructure being built includes:
    - multi-level & underground parking
    - Two-storied modern air concourse
    - foot overbridges and travelators
    - improved electrical substations
    - enhanced passenger drop-off zones.
    - State-of-the-art security systems
  - Secunderabad Junction is one of the busiest railway stations in South Central Railway, catering to over 1.5 lakh passengers daily with around 180 trains.

== See also ==
- Nizam's Guaranteed State Railway
- South Central Railway zone
- Transport in Hyderabad
- Hyderabad Deccan railway station
- Begumpet railway station
- Amrit Bharat Station Scheme
