= Yusufguda metro station =

Metro station in Hyderabad, India

Yusufguda

General information
- Location: A-91, Krishna Nagar Main Rd, Lakshmi Narasimha Nagar, Krishna Nagar, Yousufguda, Hyderabad, Telangana 500054.
- Coordinates: 17°26′06″N 78°25′35″E
- System: Hyderabad Metro station
- Line: Blue Line
- Platforms: 2 (2 side platforms)
- Tracks: 2

Construction
- Structure type: Elevated
- Platform levels: 1

History
- Opened: 20 March 2019; 7 years ago

Services
| Preceding station | Hyderabad Metro | Following station |
|---|---|---|
| Road No 5 Jubilee Hills towards Raidurg | Blue Line | Taruni Madhura Nagar towards Nagole |
Location
- Location within Hyderabad

Yusufguda Metro Station is located on the Blue Line of the Hyderabad Metro, India. It is near to Krishna kanth Park, Kotla Vijaya bhaskar Stadium, Pochamma Temple, Krishna Hospital, Vidyaniketan High Schoolm and Lakshmi Narasimha Nagar road.

== History ==
The work started in 2015. The deadline of completion was delayed due to multiple issues.

In September 2017, Alpha-numeric numbers were given to Metro Rail pillars to link them with the Google map for citizens and tourists to identify different locations of the Metro Rail network.

In November 2017, Telangana State Power Transmission Corporation planned to start supplying uninterrupted power to metro rail network from four dedicated 132 KV receiving substations (RSS) at Uppal and Miyapur metro depots, Yousufguda and MGBS.

On 27 September 2018, The Chief Electrical Inspector (CEIG) for Hyderabad Metro Rail accorded sanction for energisation. The Yousufguda 132 kV /33 kV /25 kV Metro RSS was the fourth and the last RSS that was energised.

In November 2018, on the occasion of the first anniversary of the L&T Metro train operations, the trial run of the Metro train between Ameerpet and Hi-tec City (Corridor III) began.

On 20 March 2019, the station was opened and Governor E.S.L. Narasimhan flagged off Metro train services on Ameerpet-Hitec City stretch (10 km) of Corridor-III (Nagole-Ameerpet-Hitec City).

In August 2019, Hyderabad Metro Rail Limited announced that the average train frequency on the busy route from Nagole to Hitec City will be increased to 4 minutes during peak hours which was previously about 7 to 15 minutes.

In 2020, due to COVID-19 restrictions the platform was closed.

== The station ==
=== Structure ===
Yusufguda elevated metro station is situated on the Blue Line of Hyderabad Metro, which runs from Nagole to Rayadurg. It was opened on 29 November 2017.

=== Facilities ===
The stations have staircases, elevators and escalators from the street level to the platform level which provide easy and comfortable access. Also, operation panels inside the elevators are installed at a level that can be conveniently operated by all passengers, including disabled and elderly citizens. Two wheeler paid parking is available at Entry Gate C.

=== Station layout ===
Street Level
This is the first level where passengers may park their vehicles and view the local area map.

Concourse level
Ticketing office or Ticket Vending Machines (TVMs) is located here. Retail outlets and other facilities like washrooms, ATMs, first aid, etc., will be available in this area.

Platform level
This layer consists of two platforms. Trains takes passengers from this level.

| L1; Platforms | Side platform, doors will open on the left |
| L1; Platforms | Platform 2 | Blue Line toward Nagole (Taruni Madhura Nagar) → |
| L1; Platforms | Platform 1 | ← Blue Line toward Raidurg (Road No 5 Jubilee Hills) |
| L1; Platforms | Side platform, doors will open on the left |
| M | Mezzanine | Fare control, station agent, Metro Card vending machines, crossover |
| G | Street level | Exit/Entrance |

== See also ==
- Hyderabad
- Transport in Hyderabad
- List of rapid transit systems
- List of metro systems
