= Madhapur metro station =

Metro station in Hyderabad, India

Madhapur
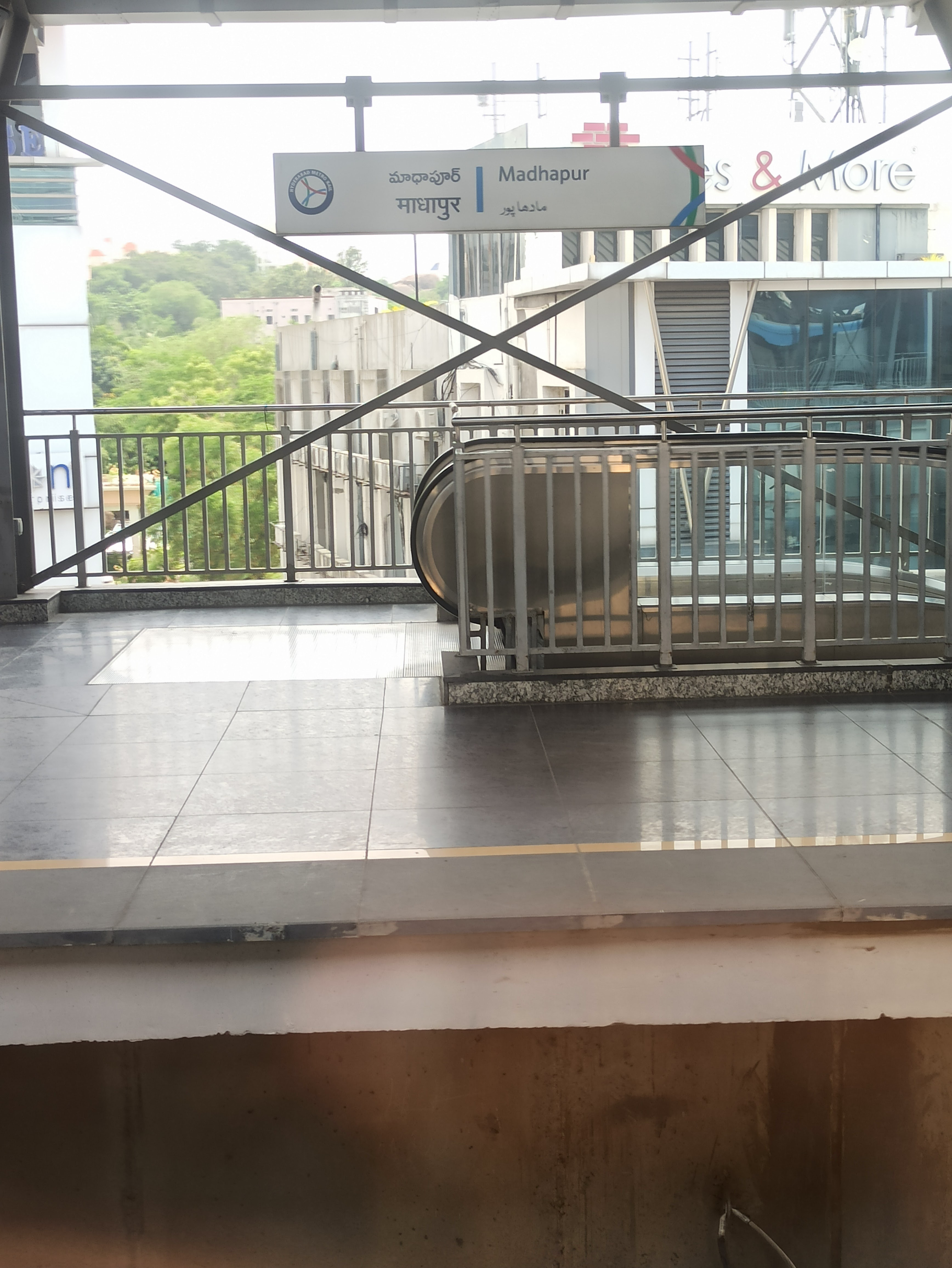

General information
- Location: Rd Number 36, Aditya Enclave, Venkatagiri, Madhapur, Hyderabad, Telangana - 500033
- Coordinates: 17.4372°N 78.3982°E
- System: Hyderabad Metro station
- Owner: Larsen & Toubro (90%); Government of Telangana (10%)
- Operator: Hyderabad Metro Rail Ltd.
- Line: Blue Line
- Platforms: 2 (2 side platform)
- Tracks: 2

Construction
- Structure type: Elevated, Double track
- Parking: Available
- Accessible: Yes

History
- Opened: 13 April 2019; 7 years ago

Services
Preceding station	Hyderabad Metro	Following station
Durgam Cheruvu towards Raidurg	Blue Line	Peddamma Gudi towards Nagole
Location
- Location within Hyderabad

Madhapur Metro Station is located on the Blue Line of the Hyderabad Metro India.

== History ==
It was opened on 13 April 2019.

== The station ==
=== Structure ===
Madhapur elevated metro station situated on the Blue Line of Hyderabad Metro.

=== Facilities ===
The stations have staircases, elevators and escalators.

=== Station layout ===
Street Level
This is the first level where passengers may park their vehicles and view the local area map.

Concourse level
Ticketing office or Ticket Vending Machines (TVMs) is located here. Retail outlets and other facilities like washrooms, ATMs, first aid, etc., will be available in this area.

Platform level
This layer consists of two platforms. Trains takes passengers from this level.

L1; Platforms	Side platform, doors will open on the left
L1; Platforms	Platform 2	Blue Line toward Nagole (Peddamma Gudi) →
L1; Platforms	Platform 1	← Blue Line toward Raidurg (Durgam Cheruvu)
L1; Platforms	Side platform, doors will open on the left
M	Mezzanine	Fare control, station agent, Metro Card vending machines, crossover
G	Street level	Exit/Entrance

== Entrances and exits ==
Mezzanine (M)

- A -
- B - Aditya Enclave
- C - Jubilee hills road nos. 38, 39
- D -

== See also ==
- Hyderabad
- Transport in Hyderabad
- List of rapid transit systems
- List of metro systems
