= Rasoolpura metro station =

Metro station in Hyderabad, India

Rasoolpura
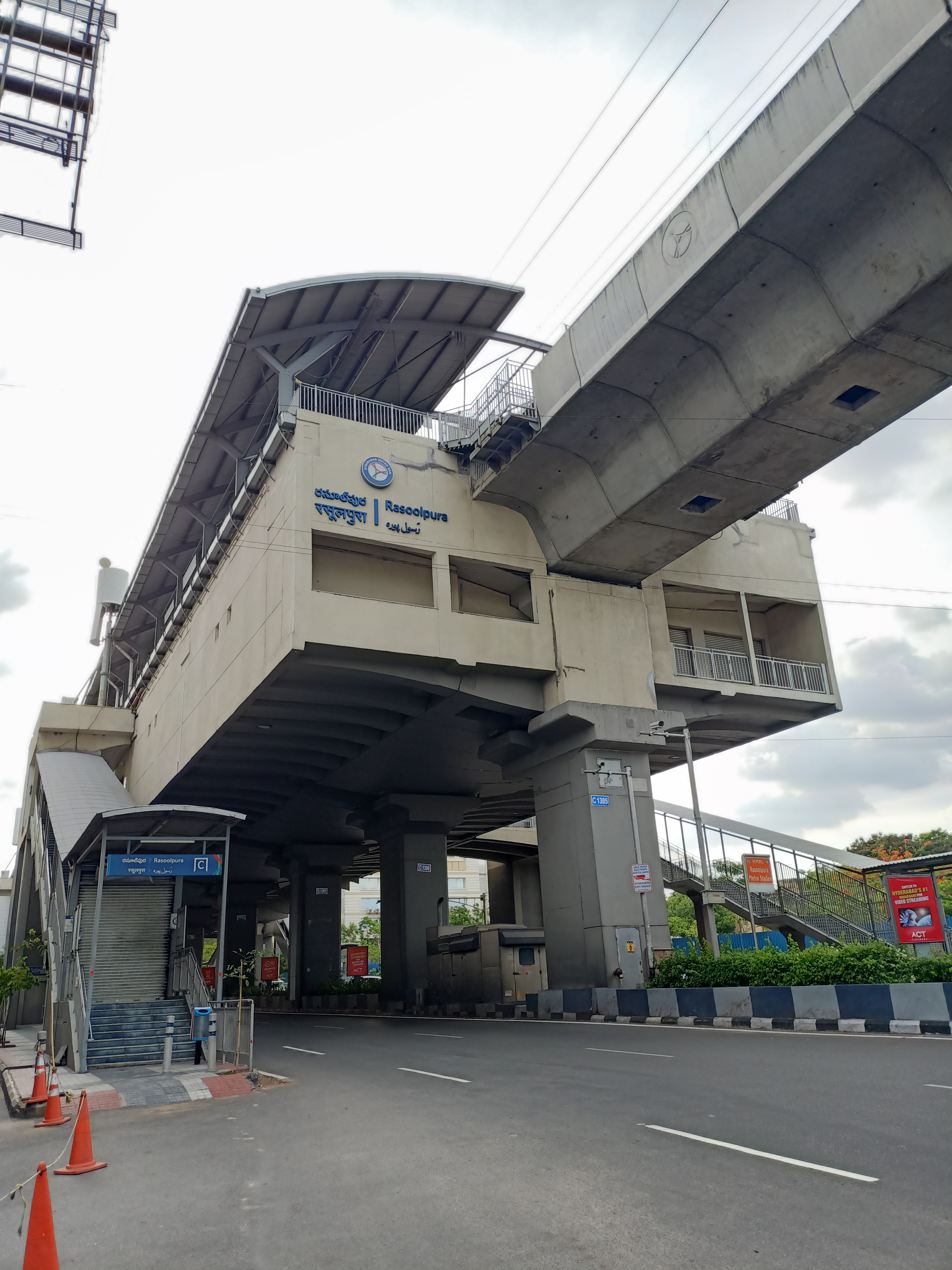
- Rasoolpura metro station as seen from C-gate entrance

General information
- Location: Begumpet Police Lines, Sardar Patel Main Road, Opp Splendid Towers, Begumpet, Secunderabad−500016
- Coordinates: 17°26′36″N 78°28′33″E
- System: Hyderabad Metro station
- Owner: Larsen & Toubro (90%); Government of Telangana (10%)
- Operator: Hyderabad Metro Rail Ltd.
- Line: Blue Line
- Platforms: 2 (2 side platform)
- Tracks: 2

Construction
- Structure type: Elevated, Double track

History
- Opened: 29 November 2017; 8 years ago

Services
Preceding station	Hyderabad Metro	Following station
Prakash Nagar towards Raidurg	Blue Line	Paradise towards Nagole
Track layout
Location
- Location within Hyderabad Location within Telangana

Rasoolpura metro station is located on the Blue Line of the Hyderabad Metro in India. It is near to Hyderabad Metro Rail Bhavan, Begumpet Traffic Police station, Minister's Road, US Visa Office, Begumpet Hockey stadium, Police Lines road and Citibank.

== History ==
It was opened on 29 November 2017.

== The station ==
=== Structure ===
Rasoolpura elevated metro station situated on the Blue Line of Hyderabad Metro.

=== Facilities ===
The stations have staircases, elevators and escalators from the street level to the platform level which provide easy and comfortable access. Also, operation panels inside the elevators are installed at a level that can be conveniently operated by all passengers, including disabled and elderly citizens.

=== Station layout ===
Street Level
This is the first level where passengers may park their vehicles and view the local area map.

Concourse level
Ticketing office or Ticket Vending Machines (TVMs) is located here. Retail outlets and other facilities like washrooms, ATMs, first aid, etc., will be available in this area.

Platform level
This layer consists of two platforms. Trains takes passengers from this level.

L1; Platforms	Side platform, doors will open on the left
L1; Platforms	Platform 2	Blue Line toward Nagole (Paradise) →
L1; Platforms	Platform 1	← Blue Line toward Raidurg (Invesco Prakash Nagar)
L1; Platforms	Side platform, doors will open on the left
M	Mezzanine	Fare control, station agent, Metro Card vending machines, crossover
G	Street level	Exit/Entrance

== Entrances and exits ==
Mezzanine (M)

- A - HMR Bhavan
- B - Begumpet Traffic Police Station
- C - Minister Road
- D - Visa Office

== See also ==
- Hyderabad
- Transport in Hyderabad
- List of rapid transit systems
- List of metro systems
