= Paradise metro station =

Metro station in Hyderabad, India

Paradise
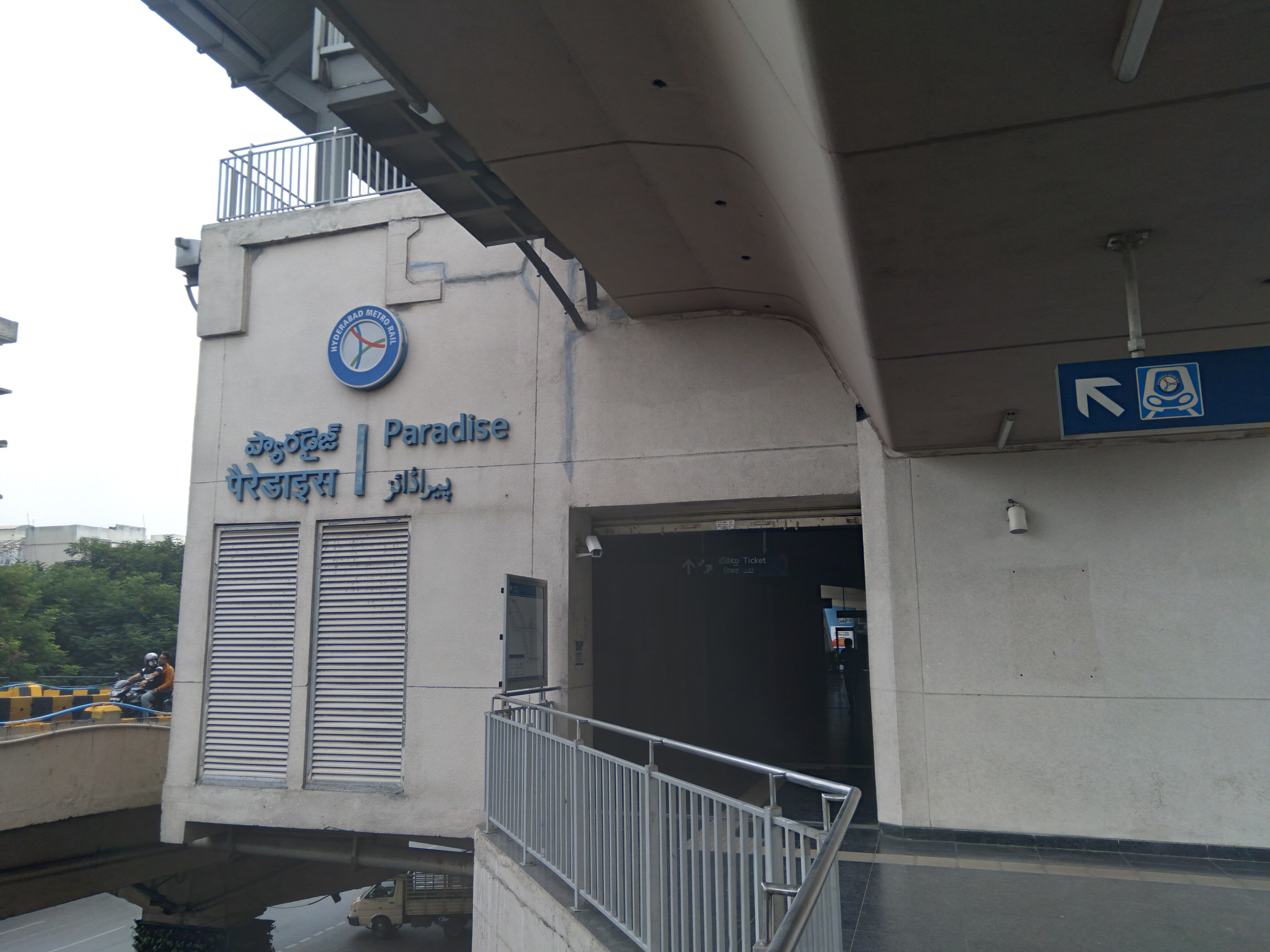

General information
- Location: S.P Road Secunderabad Opp Fire Station, Secunderabad, Telangana 500003
- Coordinates: 17.4435274°N 78.4850961°E
- System: Hyderabad Metro station
- Line: Blue Line
- Tracks: 2

Construction
- Structure type: Elevated
- Platform levels: 2

History
- Opened: 29 November 2017; 8 years ago

Services
Preceding station	Hyderabad Metro	Following station
Rasoolpura towards Raidurg	Blue Line	Parade Ground towards Nagole
Location
- Location within Telangana

Paradise metro station is located on the Blue Line of the Hyderabad Metro India. It is near the Osmania University PG College, Gymkhana Cricket ground, Paradise Fire station, Yatri Nivas, Paradise Restaurant, BSNL Office and Sunshine Hospital.

== History ==
It was opened on 29 November 2017. In 2018, Paradise Metro stations was awarded the Indian Green Building Council's (IGBC) Green MRTS Platinum Award.

== The station ==
=== Structure ===
Paradise elevated metro station situated on the Blue Line of Hyderabad Metro.

=== Facilities ===
The stations have staircases, elevators and escalators from the street level to the platform level which provide easy and comfortable access. Also, operation panels inside the elevators are installed at a level that can be conveniently operated by all passengers, including disabled and elderly citizens.

=== Station layout ===
Street Level
This is the first level where passengers may park their vehicles and view the local area map.

Concourse level
Ticketing office or Ticket Vending Machines (TVMs) is located here. Retail outlets and other facilities like washrooms, ATMs, first aid, etc., will be available in this area.

Platform level
This layer consists of two platforms. Trains takes passengers from this level.

G	Street level	Exit/Entrance
L1	Mezzanine	Fare control, station agent, Metro Card vending machines, crossover
L2	Side platform No- 1, doors will open on the left
L2	Southbound	Towards →Raidurg→ →
L2	Northbound	→Towards ← Nagole← ←
L2	Side platform No- 2, doors will open on the left
L2

== See also ==
- Hyderabad
- Transport in Hyderabad
- List of rapid transit systems
- List of metro systems
