= Prakash Nagar metro station =

Metro station in Hyderabad, India

Invesco Prakash Nagar
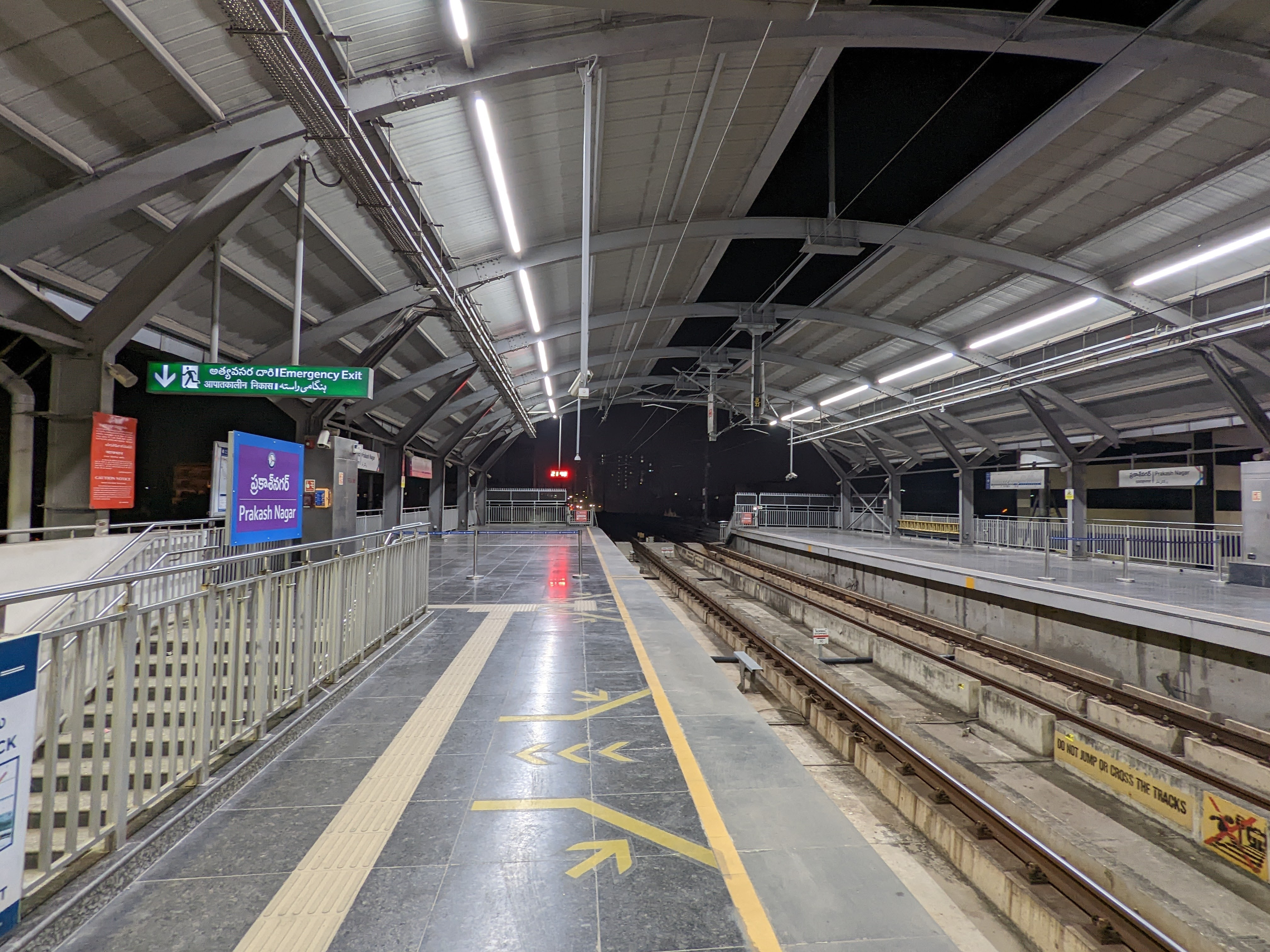
- Platform level of Prakash Nagar metro station

General information
- Location: Near Shoppers Stop, Alladin Mansion, Begumpet, Secunderabad-500016
- Coordinates: 17.4448°N 78.4652°E
- System: Hyderabad Metro station
- Owner: Larsen & Toubro (90%); Government of Telangana (10%)
- Operator: Hyderabad Metro Rail Ltd.
- Line: Blue Line
- Platforms: 2 (2 side platforms)
- Tracks: 2

Construction
- Structure type: Elevated, Double track

History
- Opened: 29 November 2017; 8 years ago

Services
Preceding station	Hyderabad Metro	Following station
Begumpet towards Raidurg	Blue Line	Rasoolpura towards Nagole
Location
- Location within Hyderabad

Prakash Nagar (also known as Invesco Prakash Nagar) is a metro station that is located on the Blue Line of the Hyderabad Metro, in India. It is near to Shopper's stop, Indian Oil Petrol Bunk, Chikoti Garden, HDFC Bank, Columbus Hospital and Pace Hospital.

== History ==
It was opened on 29 November 2017.

== The station ==
=== Structure ===
Prakash Nagar elevated metro station is situated on the Blue Line of Hyderabad Metro.

=== Facilities ===
The stations have staircases, elevators and escalators from the street level to the platform level which provide easy and comfortable access. Also, operation panels inside the elevators are installed at a level that can be conveniently operated by all passengers, including disabled and elderly citizens.

=== Station layout ===
Street Level
This is the first level where passengers may park their vehicles and view the local area map.

Concourse level
Ticketing office or Ticket Vending Machines (TVMs) is located here. Retail outlets and other facilities like washrooms, ATMs, first aid, etc., will be available in this area.

Platform level
This layer consists of two platforms. Trains takes passengers from this level.

L2; Platforms	Side platform, doors will open on the left
L2; Platforms	Platform 2	Blue Line toward Nagole (Rasoolpura) →
L2; Platforms	Platform 1	← Blue Line toward Raidurg (Begumpet)
L2; Platforms	Side platform, doors will open on the left
L1	Mezzanine	Fare control, station agent, Metro Card vending machines, crossover
G	Street level	Exit/Entrance

== Entrances and exits ==
Mezzanine (M)

- A - Shoppers Stop
- B - Indian Oil Petrol Pump
- C - Chikoti Garden
- D - HDFC Bank / Columbus Hospital

== See also ==
- Hyderabad
- Transport in Hyderabad
- List of rapid transit systems
- List of metro systems
