= Begumpet metro station =

Metro station in Hyderabad, India

Begumpet
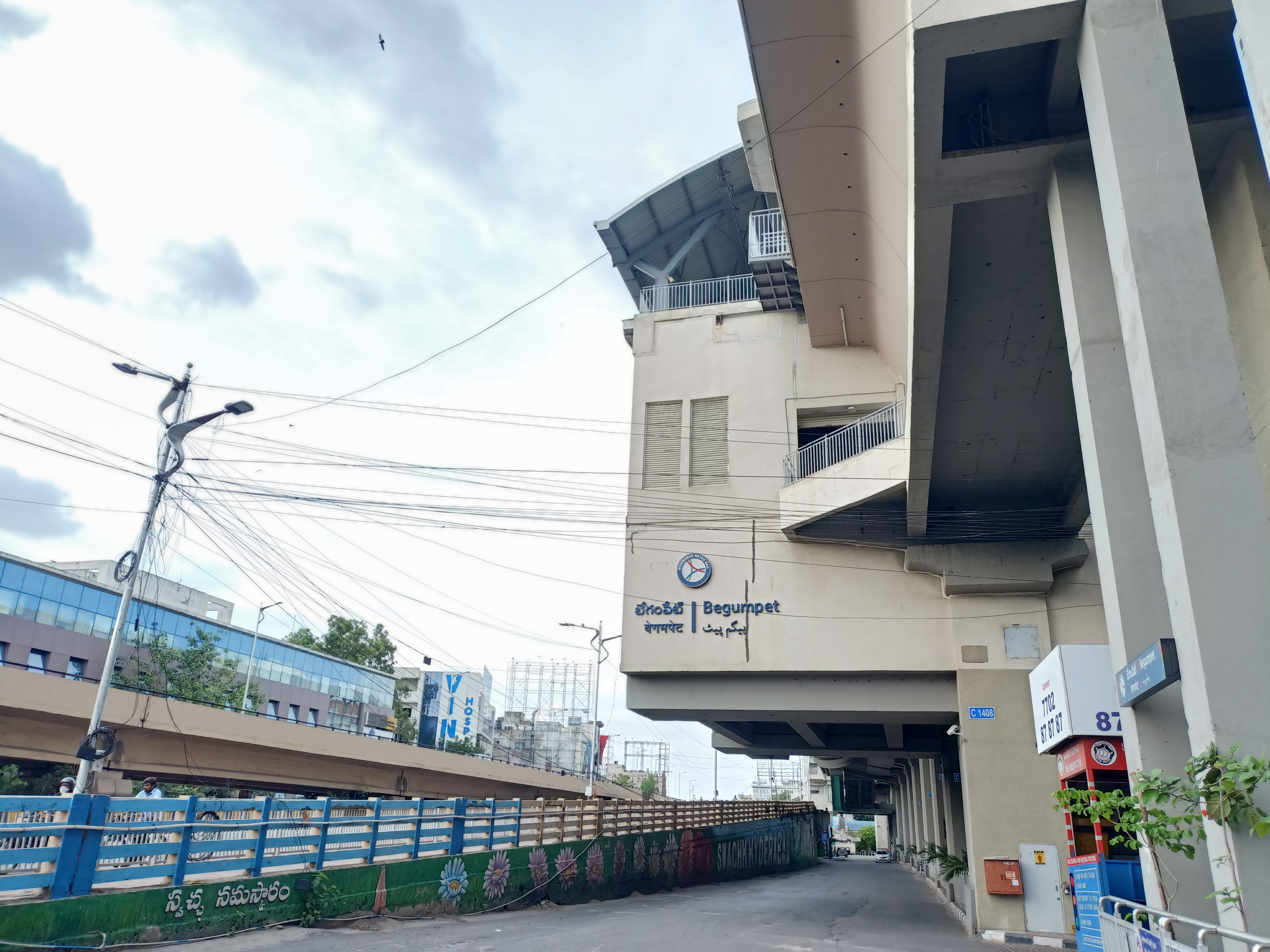

General information
- Location: Near Lifestyle Building, Kundanbagh Colony, Begumpet, Hyderabad—500016.
- Coordinates: 17°26′15″N 78°27′24″E
- System: Hyderabad Metro station
- Line: Blue Line
- Platforms: 2 (2 side platforms)
- Tracks: 2
- Connections: Begumpet

Construction
- Structure type: Elevated, Double track

History
- Opened: 29 November 2017; 8 years ago

Services
Preceding station	Hyderabad Metro	Following station
Ameerpet towards Raidurg	Blue Line	Prakash Nagar towards Nagole
Location
- Location within Hyderabad Location within Telangana Location within India

Begumpet (also known as SBI Begumpet Metro Station) Metro Station is located on the Blue Line of the Hyderabad Metro in India. It is near to Begumpet railway station, Kundan Bagh, Country Club, Life style, Meena Bazaar Ext, Green park Hotel and Green lands road.

== History ==
It was opened on 29 November 2017.

== The station ==
=== Structure ===
Begumpet elevated metro station is situated on the Blue Line of Hyderabad Metro.

=== Facilities ===
The stations have staircases, elevators and escalators from the street level to the platform level which provide easy and comfortable access. Also, operation panels inside the elevators are installed at a level that can be conveniently operated by all passengers, including disabled and elderly citizens.

=== Station layout ===
Street Level
This is the first level where passengers may park their vehicles and view the local area map.

Concourse level
Ticketing office or Ticket Vending Machines (TVMs) is located here. Retail outlets and other facilities like washrooms, ATMs, first aid, etc., will be available in this area.

Platform level
This layer consists of two platforms. Trains takes passengers from this level.

L1; Platforms	Side platform, doors will open on the left
L1; Platforms	Platform 2	Blue Line toward Nagole (Invesco Prakash Nagar) →
L1; Platforms	Platform 1	← Blue Line toward Raidurg (Ameerpet) Change at the next station for Red Line
L1; Platforms	Side platform, doors will open on the left
M	Mezzanine	Fare control, station agent, Metro Card vending machines, crossover
G	Street level	Exit/Entrance

== Entrances/exits ==
- A: Begumpet Railway Station
- B: Kundan Bagh Road / Country Club

== See also ==
- Hyderabad
- Transport in Hyderabad
- List of rapid transit systems
- List of metro systems
