= JNTU College metro station =

Metro station in Hyderabad, India

JNTU College
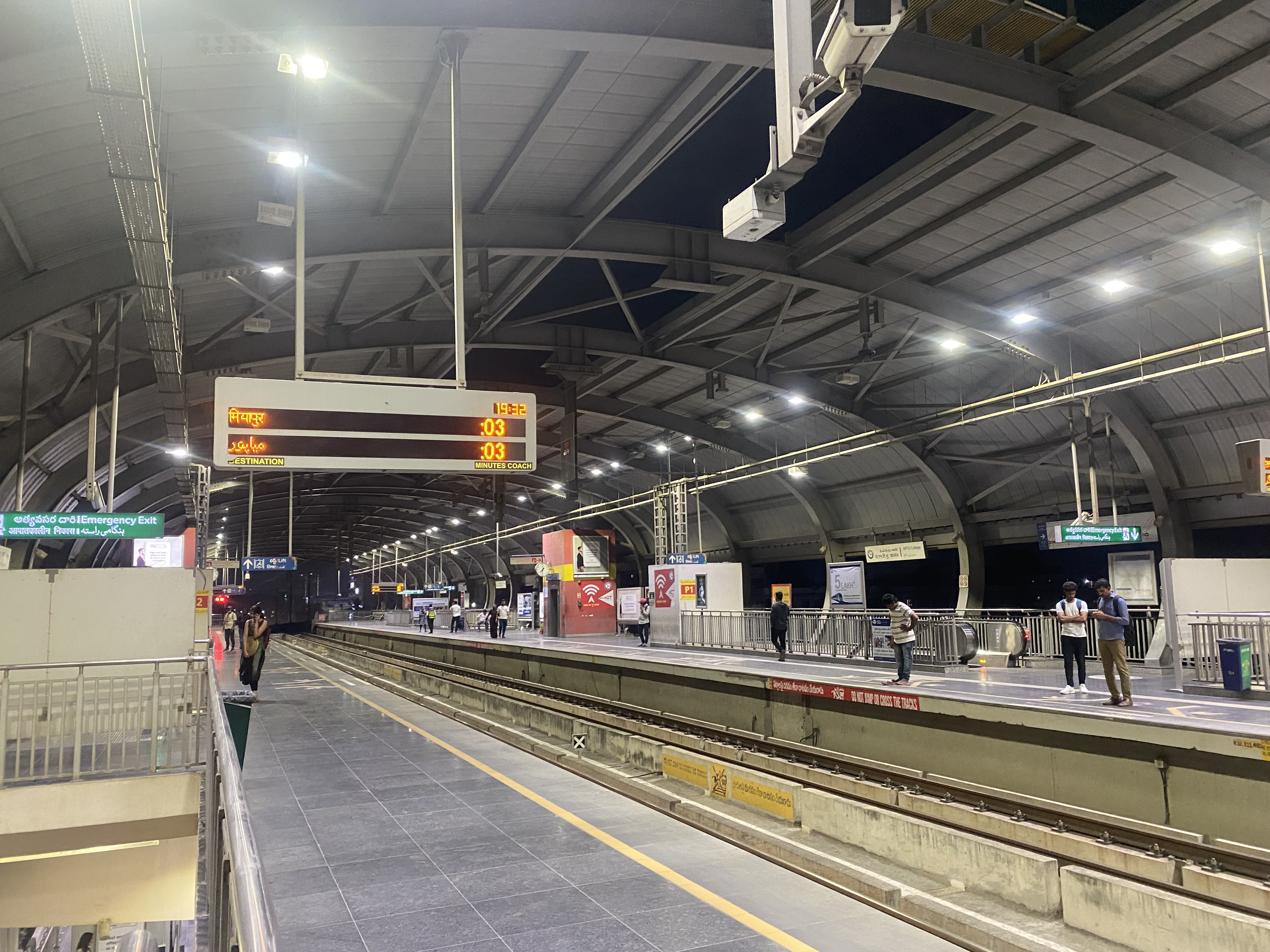
- Platform 2 of JNTU College metro station

General information
- Location: Near JNTU College, Hyderabad, Telangana 500072
- Coordinates: 17.498653°N 78.388793°E
- System: Hyderabad Metro station
- Line: Red Line
- Platforms: Side platform Platform-1 → Vasavi LB Nagar; Platform-2 → Miyapur
- Tracks: 2

Construction
- Structure type: Elevated, Double-track
- Platform levels: 2
- Parking: Available
- Cycle facilities: Available
- Accessible: Disabled access

Other information
- Status: Staffed, Operational

History
- Opened: 29 November 2017; 8 years ago

Services
Preceding station	Hyderabad Metro	Following station
Miyapur Terminus	Red Line	KPHB Colony towards LB Nagar
Route map
Location
- Location within Hyderabad

The JNTU College Metro Station is located on the Red Line of the Hyderabad Metro in India. This station was opened to the public in 2017. It is located near JNTU College.

== History ==
It was opened on 29 November 2017.

== The station ==
=== Structure ===
JNTU College elevated metro station situated on the Red Line of Hyderabad Metro.

=== Facilities ===
The stations have staircases, elevators and escalators from the street level to the platform level which provide easy and comfortable access. Also, operation panels inside the elevators are installed at a level that can be conveniently operated by all passengers, including disabled and elderly citizens.

=== Station layout ===
Street Level
This is the first level where passengers may park their vehicles and view the local area map.

Concourse level
Ticketing office or Ticket Vending Machines (TVMs) is located here. Retail outlets and other facilities like washrooms, ATMs, first aid, etc., will be available in this area.

Platform level
This layer consists of two platforms. Trains takes passengers from this level.

G	Street level	Exit/Entrance
L1	Mezzanine	Fare control, station agent, Metro Card vending machines, crossover
L2	Side platform | Doors will open on the left
L2	Platform 1 Southbound	Towards → Vasavi LB Nagar next station is KPHB Colony
L2	Platform 2 Northbound	Towards ← Miyapur
L2	Side platform | Doors will open on the left
L2

== See also ==
- Hyderabad
- Transport in Hyderabad
- List of rapid transit systems
- List of metro systems
