= Durgam Cheruvu metro station =

Metro station in Hyderabad, India

Durgam Cheruvu
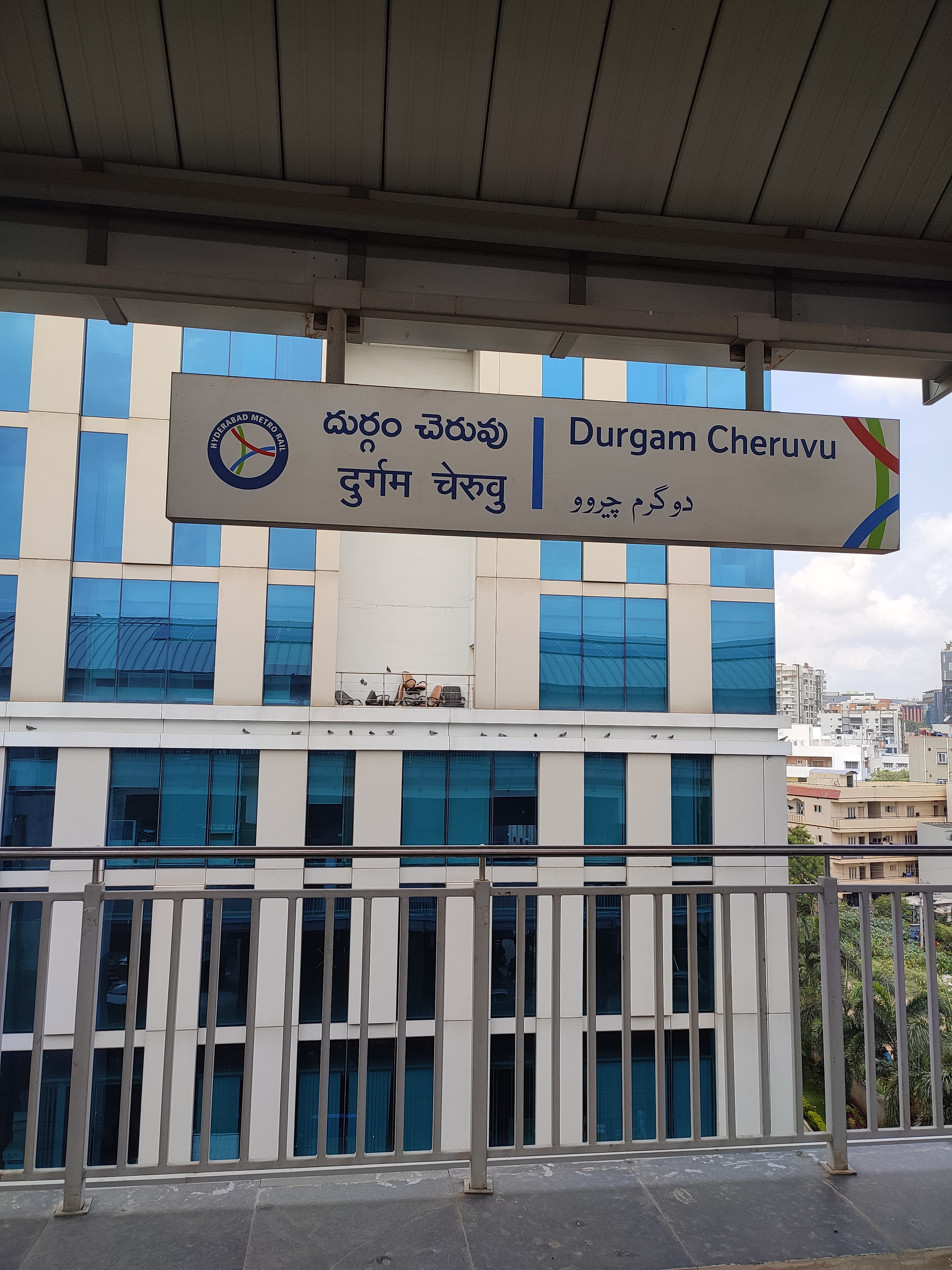

General information
- Location: Hitech City Rd, Sri Sai Nagar, Madhapur, Hyderabad, Telangana - 500081
- Coordinates: 17°26′34″N 78°23′15″E
- System: Hyderabad Metro station
- Owner: Larsen & Toubro (90%); Government of Telangana (10%)
- Operator: Hyderabad Metro Rail Ltd.
- Line: Blue Line
- Platforms: 2 (2 side platform)
- Tracks: 2

Construction
- Structure type: Elevated, Double track

History
- Opened: 20 March 2019; 7 years ago

Services
Preceding station	Hyderabad Metro	Following station
HITEC City towards Raidurg	Blue Line	Madhapur towards Nagole
Track layout
Location
- Location within Hyderabad Location within Telangana

Durgam Cheruvu Metro Station is located on the Blue Line of the Hyderabad Metro.

== History ==
It was opened on 20 March 2019.

== The station ==
=== Structure ===
Durgam Cheruvu elevated metro station situated on the Blue Line of Hyderabad Metro.

=== Facilities ===
The stations have long staircases, elevators and escalators from the street level to the platform level which provide easy and comfortable access. Also, operation panels inside the elevators are installed at a level that can be conveniently operated by all passengers, including disabled and elderly citizens.

=== Station layout ===
Street Level
This is the first level where passengers may park their vehicles and view the local area map.

Concourse level
Ticketing office or Ticket Vending Machines (TVMs) is located here. Retail outlets and other facilities like washrooms, ATMs, first aid, etc., will be available in this area.

Platform level
This layer consists of two platforms. Trains takes passengers from this level.

L1; Platforms	Side platform, doors will open on the left
L1; Platforms	Platform 2	Blue Line toward Nagole (Madhapur) →
L1; Platforms	Platform 1	← Blue Line toward Raidurg (HITEC City)
L1; Platforms	Side platform, doors will open on the left
M	Mezzanine	Fare control, station agent, Metro Card vending machines, crossover
G	Street level	Exit/Entrance

== Entrances and exits ==
Mezzanine (M)

- B -
- C - Qatar Visa Centre
- D -

== See also ==
- Hyderabad
- Transport in Hyderabad
- List of rapid transit systems
- List of metro systems
