= Kukatpally metro station =

Metro station in Hyderabad, India

Kukatpally
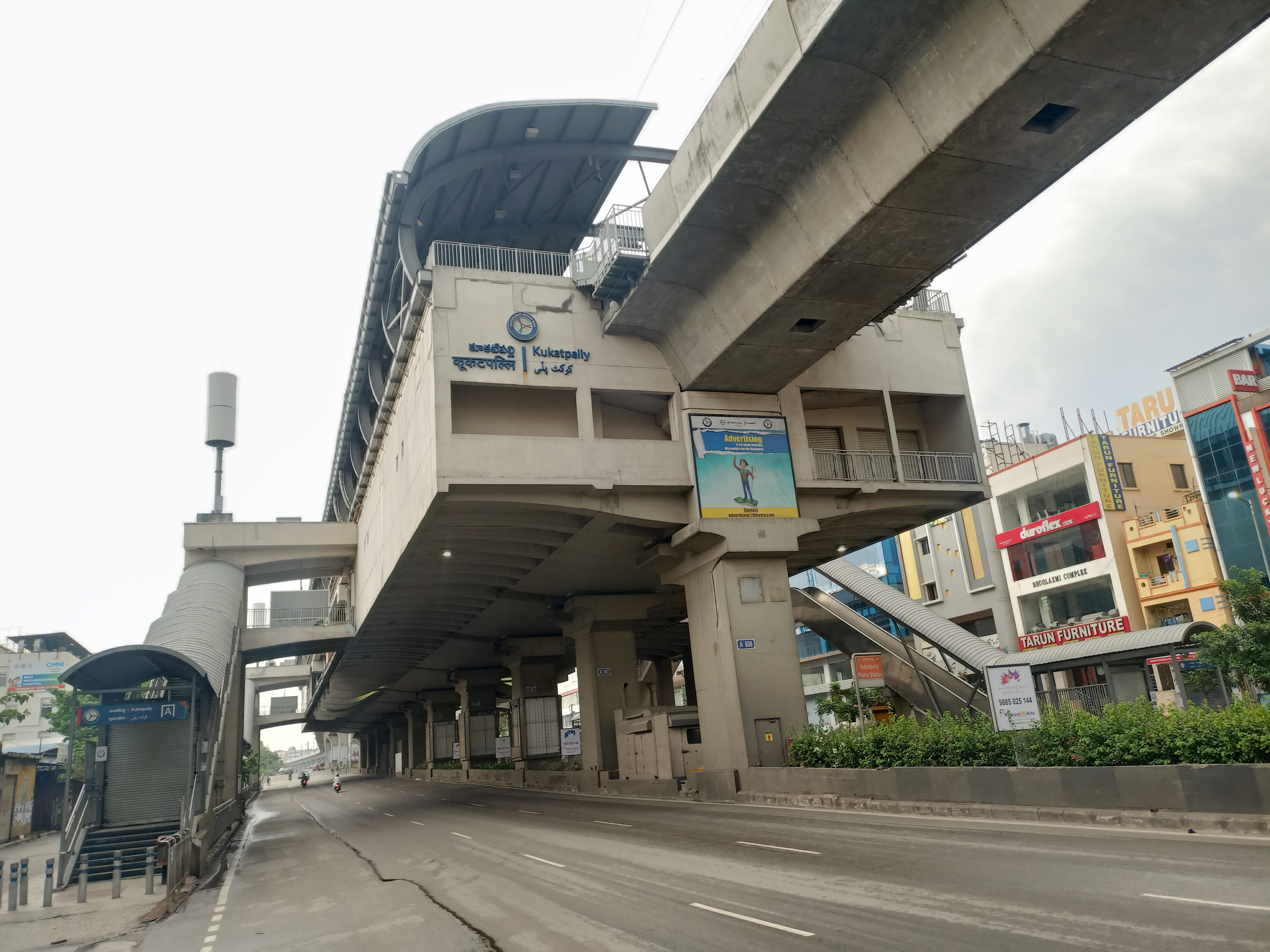

General information
- Location: Kukatpally, M J Colony, Balaji Nagar, Kukatpally, Hyderabad, Telangana 500072
- Coordinates: 17.4851155°N 78.409369°E
- System: Hyderabad Metro station
- Line: Red Line
- Platforms: Side platform Platform-1 → LB Nagar; Platform-2 → Miyapur
- Tracks: 2

Construction
- Structure type: Elevated, Double-track
- Platform levels: 2
- Parking: Available
- Cycle facilities: Available
- Accessible: Disabled access

Other information
- Status: Staffed, Operational

History
- Opened: 29 November 2017; 8 years ago
- Electrified: 25 kV 50 Hz AC through overhead catenary

Services
Preceding station	Hyderabad Metro	Following station
KPHB Colony towards Miyapur	Red Line	Dr. B. R. Ambedkar Balanagar towards LB Nagar
Route map
Location
- Location within Hyderabad Location within Telangana Location within India

The Kukatpally Metro Station is located on the Red Line of the Hyderabad Metro in India. This station was opened to public on 2017. It is near to Reliance Smart Bazaar, BJP Office, Omni Hospital, Sri Chaitanya Junior College, TSRTC Bus Stop, Reliance Digital and Indian Post Office.

== History ==
It was opened on 29 November 2017.

== The station ==
=== Structure ===
Kukatpally elevated metro station situated on the Red Line of Hyderabad Metro.

=== Facilities ===
The stations have staircases, elevators and escalators from the street level to the platform level which provide easy and comfortable access. Also, operation panels inside the elevators are installed at a level that can be conveniently operated by all passengers, including disabled and elderly citizens.

=== Station layout ===
Street Level
This is the first level where passengers may park their vehicles and view the local area map.

Concourse level
Ticketing office or Ticket Vending Machines (TVMs) is located here. Retail outlets and other facilities like washrooms, ATMs, first aid, etc., will be available in this area.

Platform level
This layer consists of two platforms. Trains takes passengers from this level.

G	Street level	Exit/Entrance
L1	Mezzanine	Fare control, station agent, Metro Card vending machines, crossover
L2	Side platform | Doors will open on the left
L2	Platform 1 Southbound	Towards → Vasavi LB Nagar next station is Dr. B.R. Ambedkar Balanagar
L2	Platform 2 Northbound	Towards ← Miyapur next station is KPHB Colony
L2	Side platform | Doors will open on the left
L2

== See also ==
- Hyderabad
- Transport in Hyderabad
- List of rapid transit systems
- List of metro systems
