= HITEC City metro station =

Metro station in Hyderabad, India

SBI HITEC City
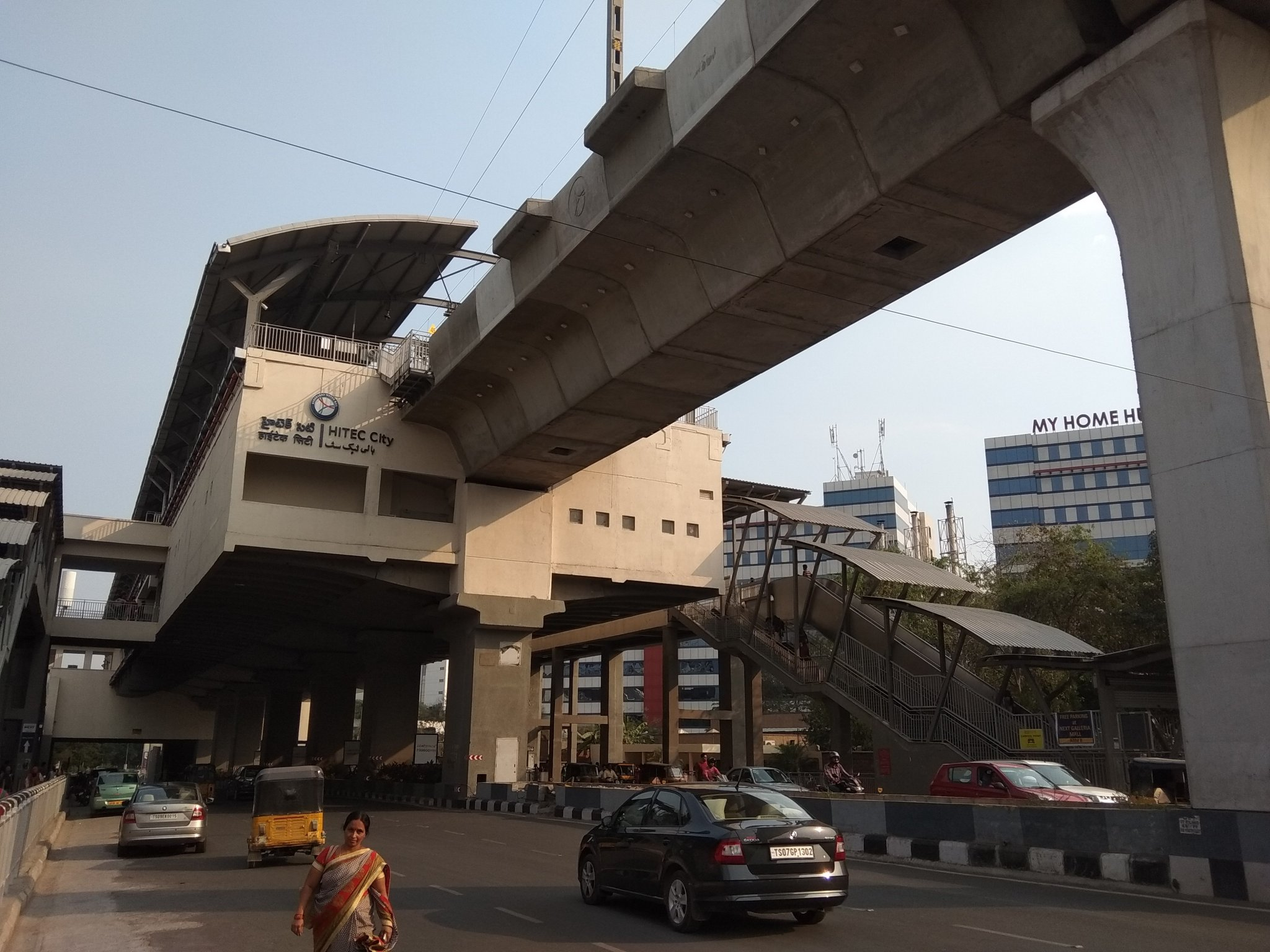
- HITEC City metro station

General information
- Location: 7/A/2, HITEC City Rd, Jaihind Enclave, Near Cyber Towers, HITEC City, Hyderabad, Telangana - 500081
- Coordinates: 17°26′56″N 78°22′59″E
- System: Hyderabad Metro station
- Owner: Larsen & Toubro (90%); Government of Telangana (10%)
- Operator: Hyderabad Metro Rail Ltd.
- Line: Blue Line
- Platforms: 2 (2 side platform)
- Tracks: 2

Construction
- Structure type: Elevated, Double track
- Parking: Available
- Accessible: Yes

History
- Opened: March 20, 2019; 7 years ago

Services
Preceding station	Hyderabad Metro	Following station
Raidurg Terminus	Blue Line	Durgam Cheruvu towards Nagole
Track layout
Location
- Location within Hyderabad

HITEC City Metro Station is located on the Blue Line of the Hyderabad Metro. Hitec City has three-level stations, having an estimated height of up to 60 feet or 18 metres. Hitec City metro station is near National Institute of Fashion Technology Hyderabad and Hyderabad Next Galleria mall (PVR icon multiplex). Hyderabad Next Galleria is developed by L&T Metro Rail Hyderabad Limited, and is spread over two acres and with a built up area of about 200,000 square feet (19,000 m^{2}). A dedicated skywalk connects the metro station to the Next Galleria mall. In September 2019, Medicover Hospitals (Formerly MaxCure Hospitals) became the sponsor of the HITEC City metro station, under semi-naming policy of Hyderabad metro to generate non-fare revenues. In May 2022, an exclusive electronic and technology mall, ‘e-Galleria’, was started in HITEC City metro station.

HITEC City metro station is the most busiest metro station in Hyderabad, with daily footfalls of around 42,000 commuters. This Corridor Three (Blue) from Nagole has few pillars inside Cyber Towers compound, thereafter the route turn towards Cyber Gateway, and finally cumlimating at the terminal point in Raheja Mindspace Junction (Raidurg metro station), from where Phase 2 airport route will commence. A reverse viaduct is between HiTec City and Trident Hotel. There are shuttle services from Hi-tech metro station to nearby IT companies like Microsoft, Value Labs and Raheja Mindspace to improve the last mile connectivity. In January 2023, the Visa Application Center (VAC) used for biometrics appointments, IW submissions & passport collection moved to Lower Concourse, HITEC City metro station, while actual visa interviews will continue at the US Consulate in Hyderabad.

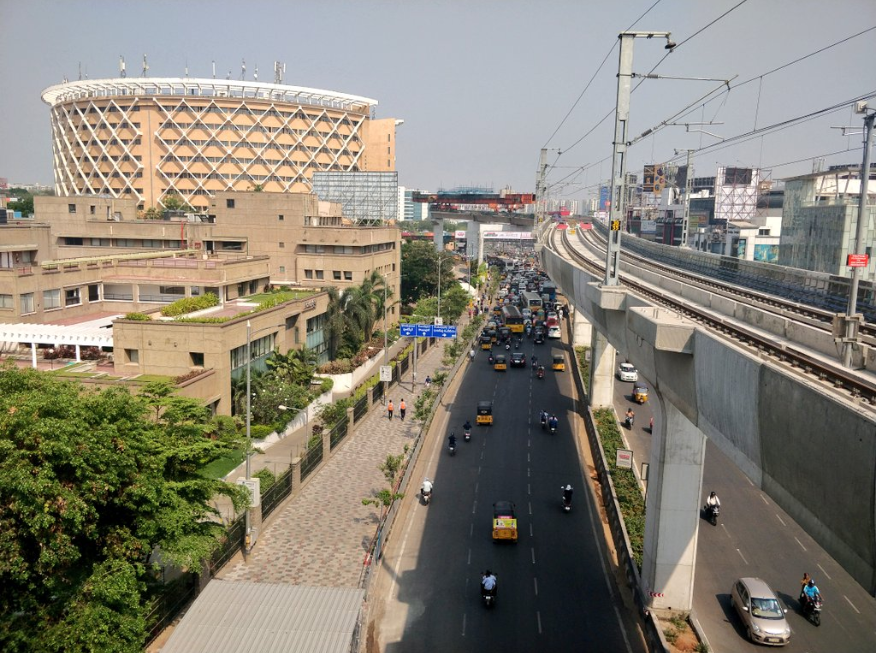
Hyderabad metro towards HITEC city Cyber Towers
