= Transport in Hyderabad =

Transport network serving Hyderabad and surrounding regions

Overview
- Locale: Hyderabad and surrounding regions
- Transit type: Rapid transit, commuter rail, buses, private automobile, pedestrian

Transport in Hyderabad is the network of roads, railways, rapid transit system in the capital and the largest city of Telangana. The city of Hyderabad also serves as the central hub of transport and logistics within the state.

Rathifile Bus Station and Secunderabad Junction

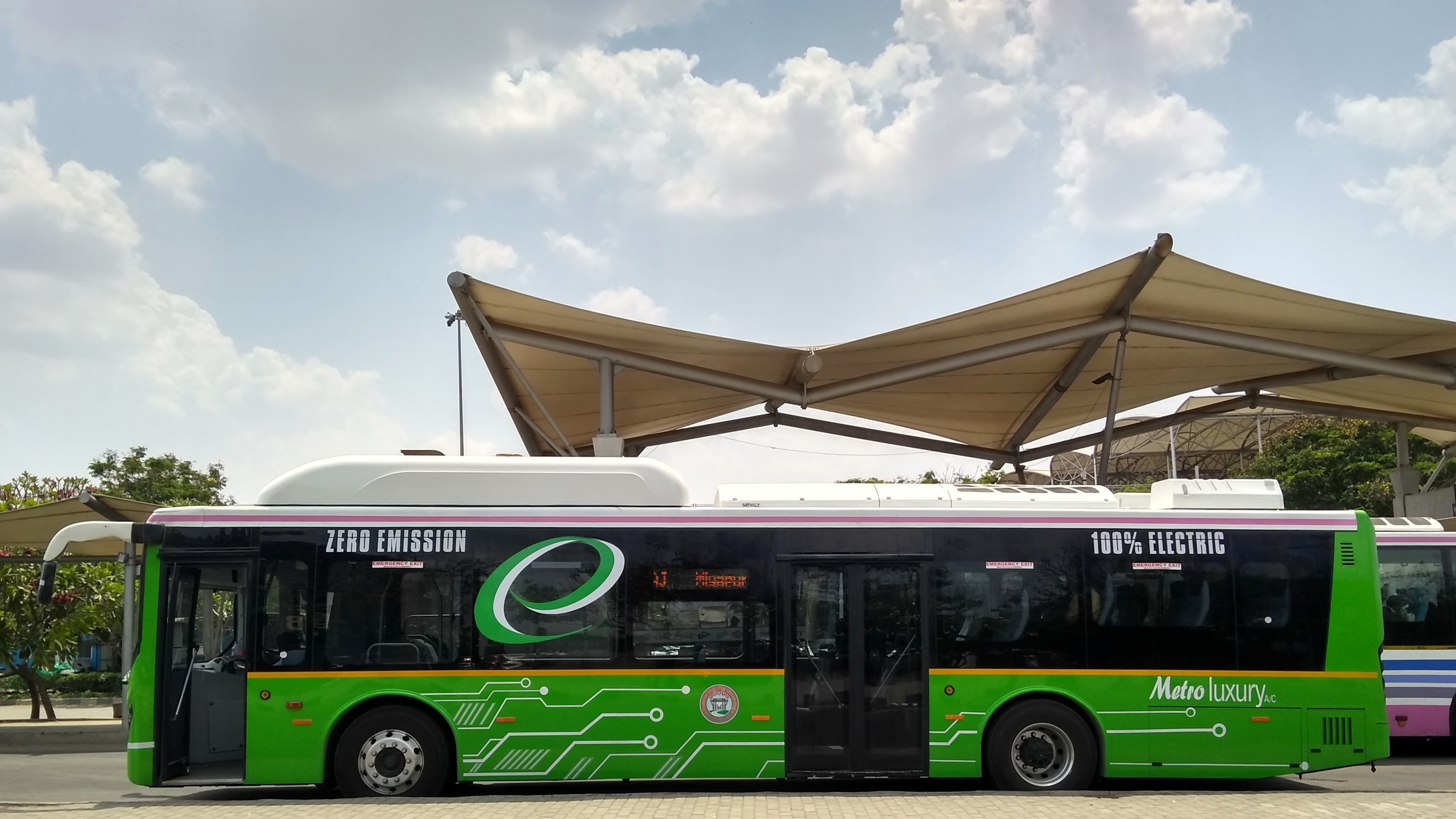
Olectra - BYD Electric Bus at Domestic Departures terminal in Hyderabad

== Road ==
Hyderabad is integrated into the National Highway Network of India through NH 44, NH 65, NH 163, NH 765, NH 765D, while four State Highways SH1, SH4, SH 6, SH 19 originate/terminate in Hyderabad. Hyderabad has a vehicle population of nearly 48 lakhs and is the highest after Delhi, Bengaluru, Chennai and Mumbai.

The first Expressway in Hyderabad connecting Mehdipatnam and Aramgarh opened for public in 2009 to ease connectivity to Rajiv Gandhi International Airport located in Shamshabad, and named after the former Prime Minister P V Narsimha Rao. An extension of this Expressway further to Shamshabad was mulled in 2018.

The Road Network in Hyderabad is characterised by a concentric network of Inner Ring Road and Outer Ring Road. The latter is an expressway stretching 158 km, built to provide orbital linkage between arterial radial roads within the city, as well as to offer connectivity the National Highways.

=== Bus ===
==== Telangana State Road Transport Corporation ====
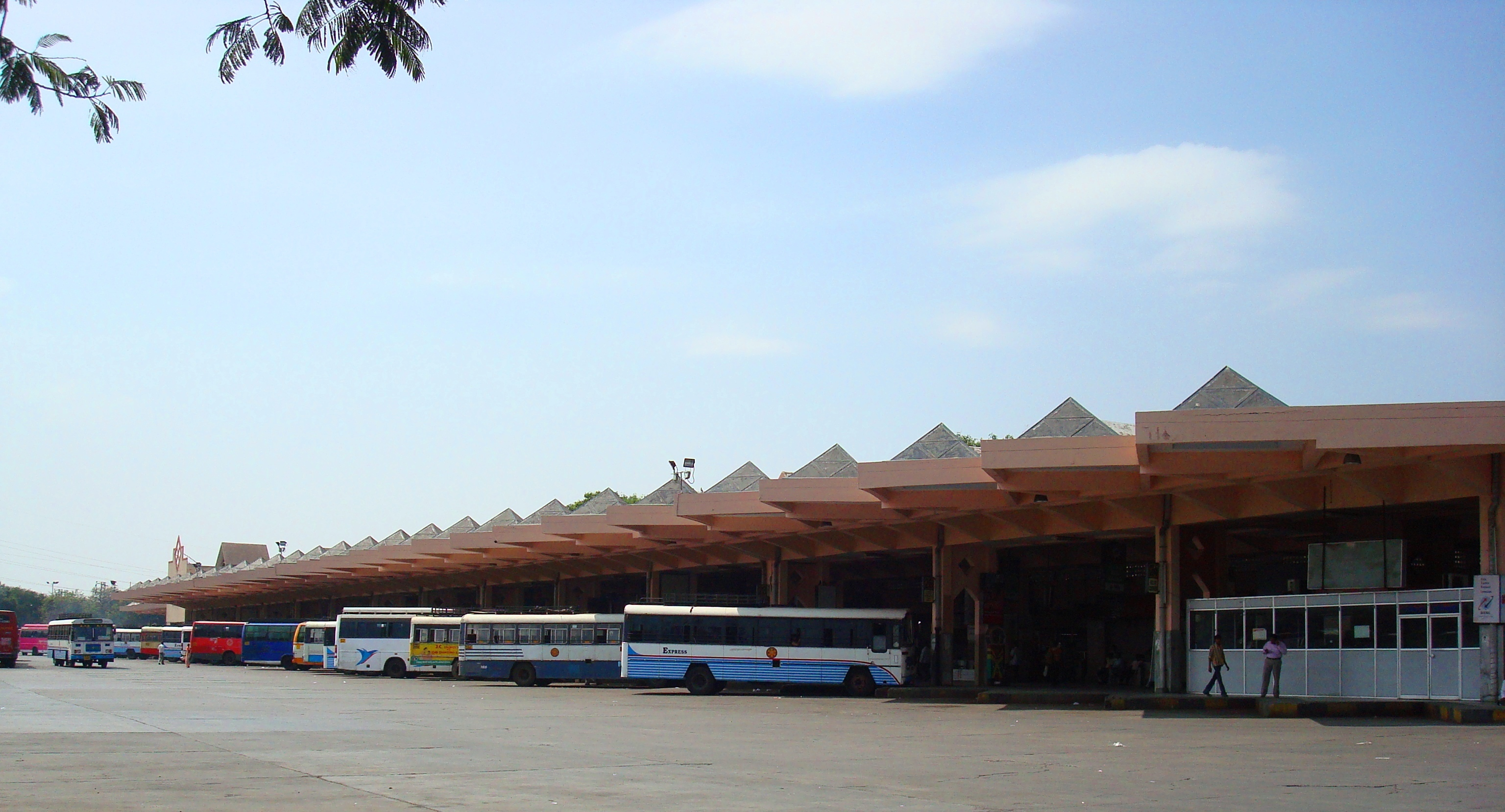
Mahatma Gandhi Bus Station

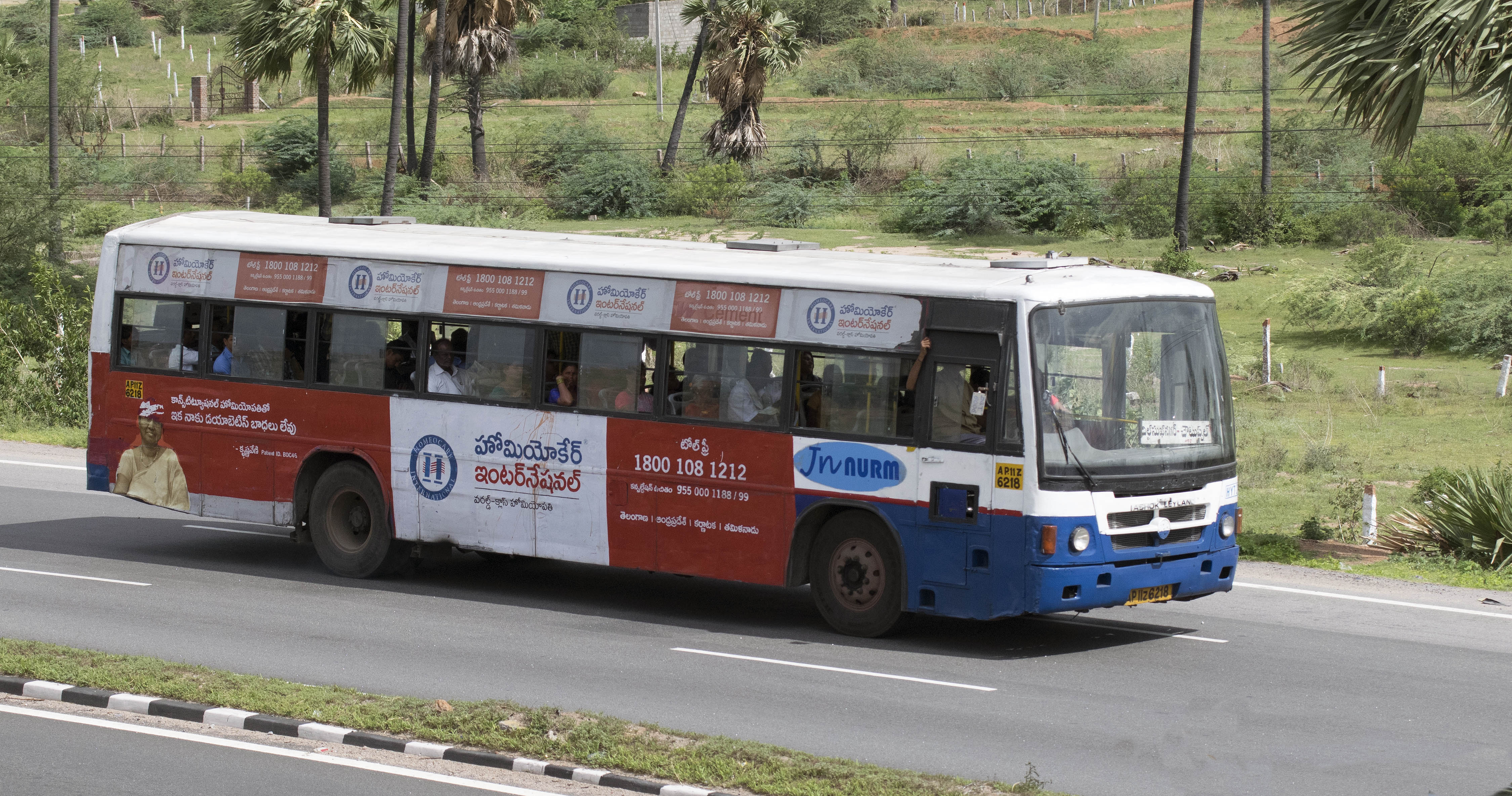
A local bus in Hyderabad

Hyderabad has an extensive intracity, intercity/regional and interstate bus service network operated by TGSRTC, backed by the Government of Telangana. Within the municipal limits of the city, TGSRTC plies intercity and interstate buses from Mahatma Gandhi Bus Station, Uppal Bus Station, Charminar Bus Station, Dilsukhnagar Bus Station, Koti Bus Station, Rathifile Bus Station, Ghatkesar Bus Station, Afzalgunj Bus Station, Medchal Bus Station, Sanathnagar Bus Station, ECIL Bus Station and Secretariat.

City buses are deployed from their respective depots which shall have jurisdiction over the staffing and frequency of services. City and Suburban buses constitute the primary mode of transport in Hyderabad.

TGSRTC has several kinds of services which differ in comfort, price and the number of stops:

- Metro Luxury (air-conditioned, discontinued)
- City Sheetal (air-conditioned, discontinued)
- E Metro AC (Electric, Air-conditioned)
- Metro Deluxe
- Metro Express Low Floor (non air-conditioned)
- Metro Express
- E Metro Express (Electric)
- City Ordinary
- E City Ordinary (Electric)
- Pushpak (for Airport Connectivity, air-conditioned). electric buses are used in this airport bus service.

==== Setwin ====
The State Government of Telangana (erstwhile Andhra Pradesh) sanctioned minibuses as a self-employment generation scheme which ply between different parts of the city in addition to the city buses run by TGSRTC.

=== Taxis ===
Metered Auto Rickshaw usually referred to as an "auto", is another widely available taxi in Hyderabad. Shared 'auto' taxis are also a commonplace in Hyderabad. Mandatory Metering is contentious issue between passengers, service providers and the authorities.

Vehicle for hire companies in Hyderabad include Uber, Ola Cabs, and taxicabs.

== Rail ==
South Central Railway, a zone of Indian Railways, is headquartered in Secunderabad. Apart from services provided with inter-city connectivity, this zone provides suburban transport services in Hyderabad & Secunderabad through MMTS.

=== Multi-Modal Transport System ===
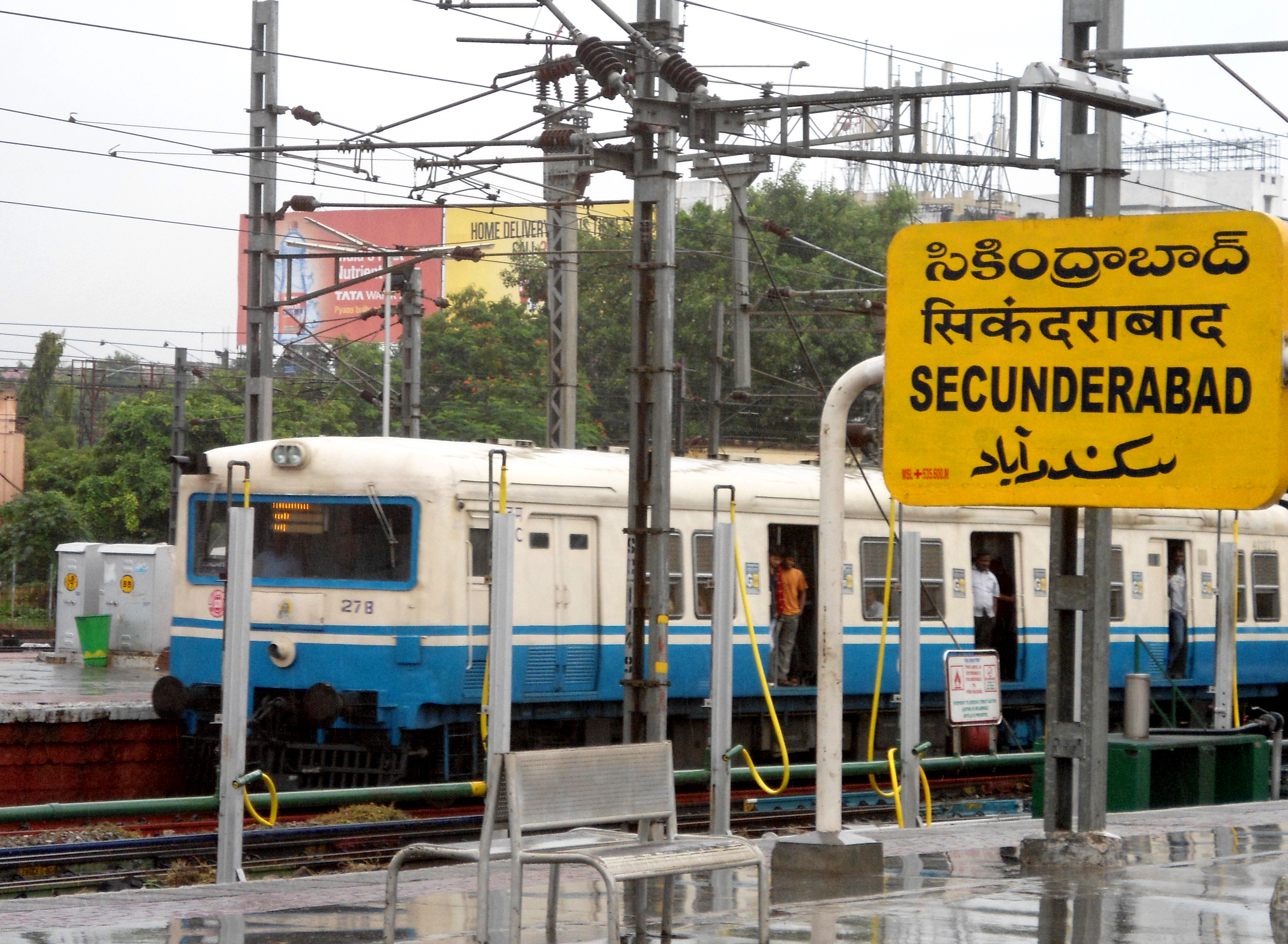
MMTS Local at Secunderabad Railway Station

Hyderabad has a commuter transportation system known as the Multi Modal Transport System (MMTS), connecting various suburbs of Hyderabad.

However, MMTS Services, despite the load factors, have been criticised for lack of adequate frequency and inordinate delays. Extension to the current project has been sought through the launch of Phase-II, albeit with limited success of approval.

=== Metro ===
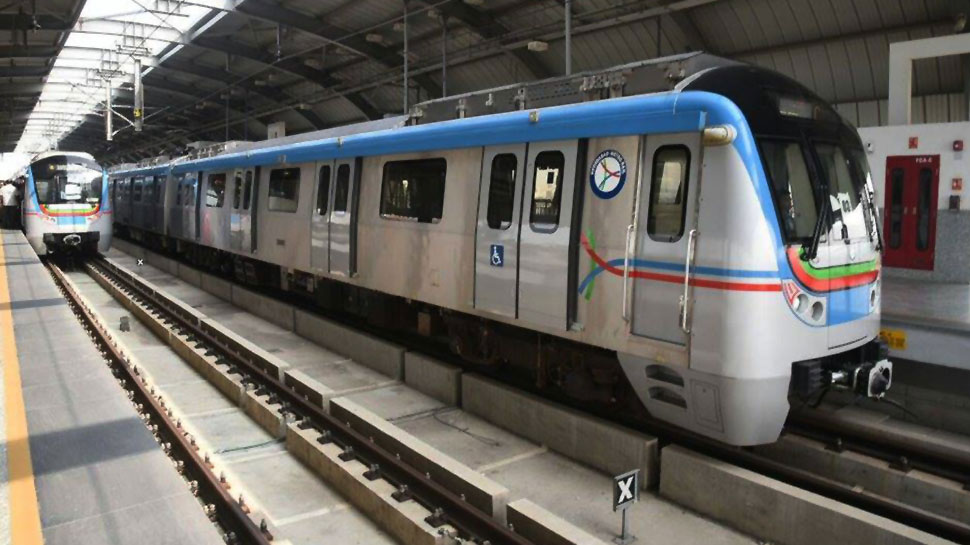
Hyderabad Metro has emerged as popular mode of public transport

Hyderabad Metro Rail, the Elevated Mass Rapid Transit System of Hyderabad, started operations in 2017.Currently Hyderabad Metro carries more than 3 lakh people per day. The initial phase of operation was 30 km long, connecting Nagole and Miyapur, over two corridors through Ameerpet Interchange Station.

The placement of Metro Stations across the city have been geared to feed the existing transport systems. It was however, criticised for inability to achieve its objectives, low frequency and high fares. The frequency of the services increased further since launch to address the shortage of frequency.

To further connectivity, HMRL tied up with Uber, to set up booking kiosks across stations. Further, bicycle facility was launched on a limited scale.

== Air ==
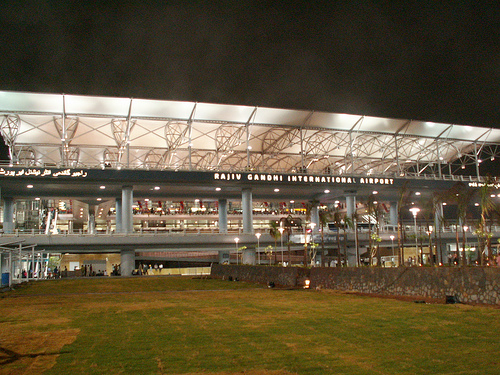
Rajiv Gandhi International Airport

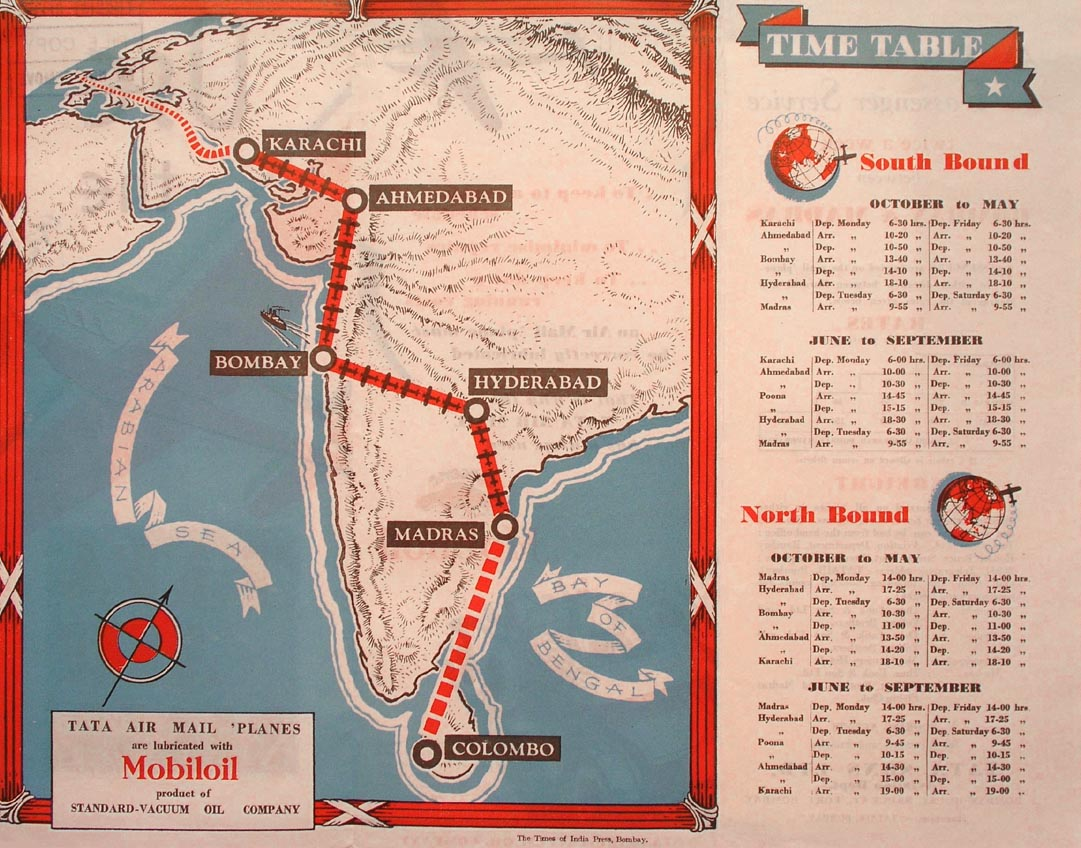
Tata Airlines, In 1935 started as an air mail service from Karachi to Madras via Hyderabad Deccan

In 1935, Hyderabad's Hakimpet air base was linked with international flight services. The new and modern airport at Shamshabad replaced old Begumpet Airport, on 23 March 2008. As of 2010, The Rajiv Gandhi International Airport at Shamshabad has been judged among the world's top airports in the category of serving 5–15 million passengers, according to Airports Council International, and the world's fifth best airport, according to Skytrax. The airport has one of the longest runway (4260 metres) in India, and caters to high passenger and cargo volumes. In January 2011, it became India's first airport to transport more than 30,000 tonnes (66,000,000 lb) of temperature-controlled pharmaceutical products. It is the primary base for SpiceJet's fleet of Bombardier Dash 8s. GMR Hyderabad International Airport Limited, which operates the airport, has been awarded the Center for Asia Pacific Aviation award in the category of Best Airport Environmental Performance of the Year 2009.

The airport is connected to the city by three major roads. The 11.6-kilometre (7.2 mi) Hyderabad Elevated Expressway provides dedicated high-speed travel to the airport. As of 2011, it is the longest expressway in India. The Nehru Outer Ring Road serves as a controlled-access expressway between Gachibowli and Shamshabad. Metered taxis and buses are available as transports to the airport.

Hyderabad is connected with direct flights to all major destinations in India, as well as to various locations in Middle East, Southeast Asia, Europe and North America. Currently, Hyderabad has flights connecting either directly or intermediate stops to foreign cities like Frankfurt, Singapore, Dubai, Bangkok, Kuala Lumpur, Dammam, Chicago (O'Hare), London (Heathrow), Doha, Jeddah, Muscat, Riyadh and Kuwait.
